= Sacondaga Raid =

Revolutionary War attack in Fulton County, NY

- Part of American Revolutionary War
- An Excerpt from Claude J. Sauthier's 1779 Chorographical Map of New York. The Green dot represents Fish House, the location of the Shew residence; Blue represents the Mayfield mills; Yellow represents Philadelphia Bush; and Red represents Fonda's Bush (Broadalbin)
Date	June 2 - 3, 1778
Location	Fish House, Mayfield, Broadalbin, and Perth, New York

Belligerents
United States	Great Britain; Haudenosaunee

Commanders and leaders
Col. Frederick Visscher	Capt. John Ross

Units involved
Tryon County militia	King's Royal Regiment of New York, 34th Regiment of Foot, Mohawk Nation

Strength
Unknown	~200 Loyalists and Haudenosaunee

Casualties and losses
1 killed, 20 prisoners taken (4 released, 1 escaped). 6 prisoners later died in captivity	none

The Sacondaga Raid or Ross' Raid was an offensive led by British Regular Captain John Ross during the American Revolutionary War. Captain Ross' Regular forces, combined with Loyalist and Mohawk allies, attacked the settlements and homes of the Patriot soldiers living on the Sacondaga Patent. This tract of land was situated in eastern Tryon County, presently comprising parts of the towns of Northampton, Broadalbin, Mayfield, and Perth in Fulton County, New York.

Sacondaga, meaning drowned lands, is the original spelling attributed to the land patent, and much of this territory is presently submerged beneath the Great Sacandaga Lake.

== Background ==
After the failure of the British Campaign of 1777 with General Burgoyne's defeat at Saratoga, military tactics on New York's frontier shifted to guerilla-style warfare. British colonial leaders in Quebec, such as Governor Guy Carleton and Governor Frederick Haldimand provided support to Loyalist and Native American raiding parties that designed to burn Patriot farms, take prisoners, and force the settlers to flee the territory.

In June of 1776, Sir John Johnson arrived in Montreal with 170 of his tenants and organized the King's Royal Regiment of New York. By the spring of 1778, well over 200 Loyalists fled Tryon County to join this regiment. On May 30, 1778, forces led by Joseph Brant attacked Cobleskill, which mobilized the Tryon County Militia.

== Raid ==
On June 2, 1778 forces numbering about 200 under command of Capt. John Ross arrived in northeastern Tryon County from Quebec, via the Champlain Valley and Sacandaga River. Ross' forces split into smaller raiding parties and attacked several places simultaneously. The raiders reportedly had a list of specific targets to pursue.

The grist mill at Mayfield was burned, and its miller, Henry Kelly, was killed. His wife, Francyntje, survived and reported the incident to Major Jellis Fonda. Fonda's Bush, (presently the Village of Broadalbin) was attacked, the settlement was destroyed, and several prisoners were taken including John Putman, Joseph Scott, John Reese, Herman Salisbury, and Andrew Bowman. At Philadelphia Bush, six miles east of Johnstown, George Cough and his son, Henry, were taken prisoner, along with Charles Marinus, his son, John, and four others who were released. A few farms on the Sacandaga meadows were attacked, taking, Robert Martin and David Harris as prisoners.

On June 3, Solomon Woodworth was taken prisoner with Godfrey Shew and three of his sons after helping defend the house overnight. The Shew farm was then plundered and burned. The raiding party then embarked downstream on the Sacandaga River, making their night camp near the present site of the Conklingville Dam. Woodworth escaped after faking an illness, and the party continued to Canada the next morning.

In the wake of the attack at Cobleskill, most of the militia was dispatched to different parts of Tryon County. Fearing an attack at Caughnawaga, the settlers brought their families to seek refuge in the Caughnawaga Church, having only seven soldiers to defend the fort.

Of the prisoners or casualties, Kelly, Woodworth, Scott, and the four Shews were serving in the Militia.

== Aftermath ==
Numerous homes and farms were burned during the raid, fathers and elder brothers were carried off as prisoners, leaving the wives and younger children to seek refuge. From the Sacandaga River, the nearest haven was Fort Johnstown, 18 miles away. The displaced settlers made this trek, but in great fear of the enemy and at great physical expense. This raid was a major factor that led Major Jellis Fonda to advocate for the construction of a fort at Sacondaga for the protection of the frontier settlements.

Of the 15 prisoners taken to Canada, John Shew, Joseph Scott, Andrew Bowman, George Cough and his son, Henry, were retained and adopted by their native captors, and essentially became their slaves. Godfrey Shew, his sons, Jacob and Stephen, John Putman, Herman Salisbury, John Reese, Robert Martin, David Harris, Charles Marinus, and his son, John, were sold to the British officers as prisoners of war. The prisoners sold to the British were held captive aboard the HMS Maria, where father and son Marinus, Putman, and Salisbury died. The survivors were released at Boston, and Reese was believed to have died on the way home. Henry Cough also died in captivity. George Cough, Bowman, Scott, and John Shew escaped while hunting for their captors and returned home by the fall of 1778. Jacob Shew was the last of the prisoners to return home, having suffered smallpox, and arrived at Johnstown on St. Patrick's Day of 1779.

The settlements at Fonda's Bush and Fish House were abandoned until after the war. The grist mill in Mayfield provided the settlers with a nearby place to mill their grains. With its destruction, settlers had to travel all the way to Johnstown for that purpose. The exposed families took up a new residence at the fort in Johnstown.
