= Philadelphia Bush =

Philadelphia Bush was a colonial settlement in Tryon County, New York, and was host to significant events during the Frontier War of the American Revolution.

== History ==
=== Settlement ===
After the French and Indian War, settlements expanded in the Mohawk River valley, most through the leadership of Sir William Johnson. Beginning in about 1763, settlers came to the area six miles east of Johnstown, and purchased leases on the Sacondaga and Kingsborough Patents. Most of these settlers were German immigrants from Philadelphia, hence the name, Philadelphia Bush.

By 1770 a school house was established, the second known to have been established in present-day Fulton County.

=== Revolutionary War ===
As tenants of the Johnson family, many residents of Philadelphia Bush went with Sir John Johnson when he fled Johnstown for safety in Canada in May 1776. During the war, the remaining settlers hosted Loyalist scouts who spied on the activities around Patriot-held Fort Johnstown. Several settlers were taken prisoner for their Loyalist affiliations, some were driven from their farms and had their possessions confiscated or destroyed.

In June 1778, four prisoners were taken from Philadelphia Bush during the Sacondaga Raid. Three of them died in captivity.

In October 1781, a party Loyalist scouts attacked Fort Johnstown, resulting in one prisoner being taken, and forced a few loyalist families to escape to Canada.

In February 1782, at least two Loyalist families were driven out of the settlement by a force of Militia reportedly under orders of Col. Marinus Willett.

In May 1782, the settlement was raided by Mohawk warriors, taking four prisoners to Canada, including George Cough, which became his second time in captivity. During the raid, the school house was burned. Upon prisoner exchanged, they returned by the end of the year.

=== Early American Period ===
Philadelphia Bush was located in the Town of Caughnawaga, which was established in 1788. After its division in 1793, the settlement was split between the towns of Mayfield, Amsterdam (presently Perth), and Johnstown. The old settlement grew into two hamlets, once known as "South Mayfield" and "West Perth." The area is presently rural and actively engaged in agricultural production. NY-29 follows some of the original path through this settlement, along with Black Street (Co. Hwy 106), and Sacandaga Road.
