= Sacondaga Blockhouse =

Coordinates: 43.0889°N 74.2392°W

The Sacondaga Blockhouse or Fort Fisher/Visscher was a frontier fortification constructed during the American Revolutionary War, and in use from the spring of 1779 to the summer of 1780. It was located in Mayfield, then in Tryon County, New York.

== Background ==
During the French and Indian War, the Sacandaga River posed a threat to the Mohawk Valley settlements, as it provided a water route for their enemy combatants from their bases in Canada. Sir William Johnson successfully petitioned and built a fort called Castle Cumberland in 1760. At the end of the war, this post was abandoned and Johnson later built his summer home on the same site (the confluence of the Mayfield and Kennyetto Creeks.)

In the Revolutionary War, the Mohawk Valley suffered the same vulnerability as the generation before. The Loyalists and their Haudenosaunee allies often came to attack Tryon County via the Sacandaga River, (e.g. the Sacondaga Raid in June of 1778.) Two attacks in April of 1779 and consistent pleas from Major Jellis Fonda prompted General James Clinton to espouse the situation. In the summer of 1776, Sir William Johnson's summer home on the Sacondaga Vlaie was briefly fortified, but abandoned for more active posts in the region.

== Construction and activity ==
General Clinton gave the orders to build a blockhouse at Sacondaga, which were executed by Col. Peter Gansevoort and Col. Frederick Visscher's 3rd Regiment of Tryon County Militia on April 26, 1779. Col. Gansevoort's Regiment aided in the construction, which was reportedly completed after two weeks. It was officially named the Sacondaga Blockhouse, but also called Fort Visscher/Fisher, by the Colonel's men.

The fort was regularly garrisoned by a detachment from the regiment of Col. Lewis Duboys, and drafts from Col. Visscher's regiment. The forces were engaged in scouting throughout 1779, and were reported to have burned the home of a Loyalist, Harmanus Vlaak, in November of 1779. Enlistments expired at the end of the year and the remaining forces withdrew to Fort Johnstown. The fort was then occupied by Solomon Woodworth and his family, a settler at Mayfield and Sergeant in Captain Little's Company of Col Visscher's 3rd Regiment.

== Attack on the Sacondaga Blockhouse ==
With reports of enemy movements in March of 1780, Captain Emanuel DeGraff brought his company to garrison the blockhouse. After scouting parties revealed no activity, the garrison withdrew to Fort Johnstown on March 27th, bringing Mrs. Phebe Woodworth with them, leaving her husband alone in the blockhouse. The following night, Tuesday, March 28, 1780, seven Mohawk warriors, led by John Brant, came through the settlement and after gathering intelligence, decided to burn what they believed to be an empty blockhouse. After the blockhouse was set on fire, Sgt. Solomon Woodworth emerged and knocked the burning boards off, receiving wounds in the process. He returned fire, gravely wounding one of the warriors, who was carried off by his allies.

The following morning, Woodworth assembled a scouting party and pursued the raiding party on snowshoes. After over 50 miles of pursuit, Woodworth's party caught up with Brant's party, five of whom were at camp. Brant and another were off hunting. Woodworth and his men killed the five warriors, plundered their possessions and returned to Johnstown. Upon arriving in Canada, Brant reported the event to Col. Daniel Claus.

== Burning of the Valleys ==
After the attack, the fort was garrisoned by 60 men under command of Lt. Col. Volkert Veeder. No mention of the blockhouse is made in Col Sir John Johnson's raid on the Caughnawaga District in May of 1780. The garrisons which normally held the post were sent to more dire location during the burning of the Mohawk and Schoharie valleys in October of 1780. No further mention can be found of the fort. Solomon Woodworth was later killed at the Battle of West Canada Creek in September of 1781.

== Location ==
There has been much debate on the location of the Fort. Local historians proposed that its location may lie beneath the Sacandaga Reservoir. General James Clinton ordered the fort to be built along the main trail to "Sir William [Johnson's] Pleasure House, 10 miles from Johnstown, near the road leading to Mayfield." This would be the present location of the intersection of Vandenburgh Point Road and Proper Road in the Town of Mayfield.
