= Knox Mansion =

Historic house in New York, United States

- U.S. National Register of Historic Places
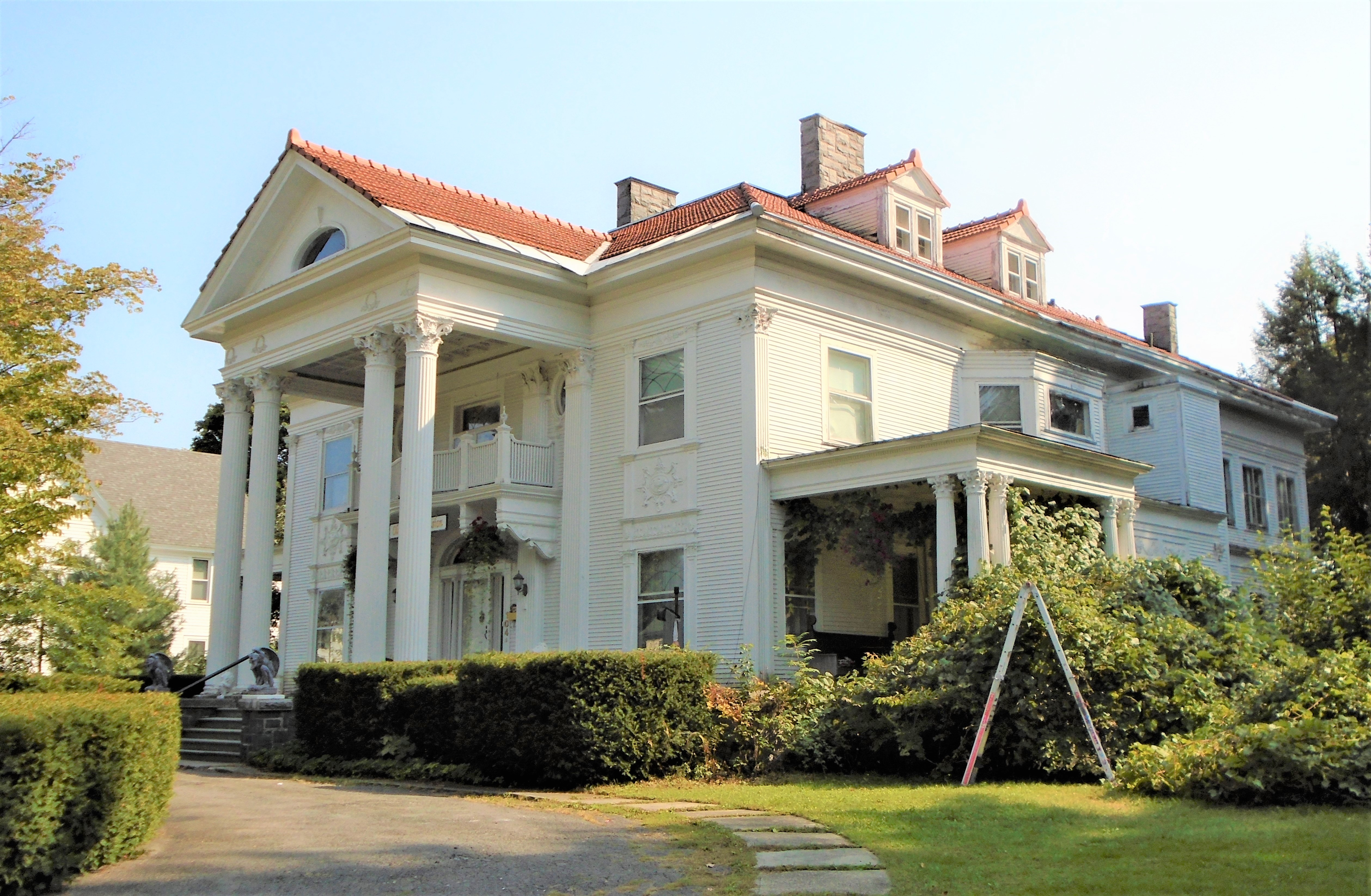
- (2020)

- Location within New York Location within the United States
- Location: 104 W. 2nd Avebue; Johnstown, New York
- Coordinates: 43°0′2″N 74°22′28″W
- Built: 1898; 1908
- Architect: Peabody & Beauley (1898); Linn Kinne (1908)
- Architectural style: Classical Revival
- NRHP reference No.: 08000101
- Added to NRHP: February 28, 2008

The Knox Mansion is a historical mansion at 104 West 2nd Avenue in the city of Johnstown, Fulton County, New York.

== History ==
The house was built in 1898 by the gelatine magnate and businessman Charles Knox and his wife Rose Knox, who owned Knox Gelatine, which had a factory in Johnstown. The Classical Revival mansion, which was designed by Peabody & Beauley of Chicago, has 42 rooms, an elevator, a grand staircase, and a solid lava ash fireplace which was imported from a castle in Italy. The house cost $1.2 million to build in 1898. In 1908 an addition was built to a design by Utica architect Linn Kinne.

When Rose Knox died in 1950, the house was sold to her doctor, Dr. Larrabee. Eventually the house fell into disrepair, and much of its contents were sold by antiques dealers. It was bought in 1993 by Marty Quinn, who renovated it and then operated it as a museum/bed and breakfast/limousine agency/private residence. It has several secret places such as a windowless room just off the attic and a hidden panel behind a built-in shelf in the billiard room. The mansion has been said to be haunted.

=== National Register of Historic Places ===
It was listed on the National Register of Historic Places in 2008. The mansion has been given not-for-profit status and is operated as a museum.
