= Northville Central School District =

School district in New York, United States

Northville Central School District is a school district in New York State.

In Fulton County it includes sections of the towns of Bleecker, Mayfield, and Northampton. In Hamilton County it includes sections of the towns of Benson and Hope. The district extends into the Rown of Edinburg in Saratoga County.

In Fulton County it includes Northville Village. Its attendance boundary includes parts of Adirondack Park.

== History ==
In 2022 the enrollment count was below 450.

Leslie Ford was the superintendent until June 2022. Sarah Chauncey, previously the superintendent of Rockland BOCES, became the next superintendent of Northville Central.

== Operations ==
Chauncey stated that the superintendent of this district has additional roles.

== Schools ==
- Northville High School (middle and high school)
- Northville Elementary School
