= Elizabeth Van Valkenburgh =

American murderer (1799–1846)

Elizabeth van Valkenburgh
- Born: Elizabeth Woodley; July 1799; Bennington, Vermont, U.S.
- Died: January 24, 1846 (aged 46); Johnstown, New York, U.S.
- Spouse: John Van Valkenburgh
- Children: 6
- Status: Deceased
- Conviction: Murder
- Penalty: Death by hanging

Elizabeth Van Valkenburgh (née Woodley; July 1799 – January 24, 1846) was an early American murderer who was hanged for poisoning her husband.

== Background ==
Elizabeth Woodley was born in Bennington, Vermont. Her parents died when she was around 8 years old, and she was sent to Cambridge, New York to live; she had little education or religious upbringing.

== First marriage ==
She first married at the age of 20, moving with her husband, with whom she had four children, to Pennsylvania. After living there for six years, the family moved near to Johnstown, New York, where she remained for the next 18 years. In 1833, her first husband died, which she initially stated was due to dyspepsia and exposure. Later, she admitted that she had poisoned him by adding arsenic to his rum, because she was "provoked" by his drinking in bars. In an addendum to her confession to Van Valkenburgh's murder, she noted that her first husband had been able to go to work the following day after being poisoned, although he suffered after effects until he died, and that she did not intend to kill him.

== Second marriage and murder ==
She married John Van Valkenburgh, with whom she had two more children, in 1834. In her confession, she stated that he was an alcoholic, that he "misused the children", and that "we frequently quarrelled" when he was drunk. Her son had offered to buy "a place" for her and the other children in the west, but John Van Valkenburgh opposed this. She stated in her confession that "John was in a frolic for several weeks, during which time he never came home sober, nor provided anything for his family." She managed to purchase arsenic and poison his tea, although he recovered from the first dose of poison. Several weeks later, she mixed another dose in his brandy. So gruesome was his death, however, she said that "if the deed could have been recalled, I would have done it with all my heart."

She ran away, hid in a barn, and broke her leg in a fall from the haymow. She was captured, tried and convicted. She was sentenced to death by hanging. Many people, including ten of the jurors, petitioned Governor Silas Wright for clemency, but having studied the materials related to the crime, and despite being moved by her gender and poverty, he could find no new evidence to stop the execution. She was executed on January 24, 1846. Because of her broken leg and her obesity, Van Valkenburgh was hanged in an unusual way. She was carried to the gallows in her rocking chair and was rocking away when the trap was sprung.
