= Godfrey Shew House =

Historic house in New York, United States

- U.S. National Register of Historic Places
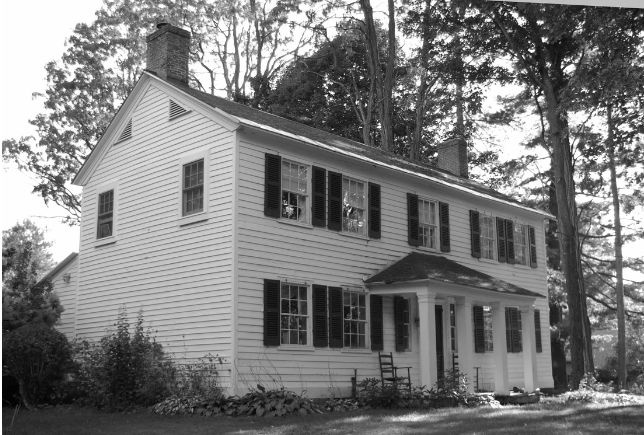
- Godfrey Shew House, Fish House Village, Fulton County, NY, circa 2009

- Location within New York Location within the United States
- Location: 1632 S. Shore Rd., Fish House, New York
- Coordinates: 43°8′43″N 74°7′26″W
- Area: 7.8 acres (3.2 ha)
- Built: 1784
- Architectural style: Federal
- NRHP reference No.: 06000574
- Added to NRHP: July 12, 2006

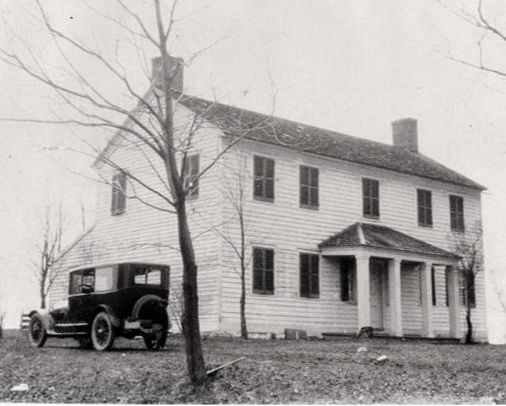
Godfrey Shew House, Fish House Village, Fulton County, NY, circa 1928

Godfrey Shew House is a historic home located at Fish House in Fulton County, New York. It was built in 1784 and is a 2-story, five-bay-wide and two-bay-deep, timber-frame, gable-roofed residence in the Federal style. Attached to the main block is a 1-story wing. It features a 1-story entrance porch supported by four Tuscan columns. Also on the property is a 2 1/2-story carriage house dating to about 1885.

It was listed on the National Register of Historic Places in 2006.

Godfrey Shew immigrated from Germany by way of Rotterdam and England, to Philadelphia in the British Colony of Pennsylvania arriving October 23, 1752 . "Godfrey Shew, the father of Jacob Shew, emigrated from Germany to this country, at the age of 19, and just before the French war." "But alas, ere he completed half of his journey, his pleasure was clouded with sorrow. The ship was struck by lightning which caused a leak and all on board were in agony, expecting soon to find a watery grave. No time was lost pumping out the water and devising a plan to stop the leak, which they succeeded in doing the third day by spiking a piece of sole leather over the leak, then placing heavy boxes immediately on to close the valve. The exertion of all was so great that the insides of their hands were, in some cases, worn through to the bone. Although it was not his intention to remain in America, when he left home, after such extreme suffering he resolved when he reached New York "never to cross the ocean again".

He served in the French and Indian war at Fort Ticonderoga in New York, returning to Pennsylvania and marrying "Katie" Frey May 10, 1757 in Northampton, Pennsylvania, where their 2 oldest sons were born. In 1762 or 1763 they removed to Johnstown, Tryon County, NY as tenant farmers for Sir William Johnson, British Indian agent for New York.

From their son Jacob Shew's Revolutionary War Pension application: "Some eight years previous to the commencement of the Revolutionary War, Godfrey Shew, (this applicant's father) with his family, removed from Johnstown to a place called Sacandaga at that time; which place is now called Fish-house in the Town of Northampton, on the west branch of the Hudson's river, about eighteen miles from Johnstown." About 1770 "They built the first house (log) in this village in the north end of the lot wh

ere the Methodist Church now stands." During the Revolution, on June 3, 1778 "about 100 of the enemy, Indians and Tories led by Lieut. (afterwards Major) Ross, who had come from Canada", burned their log home and captured Godfrey Shew and 3 of his sons, taking them to Canada for later prisoner exchange.

After the war, Godfrey and sons returned to Fish House and build the present exiting frame house in 1784, with various Shew family members living there until March 29 1842 when it was sold to David Page.

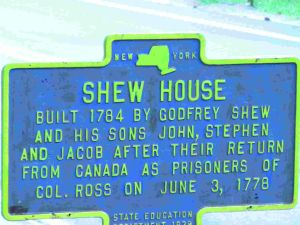
Godfrey Shew House, Fish House Village, Fulton County, NY
