= Sacandaga Railroad Station =

- U.S. National Register of Historic Places
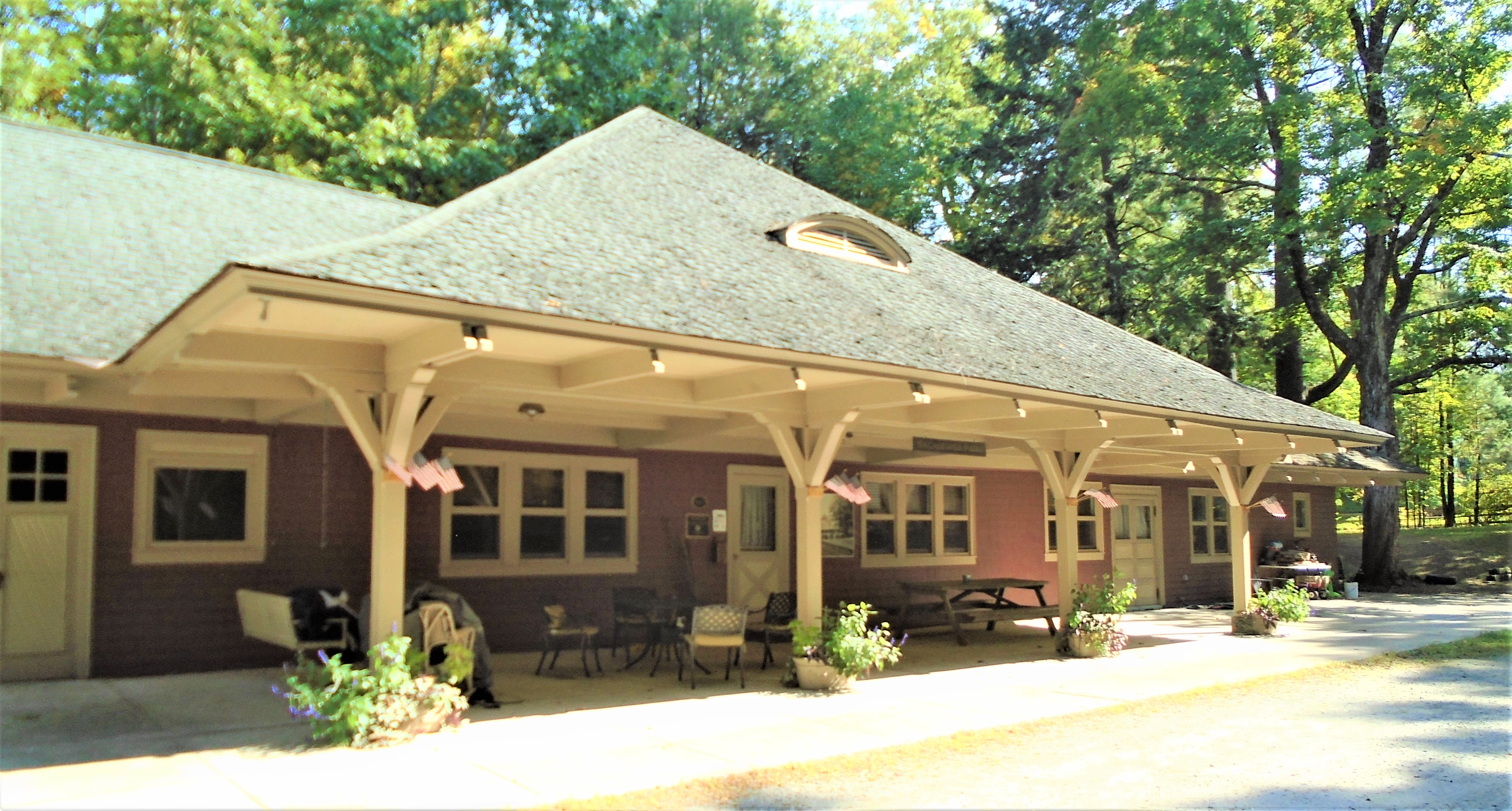
- (2020)

- Location within New York Location within the United States
- Location: 136 McKinley Avenue, Northville, New York
- Nearest city: Sacandaga Park, New York
- Coordinates: 43°13′1″N 74°11′9″W
- Area: 1 acre (0.40 ha)
- Built: 1920
- Architectural style: Shingle Style
- NRHP reference No.: 03000094
- Added to NRHP: March 7, 2003

The Sacandaga Railroad Station is a historic train station located at 136 McKinley Avenue in the town of Northampton in Fulton County, New York. It was built in 1920 to serve Sacandaga Park and is a one-story, rectangular hipped roof wood-frame building, 125 feet by 30 feet, on a concrete slab foundation. It features exposed rafter ends, small louvered dormers, and broad eaves in the Shingle Style. In the 1950s it was converted for use as a stable. It is a rare surviving, non-residential building remaining from the heyday of Sacandaga Park as a resort established and served by the Fonda, Johnstown, and Gloversville Railroad.

The station was listed on the National Register of Historic Places in 2003.

== See also ==
- National Register of Historic Places listings in Fulton County, New York
