= Old English District =

Old English District was one of the districts of Tryon County when it was set off from Albany County, in the American colony of New York, on March 12, 1772. The district continued under that name when the county name was changed to Montgomery County in April, 1784, after the American Revolution.

The Old English District covered roughly the area now covered by Otsego County, New York. The districts became obsolete when Montgomery County was divided into nine towns on March 7, 1788.
