= Fulton County Courthouse (New York) =

- U.S. National Register of Historic Places
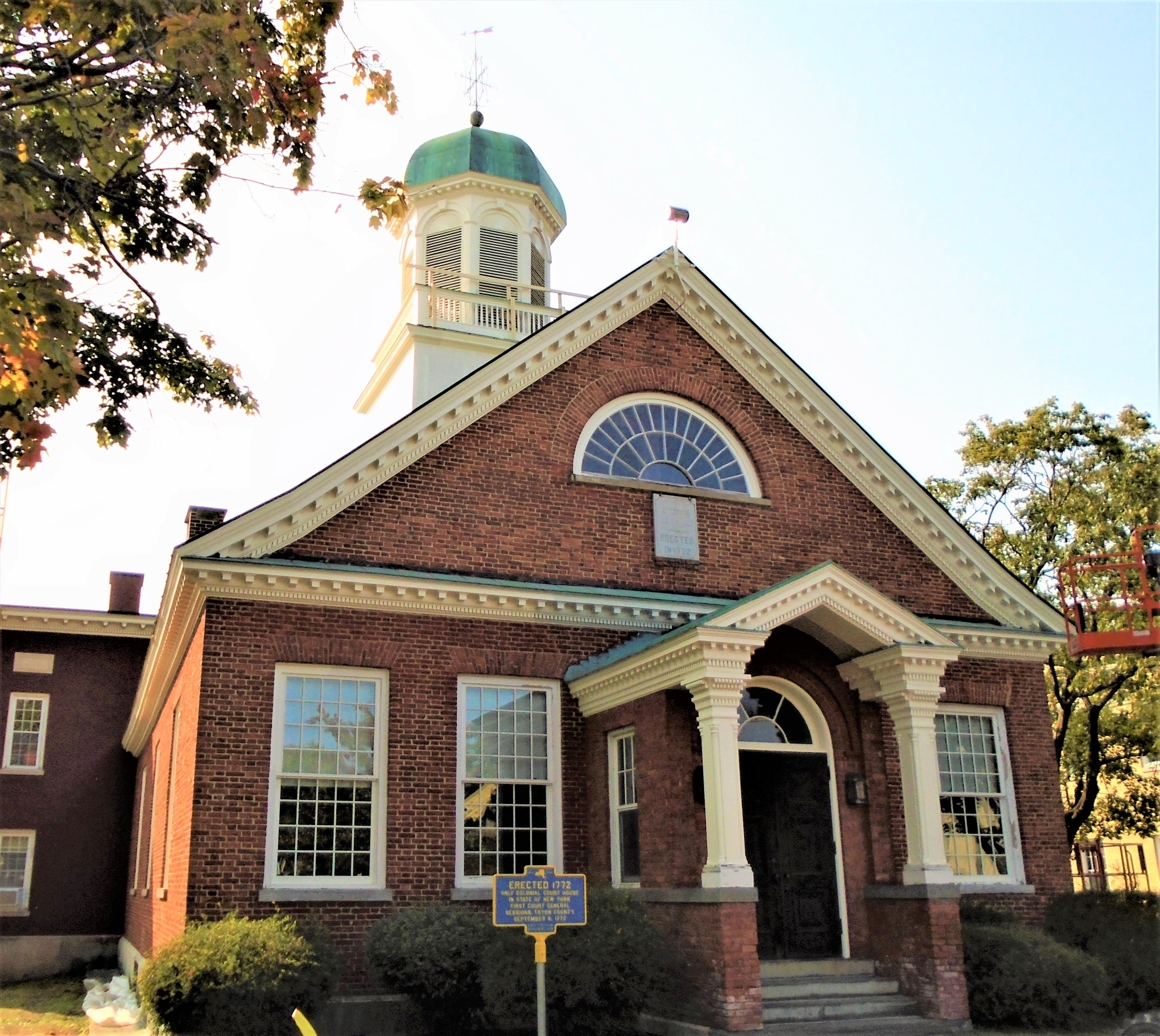
- (2020)

- Location within New York Location within the United States
- Interactive map showing the location for Fulton County Courthouse
- Location: N. William St., Johnstown, New York
- Coordinates: 43°0′24″N 74°22′32″W
- Built: 1773
- Architect: Samuel Fuller, et al.
- Architectural style: Late Georgian
- NRHP reference No.: 72000841
- Added to NRHP: July 24, 1972

The Fulton County Courthouse, originally the Tryon County Courthouse, and for a time the Montgomery County Courthouse, is a historic courthouse building located on North William Street at the corner of West Main Street in Johnstown, Fulton County, New York. It was built in 1772 to 1773 and is a Late Georgian style public building. It is the oldest existing Court House in the State of New York and one of the oldest in the United States still being used as a Court House. It was the county courthouse for Tryon and Montgomery Counties until May, 1836, when the county seat was moved to Fonda. After a time in private hands, it became the courthouse for the new Fulton County, created in April, 1838.

The courthouse is a 1 1/2-story brick structure, five bays wide and three bays deep. It features a bellcast gable roof with a cupola dating to the late 18th or early 19th century. Sir William Johnson, 1st Baronet (1715–1774) contributed £500 toward the construction of the building.

It was listed on the National Register of Historic Places in 1972.
