= Northville Pond =

Lake at Northville, New York, United States

- Location within New York Location within the United States
- Location: Fulton County, New York, United States
- Coordinates: 43.1306°N 74.1008°W
- Type: Lake
- Primary inflows: Hunters Creek
- Primary outflows: Great Sacandaga Lake
- Basin countries: United States
- Surface area: 58 acres (0.23 km^{2})
- Average depth: 10 feet (3.0 m)
- Max. depth: 35 feet (11 m)
- Shore length^{1}: 2.5 miles (4.0 km)
- Surface elevation: 781 feet (238 m)
- Settlements: Northville, New York
- ^{1} Shore length is not a well-defined measure.

Northville Pond is a lake that is located by Northville, New York. Fish species present in the lake are rainbow trout, pumpkinseed sunfish, and brown bullhead. There is a carry down off South Main Street in Northville.
