= Northville High School (New York) =

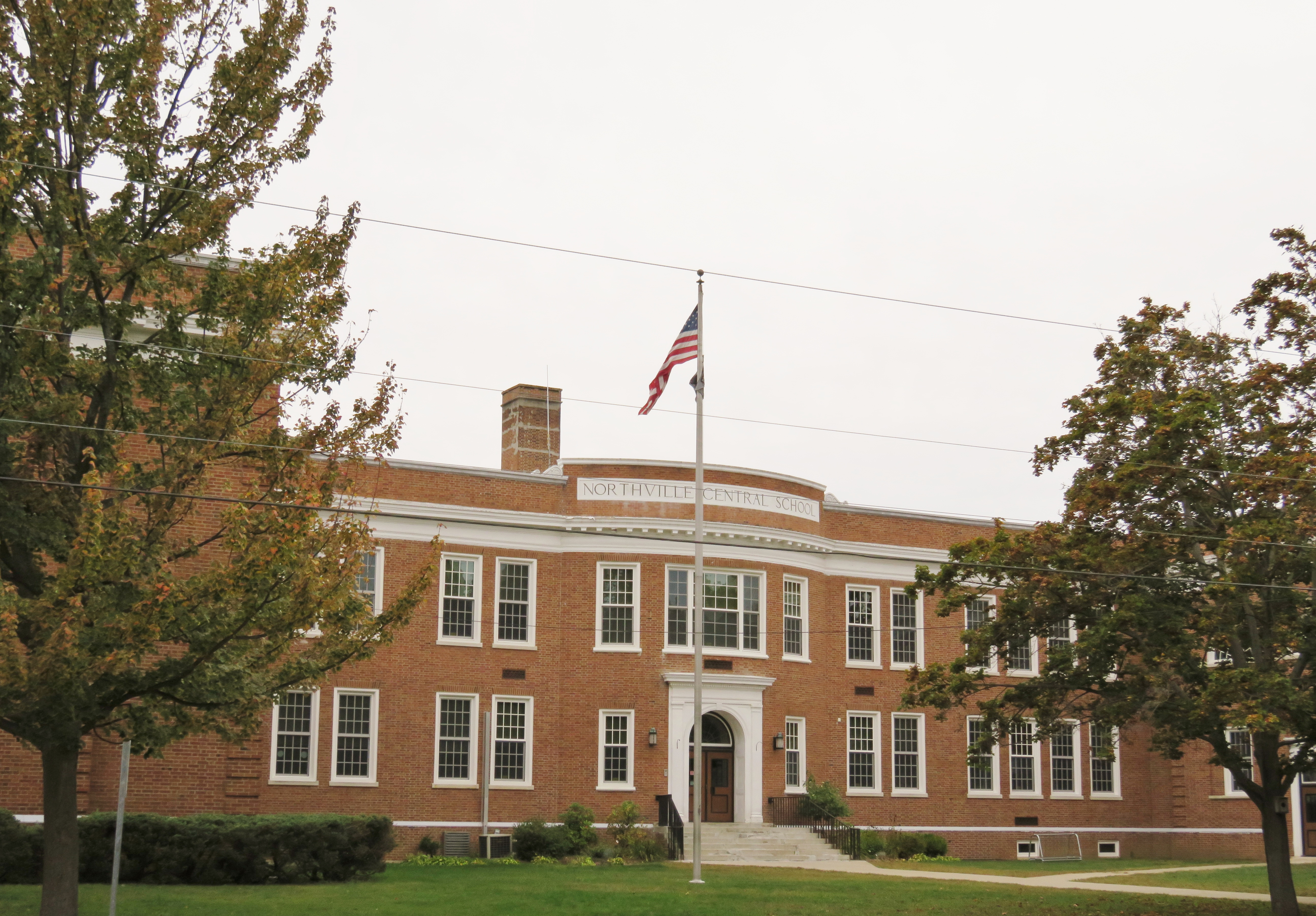
- Northville Central School in upstate New York

Location
- 131 South Third Street; Northville, (Fulton County), New York 12134; United States
- Coordinates: 43.2249°N 74.1762°W

Information
- School type: Public school (government funded), combined middle and high school
- School district: Northville Central School District
- NCES District ID: 3621300
- Superintendent: Sarah A. Chauncey
- CEEB code: 334235
- NCES School ID: 362130003038
- Principal: Samuel Ratti
- Faculty: 24.40 (on an FTE basis)
- Grades: 6–12
- Gender: Coeducational
- Enrollment: 265 (2019-20)
- Student to teacher ratio: 10.86
- Campus: Rural: Distant
- Colors: Blue and White
- Mascot: Falcons
- Website: www.northvillecsd.org/middle-high-school/

Northville High School is a public high school located in Northville, Fulton County, New York, and is the only high school operated by the Northville Central School District.
