= St. John's Episcopal Church (Johnstown, New York) =

Historic church in New York, United States

- U.S. National Register of Historic Places
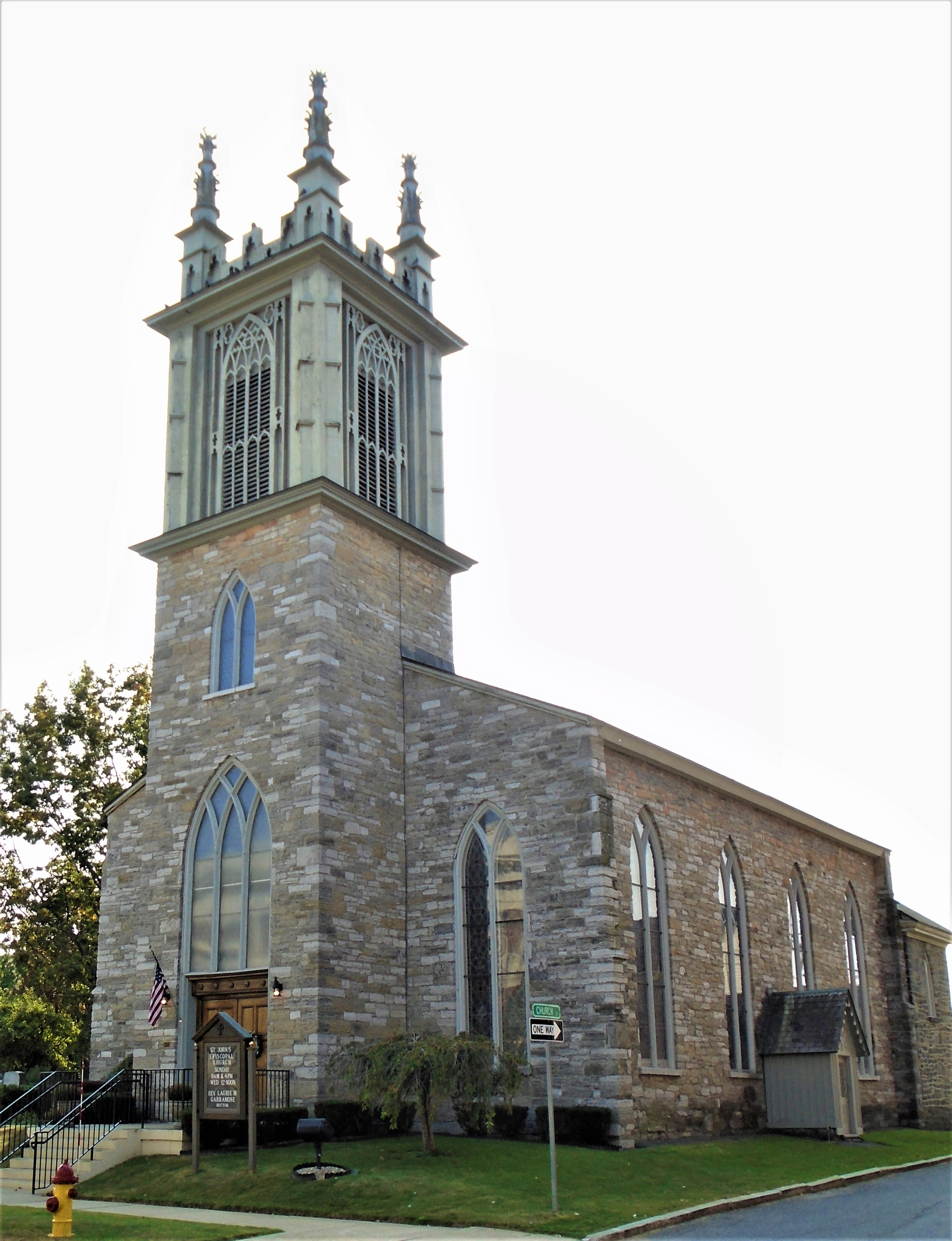
- (2020)

- Location within New York Location within the United States
- Location: 1 North Market St., Johnstown, New York
- Coordinates: 43°0′24″N 74°22′24″W
- Built: 1837
- NRHP reference No.: 04001054
- Added to NRHP: September 24, 2004

St. John's Episcopal Church is a historic Episcopal church at 1 North Market Street in Johnstown, Fulton County, New York. It was listed on the National Register of Historic Places in 2004.

It consists of a rectangular, gable roofed main block and an attached parish hall wing. The main block of the church was completed in 1837 and consists of tall random ashlar stone walls and engaged stone entrance / bell tower. It features Gothic details. Extensive renovations on the building took place in 1911. Located on the property is the grave of church founder and colonial leader Sir William Johnson, 1st Baronet (1715–1774).

It is the second church on this site; the original church having burned in 1836.
