= Northville Historic District (New York) =

Historic district in New York, United States

- U.S. National Register of Historic Places
- U.S. Historic district
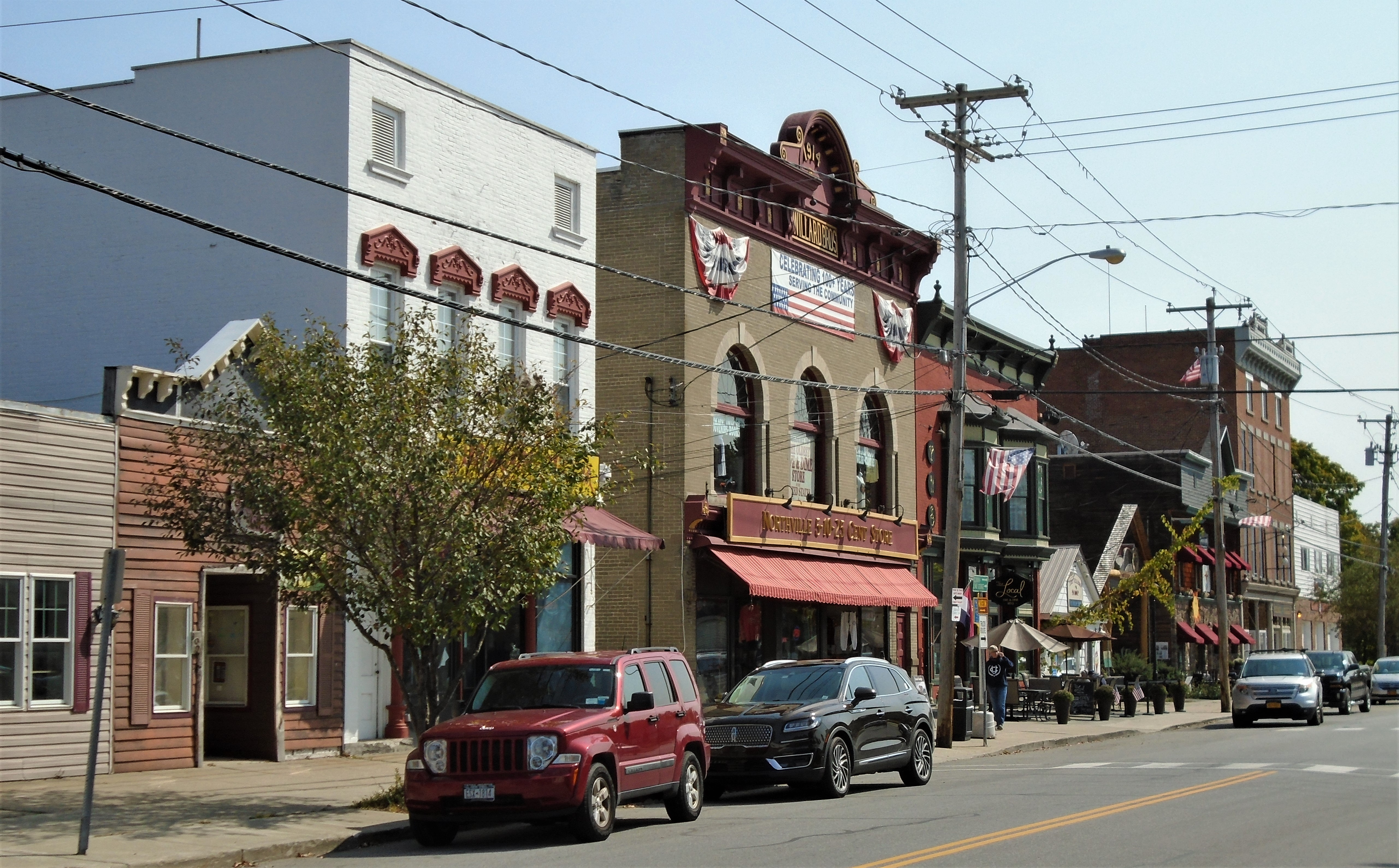
- Main Street (2020)

- Location within New York Location within the United States
- Location: Roughly Main, Division & Bridge Sts., Northville, New York
- Coordinates: 43°13′13″N 74°10′18″W
- Area: 85.85 acres (34.74 ha)
- Architect: Multiple
- Architectural style: Late Victorian, Late 19th and 20th Century Revivals
- NRHP reference No.: 14000191
- Added to NRHP: May 7, 2014

Northville Historic District is a national historic district located in the village of Northville in Fulton County, New York. The district is L-shaped, beginning at the southern end of South Main Street and running north to Bridge and Division Street. It continues west along those streets to the western end of the peninsula on which Northville is located.

The district includes 176 contributing buildings and 1 contributing site in the central business district and surround residential sections of Northville. The district developed between about 1819 and 1933, and includes representative examples of a variety of popular architectural styles. Notable buildings include the Ray Hubbell House (c. 1880), St. Francis Assisi Catholic Church (1896, 1922), Chequer & Kested Blacksmith Shop (c. 1870), Mosher Brothers Store (1915), Baptist Church (1903), Yates House (c. 1840), First United Methodist Church (1871), Hubbell Factory Store & Shed (c. 1910), and Star Theatre (c. 1850-70).

It was added to the National Register of Historic Places in 2014.
