= Mayfield (village), New York =

Mayfield, New York
- Village
- Location within New York Location within the United States
- Coordinates: 43°6′12″N 74°15′56″W
- Country: United States
- State: New York
- County: Fulton
- Town: Mayfield

Government
  - Mayor: Zachary Johnsen

Area
  - Total: 1.19 sq mi (3.07 km^{2})
  - Land: 1.01 sq mi (2.61 km^{2})
  - Water: 0.18 sq mi (0.47 km^{2})
- Elevation: 850 ft (259 m)

Population (2020)
  - Total: 780
  - Density: 775.2/sq mi (299.29/km^{2})
- Time zone: UTC-5 (Eastern (EST))
  - Summer (DST): UTC-4 (EDT)
- ZIP Codes: 12117 (Mayfield); 12078 (Gloversville)
- Area code: 518
- FIPS code: 36-46206
- GNIS feature ID: 0956705

Mayfield is a village in Fulton County, New York, United States, located in the center of the town of Mayfield, northeast of Gloversville. As of the 2010 census, the village population was 832.

== Geography ==
According to the United States Census Bureau, the village has a total area of 1.1 square miles (2.8 km^{2}), of which 0.89 square miles (2.3 km^{2}) is land and 0.2 square miles (0.5 km^{2}), or 16.37%, is water.

Mayfield is at the southwestern end of Great Sacandaga Lake and at the southern edge of the Adirondack Park. The village is located on the north side of Mayfield Lake, where Mayfield Creek enters the lake.

New York State Route 30 passes the western side of the village, leading northeast 10 miles (16 km) to Northville and south 14 miles (23 km) to Amsterdam. Route 30A branches off just west of the village limits, leading southwest 6 miles (10 km) to Gloversville and 10 miles (16 km) to Johnstown, the Fulton County seat.

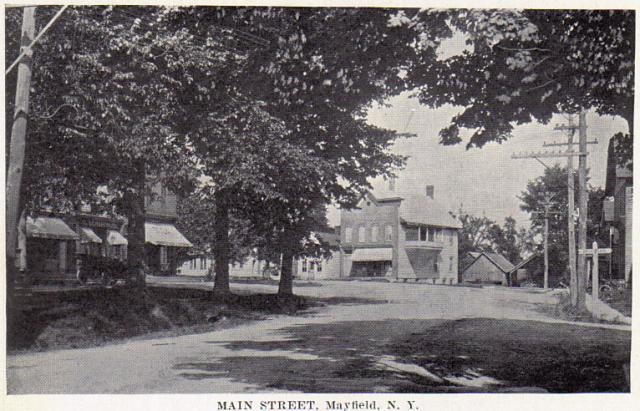
Main Street (ndg)

== History ==
The village was incorporated in 1896.

== Demographics ==
Historical population
| Census | Pop. | Note | %± |
|---|---|---|---|
| 1880 | 219 | | — |
| 1900 | 589 | | — |
| 1910 | 590 | | 0.2% |
| 1920 | 592 | | 0.3% |
| 1930 | 722 | | 22.0% |
| 1940 | 759 | | 5.1% |
| 1950 | 761 | | 0.3% |
| 1960 | 818 | | 7.5% |
| 1970 | 981 | | 19.9% |
| 1980 | 944 | | −3.8% |
| 1990 | 817 | | −13.5% |
| 2000 | 800 | | −2.1% |
| 2010 | 832 | | 4.0% |
| 2020 | 780 | | −6.2% |
U.S. Decennial Census

As of the census of 2000, there were 800 people, 307 households, and 221 families residing in the village. The population density was 896.9 inhabitants per square mile (346.3/km^{2}). There were 349 housing units at an average density of 391.3 per square mile (151.1/km^{2}). The racial makeup of the village was 98.38% White, 0.50% Black or African American, 0.75% Native American, and 0.38% from two or more races. Hispanic or Latino of any race were 0.75% of the population.

There were 309 households, out of which 37.5% had children under the age of 18 living with them, 51.1% were married couples living together, 16.5% had a female householder with no husband present, and 28.2% were non-families. 22.0% of all households were made up of individuals, and 10.0% had someone living alone who was 65 years of age or older. The average household size was 2.59 and the average family size was 3.00.

In the village, the population was spread out, with 29.5% under the age of 18, 8.0% from 18 to 24, 29.6% from 25 to 44, 17.8% from 45 to 64, and 15.1% who were 65 years of age or older. The median age was 36 years. For every 100 females, there were 86.5 males. For every 100 females age 18 and over, there were 84.9 males.

The median income for a household in the village was $35,781, and the median income for a family was $39,792. Males had a median income of $30,139 versus $21,620 for females. The per capita income for the village was $15,604. About 8.7% of families and 10.8% of the population were below the poverty line, including 14.1% of those under age 18 and 6.3% of those age 65 or over.
