= Northampton, Fulton County, New York =

- Town
- Location within New York Location within the United States
- Coordinates: 43°12′N 74°10′W
- Country: United States
- State: New York
- County: Fulton

Government
  - Type: Town Council
  - Town Supervisor: James K. Groff (R)
  - Town Council: Members' List: • Darryl Roosa (R); • Colleen Cardone (R); • Molly Zullo (R); • Janine Jackson (R)

Area
  - Total: 34.7 sq mi (89.9 km^{2})
  - Land: 21.1 sq mi (54.7 km^{2})
  - Water: 13.6 sq mi (35.3 km^{2})

Population (2010 census)
  - Total: 2,670
  - Density: 126/sq mi (48.8/km^{2})
- ZIP Codes: 12134 (Northville); 12117 (Mayfield); 12025 (Broadalbin)
- Website: townnorthampton.digitaltowpath.org:10820/content

Northampton is a town in Fulton County, New York, United States. The population was 2,670 at the 2010 census. The name comes from an original land patent. Northampton is in the northeastern corner of the county and is northeast of Gloversville. The town is known for the village of Northville, a major Adirondack community; and the Great Sacandaga Lake, which composes around 40% of the town.

== History ==
The town is derived from the Northampton Patent of 1741. and was formed from part of the northern part of the town of Broadalbin in 1799.

In 1930, the Sacandaga Reservoir was created, submerging some of what was once dry land and swamp area beneath the surface of the lake.

== Geography ==
According to the United States Census Bureau, the town has a total area of 34.7 square miles (89.9 km^{2}), of which 21.1 square miles (54.7 km^{2}) is land and 13.6 square miles (35.3 km^{2}), or 39.20%, is water.

The northern town line is the border of Hamilton County, and the eastern town line is the border of Saratoga County.

The northwestern end of Great Sacandaga Lake (formerly called the Great Sacandaga Reservoir) is in the town, where the Sacandaga River enters the lake at the village of Northville. When the Great Sacandaga Lake was formed, several island were created. The town is cut into three parts on account of the lake.

Northampton lies within the Adirondack Park.

New York State Route 30 is a north–south highway passing through the town.

== Demographics ==
Historical population
Census	Pop.	Note	%±
1820	1,291		—
1830	1,392		7.8%
1840	1,526		9.6%
1850	1,701		11.5%
1860	1,937		13.9%
1870	1,927		−0.5%
1880	2,069		7.4%
1890	1,992		−3.7%
1900	2,226		11.7%
1910	2,228		0.1%
1920	2,191		−1.7%
1930	1,919		−12.4%
1940	1,761		−8.2%
1950	1,925		9.3%
1960	2,033		5.6%
1970	2,379		17.0%
1980	2,829		18.9%
1990	2,705		−4.4%
2000	2,760		2.0%
2010	2,670		−3.3%
2014 (est.)	2,605		−2.4%
U.S. Decennial Census

As of the census of 2000, there were 2,760 people, 1,163 households, and 782 families residing in the town. The population density was 131.1 inhabitants per square mile (50.6/km^{2}). There were 1,962 housing units at an average density of 93.2 per square mile (36.0/km^{2}). The racial makeup of the town was 98.26% White, 0.33% African American, 0.07% Native American, 0.29% Asian, 0.25% from other races, and 0.80% from two or more races. Hispanic or Latino of any race were 1.09% of the population.

There were 1,163 households, out of which 25.5% had children under the age of 18 living with them, 54.1% were married couples living together, 8.3% had a female householder with no husband present, and 32.7% were non-families. 26.7% of all households were made up of individuals, and 13.5% had someone living alone who was 65 years of age or older. The average household size was 2.37 and the average family size was 2.85.

In the town, the population was spread out, with 21.8% under the age of 18, 7.3% from 18 to 24, 25.0% from 25 to 44, 28.1% from 45 to 64, and 17.8% who were 65 years of age or older. The median age was 42 years. For every 100 females, there were 100.1 males. For every 100 females age 18 and over, there were 96.5 males.

The median income for a household in the town was $37,420, and the median income for a family was $44,896. Males had a median income of $32,900 versus $20,938 for females. The per capita income for the town was $18,997. About 6.2% of families and 11.0% of the population were below the poverty line, including 16.9% of those under age 18 and 7.4% of those age 65 or over.

== Communities and locations in Northampton ==
- Carpenters Corners – A hamlet on the southeastern border with Northville, located on County Road 113.
- Fairchilds Corners – A location southeast of Carpenters Corners.
- Fish House – A hamlet in the southeastern corner of the town. It is separated from the rest of the town by Great Sacandaga Lake. It was first settled around 1762 as a fishing retreat for Sir William Johnson. The Godfrey Shew House was listed on the National Register of Historic Places in 2006.
- Hampton Point – A projection into the lake, southwest of Northville.
- Hunters Creek – A stream north of Northville.
- Kenyon Islands – Two islands in the Great Sacandaga Lake.
- Mead Island – An island in Great Sacandaga Lake near the shoreline.
- Northville – A village located where the Sacandaga River enters Great Sacandaga Lake and is just east of NY-30. It is the primary settlement in the town.
- Northville Pond – A lake located in the village of Northville.
- Sacandaga Park – A hamlet on the western shore of Great Sacandaga Lake and on NY-30, near the junction of County Road 143. The Sacandaga Railroad Station was listed on the National Register of Historic Places in 2003.
- Sweets Crossing – A hamlet in the western part of the town on NY-30.
- Tamarack Swamp – A swamp on the town line, west of Sweets Crossing.
- Woodward Lake – A small lake west of Northville.

== Notable person ==
- Julia Colman (1828–1909), American temperance educator, activist, editor and writer
- Sidney Dillon (1812–1892) was an American railroad executive and one of the US's premier railroad builders.
- Very Rev. Jay Atherton (b. 1982), a priest of the Roman Catholic Diocese of Albany and the current Rector of the Cathedral of the Immaculate Conception, Albany, attended Northville Schools and lived in the town.
