= Rose Knox =

American businesswoman (1857–1950)

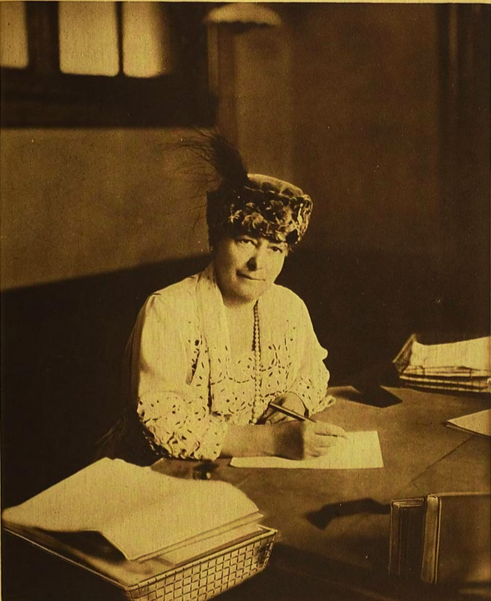
- Rose Knox, from a 1921 publication
- Born: Rose Markward; November 18, 1857; Mansfield, Ohio, U.S.
- Died: September 27, 1950 (aged 92); Johnstown, New York, U.S.
- Other names: Mrs. Charles B. Knox
- Occupation: Businesswoman
- Years active: 1908–1947
- Spouse: Charles Briggs Knox
- Children: 3

Rose Knox also known as Mrs. Charles B. Knox (née Markward; November 18, 1857–September 27, 1950) was an American businesswoman, who ran the Charles B. Knox Gelatine Company and, beginning in 1916, was vice president of Kind & Landesmann, later renamed Kind & Knox, a gelatine factory in Camden, New Jersey. She became president of Knox Gelatine in 1908 after her husband Charles died. She won wide respect as one of the leading businesswomen of her time.

== Early life and education ==
Knox was one of three girls born to David and Amanda Markward of Mansfield, Ohio. In the late 1870s, Rose and her family moved to Gloversville, New York, where she lived until 1896. Rose met her husband, Charles Briggs Knox, in 1881, and they married on February 15, 1883. Together, Rose and Charles had three children: a girl who died in childhood, and two sons, one of whom died in early adulthood. In 1890, the family moved to Johnstown to set up a gelatin business, after Charles Knox watched Rose making gelatine in her kitchen. The Charles B. Knox Gelatine Company was located in a large four-story factory building. Mr. and Mrs. Knox were very close: Charles shared all his business affairs with his wife, making them partners in the business. Rose wrote recipe booklets promoting Knox's gelatine product, over a million of which were distributed each year. Progressive for his time, Charles also allocated his wife a weekly allowance which she could do with as she pleased. That taught Rose how to handle and budget money, which came in handy when she was running the gelatine business herself.

== Career ==
Knox became a businesswoman when her husband died in 1908, taking over his Knox Gelatine Factory. By relating personally to her consumers, putting recipes in her ads, cultivating home economists and researching the health values of gelatine, she built Knox Gelatine into the number one unflavored gelatine in the U.S. She made notable changes to the business. The first day she was there, she permanently closed the factory's back door, stating that all men and women were equal and that was the way she was going to be treating them: there was no need to have two separate doors. Among her most famous changes was to create a five-day work week for her workers, and she also gave them paid vacation and unlimited sick leave, which were rare at the time. Mrs. Knox survived the Depression without having to release any of her workers. She was a Presbyterian in religion and a Republican in politics. She died aged 92, in 1950.

== Community activities ==
In 1930, Mrs. Knox donated a 15-acre athletic field complex to the Johnstown School district, with tennis courts, bleachers, baseball diamonds, an illuminated football field and a fieldhouse. In Johnstown, she was president of the Board for the Willing Helpers Home for aged women, the Federation of Women's Clubs for Civic Improvement, and the Aldine Society. She was also vice president of Johnstown's historical society and a founding member of the Business and Professional Women's Association in Johnstown.

== Honors ==
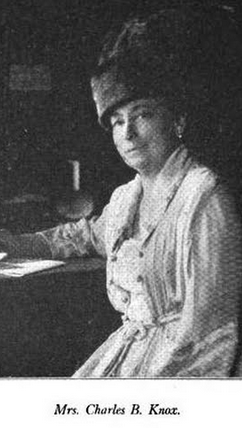
Rose Knox, from a 1920 publication

Rose Knox, as one of the first nationally recognized businesswomen in New York State, received many honors in her lifetime. In 1922, she was called "one of America's Greatest Women" by Pictorial Review. She became the first woman on the board of directors of the American Grocery Manufacturers Association in 1924. In 1937, Mrs. Knox was called "the biggest woman industrialist in the country" and cited by Fortune as one of the 16 women who epitomized success in America's "vital industries." She was also given an Achievement award for her marked success in business by the New York State Federation of Business and Professional Women. And in 1950, the story of her life was told on "Cavalcade of America," broadcast from New York. In March 2007, she was honored during Women's History Month as a New York State Woman of Distinction.

== Works and publications ==
- Knox's gelatine: 70 easy delicious desserts made from Knox's sparkling calves foot gelatine, the new granulated package, 1896.
  - Food economy; recipes for left-overs and plain desserts, 1917.
  - Dainty Desserts for Dainty People (author cited as Rose Markward, her maiden name) 1894, 1896.
