= Battle of West Canada Creek =

1781 battle of the American Revolutionary War

Coordinates: 43.070°N 74.956°W

- Part of the American Revolutionary War
Date	September 7, 1781
Location	Herkimer, New York
Result	Anglo-Haudenosaunee victory

Belligerents
United States; Oneida	Great Britain; Onondaga; Cayuga

Commanders and leaders
Capt. Solomon Woodworth †	Lt. Joseph Clement; Chief Deigwanda

Strength
46 Levies; 6 Oneida	74 Onondaga, Cayuga, and Butler's Rangers

Casualties and losses
22 killed 3 wounded 8 taken prisoner	2 wounded

The Battle of West Canada Creek or Fairfield Battle was a frontier battle during the American Revolutionary War near New York's Mohawk Valley between American and Oneida forces led by Captain-Lieutenant Solomon Woodworth of Col. Marinus Willett's regiment of New York Levies and British, Onondaga, and Cayuga forces under command of Lt. Joseph Clement of Butler's Rangers, and Onondaga Chief Deigwanda. The battle occurred three and a half miles north of Herkimer, NY, in a ravine about a mile east of the West Canada Creek. The result was a British-allied victory with the death of Captain Woodworth, his officers and much of his company.
