= Frederick Visscher =

American militia officer and politician (1741–1809)

Frederick Visscher (also spelled Fisher; February 12, 1741 - June 9, 1809) was a colonial and Revolutionary War Militia officer, public servant, State Assemblyman, and Judge from Tryon (later Montgomery County), New York. He was severely wounded during the Caughnawaga Raid in the Revolutionary War.

== Early life ==
The Visscher family were early settlers of the Mohawk Valley, and Frederick's father, Harman acquired 1000 acres in the Hansen Patent near present-day Tribes Hill. Frederick Visscher was active in public affairs and enlisted in the Albany County Militia in 1767. When Tryon County was split from Albany County in 1772, he was commissioned lieutenant in the 3rd regiment of Tryon County Militia. In 1768, he married Gesina De Graff and had at least seven children.

== Revolutionary War ==
Upon the outbreak of the war, Visscher was reportedly the only one out of a crowd of about 300 to stand alone and declare himself as an opposer of the British government. Frederick Visscher was appointed Colonel of the Third Regiment by the Tryon County Committee of Safety on August 26, 1775. In August 1777, he led his regiment to German Flatts in response to the alarm at Fort Schuyler. Under Brigadier General Nicholas Herkimer, Col. Visscher's regiment marched to relieve the fort of the besieging forces of Brevet General Barry St. Leger and his Haudenosaunee allies. The column was ambushed at Oriskany on August 6, and Colonel Visscher's regiment was reportedly chased off, and Visscher was wounded.

In April 1779, Col. Visscher's regiment aided in the construction of the Sacondaga Blockhouse in Mayfield, also called Fort Fisher.

On May 22, 1780, Col. Visscher's family home was attacked by a party of Haudenosaunee warriors under command of Sir John Johnson. Two of the Colonel's brothers, John and Harman were killed, and Frederick was tomahawked, scalped, and had his throat slit. Col. Visscher survived and was able to rescue his mother before the house was engulfed in flames. Sir John Johnson reported that Colonel Visscher was killed, but he survived. He arrived in Schenectady the next day and his severe wounds were treated.

In the summer of 1782, General George Washington visited Schenectady and a dinner party was held in his honor. General Washington personally invited Col. Visscher to sit beside him.

== Later life ==
After the war, Visscher was commissioned Brigadier General of the Montgomery County Militia, and retired in 1787. He also served in the New York State Assembly. Visscher built a new home on the site of his family home that was destroyed during the war. The 1790 census shows he owned two slaves.
