= Northville, Fulton County, New York =

- Village
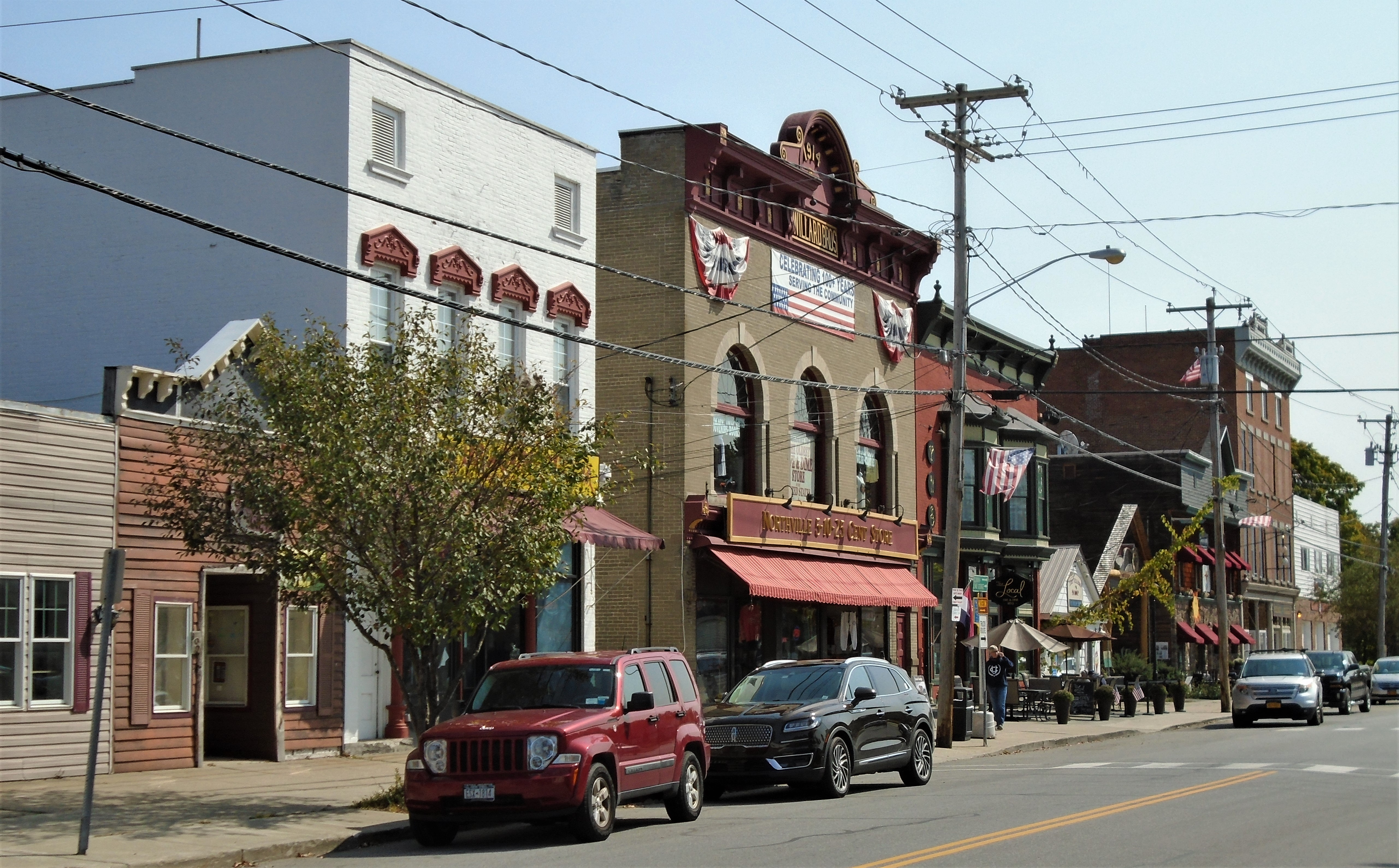
- Main Street (2020)

- Location within New York Location within the United States
- Coordinates: 43°13.5′N 74°10.5′W
- Country: United States
- State: New York
- County: Fulton
- Town: Northampton

Area
  - Total: 1.41 sq mi (3.64 km^{2})
  - Land: 1.06 sq mi (2.75 km^{2})
  - Water: 0.34 sq mi (0.89 km^{2}) 24.11%
- Elevation: 807 ft (246 m)

Population (2020)
  - Total: 993
  - Density: 934.5/sq mi (360.82/km^{2})
- Time zone: UTC-5 (Eastern (EST))
  - Summer (DST): UTC-4 (EDT)
- ZIP code: 12134
- Area code: 518
- FIPS code: 36-53770
- GNIS feature ID: 0958987
- Website: www.villageofnorthville.com

Northville is a village in the northern part of the town of Northampton in Fulton County, New York, United States, northeast of Gloversville. The population was 993 at the 2020 census. It lies within Adirondack Park and serves as the southern terminus for the Northville-Placid Trail.

== History ==
The site of the village was first settled around 1786, but areas south of the village were settled around 1762. The village was once on high ground between the Sacandaga River and Hunters Creek. When the river was dammed in 1930 to form the Sacandaga Reservoir, now called Great Sacandaga Lake, the river valley became an arm of the lake. The village now lies on a peninsula surrounded by the lake, with three bridges connecting it on the west, east and south. The arm of the Great Sacandaga Lake to the east is known locally as Northville Lake or the "Little Lake".

Main Street was surveyed and laid out in 1797, and the first store was opened there in 1800, and other stores followed soon thereafter. The population, however, grew slowly: by 1807 there were only seven families living on Main Street. The first brick building in the settlement was constructed in 1819.

A post office was opened in 1824 and in 1827 adopted the name "Northville." By 1835 Northville had become a regional financial center, and began to attract fishermen, hunters and tourists around 1850. A map published in 1868 showed that the village was mainly concentrated on Main Street, although there was a residential development on Bridge and First Streets, and a cluster of industrial buildings on Mechanic Street. Second, Third, Fourth, Centre and Grove Streets had been laid out but were largely empty.

The village was incorporated in 1873, within the town of Northampton. At that time the lumber industry, with its associated milling, cooperage, tanning and woodenware industries, has created a boomtown in Northville and in the hamlet of Sacandaga Park, across the Sacandage River. There were hotels and entertainment halls, and the area was connected by railroad when the Gloversville and Northville (G&N) was completed in 1875 Three years later, the village's population had reached 1,000.

In the late 19th century, The development of the Sacandaga Park resort by the Fonda, Johnstown, and Gloversville (FJ&G) nearby Northville helped Northville's economy grow, as tourists flocked to the "Coney Island of the North". Hotels were built and the FJ&G built a new railroad station on River Street. Guests of the park would use the train service to take day trips to Northville. Businesses and industry also grow, and the village's population had almost doubled by 1880. Hunter's Creek was dammed to create a reservoir and watermains were installed on the main streets, becoming available to the public in 1891, and the village's first bank opened in 1895.

Northville continued to grow and prosper into the early 20th century. Development spread into streets that had been empty, new streets were laid out, and the population continued to grow.

The Conklingville Dam, built to control flooding on the Hudson River, of which the Sacandaga River was a tributary, was finished on March 27, 1929, bringing about the creation of the Great Sacandaga Lake. The lake came to the edge of the village, while other nearby locations, like Sacandaga Park, were fully or partially flooded. The village became a peninsula, and was now further away from connecting roads, but the reservoir did not fundamentally change the physical character of the village. The timing was unfortunate, coming as it did at the beginning of the Great Depression, and the village struggled to recover its economy in its new isolated condition. The growth of new kinds of tourism helped, as did a new emphasis on the history of the village.

The Northville Historic District was added to the National Register of Historic Places in 2014.

== Geography ==
According to the United States Census Bureau, the village has a total area of 1.4 square miles (3.6 km^{2}), of which 1.0 square mile (2.7 km^{2}) is land and 0.35 square miles (0.9 km^{2}), or 24.89%, is water.

The village is located at 43°13.5′N 74°10.5′W in the Adirondack Park on a northern extension of the Great Sacandaga Lake. The Sacandaga River enters the lake to the west of the village. The river and lake are part of the Hudson River watershed.

The village is just east of New York State Route 30, connected to the highway by a bridge over the Sacandaga River, and is also served by County Roads 143, 149, and 153. Route 30 leads north 29 miles (47 km) to Speculator in the Adirondacks and Route 30 leads south to Route 30A, 24 miles (39 km) to the village of Fonda on the Mohawk River.

== Demographics ==
Historical population
Census	Pop.	Note	%±
1880	763		—
1890	792		3.8%
1900	1,046		32.1%
1910	1,130		8.0%
1920	1,190		5.3%
1930	1,250		5.0%
1940	1,111		−11.1%
1950	1,114		0.3%
1960	1,156		3.8%
1970	1,192		3.1%
1980	1,304		9.4%
1990	1,180		−9.5%
2000	1,139		−3.5%
2010	1,099		−3.5%
2020	993		−9.6%
U.S. Decennial Census

As of the census of 2000, there were 1,139 people, 495 households, and 316 families residing in the village. The population density was 1,070.9 inhabitants per square mile (413.5/km^{2}). There were 598 housing units at an average density of 562.2 per square mile (217.1/km^{2}). The racial makeup of the village was 98.07% White, 0.44% African American, 0.70% Asian, 0.53% from other races, and 0.26% from two or more races. Hispanic or Latino of any race were 1.40% of the population.

There were 495 households, out of which 27.3% had children under the age of 18 living with them, 47.5% were married couples living together, 11.3% had a female householder with no husband present, and 36.0% were non-families. 31.3% of all households were made up of individuals, and 18.4% had someone living alone who was 65 years of age or older. The average household size was 2.30 and the average family size was 2.86.

In the village, the population was spread out, with 23.5% under the age of 18, 8.2% from 18 to 24, 23.4% from 25 to 44, 25.5% from 45 to 64, and 19.5% who were 65 years of age or older. The median age was 40 years. For every 100 females, there were 92.4 males. For every 100 females age 18 and over, there were 86.1 males.

The median income for a household in the village was $37,566, and the median income for a family was $44,792. Males had a median income of $30,391 versus $21,771 for females. The per capita income for the village was $17,808. About 10.1% of families and 13.4% of the population were below the poverty line, including 23.4% of those under age 18 and 8.4% of those age 65 or over.

== Education ==
Northville Village is in the Northville Central School District.

Northville is home to Northville High School, which is operated by the Northville Central School District.

== See also ==
- Northville Historic District

== In popular culture ==
- Northville was the setting of a 1997 two-part episode of the television series The X-Files. In the two episodes, "Tempus Fugit" and "Max", a passenger plane carrying a former alien abductee, crashed into the ground near the village of Northville. The X-Files team investigates and soon discovers a UFO at the bottom of the Great Sacandaga Lake. The production was not filmed in Northville, although the production crew did contact the village government for specific information regarding police vehicles, maps, etc.

== Gallery ==
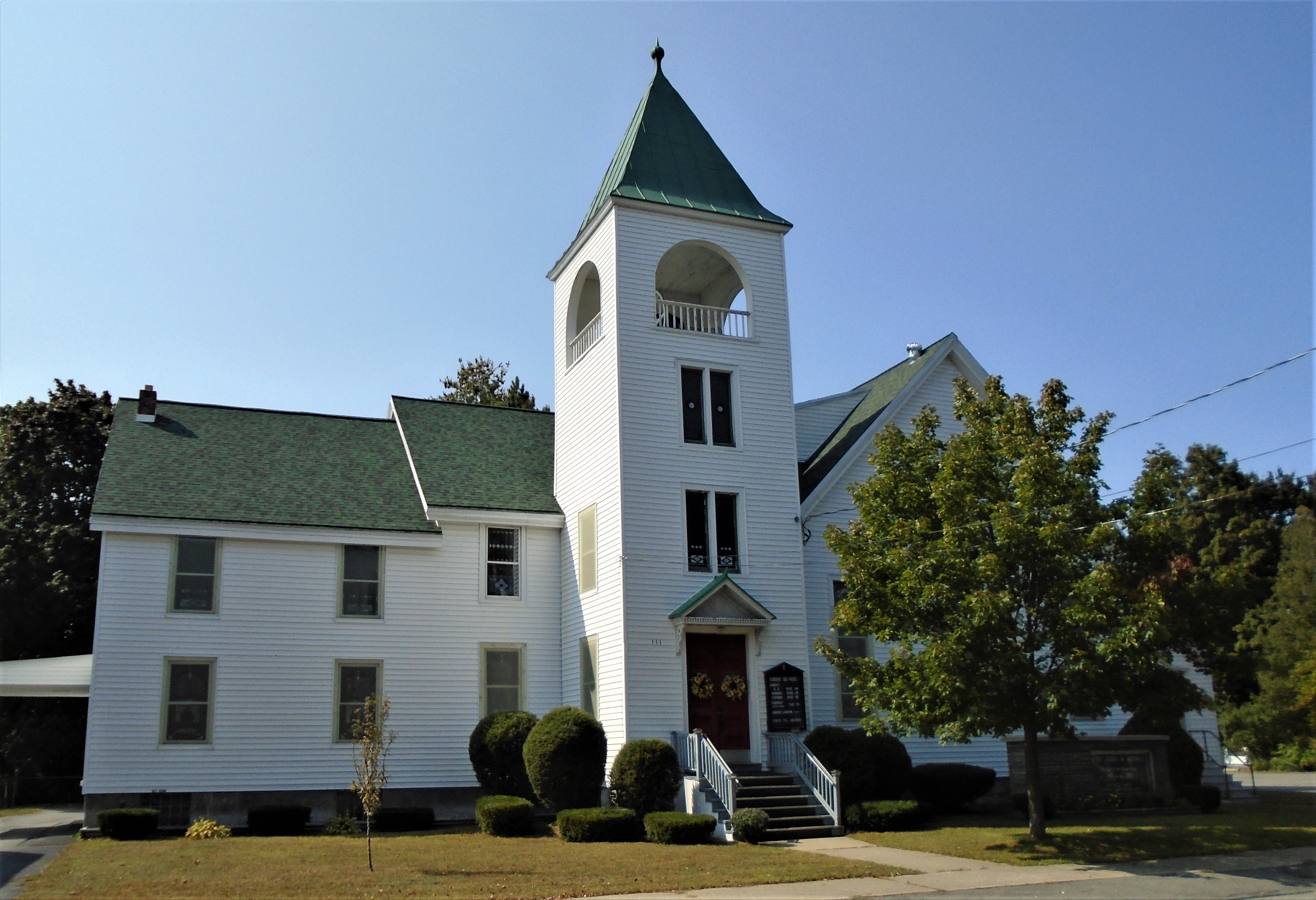
The Baptist Church of Northville was built in 1903, and is part of the Northville Historic District (NHD)

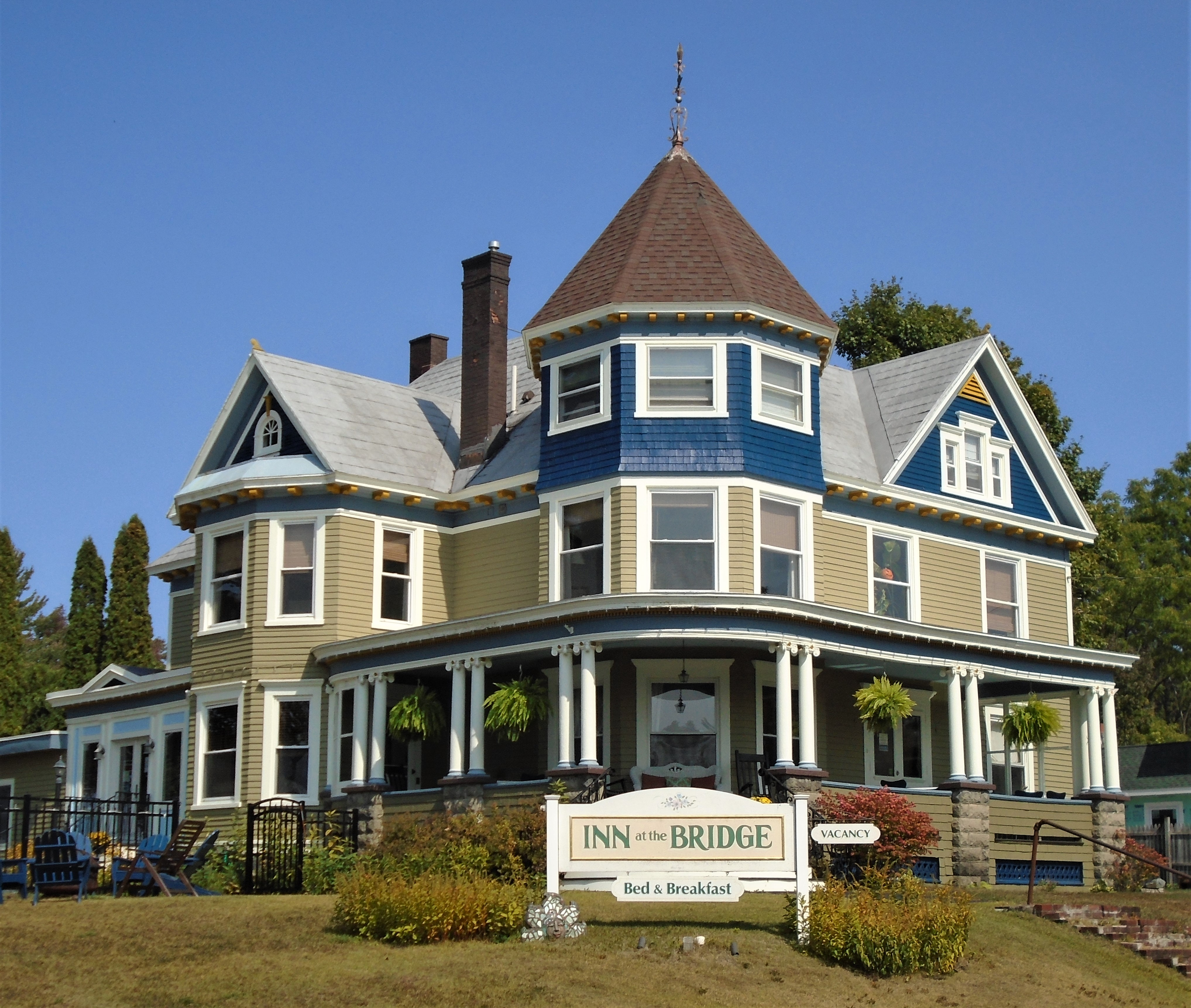
The John A Willard House, now a bed & breakfast, was built in 1903 (NHD)

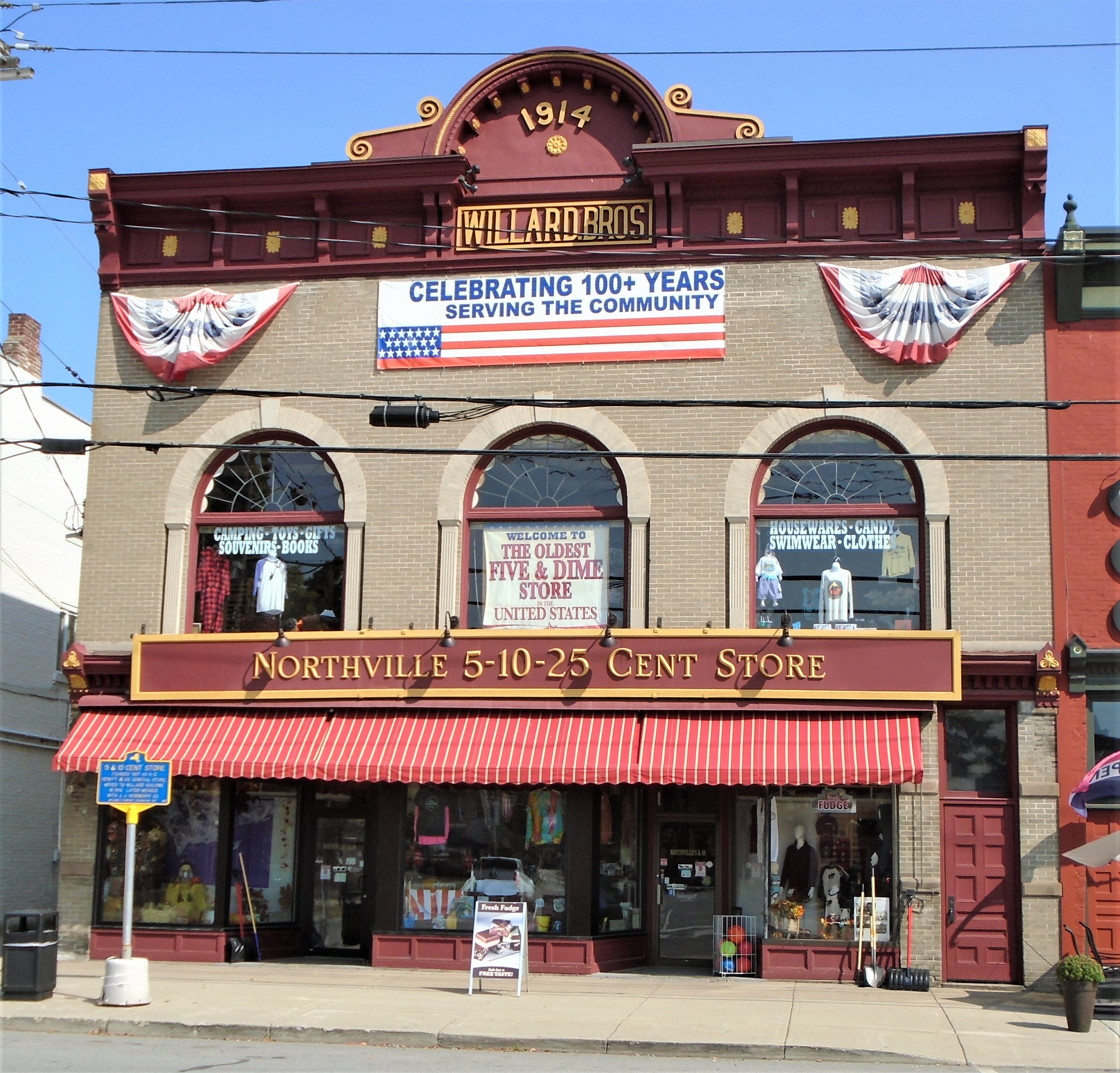
The Willard Bros. Block (1914, NHD) houses the Northville 5-10-25 Cent Store, which claims to be the oldest five-and-dime in the U.S.

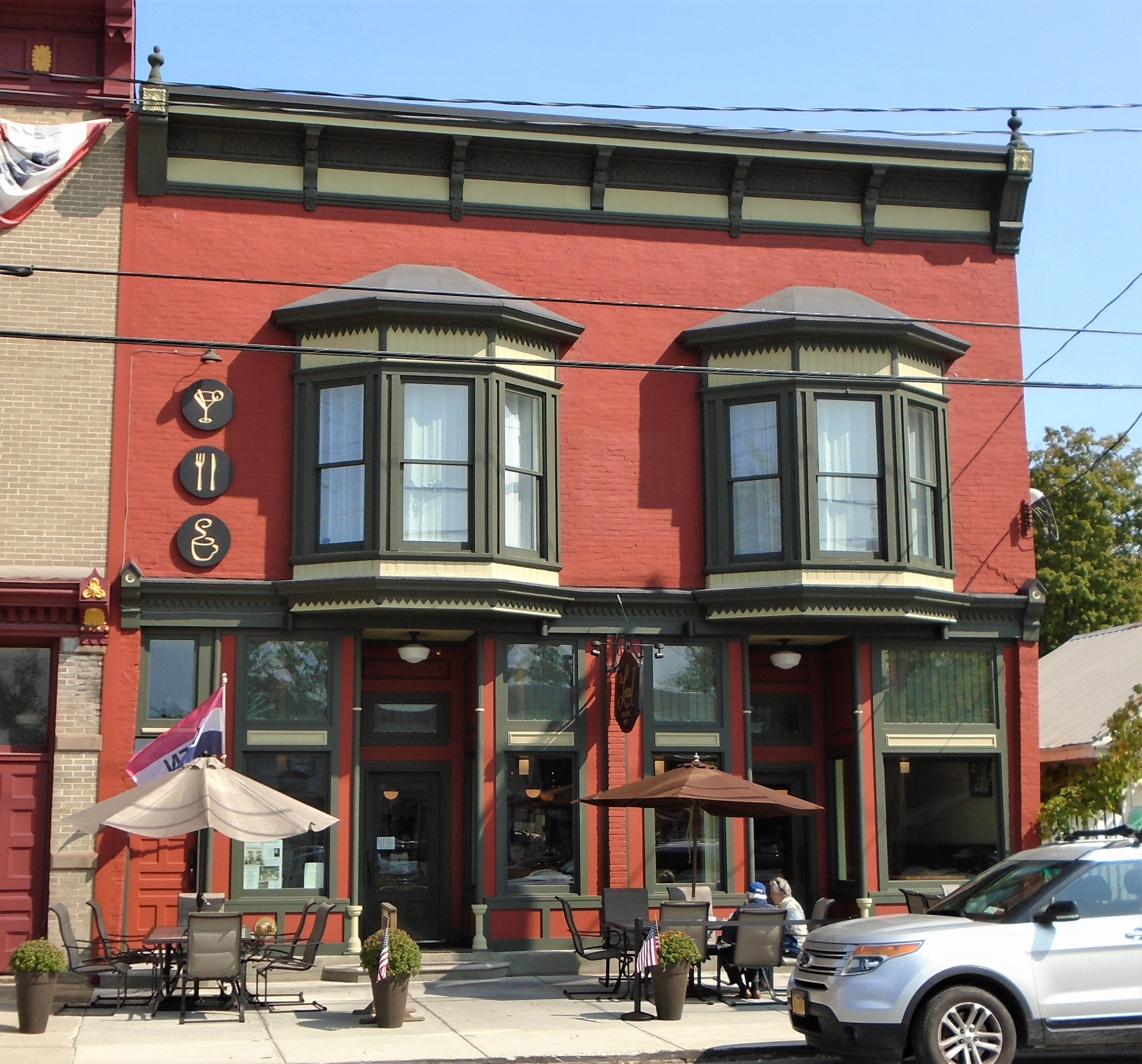
The Franklin Wright Block, now a restaurant, was built in 1890 (NHD)

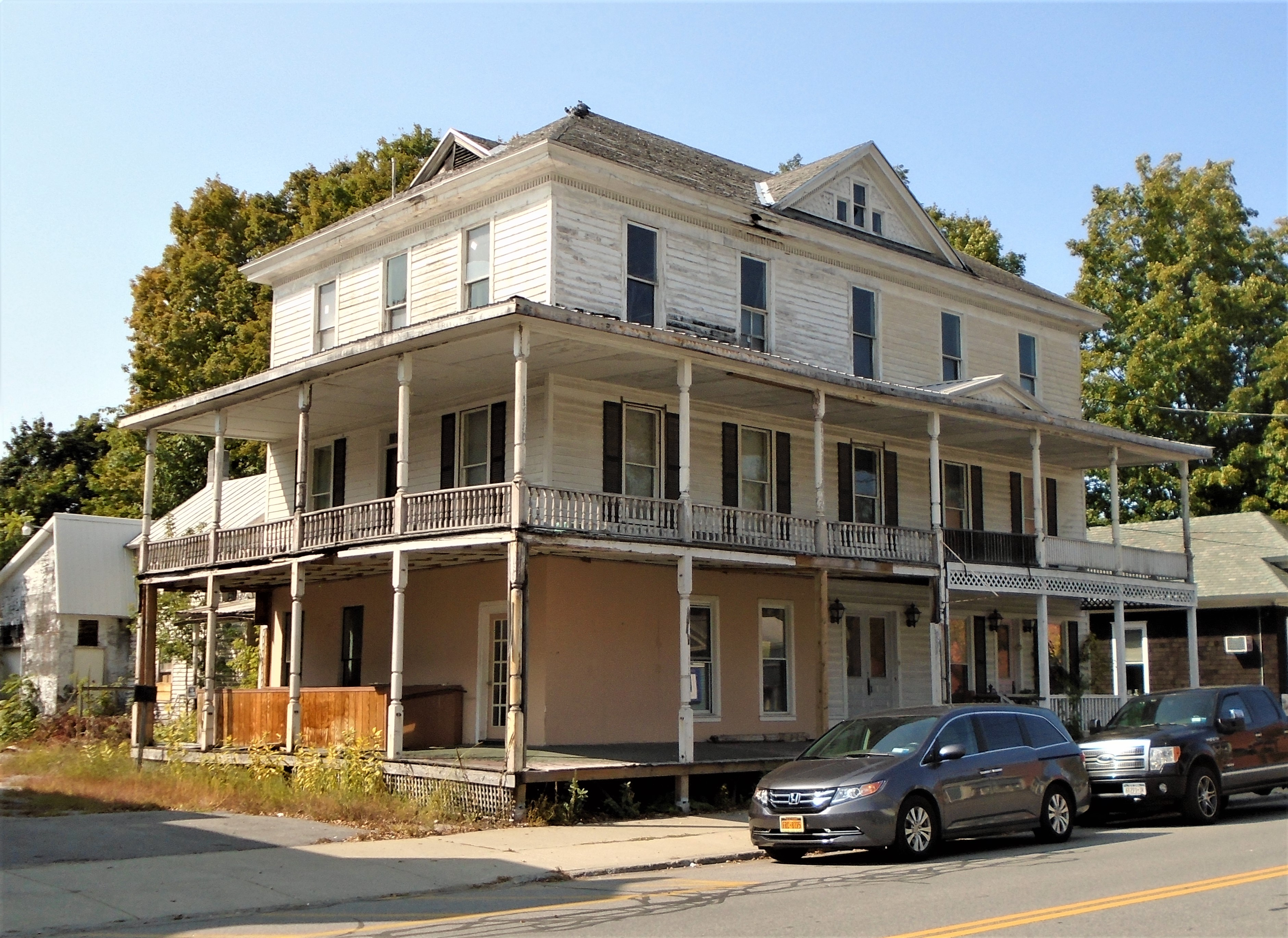
The Northville Hotel, built in 1913 but abandoned now, is the last remaining hotel building of the many that the village once had. (NHD)
