= Fulton County Jail (Johnstown, New York) =

- U.S. National Register of Historic Places
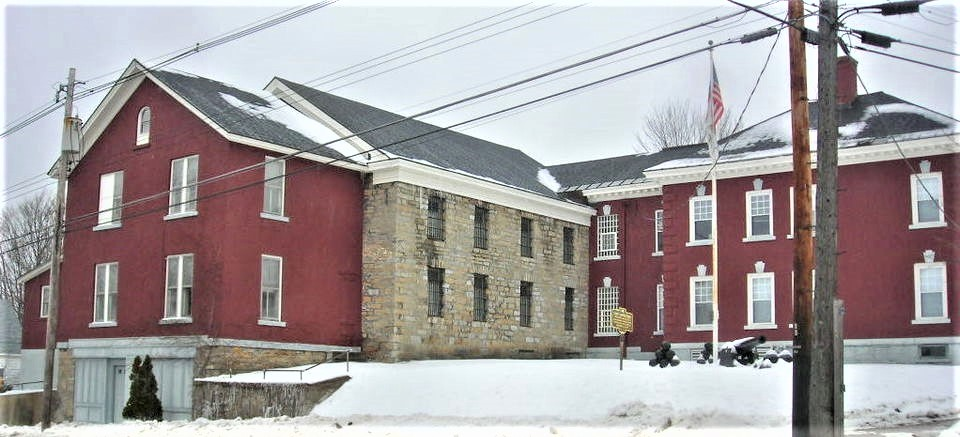
- (February 2008)

- Location within New York Location within the United States
- Location: Perry and Montgomery Sts. Johnstown, New York
- Coordinates: 43°0′11″N 74°22′16″W
- Built: 1772
- Architect: Zephaniah Batcheller, Zephaniah; Frederick Cummings
- Architectural style: Colonial Revival
- NRHP reference No.: 81000404
- Added to NRHP: October 19, 1981

The Fulton County Jail, originally the Tryon County Jail, is a historic jail complex located at the corner of Perry and Montgomery Street in Johnstown, Fulton County, New York. The original section was built in 1772-1773 and was placed on the village's highest ground to give a defensive advantage in case of an attack by Native Americans or a war. At the time, it was thought to be one of the strongest defensive positions in colonial America, due to its placement and the thick wall, which would deflect everything but the very strongest artillery.

During the Revolutionary War, it became Fort Johnstown, a military garrison and prison, with the intent of preventing enemy infiltration along the Sacandaga road. A palisade was built to surround it, with four lookout towers at the corners. It was inspected by Lafayette in 1778. In 1781, the fort was the base for 400 militiamen led by Col. Marinus Willet and Capt. John Littel, who harried a British force of 700 Loyalists and Native Americans who were retreating after burning land in the Mohawk Valley.

In 1783, the fort was visited by George Washington on his tour of the Mohawk Valley.

The original building is a simple five bays wide, two bays deep, stone building with a medium pitched gable roof. The complex consists of the original jail with additions to form a two-story, L-shaped building with a large brick wing attached to the original section and a smaller brick wing to the west. The small brick wing dates to about 1890. The larger wing, known as the sheriff's quarters, is a two-story, square block with a hipped roof in the Colonial Revival style.

The last hanging to occur on the property was Elizabeth Van Valkenburgh on January 24, 1846. Ms. Van Valkenburgh poisoned her husband's rum with arsenic, who was an alcoholic and was violent towards her and their children from time to time.

The building was an active jail until the 1970s. Fulton County Personnel and Planning Departments are currently housed within the building.

The building was listed on the National Register of Historic Places in 1981.
