= Johnstown, New York =

- City
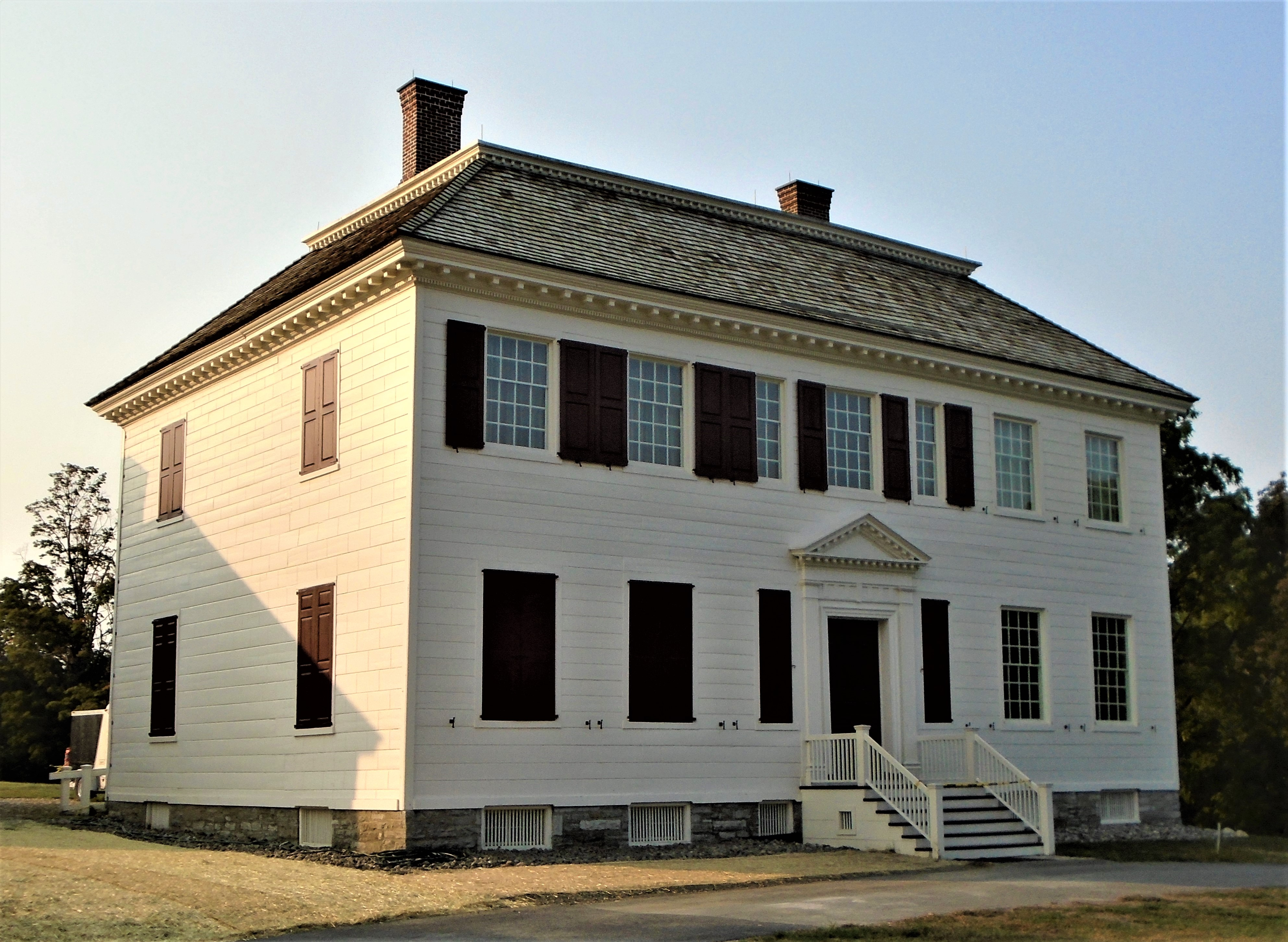
- Johnson Hall, home of Sir William Johnson, New York State Historic Site (2020)

- Location within New York Location within the United States
- Coordinates: 43°0′26″N 74°22′20″W
- Country: United States
- State: New York
- County: Fulton
- Settled: 1758
- Incorporated: 1803 (village); 1895 (city)
- Founded by: Sir William Johnson

Government
  - Type: (Mayor-Council)
  - Mayor: Amy Praught (R)
  - Common Council: Members' List: At-Large Member: • Scott Jeffers (R); • W1: Bradley Hayner (R); • W2: Scott Miller (R); • W3: Eric A. Parker (R); • W4: Maxwell A. Spritzer (D)

Area
  - Total: 4.83 sq mi (12.50 km^{2})
  - Land: 4.82 sq mi (12.49 km^{2})
  - Water: 0.0039 sq mi (0.01 km^{2})
- Elevation: 673 ft (205 m)

Population (2020)
  - Total: 8,204
  - Density: 1,701.9/sq mi (657.11/km^{2})
- Time zone: UTC-5 (Eastern (EST))
  - Summer (DST): UTC-4 (EDT)
- ZIP code: 12095
- Area code: 518
- FIPS code: 36-38781
- GNIS feature ID: 0954147
- Website: cityofjohnstown.ny.gov

Johnstown is a city in and the county seat of Fulton County in the U.S. state of New York. The city was named after its colonial founder, Sir William Johnson, Superintendent of Indian Affairs for Britain in the Province of New York and a major general during the Seven Years' War in North America. It is located approximately 45 miles (72 km) northwest of Albany, about one-third of the way between Albany and the Finger Lakes region to the west, in the Mohawk Valley region, within the foothills of the Adirondack Mountains.

The city of Johnstown is mostly surrounded by the town of Johnstown; it separated from the town when it converted from a village to a city in 1895. Adjacent to Johnstown is the City of Gloversville. The two cities are together known as the "Glove Cities" due to their history of manufacturing gloves and other leather apparel. Gloversville and Johnstown constituted the center of the American glove industry for 90 years until competition from other countries drove most manufacturers out of business.

As of the 2020 census, Johnstown had a population of 8,204.

== History ==
=== Early colonial history ===
The Irishman William Johnson came to the Province of New York from Ireland in 1738. Johnson was a trader who learned Indigenous languages and culture and formed close relationships with many Native American leaders, especially those of the Mohawk and other members of the Iroquois Confederacy. Johnson made use of his alliances and influence with the Iroquois on behalf of the British during the French and Indian War, in which he was a major general. He helped Great Britain defeat France and take over control of certain territories in North America. After the war, when control of all of Canada passed to Britain, Johnson was appointed Superintendent of Northern Indians, and took charge of all British government relations with the Native American nations bordering the Great Lakes and the colonies of New York and Pennsylvania.

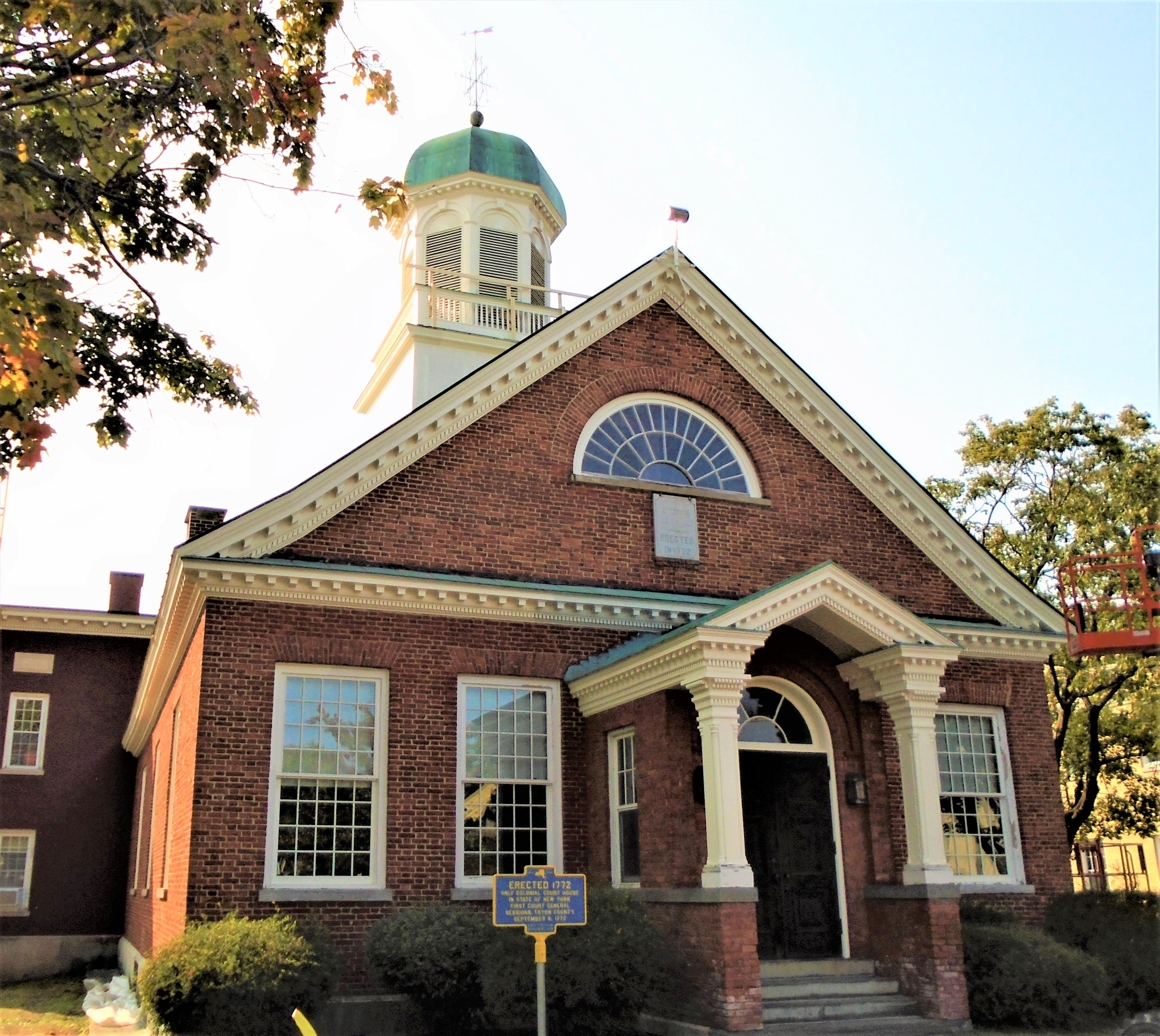
The Fulton County Courthouse, built by Johnson in 1772 as the Tryon County Courthouse, is still used as a courthouse today

As a reward for his services, Johnson received large tracts of land in what are now Hamilton and Fulton counties in New York. Johnson established Johnstown and became one of New York's most prosperous and influential citizens.

Johnson was the largest landowner in the Mohawk Valley, with an estate of more than 400,000 acres (1,600 km^{2}) before his death. Having begun as an Indian trader, Johnson expanded his business interests to include a sawmill and lumber business and a flour mill that served the area. Johnson, the largest enslaver in the county and perhaps in the state of New York, enslaved some 60 Africans to labor for these businesses. He also recruited many Scottish Highlander and Irish tenant farmers to work his lands. Observing Johnson's successful business endeavors, the local Native American inhabitants dubbed him Warragghivage, or "he who does much business."

Johnson founded the village of Johnstown – originally "John's Town" – in 1762, naming it after his son John Johnson. Johnson built a school, which was free but not mandatory, to educate both Mohawk and white children. He was also instrumental in the organization of St. John's Episcopal Church. Johnson, who had been living in what is now known as Old Fort Johnson, also built a large manor house and estate for himself in 1763, Johnson Hall, where he lived until his death. Johnson Hall was designated a National Historic Landmark in 1960. New York State operates it as a historic site.

As the area owned and settled by Johnson grew, he convinced the governor, William Tryon, to establish a new county in upstate New York west of Albany County. This new county was named Tryon, after the governor, and Johnstown became the county seat. The county courthouse, built by William Johnson in Johnstown in 1772, partly at his own expense, still stands today, as the oldest operating courthouse in New York. Sir William Johnson died in 1774 before the American colonies declared their independence from Britain.

=== Revolutionary War and aftermath ===
After the onset of the American Revolutionary War, many British Loyalists, including Johnson's son John and his family, fled Johnstown and the surrounding area for Canada. The state confiscated all of the Johnson property in 1779 because of the family's Loyalist sentiments and support for the British cause. Johnson Hall suffered vandalism at the hands of Continental soldiers quartered there. The house and estate were subsequently sold to Silas Talbot, a naval officer and hero of the American Revolution.

Although most of the fighting during the Revolution occurred elsewhere, Johnstown did see some fighting late in the war. With area residents not knowing of Cornwallis' defeat and surrender at the Battle of Yorktown in Virginia, about 1,400 soldiers fought at the Battle of Johnstown, one of the last battles of the Revolution, on October 25, 1781. The Continental forces, led by Col. Marinus Willett of Fort Johnstown, ultimately put the British to flight after they had burned large tracts of land in the Mohawk Valley.

After the war, Johnstown became part of Montgomery County when Tryon County was renamed to honor the Continental General Richard Montgomery, who died at the Battle of Quebec.

=== 19th century to the present ===
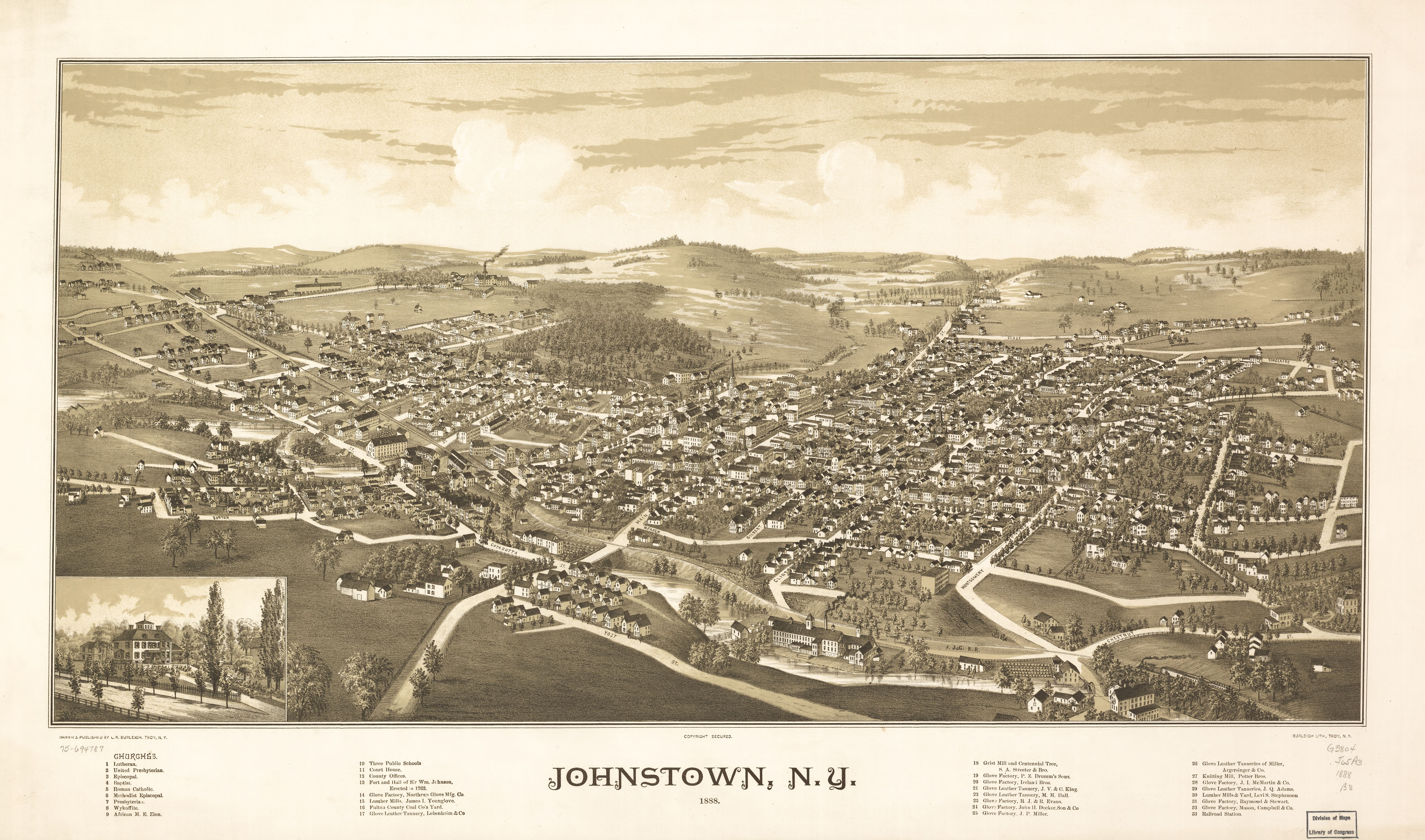
Perspective map of Johnstown from 1888 by L.R. Burleigh with list of landmarks

In 1803, the community of Johnstown was incorporated as a village. In 1838, Johnstown's county affiliation changed yet again when what by then remained of Montgomery County was divided into two separate counties: Montgomery and Fulton. While the village of Fonda became the new county seat of Montgomery County, Johnstown became the county seat of Fulton County. The village of Johnstown became a city in 1895, becoming separate from the surrounding town.

Elizabeth Cady Stanton, who became a prominent activist for women's rights, was born in Johnstown in 1815 and was educated at the Johnstown Academy.

In 1889, Johnstown suffered a devastating flood. The Cayadutta Creek rampaged, Schreiber's Skin Mill was swept away, as was the State Street bridge, and over twenty people were drowned or missing when the flood carried away the Perry Street bridge.

In 1906, the state of New York bought Johnson Hall from its private owners in order to renovate and preserve it.

==== Industrialization ====
With plentiful forests of hemlock trees and the wood bark they produced, Johnstown became a center for tanning of leather during the late 19th century. By the early 20th century, Johnstown, along with neighboring Gloversville, became known as the glove-making capital of the world, nicknamed the "Glove Cities". Many related businesses once existed to support the glove and leather industries around Johnstown. Box manufacturers, thread dealers, sewing machine repairers, chemical companies, and many others made a living helping to supply and service the industry.

One of the other early industries established in Johnstown was the Knox gelatine plant. It was built in 1890 by Charles B. Knox, a prominent Johnstown resident, who developed the granulated, unflavored gelatin still used in food preparation today. When Knox died in 1908, his wife Rose Knox managed the business. She became one of the earliest successful American businesswomen. The Knox family and its philanthropic foundation were generous to the city, giving it the block of land known as Knox Field, where playgrounds, athletic fields, and bridle paths are located. The city named Knox Junior High School for the family. The Knox Gelatin plant, once a major employer in Johnstown, closed in 1975 following the sale of the company to the Lipton Tea Company.

== Geography ==
Johnstown is located along the southern edge of Fulton County, in the picturesque Mohawk Valley of upstate New York. It is slightly north of the route developed for the Erie Canal through what is now Montgomery County. Although not a hilltown, Johnstown is close to the Adirondack Mountains that stretch across the northern portion of Fulton County. It is near the southern border of the Adirondack Park.

According to the United States Census Bureau, the city has a total area of 4.88 square miles (12.65 km^{2}), of which 4.88 square miles (12.63 km^{2}) is land and 0.01 square miles (0.02 km^{2}), or 0.17%, is water. The city is bordered to the north, east, and west by the town of Johnstown, to the northeast by the city of Gloversville, and to the south by the town of Mohawk in Montgomery County.

Cayadutta Creek, which runs through the city, provided water power needed to generate the electricity required by the various industries that grew up in Johnstown. The creek flows south to join the Mohawk River at Fonda.

East-west highways, New York State Route 29 and New York State Route 67, intersect in the city and also cross the north-south highway New York State Route 30A. NY 29 leads east 32 miles (51 km) to Saratoga Springs and northwest 8 miles (13 km) to Rockwood. NY 67 leads southeast 11 miles (18 km) to Amsterdam and west 18 miles (29 km) to St. Johnsville. NY 30A leads northeast 4 miles (6 km) to Gloversville and 10 miles (16 km) to Mayfield, as well as south 4.5 miles (7.2 km) to Fonda and 6 miles (10 km) to the New York Thruway.

== Demographics ==
Historical population
Census	Pop.	Note	%±
1870	3,282		—
1880	5,013		52.7%
1890	7,768		55.0%
1900	10,130		30.4%
1910	10,447		3.1%
1920	10,908		4.4%
1930	10,801		−1.0%
1940	10,666		−1.2%
1950	10,923		2.4%
1960	10,390		−4.9%
1970	10,045		−3.3%
1980	9,360		−6.8%
1990	9,058		−3.2%
2000	8,511		−6.0%
2010	8,743		2.7%
2020	8,204		−6.2%
U.S. Decennial Census

=== 2020 census ===
As of the 2020 census, Johnstown had a population of 8,204. The median age was 42.8 years. 19.8% of residents were under the age of 18 and 21.1% of residents were 65 years of age or older. For every 100 females there were 90.0 males, and for every 100 females age 18 and over there were 86.9 males age 18 and over.

98.6% of residents lived in urban areas, while 1.4% lived in rural areas.

There were 3,650 households in Johnstown, of which 25.2% had children under the age of 18 living in them. Of all households, 34.6% were married-couple households, 20.9% were households with a male householder and no spouse or partner present, and 33.5% were households with a female householder and no spouse or partner present. About 37.9% of all households were made up of individuals and 17.8% had someone living alone who was 65 years of age or older.

There were 4,100 housing units, of which 11.0% were vacant. The homeowner vacancy rate was 2.2% and the rental vacancy rate was 6.1%.

Racial composition as of the 2020 census
Race	Number	Percent
White	7,399	90.2%
Black or African American	91	1.1%
American Indian and Alaska Native	17	0.2%
Asian	98	1.2%
Native Hawaiian and Other Pacific Islander	0	0.0%
Some other race	108	1.3%
Two or more races	491	6.0%
Hispanic or Latino (of any race)	345	4.2%

=== 2000 census ===
As of the census of 2000, there were 8,511 people, 3,579 households, 2,208 families residing in the city. The population density was 1,751.1 inhabitants per square mile (676.1/km^{2}). There were 3,979 housing units at an average density of 818.7 per square mile (316.1/km^{2}). The racial makeup of the city was 96.6% White, 0.6% Black or African American, 0.3% Native American, 1.0% Asian, <0.1% Pacific Islander, 0.4% from other races, and 1.1% from two or more races. Hispanic or Latino of any race were 1.1% of the population.

There were 3,579 households, out of which 29.5% had children under the age of 18 living with them, 44.1% were married couples living together, 13.5% had a female householder with no husband present, and 38.3% were non-families. 33.3% of all households were made up of individuals, and 16.6% had someone living alone who was 65 years of age or older. The average household size was 2.30 and the average family size was 2.91.

In the city, the population was spread out, with 24.4% under the age of 18, 7.2% from 18 to 24, 27.6% from 25 to 44, 21.6% from 45 to 64, and 19.2% who were 65 years of age or older. The median age was 39 years. For every 100 females, there were 87.8 males. For every 100 females age 18 and over, there were 82.8 males.

The median income for a household in the city was $32,603, and the median income for a family was $39,909. Males had a median income of $30,636 versus $22,272 for females. The per capita income for the city was $17,324. About 9.3% of families and 13.2% of the population were below the poverty line, including 19.5% of those under age 18 and 8.2% of those age 65 or over.

== Notable people ==
=== Enos Throop ===
Enos Throop, governor of New York from 1829 to 1832, was born in Johnstown.

=== Silas Talbot ===
Silas Talbot moved with his family to Johnstown, where he purchased Sir William Johnson's estate and manor house. A hero of the American Revolution, he later served as a member of the New York Assembly (1792–1793) and as a congressman in the U.S. House of Representatives (1793–1794) from that district.

In 1797 he supervised the building of the USS Constitution ("Old Iron Sides") at the Charlestown Navy Yard in Boston, Massachusetts. Talbot commanded the USS Constitution, largely in the West Indies, from 1799 to 1801, when he retired from the U.S. Navy.

=== Daniel Cady ===
One of the men who shaped Fulton County was Judge Daniel Cady, a prominent Johnstown resident. Sometimes called "the father of Fulton County", Cady named the new county after Robert Fulton, who was related by marriage to Cady's wife, Margaret Livingston. Robert Fulton, an inventor, is perhaps best known for devising the improvements that made steamboats commercially viable.

Judge Daniel Cady was one of Johnstown's most important citizens. With indirect connections by marriage to John Jacob Astor and that family's lucrative fur business interests, Daniel Cady, adept at managing these connections and his own business interests, joined the ranks of the wealthiest landowners in New York. After moving to Johnstown in 1799, he married Margaret Livingston, whose father, Col. James Livingston, fought in the Continental Army at the battles of Quebec and Saratoga during the American Revolution. Col. Livingston frustrated Benedict Arnold's attempted treason by firing on The Vulture, the boat intended to carry Arnold to safety. A public servant as well as an astute lawyer and businessman, Judge Cady served in the New York state legislature from 1808 until 1814. In 1814 he was elected as a Federalist to one term in the United States House of Representatives. In 1816, he returned to Johnstown from Washington and resumed legal practice. He later served as a judge on the New York Supreme Court, Fourth District, from 1847 until 1855. Cady died in Johnstown in 1859 and is buried in the cemetery there.

=== John D. McDonald ===
John D. McDonald (1816–1900) was born in Johnstown. Orphaned at 12, he took off for the Wisconsin Territory at age 20, where he was a farmer (lived on the same farm for 63 years) and served in the Wisconsin State Assembly and in various local offices.

=== Israel T. Hatch ===
Hatch was born in Johnstown. He became mayor of Buffalo, New York and a U.S. House of Representatives member. He was a law partner with Henry K. Smith, who also became a mayor of Buffalo.

=== Elizabeth Cady Stanton ===
Daniel Cady is today perhaps best known as the father of the prominent women's rights activist Elizabeth Cady Stanton, who was born in Johnstown in 1815. Stanton, who later worked in partnership with Susan B. Anthony and served for many years as president of the National Woman Suffrage Association (NWSA), spent her childhood in Johnstown, where she studied at the Johnstown Academy. It was one of the first schools in New York to receive a teaching certificate issued by the newly formed state education system in the later 19th century. After leaving to continue her education in Troy, New York, Stanton returned to Johnstown with her husband Henry Brewster Stanton, a lawyer and abolitionist who studied law under her father, Daniel Cady. Because of her role, Johnstown, together with Seneca Falls, New York, where Elizabeth Cady Stanton helped organize the first Women's Rights Convention held in 1848, lays claim to being the birthplace of the women's rights movement in the United States. Stanton's speech, the Declaration of Sentiments, given at the Seneca Falls convention and modeled on the Declaration of Independence, is generally credited with instigating the women's suffrage movement in the United States.

=== George Linius Streeter ===
George Linius Streeter was a noted embryologist and Director of the Carnegie Institution of Washington. Son of George Austin Streeter, a glove-maker.

== Gallery ==
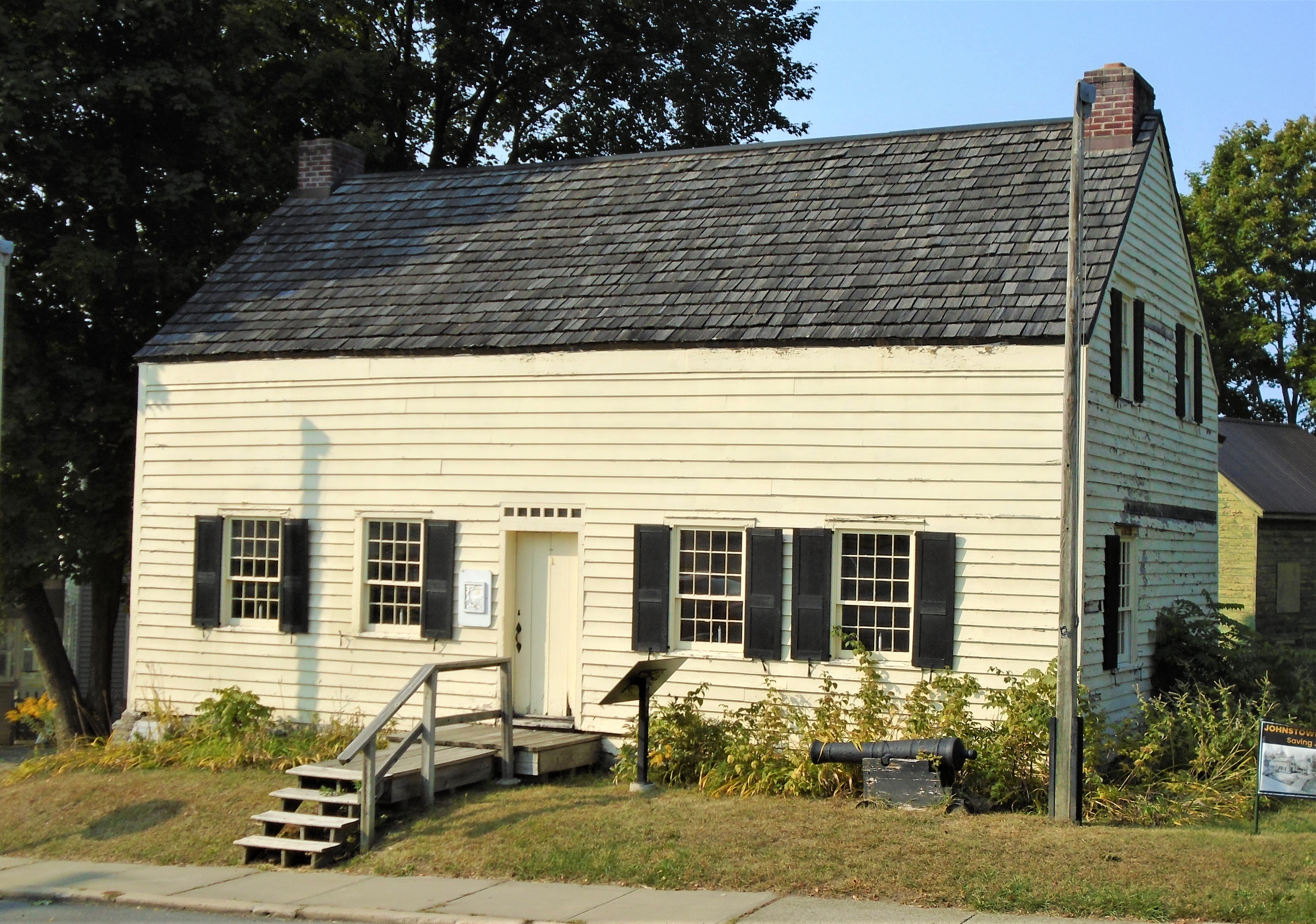
The Drumm House is one of six cottages built by Sir William Johnson c.1763 to house the tenant farmers he brought to the New World to become soldiers

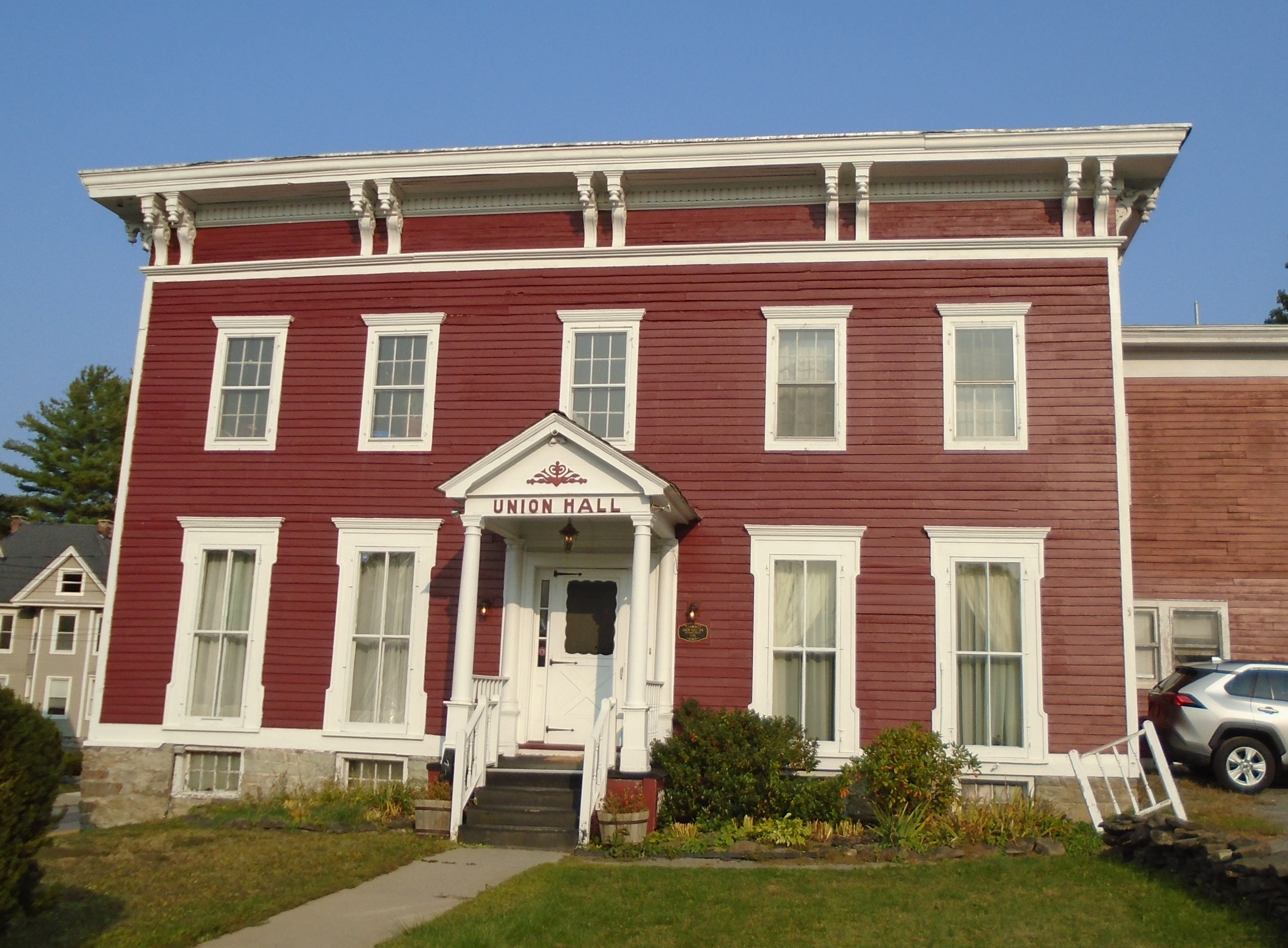
Union Hall, a well-known tavern in the post-Revolutionary War period, was built in 1798

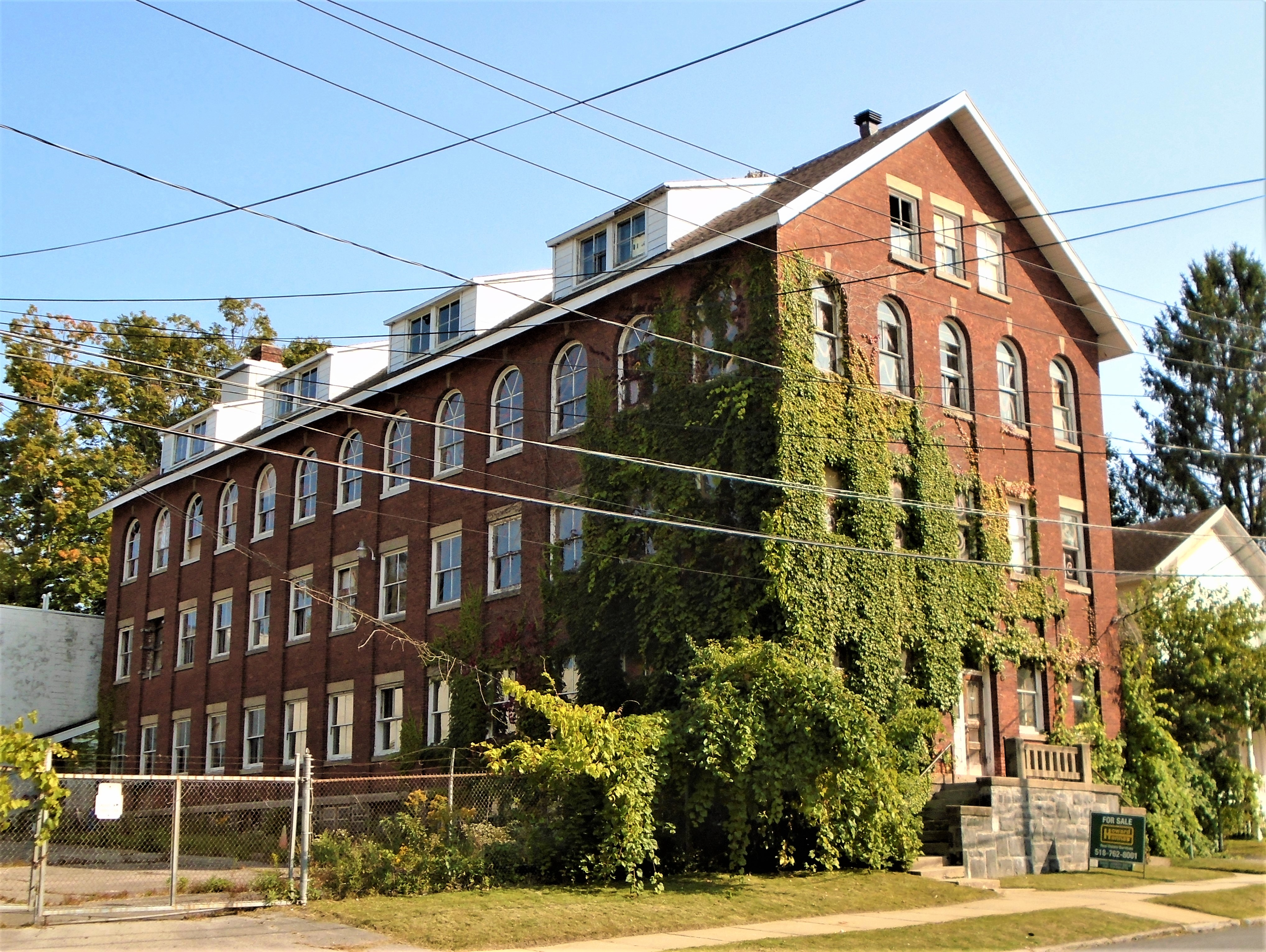
Built in 1798 as Johnstown Academy, this building was converted into a glove-making factory in 1886.

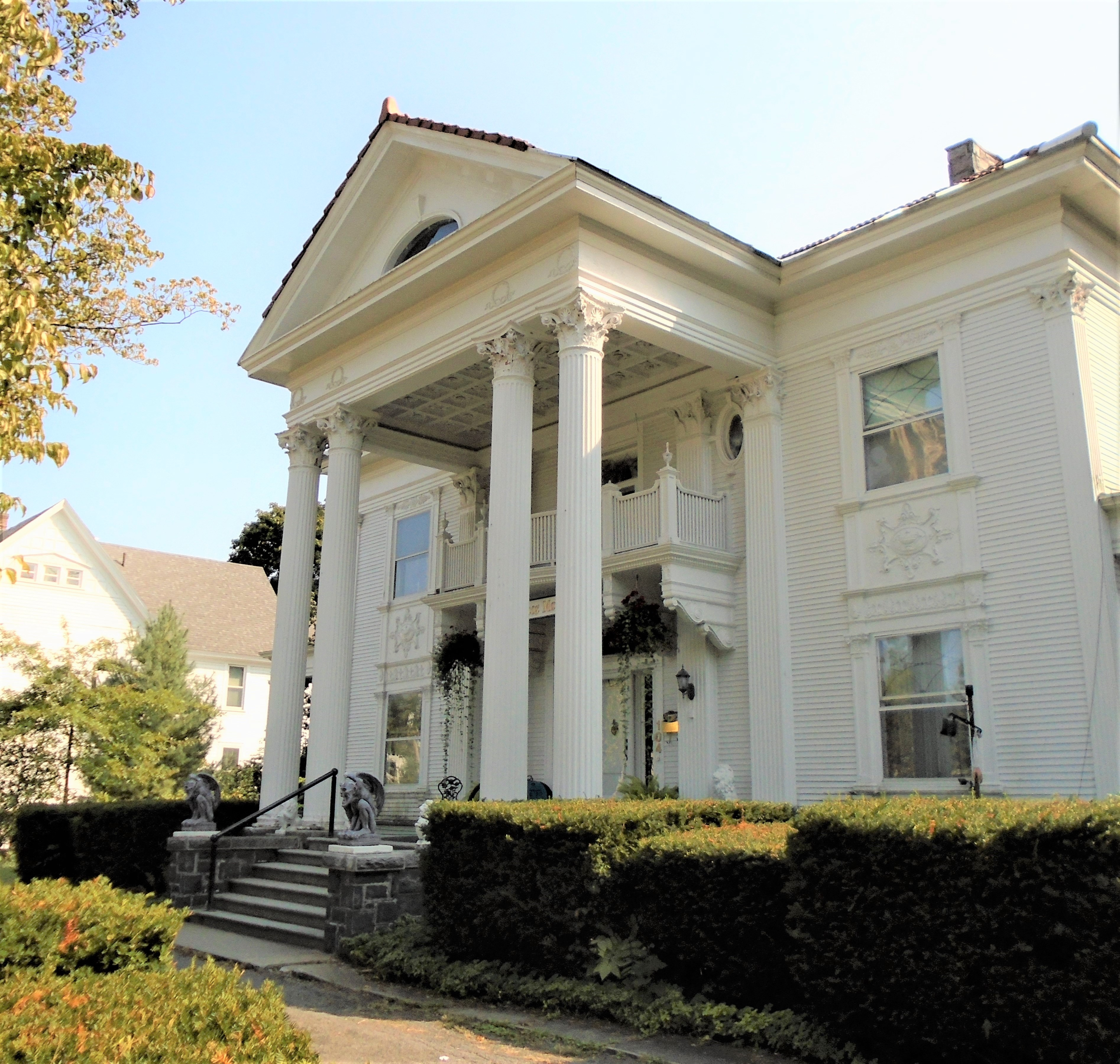
The Knox Mansion was built in 1889 by Knox gelatin magnate Charles Knox. It is listed on the National Register of Historic Places (NRHP)

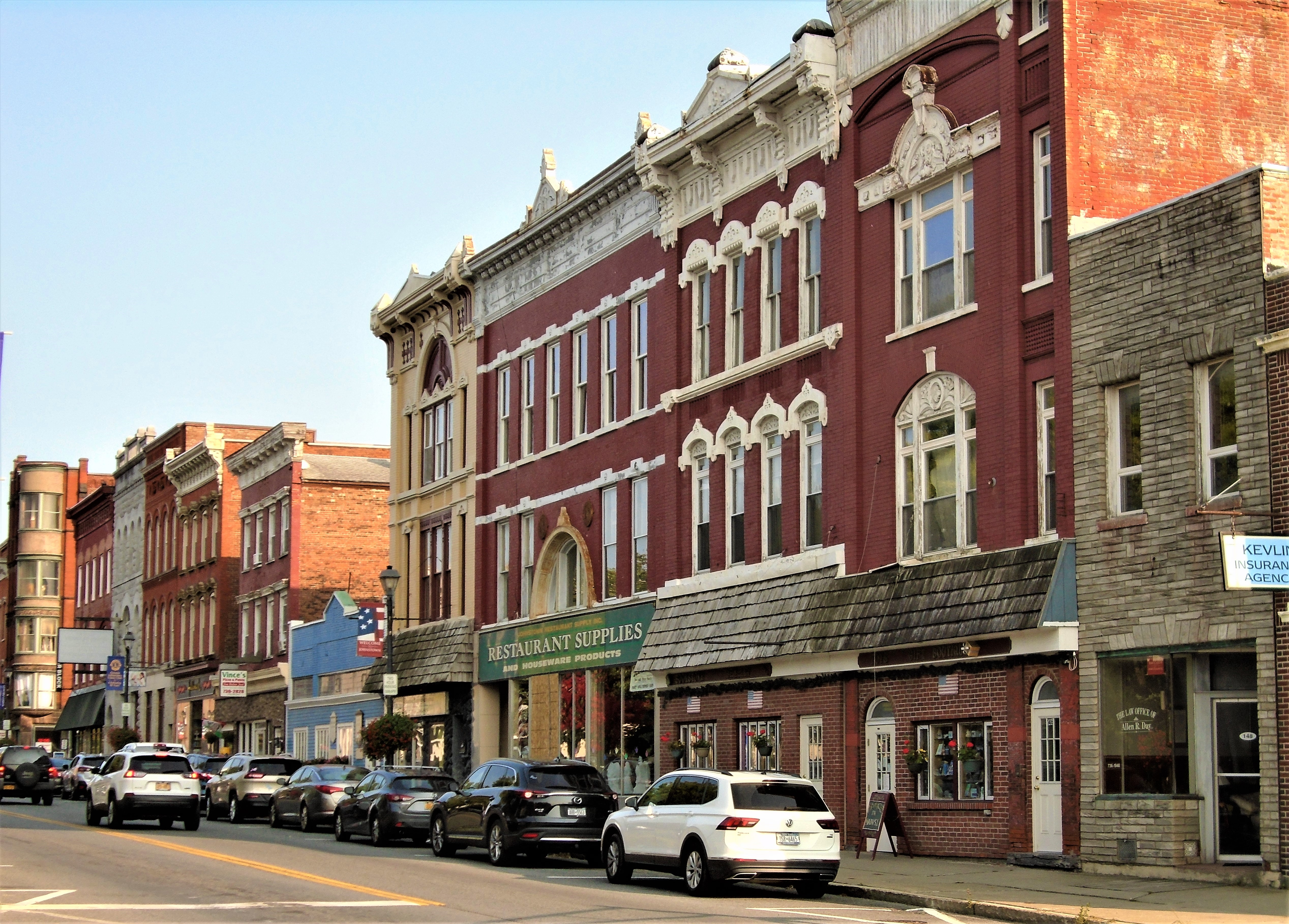
A block of West Main Street in downtown Johnstown
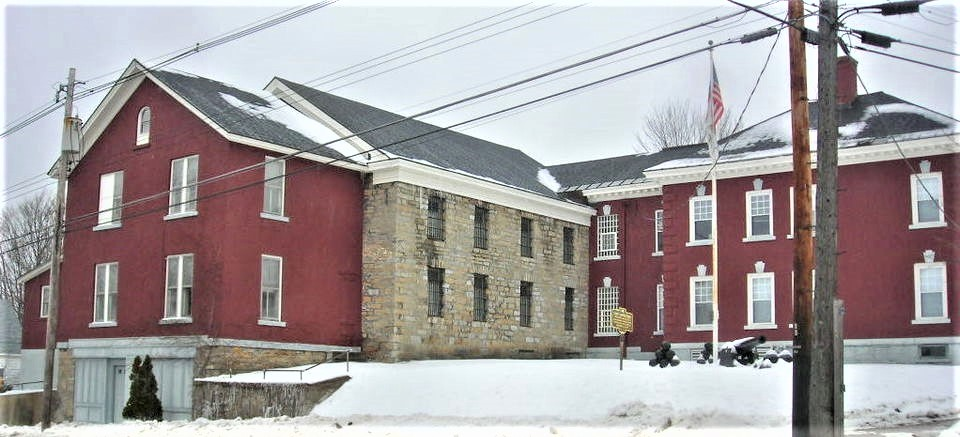
The Fulton County Jail, built in 1773 and expanded c.1806, became Fort Johnstown and was the headquarters of American militiamen who fought in the Battle of Johnstown in the American Revolutionary War. (NRHP)

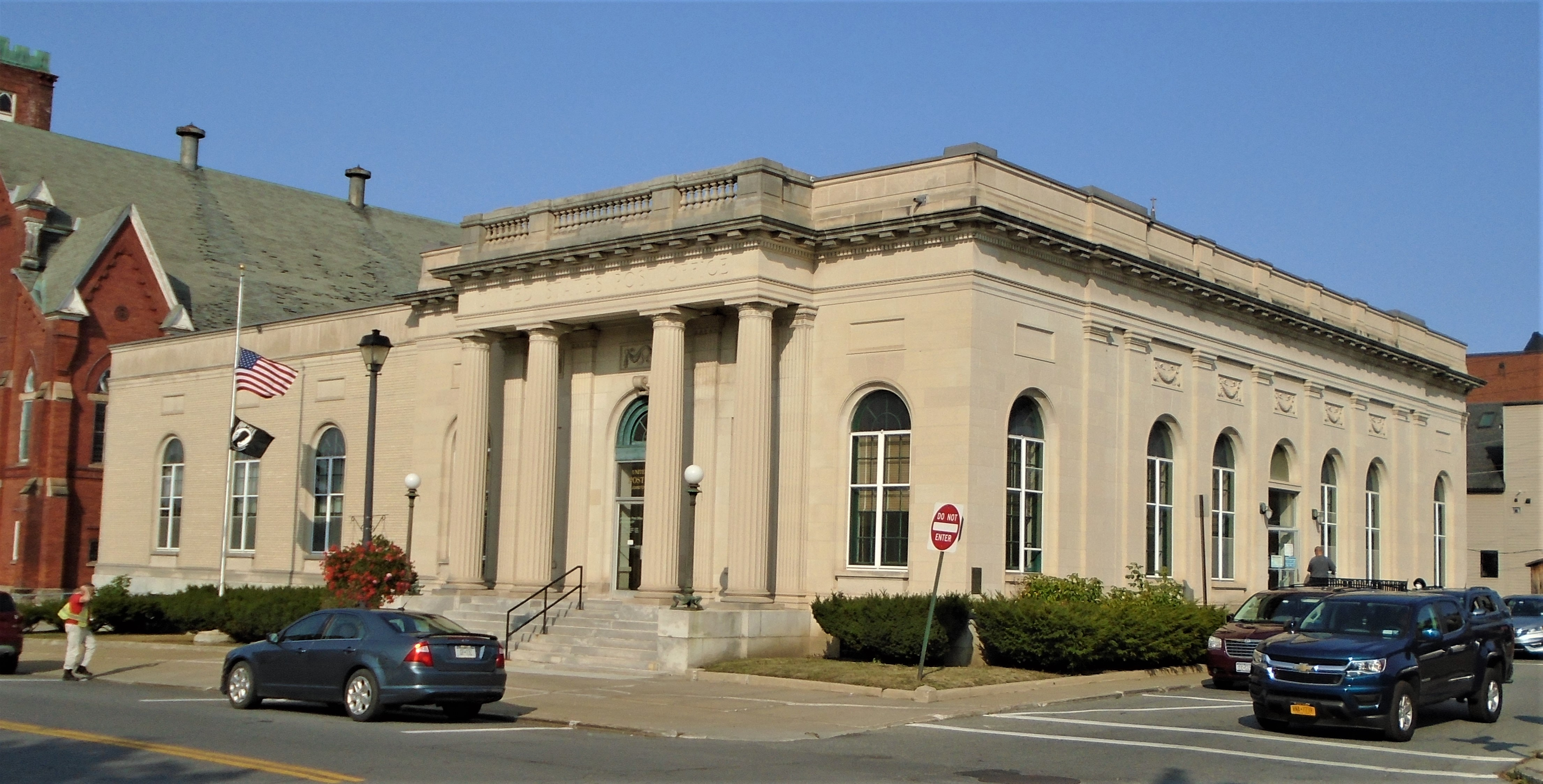
The U.S. Post Office in Johnstown was built in 1913 (NRHP)
