= Pine Lake (Fulton County, New York) =

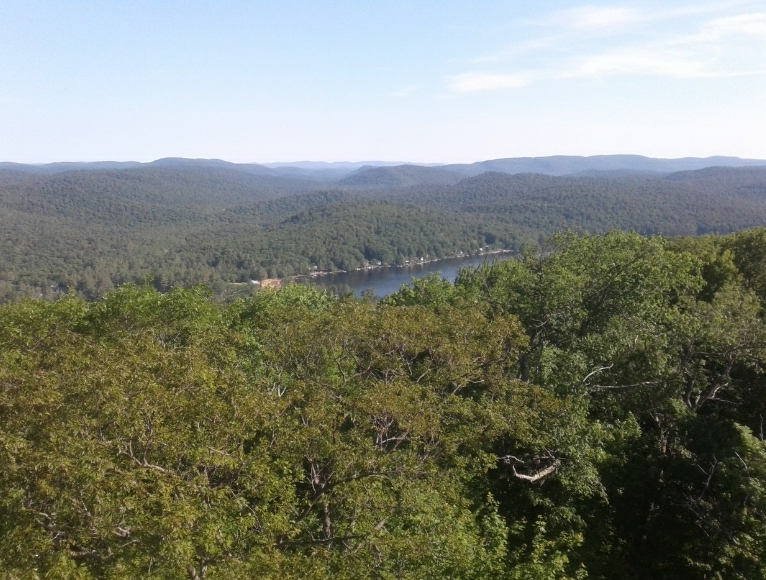
- Partial view of Pine Lake from top of Kane Mountain June 2019.

- Location within New York Pine Lake (the United States)
- Location: Fulton County, New York, United States
- Coordinates: 43°11′50″N 74°30′46″W
- Type: Reservoir
- Basin countries: United States
- Surface area: 166 acres (0.67 km^{2})
- Surface elevation: 1,565 feet (477 m)
- Settlements: Caroga Lake, New York

Pine Lake is a reservoir in Fulton County in the U.S. State of New York. It is located in the Town of Caroga north of the Hamlet of Canada Lake. Kane Mountain is located south and Pine Mountain is located east of Pine Lake.
