= Camelhump =

Mountain in Fulton County, New York

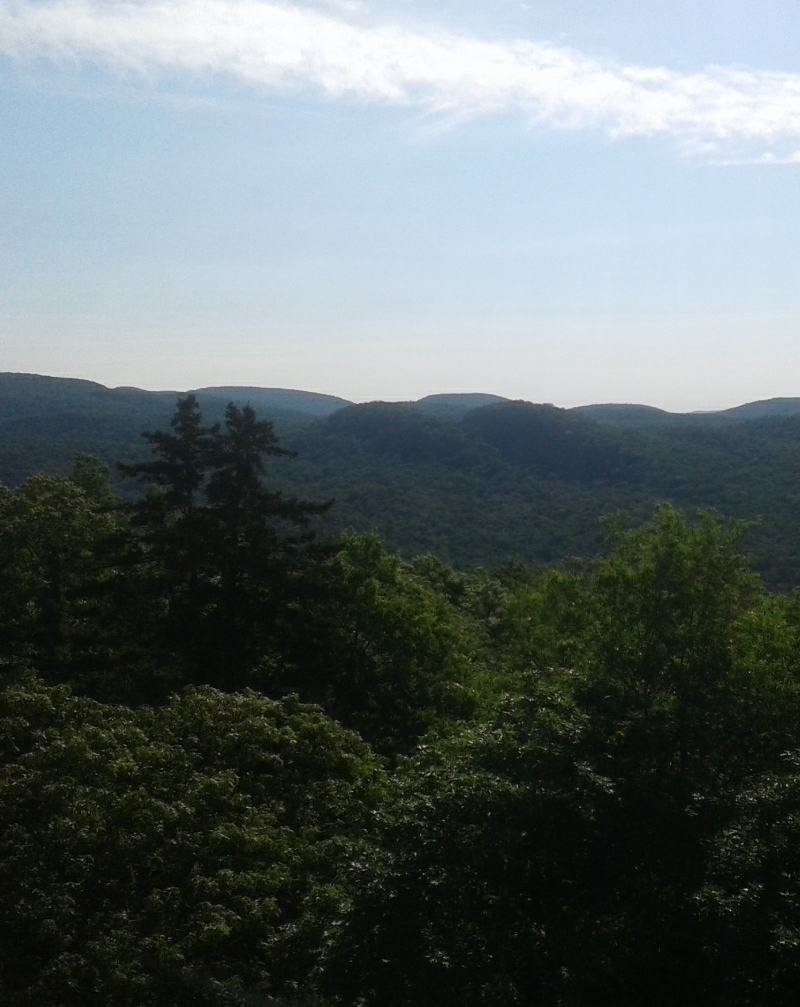
- View of Camelhump (two closest humps right of pine trees) from Kane Mountain

Highest point
- Elevation: 2,192 feet (668 m)
- Coordinates: 43°11′06″N 74°29′22″W

Geography
- Location within New York Adirondack Park Location within the United States
- Location: NNW of Caroga Lake, New York, U.S.
- Topo map: USGS Caroga Lake

Camelhump is a mountain in the Adirondack Mountains region of New York. It is located north-northwest of the Hamlet of Caroga Lake. Kane Mountain is located west, Canada Lake is located southwest and Stewart Lake is located east of Camelhump.
