= Sprite Creek =

River in the U.S. State of New York

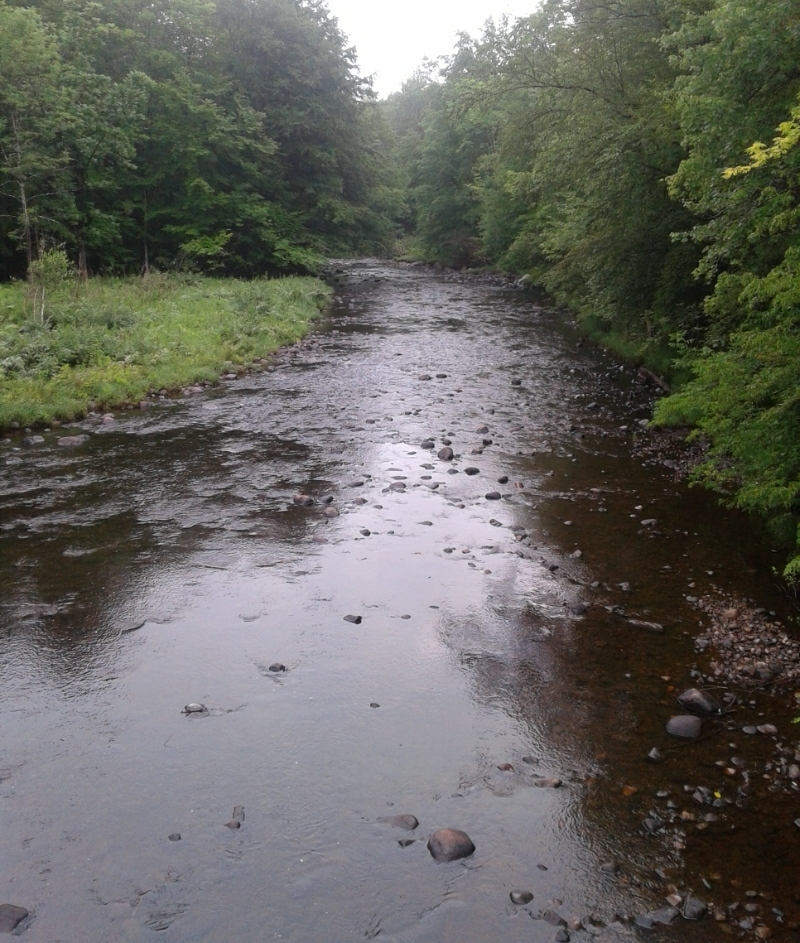
- Sprite Creek upstream of Vorhees Road

- Location of the mouth of Sprite Creek Sprite Creek (the United States)

Location
- Country: United States
- State: New York
- Regions: Adirondacks, Central New York Region
- Counties: Fulton, Herkimer
- Towns: Caroga, Stratford, Oppenheim

Physical characteristics
- Source: Canada Lake
  - location: NW of Caroga Lake
  - coordinates: 43°09′51″N 74°32′24″W
  - elevation: 1,549 ft (472 m)
- Mouth: East Canada Creek
  - location: NE of Dolgeville
  - coordinates: 43°07′41″N 74°43′45″W
  - elevation: 902 ft (275 m)
- Length: 12.1 mi (19.5 km)
- Basin size: 10.1 mi^{2} (26 km^{2})

Sprite Creek is a river in Fulton County and Herkimer County in the U.S. State of New York. It begins at Canada Lake northwest of the Hamlet of Caroga Lake, and flows through Lily Lake before converging with the East Canada Creek northeast of the Village of Dolgeville.
