= Peck Creek =

Creek in New York State

Location
- Country: United States
- State: New York

Physical characteristics
- Source: Peck Lake
  - location: Caroga Lake, New York
- Mouth: Caroga Creek
  - location: Northbush, New York
  - coordinates: 43°04′31″N 74°29′28″W
  - elevation: 1,106 ft (337 m)
- Basin size: 22.5 mi^{2} (58 km^{2})

Peck Creek flows into the Caroga Creek near Northbush, New York.
