= Kane Mountain =

Mountain in Fulton County, New York

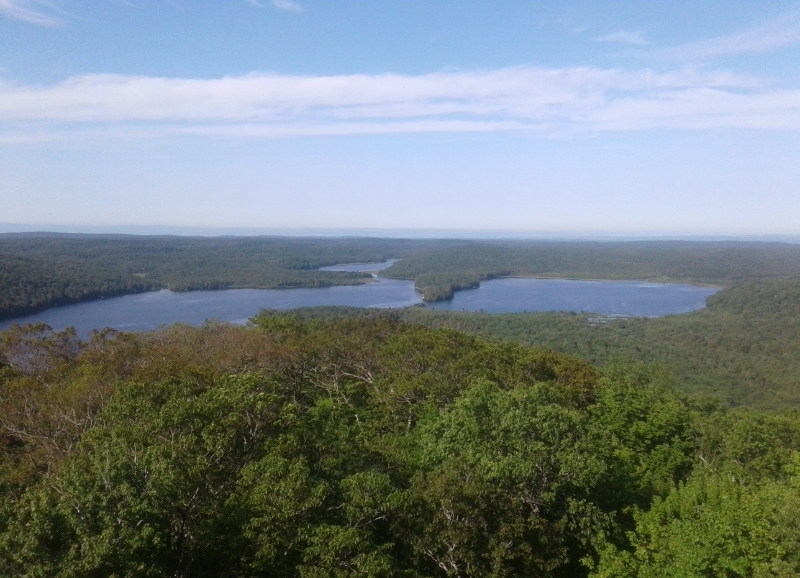
- View of Canada Lake, West Lake and Lily Lake from fire observation station

Highest point
- Elevation: 2,185 feet (666 m)
- Prominence: 460 ft (140 m)
- Coordinates: 43°10′51″N 74°30′56″W

Geography
- Location within New York Adirondack Park Location within the United States
- Location: N of Canada Lake, New York, U.S.
- Topo map: USGS Canada Lake

Kane Mountain is a mountain in the Adirondack Mountains region of New York. It is located north of the Hamlet of Canada Lake. The Kane Mountain Fire Observation Station is located on top of the mountain. Sheeley Mountain is located south-southwest, Canada Lake is located south, Camelhump is located east and Pine Lake is located north of Kane Mountain.

== Kane Mountain Fire Observation Station ==
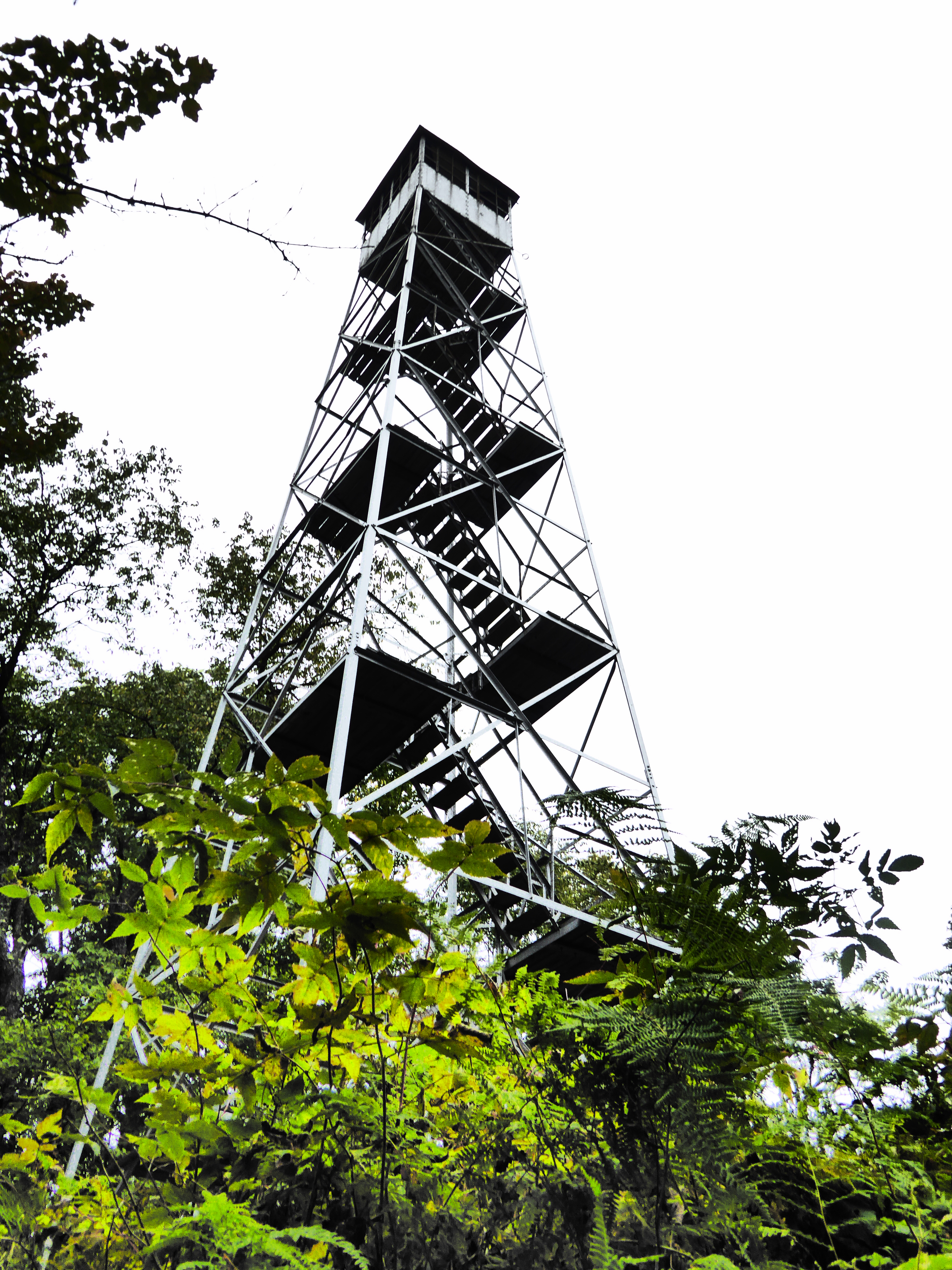
Kane Mountain Fire Observation Station

The Kane Mountain Fire Observation Station is a historic fire observation station located on Kane Mountain at Caroga in Fulton County, New York. The station includes a 60-foot-tall (18 m), steel-frame lookout tower erected in 1925, an observer's cabin built about 1960, and foot trail. The tower and trail are contributing resources. The tower is a prefabricated structure built by the Aermotor Corporation and provided a front line of defense in preserving the Adirondack Forest Preserve from the hazards of forest fires. There was previously a south trail that lead from Schoolhouse Road to the summit. This trail was closed because it crossed private lands and the landowner revoked permission in 2018.

== Routes ==
The summit can be accessed via two separate foot trails. The main trail (red trail) runs from Green Lake Road and is a 0.6 miles (0.97 km) mile hike that climbs 600 feet (180 m) to the top of the mountain. This trail is moderate in difficulty. The second trail (yellow trail) runs from Green Lake Road as well and is a 1.2 miles (1.9 km) hike. This trail can also be accessed from the Pine Lake Campground. Close to the Green Lake Road parking lot another trail branches off towards Stewart Lake and Indian Lake. This trail is a 2.3 miles (3.7 km) hike that leads to the lakes. At each lake there are primitive campsites.
