= Killing of Dhal Apet and Lueth Mo =

2023 police shooting of two teens in DeWitt, New York

- Date: September 6, 2023; 3 years ago
- Location: DeWitt, New York, U.S.
- Type: Homicide by shooting, police killing
- Filmed by: Surveillance video
- Participants: John Rosello (shooter)
- Deaths: Dhal Apet, 17; Lueth Mo, 15

On September 6, 2023, Dhal Apet, 17, and Lueth Mo, 15, were fatally shot by John Rosello, 34, a deputy sheriff employed by the Onondaga County Sheriff's Office in DeWitt, New York. Deputy Rosello was responding to reports related to car thefts and the burglary of a local smoke shop when he encountered Apet, Mo, and Javon Cambers (the third suspect who fled the scene) in a mobile home park. Rosello confronted the teens with his handgun drawn, at which point they attempted to elude the deputy in their stolen car, which caused Rosello to open fire, believing he was in danger of being struck by the car.

== People involved ==
=== Dhal Apet ===
Dhal Apet was a 17-year-old Black American from Syracuse, New York, and the son of two South Sudanese refugees. Apet was a senior at Henninger High School at the time of his death. According to his obituary, Apet is survived by his parents Pothwei Bangoshoth and Hawa Ayek. Apet is also survived by his 11 siblings; Amgad Mohamed, Dut Apet, Deng Apet, Jalau Apet, Abiriu Apet, Nyibol Apet, Ajak Apet, Adut Bangoshoth, Jouliana Apet, Makor Apet and Victoria Apet.

=== Lueth Mo ===
Lueth Mo was a 15-year-old Black American from Syracuse and the son of two South Sudanese refugees. Mo was a sophomore at Henninger High School at the time of his death. According to his obituary Mo is survived by his parents Domkog Mo and Monika Marial. He is also survived by his 6 older siblings; David Mo, Chol Mo, Adut Mo, Amok Mo, Anyang Mo, and Athoil Mo.

=== John Rosello ===
John Rosello is a 34-year-old White American. Rosello is from Cazenovia, New York, a town within Madison County. Rosello has been a deputy sheriff for Onondaga County since 2016. At the time of the incident Rosello had not previously been involved in any police shootings as a deputy. According to an article written 15 days after the incident, Rosello returned to work after being on paid leave for a period which extended the mandatory 72 hours. Rosello returned to work on modified duty, meaning he was not armed or in uniform. Rosello was also not placed back on patrol on returning back to work.

=== Javon Camber ===
Javon Camber is a 17-year-old Black American from Syracuse. Camber was arrested in Rochester after being found in possession of a stolen car, and was charged with stolen property. According to the Onondaga County Sheriff’s office, Camber was the alleged driver involved in the incident which resulted in the deaths of Dhal Apet and Lueth Mo. As of January 29, 2024, Camber has not been charged with in connection to the incident.

== Incident ==
At approximately 9 p.m. on September 5, 2023, two cars, a Kia and a Hyundai, were stolen in Syracuse and involved in the burglary of two smoke shops in the Syracuse area, one in Oneida and another in DeWitt. The next morning, a 911 caller reported seeing individuals moving items from one vehicle to another in an empty lot in a mobile home park in DeWitt. Deputy John Rosello, a deputy who was investigating one of the smoke shop burglaries, responded to the call as the description of the vehicles matched the description of those used in the burglaries.

In a video captured on nearby security cameras, Rosello is seen responding to the call. In the video Rosello drives towards the vehicles, impacting the front of a white Hyundai head on, Rosello then gets out of his patrol car and approaches the car. A black SUV seen in the video drives off. Apet, Mo, and a third individual attempted to drive off in the Hyundai, after being pinned up against bushes. The car is seen backing up while Rosello had his gun drawn, then the car moved forward which is when Rosello fired his service pistol three times, striking Apet and Mo. The car continued driving for more than a mile, a total of 1.6 kilometers, before stopping on Syracuse Street, where Apet and Mo were found, one dead, and one dying. Rosello’s body camera was not turned on during the time of the incident.

== Aftermath ==
Immediately after the shooting the Onondaga County Sheriff's Office claimed that the teens attempted to run over Deputy Rosello, and that he had opened fire in self-defense. Sheriff Tobias Shelley claimed that Rosello was caught between the vehicle and a heavy workbench and that Rosello "had nowhere to flee to." He was placed on a mandatory 72-hour paid administrative leave following the fatal shooting.

The New York State Attorney General Office of Special Investigation is conducting an investigation into the incident, which is standard procedure for officer-involved killings in the state of New York. Footage released by the Attorney General Letitia James' Office on September 12, 2023, depicts the shooting from a security camera on a nearby home. The New York Times reported that, "the narrative [of Deputy Rosello] was punctured, in part" by the release of the footage.

On September 28, the families of the deceased filed a notice of intent to sue the Sheriff's Office. In December, the estates of Apet and Mo filed separate lawsuits against Onondaga County. The suits each sought $36 million from the county and claimed that Deputy Rosello had violated the victims’ constitutional rights with his use of excessive force. Domkog Mo, the father of Lueth, filed a lawsuit against the Sheriff’s Office, Deputy Rosello, and Sheriff Toby Shelley; Apet’s estate filed a lawsuit against Onondaga County.

After Camber’s arrest, his mother, Lacey Wright, filed a notice of claim to begin the process of suing Deputy Rosello for allegedly giving her and her son Post-traumatic stress disorder. Wright dropped the claim on February 9, 2024.

=== Funeral ===
On September 16, 2023, the families of Dhal Apet and Lueth Mo held a double funeral at Vincent De Paul Roman Catholic Church in Syracuse’s north side. The funeral was held at 10:00 a.m. following the calling hours which were held from 8:00 a.m. to 9:45 a.m. More than 400 people attended the funeral of Apet and Mo. According to an article by Syracuse.com (The Post Standard), Dinka funeral hymns were played, the sisters of Mo and Apet eulogized them, and there was no mention of the shooting or what was at the time an ongoing investigation.

=== Protests ===
On Thursday September 14, 2023, activists, community members, and family and friends of the victims organized a protest at the Onondaga County Sheriff’s Office on South State Street in Syracuse. Estimates on the number of protestors range from around 20 to 40. Demonstrators held signs of victims of police brutality from other parts of the country. While some attempted to enter government buildings including the Sheriff’s Office and county courthouse, but none succeeded. The protest dispersed peacefully around 3:20 p.m.

=== Media coverage ===
In addition to extensive local coverage, the deaths of the two teens was covered in a New York Times article written by Jesse McKinley, a Metro correspondent with an emphasis on Upstate New York. The article written by the Times, a paper with a national audience, points to the incidents connection to the national issue of police brutality. The article detailed the events of the incident, as well as a look at the impact their deaths had on the South Sudanese community to which Apet and Mo belonged. The piece contains interviews with Syracuse Common Council member Chol Majok, local activist Walt Dixie, president of the Syracuse Chapter of the National Action Network H. Bernard Alex, Apet’s father Pothwei Bangoshoth, funeral attendees, and other members of the community.

== See also ==
- Killing of Eddie Irizarry
- Murder of George Floyd
- List of killings by law enforcement officers in the United States, September 2023
