= Lily Lake (New York) =

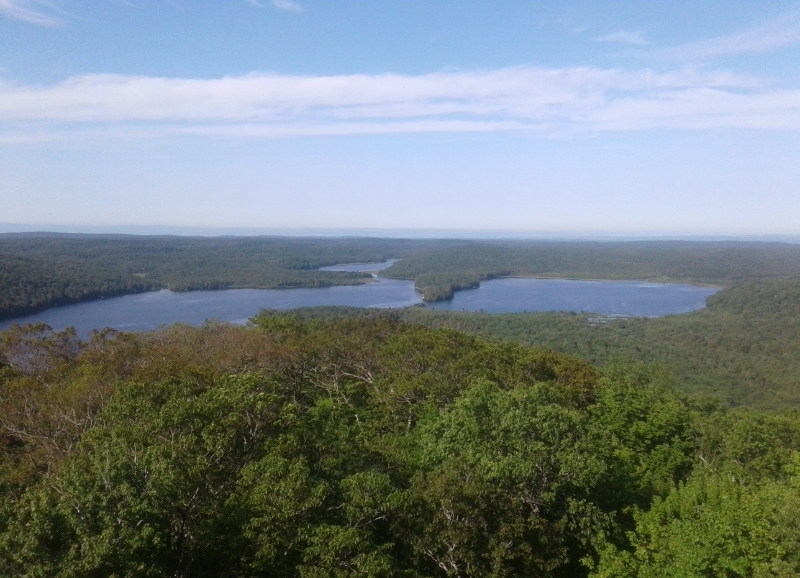
- View of Lily Lake (top), west end of Canada Lake (lower left) and West Lake (lower right) from top of Kane Mountain. Dolgeville Point separates West and Canada Lakes.

- Location within New York Lily Lake (the United States)
- Location: Fulton County, New York, United States
- Coordinates: 43°09′27″N 74°32′41″W
- Type: Lake
- Primary inflows: Sprite Creek
- Primary outflows: Sprite Creek
- Basin countries: United States
- Surface area: 42 acres (0.17 km^{2})
- Average depth: 8 feet (2.4 m)
- Max. depth: 23 feet (7.0 m)
- Shore length^{1}: 1.7 miles (2.7 km)
- Surface elevation: 1,549 feet (472 m)
- Settlements: Canada Lake (hamlet)
- ^{1} Shore length is not a well-defined measure.

Lily Lake is located in Fulton County in the U.S. state of New York. It is located southwest of the hamlet of Canada Lake. Fish species present in the lake are northern pike, largemouth bass, black bullhead, rock bass, yellow perch, and pumpkinseed sunfish. There is access via Sprite Creek from Canada Lake.
