= List of killings by law enforcement officers in the United States, August 2023 =

This is a list of people reported killed by non-military law enforcement officers in the United States in August 2023, whether in the line of duty or not, and regardless of reason or method. The listing documents the occurrence of a death, making no implications regarding wrongdoing or justification on the part of the person killed or officer involved. Killings are arranged by date of the incident that caused death. Different death dates, if known, are noted in the description. The table below lists 116 people.

== August 2023 ==
| Date | Name (age) of deceased | Race | Location | Description |
|---|---|---|---|---|
| 2023-08-31 | Richard Jess Ramirez (29) | Unknown | Casa Grande, Arizona | Shot by Casa Grande police during a domestic dispute call. The man was allegedly armed with a knife. The shooting caused McCartney Ranch Elementary to go on lockdown. |
| 2023-08-31 | Tremaine Jackson (28) | Black | New Castle, Delaware | Jackson was attempting to shoplift a cart full of items at a Lowes when officers responded. He got into his vehicle and hit a police car and attempted to flee. He refused to comply with their commands and they shot him. |
| 2023-08-31 | Elizandro Vargas (31) | Hispanic | El Centro, California | Vargas was fatally shot and killed on 1900 block of Ocotillo Drive by an El Centro police officer after allegedly robbed a business on South Imperial Avenue. Police encountered Vargas walking down Ocotillo Drive, and at one point Vargas picked up a brick. Officers ordered Vargas to drop the brick, instead Vargas threw the brick at the officer (which missed), and was shot. Vargas later succumbed to his injuries at El Centro Regional Medical Center. |
| 2023-08-30 | Michael Kirkland (40) | White | Seguin, Texas | Kirkland had numerous outstanding felony warrants and a violent criminal history. He saw police and rammed into their vehicle and another vehicle. He then got out of his car and opened fire on the officers, critically wounding one. He was then shot by police. |
| 2023-08-30 | DeMarcus Williams (34) | Black | Southaven, Mississippi | Williams died after he allegedly pointed a firearm at deputies who were attempting to serve an arrest warrant. William's family members claim he was shot in the back. |
| 2023-08-30 | Berkley Collins Jr (74) | Unknown | Hopewell, Virginia | Collins was reported by a neighbor to be firing off his gun in the neighborhood. When police responded he was standing in his yard with a gun in each hand. He refused to comply with commands to drop the weapons and fired once. Police responded by shooting him. |
| 2023-08-30 | Victor Fernandes (21) | Hispanic | San Antonio, Texas | A man was killed and an officer was wounded after a police-involved shooting took place at a West Side Home Depot parking lot on Interstate 10. |
| 2023-08-30 | Nathan Grice (43) | White | Shreveport, Louisiana | |
| 2023-08-29 | Bernie Breeding (49) | Unknown | Marengo, Indiana | A Marengo man was shot and killed by Crawford County deputies and officers from nearby English after the man pointed a firearm at officers while serving an "emergency detention order". |
| 2023-08-28 | Thomas Carney (28) | White | Lehigh Acres, Florida | Shortly before the shooting, Lee County deputies were called to the area for domestic disturbance but were called off after no crime was made after arrival. Deputies were called back a few hours later and were told that a man fled with a gun. Deputies opened fire on the man, killing him. |
| 2023-08-28 | Jesse Nelson (43) | Unknown | San Diego, California | |
| 2023-08-28 | Paul Holland (47) | White | Pineville, Kentucky | A lifelong Pineville man was shot and killed by officers after a three-day search. Police reported that he fired shots at two Bell County deputies and disappeared on foot. |
| 2023-08-27 | Kendall Gilbert (40) | Black | Indianapolis, Indiana | |
| 2023-08-27 | Andrew Washington (52) | Black | Jersey City, New Jersey | |
| 2023-08-27 | Angel Ledesma (24) | Unknown | Los Angeles, California | Ledesma was shot outside a Northridge apartment complex after allegedly charging at LAPD officers with a knife after leaving the apartment and jumping over a large gate. |
| 2023-08-26 | unidentified male | Unknown | Beeville, Texas | A local man was killed by law enforcement after attempting to attacking officers with a knife after running towards them, jumped through a window, and attempted to attack during a weapons call. Police reported that the man had a mental episode and was given verbal commands before the attack. |
| 2023-08-26 | Casey J. Barlow (29) | Hispanic | Marion, Indiana | A man was shot and killed by law enforcement after flashing a gun at officers and fleeing from police. The police reported that the shooting happened after officers attempted to make contact with the man. |
| 2023-08-26 | unidentified male (37) | Unknown | Allendale, Michigan | A hostage situation ended violently when a 37-year-old man lost his life after officers opened fire on him. A 56-year-old woman who was held at hostage was released safely by law enforcement while the man continued to open fire at police. Officers returned fire, shooting the man to death. |
| 2023-08-25 | Anthony Richard Fields II (27) | Unknown | Newnan, Georgia | A 120 MPH high-speed pursuit through Interstate 85 with a Corvette ended violently with a shootout. After the driver stopped in the concrete gore, a second pursuit happened after the driver sped away. The driver smashed into one of the police vehicles, slightly injuring an officer. The driver got out soon after with a gun in his hand. The man was shot by officers afterward, fatally killing him. |
| 2023-08-25 | unidentified male | Unknown | Charlotte, North Carolina | A man was shot and killed by officers while responding to a domestic violence call in the Northlake area of Charlotte. |
| 2023-08-25 | Nolan Ray (31) | Unknown | Nixon, Nevada | Ray hit and killed Tribal officer Anthony Francone when he tried to stop a car driven by Ray. Francone was able to fire his firearm, killing Ray. |
| 2023-08-25 | Nathaniel Evans (41) | Unknown | North Little Rock, Arkansas | A 41-year-old Little Rock man was shot and killed by law enforcement after displaying his weapon and fled from officers to a nearby post office. |
| 2023-08-25 | D’Metrius Robinson (34) | Black | Gladstone, Missouri | |
| 2023-08-25 | Christapher Dodge (47) | White | South Portland, Maine | Police officers were called to an apartment complex in South Portland for a domestic violence call with reports of shots fired. When Officers arrived, the victim told them that Dodge fled in his pickup truck. Dodge later returned to the scene where police claimed he "engaged them in an armed confrontation". Officer Anthony Verville reportedly shot Dodge. Dodge died at the scene. |
| 2023-08-25 | Corey Andrew (24) | White | Celina, Ohio | A St. Marys, Ohio man was shot and killed by police after a short poursuit turned deadly. An officer checked with a stalled SUV at Eastview Park with two adults and a baby inside the vehicle during the overnight hours. While interviewing with an officer involving a strong marijuana odor coming out of his car, the man accelerated his vehicle into the grass and turned around back to the parking lot. During the short pursuit, one of the officers opened fire on the vehicle, striking the man. He was transported to a Coldwater hospital where he was pronounced dead. The passenger and the baby are uninjured. |
| 2023-08-25 | Sandra Lopez-Ochoa | Hispanic | Las Vegas, Nevada | |
| 2023-08-25 | Jayvion Barthel (20) | Black | Deland, Florida | Barthel died after he allegedly pointed a firearm at a DeLand police officer during a traffic stop. |
| 2023-08-24 | Jason Boles (29) | Hispanic | Bakersfield, California | |
| 2023-08-24 | Aaron Zimmerman (46) | White | West Jordan, Utah | |
| 2023-08-24 | Ta’Kiya Young (21) and her unborn child | Black | Westerville, Ohio | Young died after she was shot while in her vehicle the parking lot of a Kroger store located at 5991 S. Sunbury Road. She had been accused of stealing bottles of alcohol, and the killing officer claimed she tried to run him over with her vehicle. |
| 2023-08-23 | Eric Duprey (30) | Hispanic | The Bronx, New York | A plainclothes police sergeant threw a red cooler at Duprey as he fled police on a motorcycle in the Bronx. Duprey crashed into a medical barricade and car and died on the scene. |
| 2023-08-23 | John Snowling (59) | White | Trabuco Canyon, California | Snowling, an ex-Ventura police officer and former Massachusetts resident, died after he was shot by Orange County Sheriff deputies while seated inside a pickup truck. Snowling had just committed a mass shooting. |
| 2023-08-23 | Jamie Overstreet (36) | Black | Columbus, Ohio | |
| 2023-08-23 | William Hardison (63) | Black | Pittsburgh, Pennsylvania | |
| 2023-08-23 | Joan Rodriguez-Godiney (21) | Hispanic | Aurora, Colorado | |
| 2023-08-23 | Joseph Rothka (57) | Unknown | Union Dale, Pennsylvania | |
| 2023-08-23 | Kyeiree V Myers (28) | Black | Granite City, Illinois | |
| 2023-08-23 | Andrew Marlow (34) | White | Concord, North Carolina | |
| 2023-08-22 | Don Astor (39) | Unknown | Riverview, Florida | |
| 2023-08-21 | Larry Oden II (49) | White | Bessemer, Alabama | Died after sustaining a head injury from Bessemer police officers during an August 4th arrest. |
| 2023-08-20 | James Stroud (37) | White | Marion, North Carolina | |
| 2023-08-20 | Eugene McNeal (35) | Black | Memphis, Tennessee | McNeal was found dead after a standoff with gunshot wounds. It's unknown if McNeal was shot by officers or if he committed suicide. |
| 2023-08-20 | Peter Cory (28) | Asian | Charlotte, North Carolina | Shot after stabbing the officer that tried to take him into custody. |
| 2023-08-18 | Jaquan Fletcher | Black | Pontiac, Michigan | Deputies were called to investigate an unknown vehicle blocking a driveway. When deputies arrived they found Fletcher sleeping in the car with a gun in the seat next to him. The deputies removed the gun and placed it on the roof of the car. The police then ordered Fletcher to place his hands behind his back and Fletcher refused. The deputy on the passenger-side door partially entered the car to help. Fletcher then drove away with the officer still partially in the vehicle and hanging out of the car. Fletcher hit a police vehicle, a curb and a street sign before the deputy shot him. EMS took Fletcher to a hospital where he later died. |
| 2023-08-18 | Tahmon Wilson (20) | Black | Martinez, California | Police responded to a burglary alarm at a marijuana dispensary, though there was no indication from police or the dispensary that a burglary occurred. Tahmon Wilson and his brother attempted to drive away, and police fired several shots, hitting both Wilson and his brother. Tahmon Wilson died, while his brother was hospitalized. |
| 2023-08-18 | unidentified male | White | Detroit, Michigan | |
| 2023-08-18 | Travis Ikeguchi (27) | Asian | Cedar Glen, California | Ikeguchi shot and killed a clothing store owner after confronting her for having a pride flag outside her business. Ikeguchi was found nearby by deputies, who shot and killed him. |
| 2023-08-18 | William Gilmore (35) | White | Wilmington, North Carolina | |
| 2023-08-17 | Patrick Bauer (47) | White | Phoenix, Arizona | An IRS Special Agent was accidentally shot and killed by another agent during training exercises. |
| 2023-08-17 | Benjamin Annaboli (37) | White | Colorado Springs, Colorado | |
| 2023-08-16 | Adam Michael Trejo (37) | Hispanic | Nampa, Idaho | |
| 2023-08-16 | Theodore Deschler | White | Henderson, Tennessee | |
| 2023-08-15 | Xavier Benjamine Lacosta (31) | Hispanic | San Diego, California | |
| 2023-08-15 | unidentified male | Unknown | Sacramento, California | |
| 2023-08-15 | Brandon Green (31) | White | Clarksville, Tennessee | Police shot and killed brothers Leonard and Brandon Green during a shootout. |
| 2023-08-15 | Leonard Green (33) | White | Clarksville, Tennessee | Police shot and killed brothers Leonard and Brandon Green during a shootout. |
| 2023-08-15 | Jay Claremboux (44) | Unknown | Morse, Wisconsin | |
| 2023-08-15 | Alejandro Diaz (45) | Hispanic | Fontana, California | Police shot and killed Diaz, an off duty Los Angeles County Sheriff's deputy, after he allegedly pointed a gun at officers at a golf course. |
| 2023-08-15 | Richard Glass (65) | White | Jeffersonville, Indiana | |
| 2023-08-14 | Chad Pike (48) | White | Princeton, North Carolina | |
| 2023-08-14 | Eddie Jose Irizarry (27) | Hispanic | Philadelphia, Pennsylvania | Police spokesmen and news media outlets first reported that Irizarry was shot and killed because he lunged at an officer with a knife after several refusals to drop the weapon. However, police body camera reveal that Irizarry was still inside his car and compliant when officer Mark Dial shot him six times in the chest through the window, and Dial has been charged with murder. |
| 2023-08-14 | Zachary Johnson (28) | White | Ravenna, Michigan | |
| 2023-08-13 | Korey Unti (36) | White | Atwater, California | The Merced County Sheriff's Department attempted to initiate a traffic-stop on Unti. Unti fled in his vehicle. The police initiated a vehicle pursuit. Unti later pulled over and exited his vehicle, and led police on a foot-pursuit through an apartment complex. Authorities claimed Unti pulled out a gun and pointed at officers. An officer then shot and killed Unti. |
| 2023-08-13 | Olban Perdomo (27) | Hispanic | Los Angeles, California | |
| 2023-08-13 | Timothy Craig Setzer Jr (27) | White | Hickory, North Carolina | |
| 2023-08-12 | Eric Blaszczyk (37) | White | Wesley Chapel, Florida | |
| 2023-08-12 | Matthew Bigler (49) | White | Cadillac, Michigan | |
| 2023-08-12 | Bradley Van Heeswyk (25) | Unknown | Pleasant Hill, Iowa | |
| 2023-08-12 | Thomas Baskin (58) | Black | Saginaw, Michigan | |
| 2023-08-11 | Roger Sylvester Heard Jr. (34) | Black | Chattanooga, Tennessee | |
| 2023-08-11 | unidentified male | Unknown | Dickson, Tennessee | |
| 2023-08-11 | Louis Gordon-Hay (36) | Black | Chicago, Illinois | |
| 2023-08-11 | Pablo Cato Garcia (16) | Hispanic | Mesquite, Texas | |
| 2023-08-11 | unidentified male | Unknown | San Bernardino, California | |
| 2023-08-10 | Kevin Withrow (60) | Unknown | Watertown, Tennessee | |
| 2023-08-10 | Jonathan Heath-Taylor (25) | Unknown | Platte City, Missouri | |
| 2023-08-10 | Shawn Sheridan (34) | White | Russell, New York | |
| 2023-08-10 | Johnny Hollman (62) | Black | Atlanta, Georgia | Police responded after Hollman, a local deacon, was involved in a car accident while driving home from Bible study. After police determined Hollman was at fault one officer tased him when he refused to sign a traffic ticket. Hollman fell unresponsive and died, and his death was ruled a homicide. The officer who tased Hollman was later fired. |
| 2023-08-09 | Keivion Jones (33) | Black | Osceola, Arkansas | |
| 2023-08-09 | Craig Deleeuw Robertson (74) | White | Provo, Utah | FBI agents investigated Robertson at his home for making threats against President Joe Biden on Facebook. Specific details of the shooting were not released, but officials said Robertson was armed. |
| 2023-08-09 | Austin Huntzinger (29) | White | Columbus, Ohio | |
| 2023-08-08 | Cody Kuzior (41) | White | Tacoma, Washington | Calls were made in the week prior to the cops arriving to residents home, when swat arrived Cody was on top of his home in his boxers, making threats and was shot multiple times. Family suffers from mental illnesses, family believes he was in a manic state. |
| 2023-08-08 | Charles Rice (31) | Unknown | Conyers, Georgia | |
| 2023-08-08 | Daryl J Socia (46) | White | Essexville, Michigan | |
| 2023-08-08 | Jesse Nicholls (46) | White | Ransom, Kansas | |
| 2023-08-08 | Mike Alexander-Garcia (34) | Hispanic | West Hartford, Connecticut | Police pursued Alexander-Garcia and another man in connection with a stolen vehicle. Alexander-Garcia fled to a Town Fair Tire, where he entered a customer's car. After a K-9 unit and officer entered the vehicle, Alexander-Garcia began to drive away, hitting a car, before the officer shot him. The car then crashed into a nearby pole. |
| 2023-08-08 | Daniel Mark Smith (39) | White | Amarillo, Texas | |
| 2023-08-07 | Corey Wayne Thomas (36) | White | Dallas, Texas | U.S. Marshals fugitive task force members were serving a warrant on Thomas for murder. Thomas produced a gun before they fatally shot him. One of the members who fired their weapons, Matthew Bacon, committed suicide the next day. |
| 2023-08-07 | Arturo Cernas (34) | Hispanic | Carson, California | |
| 2023-08-07 | Michael Ruzycky (44) | White | Poplar Bluff, Missouri | |
| 2023-08-06 | Daniel Legler (35) | White | Rochester, New York | |
| 2023-08-06 | Darron Shaw (17) | Black | Lancaster, Pennsylvania | |
| 2023-08-06 | Jason Hampton (41) | Unknown | La Mesa, California | |
| 2023-08-06 | Reinaldo Carballo-Morales | Hispanic | Tucson, Arizona | |
| 2023-08-06 | Juan Johnson | Black | Jacksonville, Florida | |
| 2023-08-06 | Shannon Wayne Marshall (40) | White | Mission, Kansas | |
| 2023-08-06 | David Algarin Jr. (30) | White | Sturgis, Michigan | Murder suspect. |
| 2023-08-05 | Zachary Bryson (27) | White | Columbus, Ohio | |
| 2023-08-05 | Brandon Cole (36) | Black | Denver, Colorado | |
| 2023-08-05 | Larry Dunham (63) | White | Rowsburg, Ohio | |
| 2023-08-04 | Tahiem Cooks-Week (22) | Black | Philadelphia, Pennsylvania | |
| 2023-08-04 | unidentified male (21) | Unknown | Manhattan, New York | |
| 2023-08-04 | Marquis Rivera (22) | Black | Columbia, Missouri | |
| 2023-08-04 | Julio Sifuentes (43) | Hispanic | Houston, Texas | |
| 2023-08-04 | Daton Shimondrea Viel (28) | Black | Orlando, Florida | |
| 2023-08-03 | Elaine Helman (51) | White | Vandalia, Ohio | Police shot and killed Elaine and Rodney Helman after they hijacked a semi-truck and held its driver hostage. |
| 2023-08-03 | Rodney Helman (54) | White | Vandalia, Ohio | Police shot and killed Elaine and Rodney Helman after they hijacked a semi-truck and held its driver hostage. |
| 2023-08-03 | Andrew David Massey (35) | White | Hartford, Alabama | |
| 2023-08-03 | Ny'Kendreon Pride (20) | Black | Mesa, Arizona | |
| 2023-08-03 | James B. Monti (47) | White | Louisville, Kentucky | |
| 2023-08-03 | Gary Dwayne Harrell (49) | Black | Indianapolis, Indiana | Police shot and killed Harrell during a traffic stop as he ran away. As Harrell ran away holding a revolver, an officer shot Harrell in the back. |
| 2023-08-03 | Christian Johnson (54) | Unknown | Boise, Idaho | |
| 2023-08-03 | Sean Haddock (36) | White | Edmond, Oklahoma | An Edmond Police lieutenant was arrested and charged with manslaughter after she called 911 to report she had shot her brother Sean Haddock. |
| 2023-08-02 | Nathan Briese (37) | White | Neenah, Wisconsin | |
| 2023-08-02 | Alfred Shawntez Cole (19) | Black | Thomasville, Georgia | |
| 2023-08-02 | Benjamin Pickens (33) | Unknown | San Diego, California | Shot after raising a firearm at San Diego Police officers. The man was wanted for shooting and wounding a 24-year-old man. |

== See also ==
- Death in custody § United States
- Henry A. Wallace Police Crime Public Database
- List of cases of police brutality
- List of countries with annual rates and counts for killings by law enforcement officers
- List of law enforcement officers killed in the line of duty in the United States
- List of law enforcement officers convicted for an on-duty killing in the United States
- List of shootings by US immigration agents
- List of police reforms related to the George Floyd protests
- List of unarmed African Americans killed by law enforcement officers in the United States
- Lists of killings by law enforcement officers
- Police brutality in the United States
- Police misconduct § United States
- Police riot § United States
- Police use of deadly force in the United States
