= Kane Mountain Fire Observation Station =

- U.S. National Register of Historic Places
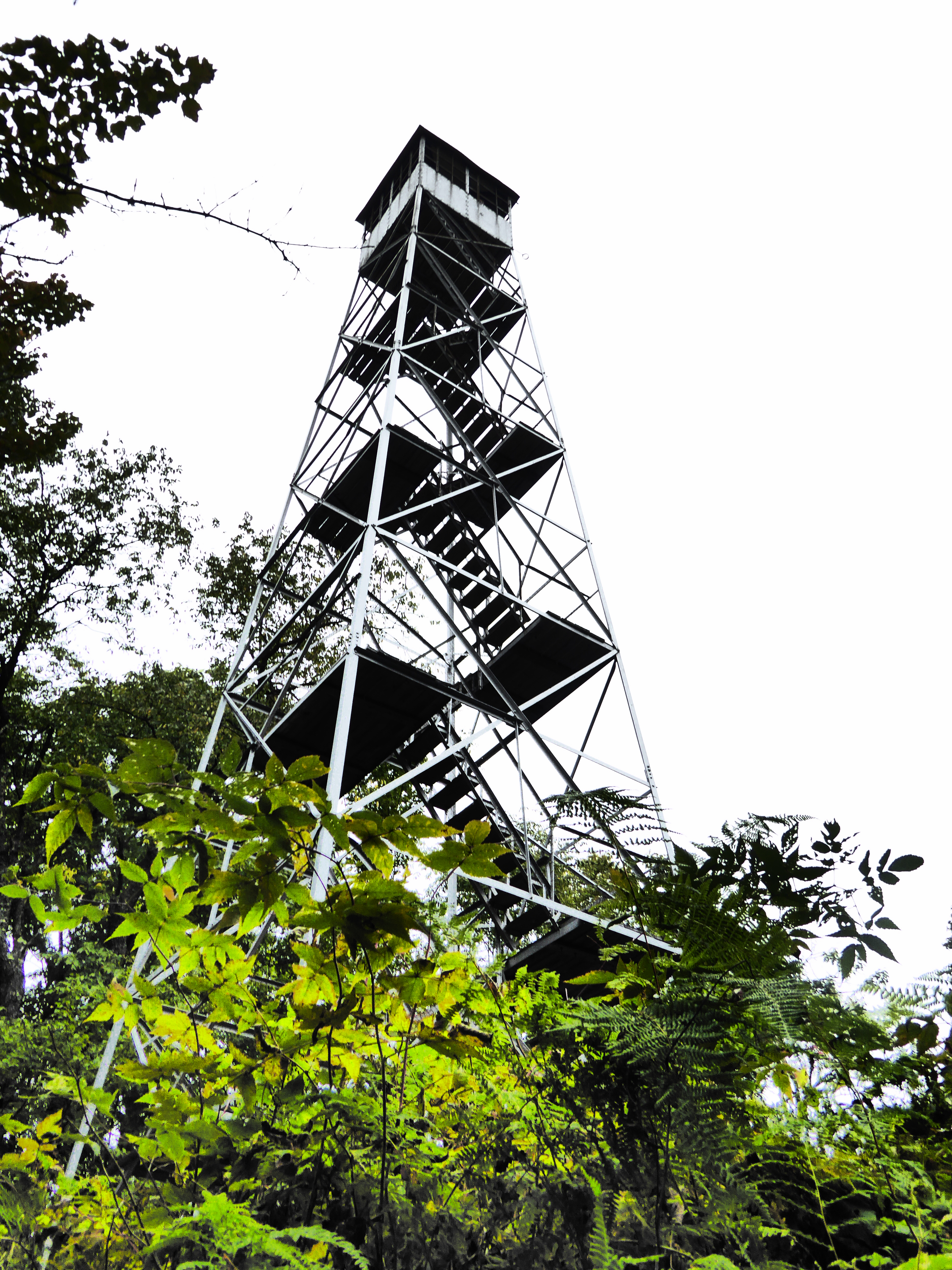
- The Kane Mountain Fire Tower

- Location within New York Location within the United States
- Location: Kane Mountain, Caroga, New York
- Coordinates: 43°10′29″N 74°31′4″W
- Area: 3.3 acres (1.3 ha)
- Built: 1925
- Architect: Aermotor Corporation
- MPS: Fire Observation Stations of New York State Forest Preserve MPS
- NRHP reference No.: 01001033
- Added to NRHP: September 23, 2001

The Kane Mountain Fire Observation Station is a historic fire observation station located on Kane Mountain at Caroga in Fulton County, New York. The station includes a 60-foot-tall (18 m), steel-frame lookout tower erected in 1925, an observer's cabin built about 1960, and foot trail. The tower and trail are contributing resources. The tower is a prefabricated structure built by the Aermotor Corporation and provided a front line of defense in preserving the Adirondack Forest Preserve from the hazards of forest fires.

It was added to the National Register of Historic Places in 2001.

The Kane Mountain Fire Observation Station can be accessed via three separate foot trails leading to the summit of Kane Mountain. The main trail runs from Green Lake Rd. This 0.5 mile hike climbs 600 ft. to the top of the mountain at 2200 ft. above sea level. The trail is moderate in difficulty. The second trail runs from Schoolhouse Road. This is a shorter ascent to the top, however its difficulty is higher due to a steeper grade and rocks. A third trail can be accessed either from the Green Lake Rd. trailhead or from the Pine Lake Campground.
