= West Lake (New York) =

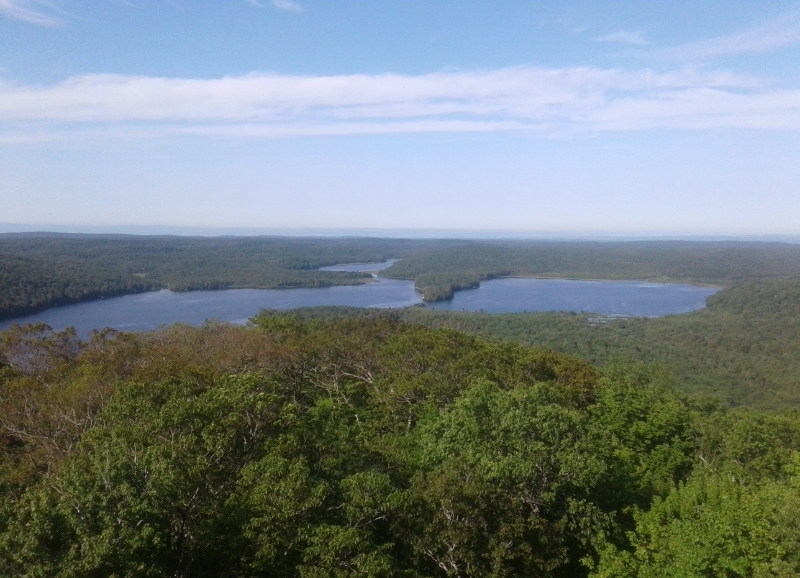
- View of West Lake (right), west end of Canada Lake (left), and Lily Lake (top) from the top of Kane Mountain. Dolgeville Point separates West and Canada Lakes.

- Location within New York West Lake (the United States)
- Location: Fulton County, New York, United States
- Coordinates: 43°10′12″N 74°32′28″W
- Type: Lake
- Primary outflows: Canada Lake
- Basin countries: United States
- Surface area: 193 acres (0.78 km^{2})
- Average depth: 11 feet (3.4 m)
- Max. depth: 28 feet (8.5 m)
- Shore length^{1}: 2.2 miles (3.5 km)
- Surface elevation: 1,549 feet (472 m)
- Settlements: W of Canada Lake (hamlet)
- ^{1} Shore length is not a well-defined measure.

West Lake is located west of the Hamlet of Canada Lake. The outlet of West Lake is Canada Lake. Fish species present in the lake are pickerel, black bullhead, white sucker, rock bass, carp, yellow perch, and pumpkinseed sunfish. There is a state owned hard surface ramp off Point Breeze Road.
