= Peck Lake =

Man-made lake in Bleecker, New York

- Location within New York Location within the United States
- Coordinates: 43.112°N 74.410°W
- Primary outflows: Peck Creek
- Basin countries: United States
- Max. length: 5 miles (8.0 km)
- Max. width: 2 miles (3.2 km)
- Surface area: 1,370 acres (5.5 km^{2})
- Average depth: 14 feet (4.3 m)
- Max. depth: 40 feet (12 m)
- Shore length^{1}: 13.9 feet (4.2 m)
- Settlements: Caroga Lake, New York
- ^{1} Shore length is not a well-defined measure.

Peck Lake is man-made lake in the Town of Bleecker, New York in Fulton County, in the southern Adirondack region. It was created with a dam and combined the old Peck's Pond, East Lake, and Gould Lake. The lake is named after John Peck.

== History ==
The Mohawk Hydro-Electric Company, wanted to build a hydroelectric station in Ephratah, and needed an upstream reservoir that produced enough water for the operation of this plant. Peck's Pond was chosen due to its close location. The power company built a dam at the outlet of the present day mill pond. The dam raised the water level 20 or so feet.

== Climate ==
Climate data for Peck Lake, New York, 1991–2020 normals, 2008-2022 snowfall: 1455ft (443m)
Month	Jan	Feb	Mar	Apr	May	Jun	Jul	Aug	Sep	Oct	Nov	Dec	Year
Mean daily maximum °F (°C)	24.5 (−4.2)	27.1 (−2.7)	35.3 (1.8)	48.1 (8.9)	62.9 (17.2)	71.5 (21.9)	76.7 (24.8)	73.1 (22.8)	66.9 (19.4)	53.0 (11.7)	40.5 (4.7)	30.4 (−0.9)	50.8 (10.5)
Daily mean °F (°C)	15.8 (−9.0)	17.4 (−8.1)	25.8 (−3.4)	38.8 (3.8)	52.5 (11.4)	61.7 (16.5)	66.2 (19.0)	63.5 (17.5)	56.6 (13.7)	44.3 (6.8)	32.8 (0.4)	23.1 (−4.9)	41.5 (5.3)
Mean daily minimum °F (°C)	7.1 (−13.8)	7.8 (−13.4)	16.4 (−8.7)	29.4 (−1.4)	42.1 (5.6)	51.9 (11.1)	55.8 (13.2)	53.9 (12.2)	46.3 (7.9)	35.6 (2.0)	25.1 (−3.8)	15.7 (−9.1)	32.3 (0.1)
Average precipitation inches (mm)	3.87 (98)	3.48 (88)	3.72 (94)	4.35 (110)	4.47 (114)	4.91 (125)	4.83 (123)	4.10 (104)	4.34 (110)	4.87 (124)	3.65 (93)	4.14 (105)	50.73 (1,288)
Average snowfall inches (cm)	27.4 (70)	33.7 (86)	18.2 (46)	3.7 (9.4)	0.2 (0.51)	0.0 (0.0)	0.0 (0.0)	0.0 (0.0)	0.0 (0.0)	1.1 (2.8)	8.1 (21)	25.0 (64)	117.4 (299.71)
Source 1: NOAA
Source 2: XMACIS (snowfall)
