= Caroga, New York =

- Town
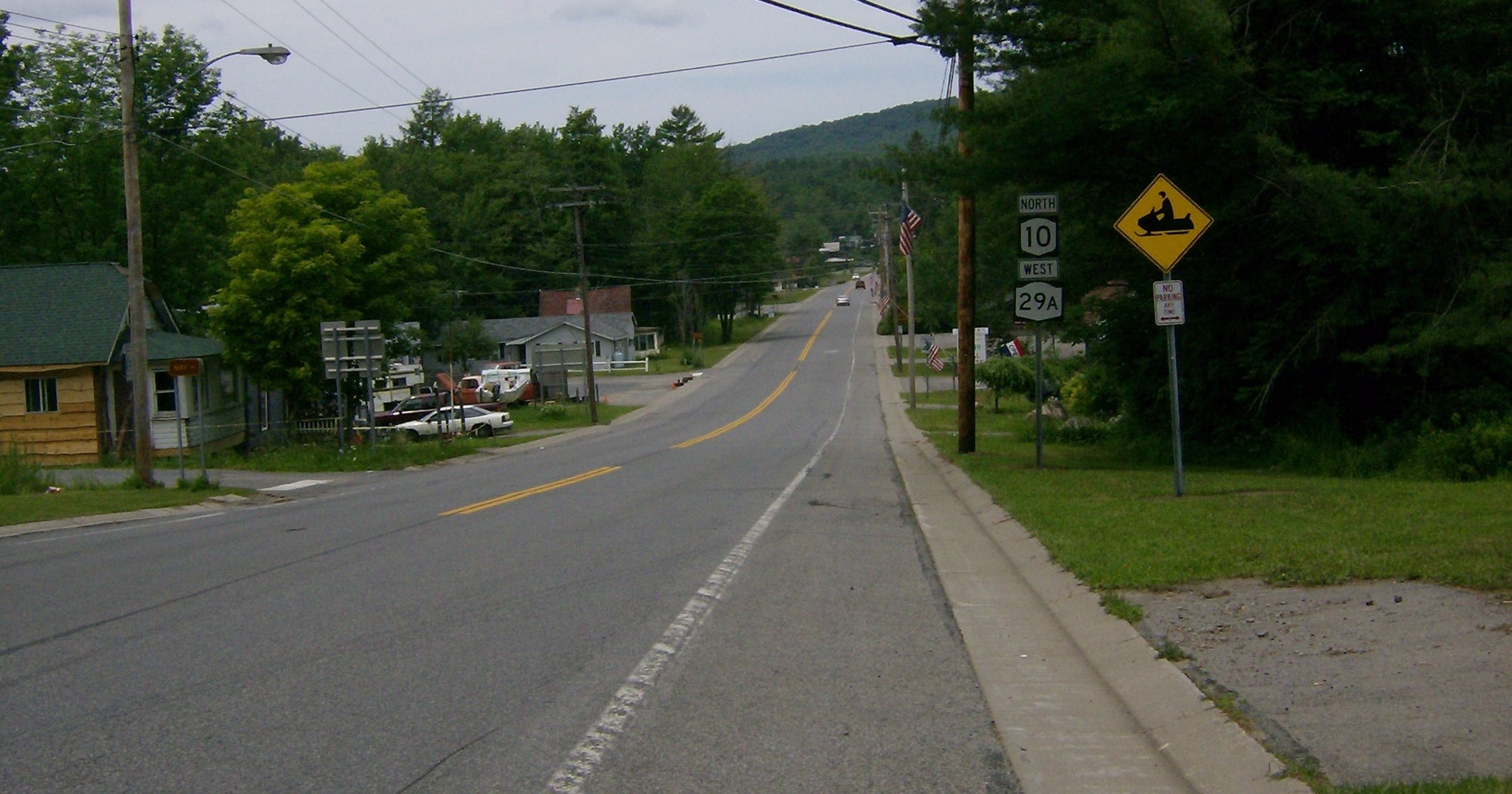
- Hamlet of Caroga Lake

- Location within New York Location within the United States
- Coordinates: 43°8′36″N 74°29′24″W
- Country: United States
- State: New York
- County: Fulton

Government
  - Type: Town Council
  - Town Supervisor: Ralph Palcovic (R)
  - Town Council: Members' List: • John Glenn (R); • Barbara DeLuca (R); • Richard Sturgess (R); • Matthew Cooper (R)

Area
  - Total: 54.28 sq mi (140.58 km^{2})
  - Land: 50.63 sq mi (131.12 km^{2})
  - Water: 3.65 sq mi (9.46 km^{2})
- Elevation: 1,637 ft (499 m)

Population (2010)
  - Total: 1,205
  - Estimate (2016): 1,162
  - Density: 22.9/sq mi (8.86/km^{2})
- Time zone: UTC-5 (Eastern (EST))
  - Summer (DST): UTC-4 (EDT)
- ZIP Codes: 12032 (Caroga Lake); 12078 (Gloversville); 12095 (Johnstown)
- Area code: 518
- FIPS code: 36-035-12573
- GNIS feature ID: 0978794
- Website: townofcaroga.com

Caroga is a town in Fulton County, New York, United States. The population was 1,205 at the 2010 census. The town was named after a local creek.

Caroga is in the northern part of the county, northwest of Gloversville and Johnstown.

== History ==
The town was first settled circa 1783.

The town was created in 1842 from parts of the towns of Bleecker, Johnstown, and Stratford.

The name of the town is an altered spelling of Garoga [Creek], which flows south from the town towards the Mohawk River.

The industry of the early town was based on lumber and tanning. By 1890, the population was 624.

== Geography ==
According to the United States Census Bureau, the town has a total area of 54.3 square miles (140.6 km^{2}), of which 50.6 square miles (131.1 km^{2}) is land and 3.7 square miles (9.5 km^{2}), or 6.73%, is water.

Caroga is inside the Adirondack Park. The northern town line is the border of Hamilton County.

New York State Route 10 is a north–south highway in Caroga. It leads north to Piseco Lake in the town of Arietta and south to Canajoharie on the Mohawk River. New York State Route 29A is an east–west highway intersecting NY-10 near Pine Lake and then running southward as a conjoined highway to Caroga Lake. NY 29A leads southeast to Gloversville and west to Salisbury. New York State Route 10A branches off NY-10 to the southeast near Bradtville, providing a route to Johnstown, the Fulton County seat.

== Demographics ==
Historical population
Census	Pop.	Note	%±
1850	589		—
1860	629		6.8%
1870	828		31.6%
1880	855		3.3%
1890	624		−27.0%
1900	470		−24.7%
1910	441		−6.2%
1920	332		−24.7%
1930	306		−7.8%
1940	408		33.3%
1950	462		13.2%
1960	568		22.9%
1970	822		44.7%
1980	1,177		43.2%
1990	1,337		13.6%
2000	1,407		5.2%
2010	1,205		−14.4%
2016 (est.)	1,162		−3.6%
U.S. Decennial Census

As of the census of 2000, there were 1,407 people, 588 households, and 392 families residing in the town. The population density was 27.7 inhabitants per square mile (10.7/km^{2}). There were 1,794 housing units at an average density of 35.3 per square mile (13.6/km^{2}). The racial makeup of the town was 98.86% White, 0.07% Native American, 0.14% Asian, 0.07% Pacific Islander, and 0.85% from two or more races. Hispanic or Latino of any race were 0.21% of the population.

There were 588 households, out of which 27.9% had children under the age of 18 living with them, 53.7% were married couples living together, 7.7% had a female householder with no husband present, and 33.2% were non-families. 26.2% of all households were made up of individuals, and 11.9% had someone living alone who was 65 years of age or older. The average household size was 2.39 and the average family size was 2.87.

In the town, the population was spread out, with 22.9% under the age of 18, 5.0% from 18 to 24, 27.1% from 25 to 44, 28.4% from 45 to 64, and 16.6% who were 65 years of age or older. The median age was 42 years. For every 100 females, there were 105.4 males. For every 100 females age 18 and over, there were 107.9 males.

The median income for a household in the town was $34,911, and the median income for a family was $36,852. Males had a median income of $26,452 versus $22,067 for females. The per capita income for the town was $18,048. About 6.7% of families and 9.0% of the population were below the poverty line, including 12.1% of those under age 18 and 9.7% of those age 65 or over.

== Communities and locations in Caroga ==
- Bradtville – A location near the southern town line on NY-10.
- Camelhump – A mountain located east of Kane Mountain.
- Canada Lake – A hamlet north of the water body of the same name.
- Canada Lake – A lake located south of the community of Canada Lake and north of Caroga Lake, near the center of the town.
- Caroga Creek – A stream flowing southward through the town.
- Caroga Lake – A hamlet between East Caroga Lake and West Caroga Lake on NY-10.
- Caroga Historical Museum – A museum complex featuring historic buildings and exhibits on local history including Sherman's Amusement Park memorabilia.
- East Caroga Lake – A lake in the south-central part of the town, linked to West Caroga Lake.
- Glasgow Mills – A hamlet in the southwestern section of the town.
- Green Lake – A lake located by the hamlet of Canada Lake.
- Kane Mountain – A mountain located north of the hamlet of Canada Lake.
- Lily Lake – A lake located southwest of Canada Lake.
- Newkirk (formerly "Newkirks Mills") – A hamlet southwest of Caroga Lake hamlet on NY-10. It was once the principal settlement in the town.
- Nine Corner Lake – A lake located northwest of Canada Lake.
- North Bush – A hamlet in the southern part of the town on County Road 137, and was the location of the first school in the town.
- Pine Lake – A lake north of Canada Lake and east of NY-10.
- Pine Mountain – A mountain located east of Pine Lake.
- Royal Mountain – A skiing area near the southern town line.
- Sheeley Mountain – A mountain located east of Kane Mountain.
- Sherman's Park – Former amusement park on the shores of West Caroga Lake. Home to the Caroga Lake Music Festival presented by Caroga Arts Collective.
- Stewart Lake – A lake located north of Wheelerville.
- Stoner Lakes – Three linked lakes by the northern town line.
- West Caroga Lake – A lake in the south-central part of the town linked to East Caroga Lake.
- West Lake – A lake located west of the hamlet of Canada Lake. It is connected to Canada Lake.
- Wheelerville – A hamlet north of Caroga Lake hamlet on NY-10.
