= Green Lake (Fulton County, New York) =

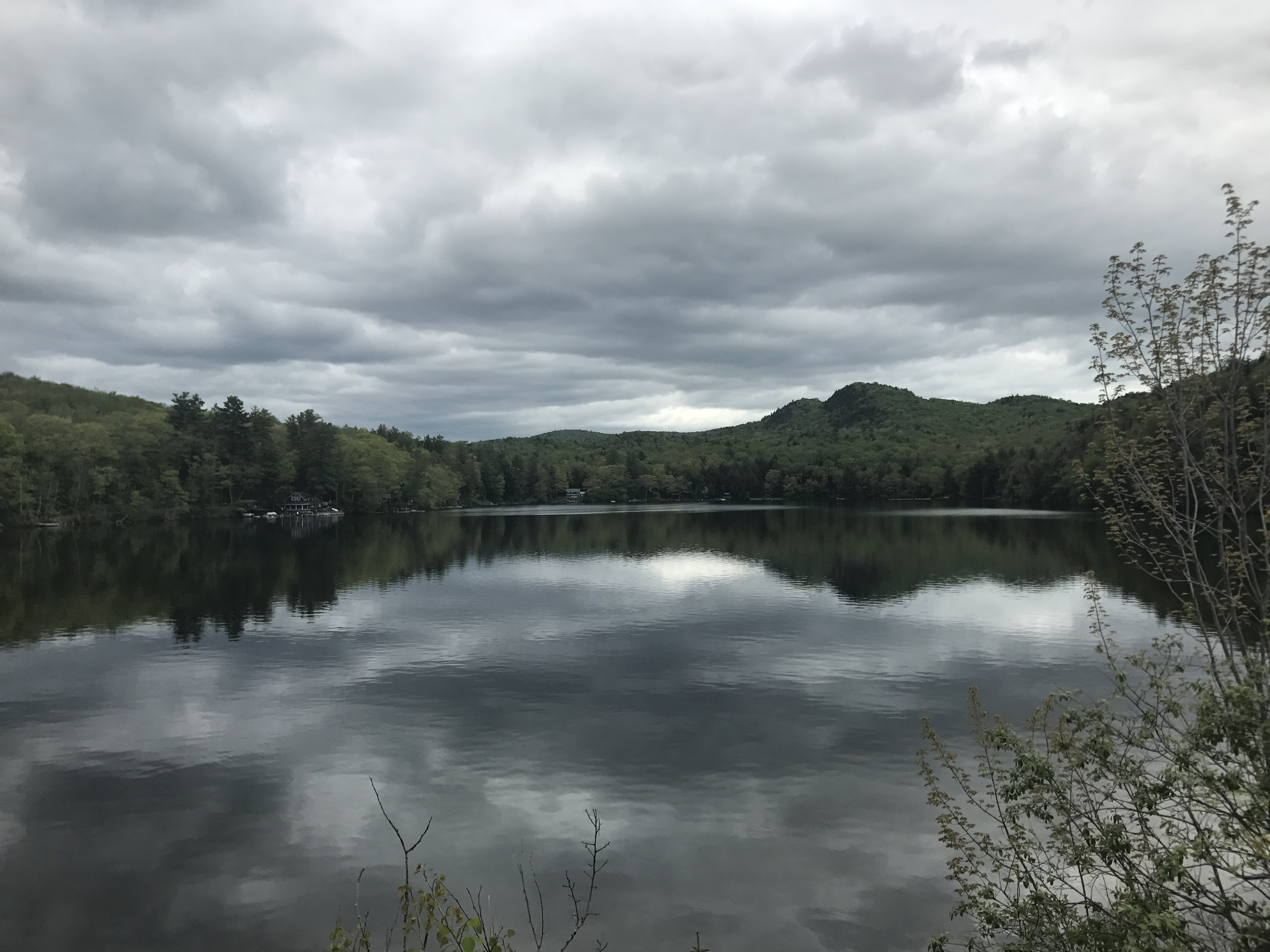
- Green Lake looking east

- Location within New York Green Lake (the United States)
- Location: Fulton County, New York, United States
- Coordinates: 43°10′33″N 74°30′24″W
- Type: Lake
- Primary outflows: Canada Lake
- Basin countries: United States
- Surface area: 45 acres (0.18 km^{2})
- Average depth: 15 feet (4.6 m)
- Max. depth: 52 feet (16 m)
- Shore length^{1}: 1.2 miles (1.9 km)
- Surface elevation: 1,549 feet (472 m)
- Settlements: Canada Lake, New York
- ^{1} Shore length is not a well-defined measure.

Green Lake is located east of Canada Lake, New York. Fish species present in the lake are pickerel, black bullhead, rock bass, yellow perch, and pumpkinseed sunfish. There is access by trail off Green Lake Road along the west shore. It is also accessible by a channel from Canada Lake on the southwest corner.
