= Middle Stoner Lake =

Lake in New York, United States

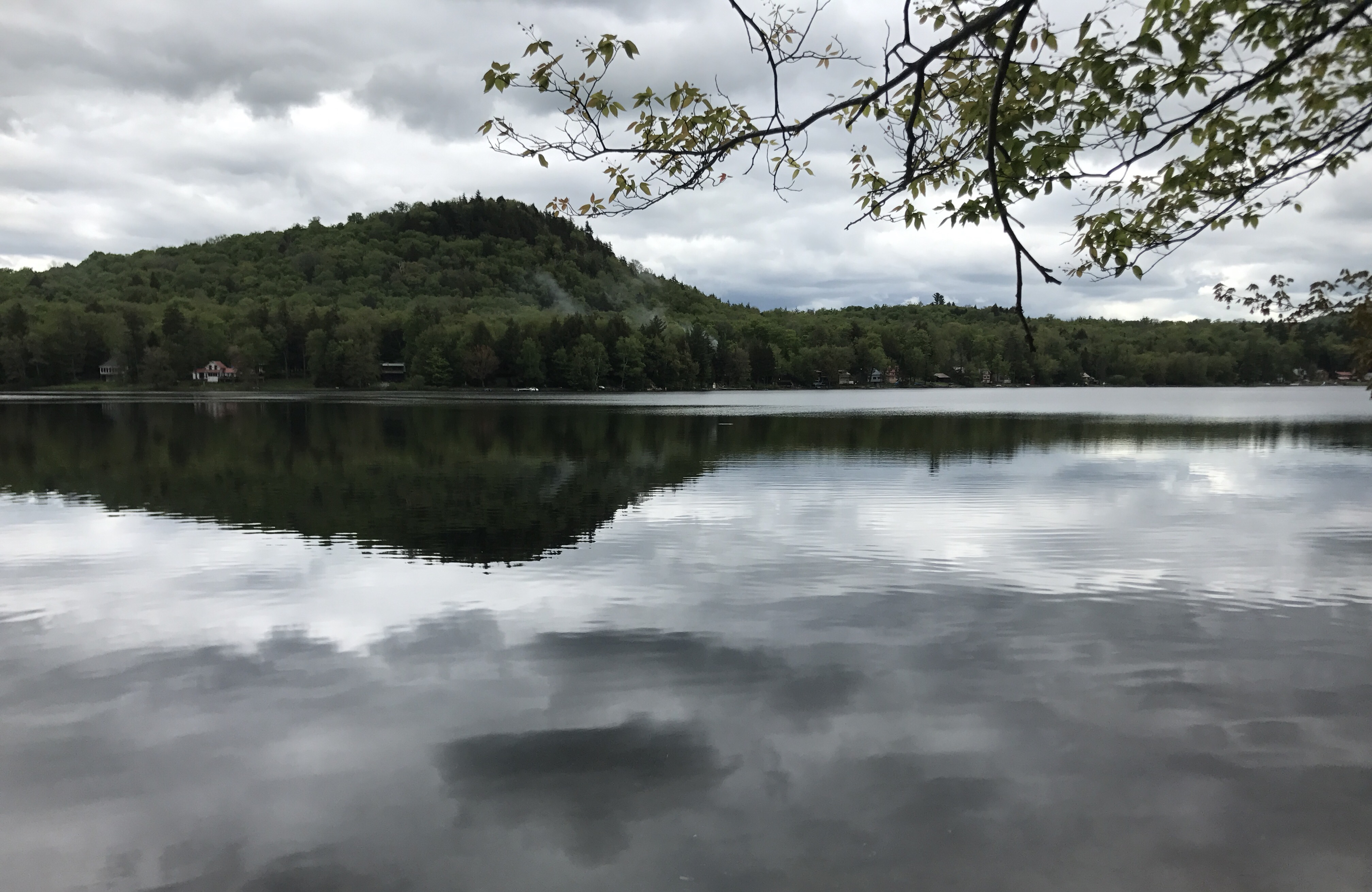
- Middle Stoner Lake

- Location within New York Location within the United States
- Location: Fulton County, New York, United States
- Coordinates: 43°13′36.23″N 74°31′3.03″W
- Type: Lake
- Basin countries: United States
- Surface area: 83 acres (0.34 km^{2})
- Average depth: 10 feet (3.0 m)
- Max. depth: 27 feet (8.2 m)
- Shore length^{1}: 1.8 miles (2.9 km)
- Surface elevation: 1,650 feet (500 m)
- Settlements: Canada Lake, New York
- ^{1} Shore length is not a well-defined measure.

Middle Stoner Lake is an oligotrophic lake that is located north of Canada Lake, New York. It is one of three lakes that make up the Stoner Lake system. Fish species present in the lake are pickerel, black bullhead, largemouth bass, yellow perch, and sunfish. There is carry down access at the bridge off NY-10 on the north shore.
