= Nine Corner Lake =

- Location within New York Location within the United States
- Location: Fulton County, New York, United States
- Coordinates: 43.19462°N 74.5509°W
- Type: Lake
- Basin countries: United States
- Surface area: 111 acres (0.45 km^{2})
- Average depth: 18 feet (5.5 m)
- Max. depth: 48 feet (15 m)
- Shore length^{1}: 3.5 miles (5.6 km)
- Surface elevation: 1,870 feet (570 m)
- Settlements: Canada Lake, New York
- ^{1} Shore length is not a well-defined measure.

Nine Corner Lake is located northwest of Canada Lake, New York. Fish species present in the lake are brook trout, black bullhead, yellow perch, and pumpkinseed sunfish. There is carry down access via trail off CR-29A.
