= Mountain Lake (New York) =

Lake in New York, United States

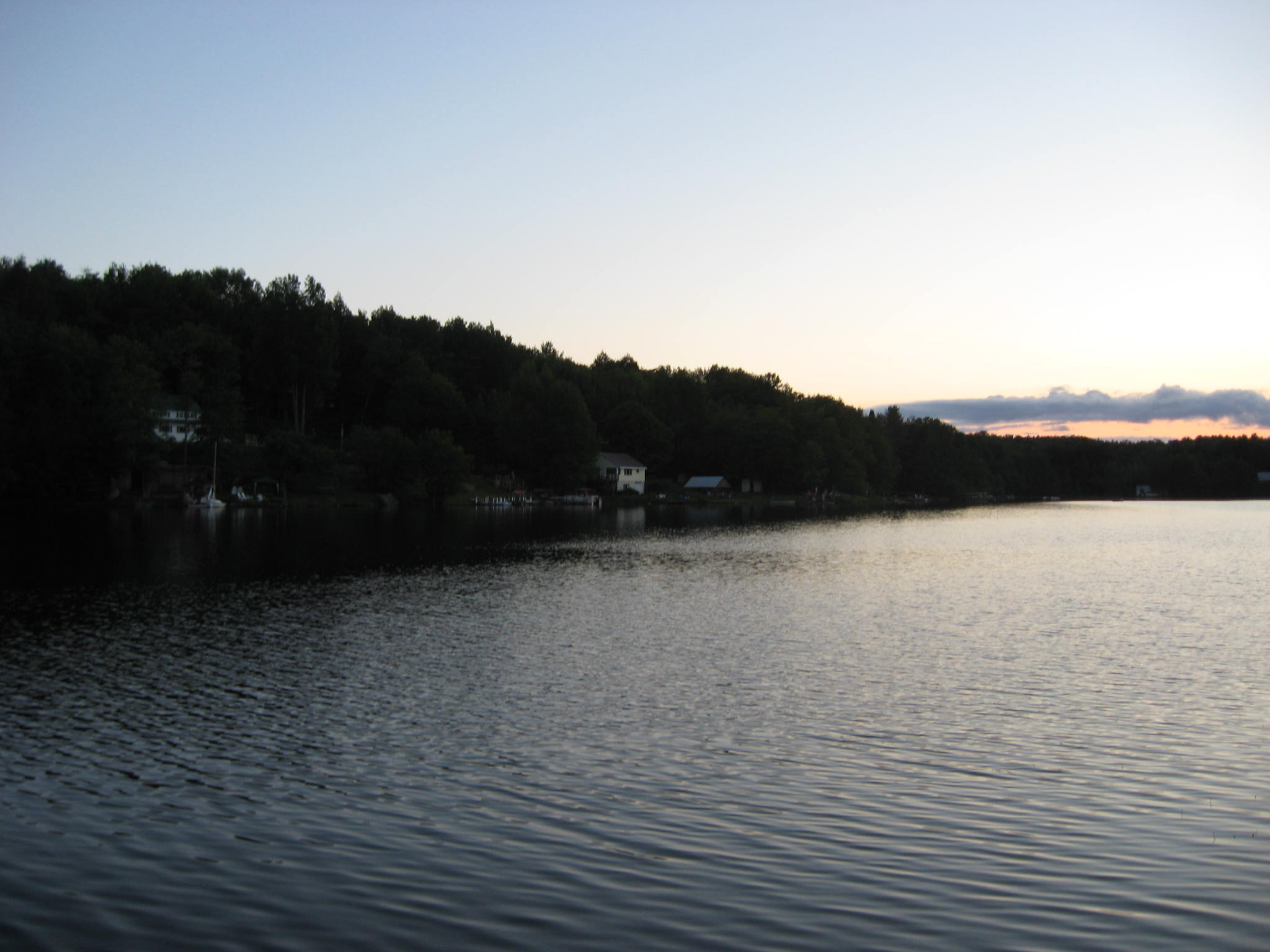
- Mountain Lake during the summer.

- Location within New York Location within the United States
- Location: Adirondack Park, Fulton County, New York, US
- Coordinates: 43°06′23″N 74°22′11″W
- Primary inflows: Spring fed
- Primary outflows: Dam on north western end
- Catchment area: Vandenburg Pond
- Basin countries: United States
- Max. length: 300 m (980 ft)
- Max. width: 100 m (330 ft)
- Average depth: 6 to 10 m (20 to 33 ft)
- Max. depth: 15 m (49 ft)
- Residence time: seasonal to permanent
- Islands: Elmer Island, a small island made up of mostly rock.
- Settlements: Gloversville

Mountain Lake is situated in southern Adirondack Park in Bleecker, New York. It is located just west of Great Sacandaga Lake. The lake was called Carpenter's Lake in the 19th century. The lake contains one small island, Elmer Island, located towards the western end. There is a dam on the northwestern end of the lake. Its outlet flows into Vandenburgh Pond. During an era of economic prosperity with leather and glove manufacturing in the local communities, the lake was a popular resort area for people of Gloversville and Johnstown in the late 18th and early 19th centuries. There was at one time an electric train line that ran from the northern end of Gloversville up Bleecker Mountain to a station at the lake for vacationers. This line was owned at one time by the FJ&G RR Co.

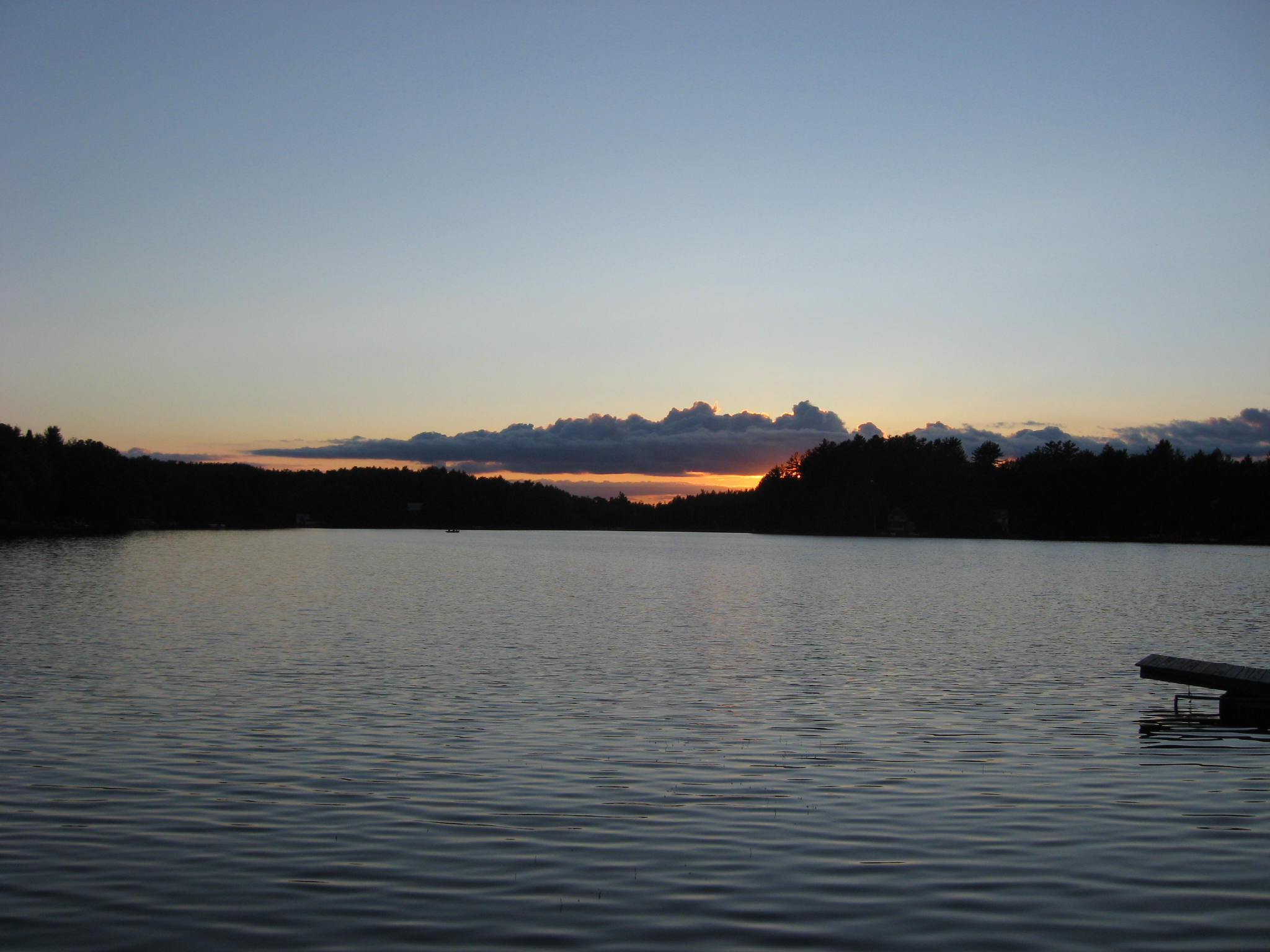
Mountain Lake at sunset during the summer.

== Mountain Lake Hotel ==
A hotel was located on the lake in the early 1900s, but it later succumbed to fire.

== Mountain Lake Railroad wreck ==
On July 4, 1902, at about 9:20 p.m., 14 people were killed and several more injured when a rear-end collision occurred on the Mountain Lake Railroad. Here is a link about this event, with some postcards of the area around the start of the 20th century: http://www.fjgrr.org/Mountain_Lake_Electric.html

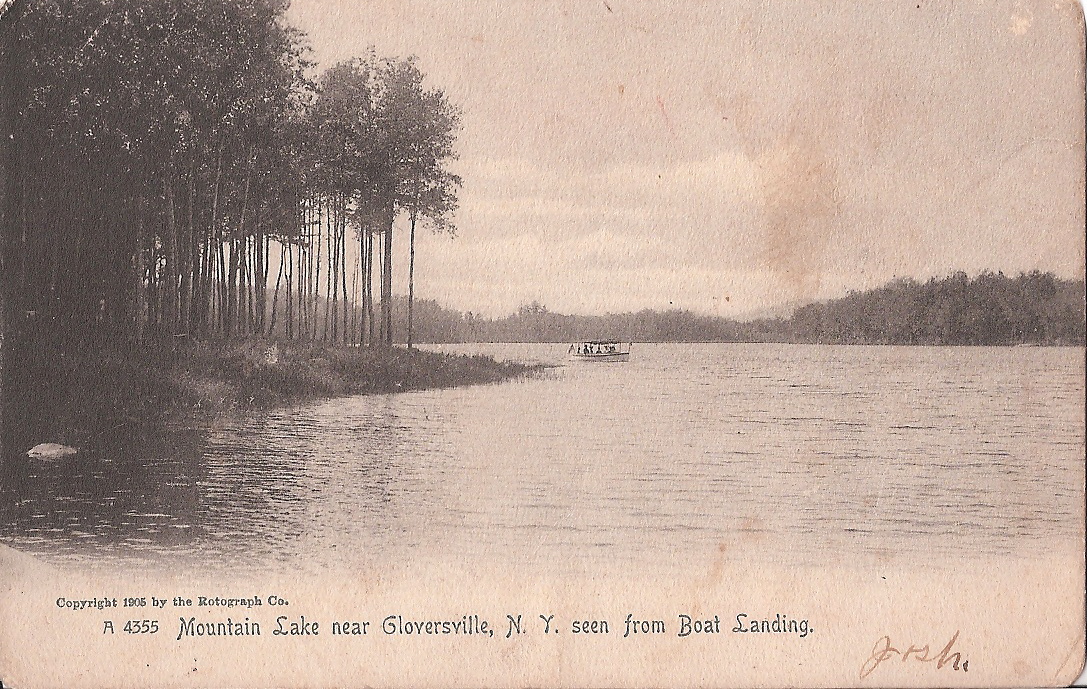
