= List of killings by law enforcement officers in the United States, September 2023 =

This is a list of people reported killed by non-military law enforcement officers in the United States in September 2023, whether in the line of duty or not, and regardless of reason or method. The listing documents the occurrence of a death, making no implications regarding wrongdoing or justification on the part of the person killed or officer involved. Killings are arranged by date of the incident that caused death. Different death dates, if known, are noted in the description. The table below lists 91 people.

== September 2023 ==
Date	Name (age) of deceased	Race	Location	Description
2023-09-30	David Rodriguez Lopez (30)	White	Idabel, Oklahoma	During a hours-long standoff between local police, the Oklahoma Highway Patrol and the Choctaw Nation Lighthorse Police SWAT team, the man got out of his house and accessed into a vehicle and attempted to flee the scene, attempting to drive toward officers before being fatally shot by officers.
2023-09-30	Camren Darden (17)	Black	Springfield, Illinois	An inmate at the Sangamon County Juvenile Center fired four shots in the facility and took a female inmate hostage before being killed by police.
2023-09-30	Isaac Ocegueda (18)	Unknown	Salem, Oregon	Two boys in a vehicle drove off during a traffic stop initiated by an Independence officer. Officers deployed spike strips to stop the pursuit, after which two boys got out of the car and ran off. Oregon State Police reported that one of the suspects shot at officers, hitting one Polk County deputy. Law enforcement officers then opened fire, killing one and injuring another in the exchange of gunfire.
2023-09-29	William Hicks Jr. (56)	Unknown	Soddy Daisy, Tennessee	A 56-year-old man was fatally wounded by officers after assaulting an officer with the knife in a potential suicide individual call. The man was pronounced dead at a nearby hospital.
2023-09-29	Alivia Schwab (40)	White	Morris, Illinois	While on the phone with a mental health hotline, Schwab allegedly approached a police vehicle while holding a knife. An officer fired four shots at her, hitting her three times.
2023-09-29	James Brown (40)	Unknown	Fountain, Florida	A man wanted on warrants for aggravated assault with a deadly weapon was killed by officers after barricading in his home for six hours.
2023-09-29	Thomas McGinty (46)	Unknown	Mesa, Arizona	A 46-year-old father was killed by officers after their commands to drop a knife after pulling out the weapon while getting out of his vehicle. Officers reported that a 911 call was released before the killing, saying that the suicidal man was in his vehicle with a hose attached to the tailpipe.
2023-09-29	Stephen Perkins (39)	Black	Decatur, Alabama	Police responded to Perkins' home after a tow truck driver reported Perkins had pointed a gun at him. Police shot and killed Perkins, who was holding a gun with a light attached, in front of the house. Police initially stated officers had ordered him to drop the gun multiple times, but the police chief later apologized and said that police had actually told Perkins to get on the ground before firing.
2023-09-29	unidentified male (17)	Unknown	Houston, Texas	A 17-year-old boy was killed while fleeing from officers with a group of armed men in the Trinity/Houston Gardens area. One of the officers struck the boy while investigating outside an apartment complex.
2023-09-28	Keith Galen Bach (63)	White	San Diego, California	Bach, a diabetic man, was arrested for vandalism on September 25. According to a lawsuit, even though jail staff were informed of his condition and inmates told guards that Bach's insulin pump was empty, no guards gave him insulin, causing his death from diabetic ketoacidosis. Bach's death was ruled a homicide.
2023-09-28	Justin Gonzales (36)	Latino	West Allis, Wisconsin	After arriving at a family domestic dispute call, officers encountered the man who was armed with two knives. During the encounter, several officers discharged their weapons. Four West Allis officers fired their service weapons, while one West Allis officer used "non-lethal force." The five involved officers in the shooting were placed on administrative leave afterward.
2023-09-28	Daymon Hubbard (47)	White	Bedford, Indiana	A woman drove to the Bedford Police station to report Hubbard was following her. Shortly after, an officer noticed his vehicle and police pursued him until his car struck a patrol vehicle. According to police, "the incident escalated", leading officers to shoot Hubbard.
2023-09-27	Ernest Burbage III (38)	White	Johns Island, South Carolina	A 38-year-old man was fatally shot by officers after fatally wounding a K9, wounding two sheriff's deputies during a large standoff.
2023-09-27	Tammi Naler (47)	Unknown	Cross County, Arkansas	
2023-09-26	Homero Carrillo (22)	Latino	Lubbock, Texas	An officer was called to a vehicle that was previously reported as stolen. When the officer located the vehicle, the man reportedly exited from the driver’s side and began running on-foot. The responding officer chased the man and attempted to taser him, but failed to attack the suspect. The man and the officer both pulled out their pistols, and the officer fired several times, fatally injuring him on-scene.
2023-09-26	Darmon Graves Jr. (42)	Unknown	Indianapolis, Indiana	Both the Indiana State Police and the Indianapolis Metropolitan Police Department replied that a local man, who was out on bond, got out of a car and attempted to shoot at investigators near the Fairgrounds area. Officers returned fire, fatally injuring him. According to court records, the man got out of prison in 2021, serving time after being convicted for shooting a man during a robbery.
2023-09-25	Nicolas Avila (24)	Latino	Miami, Florida	Miami-Dade officers respond to a report of a carjacking at the 6th floor of a parking structure, where a male victim had his Nissan taken from him. Three people were in the car when officers located the vehicle a few miles away. They surrounded the vehicle, but when officers tried to stop it, one suspect inside the car began to shoot at officers, and then drove off. The pursuit ended with a fatal crash after the driver lost control of the vehicle, killing the shooter.
2023-09-24	Tiffany McCoy (32)	Latino	Temple, Texas	
2023-09-24	Michael Shirley (55)	White	Dallas, Texas	A stolen vehicle standoff with Dallas Police officers and a 55-year-old man with an extensive criminal history turned into a pursuit when the man pulled out a revolver from a shoulder holster and drove off in a stolen white Cadillac SRX near the Casa View neighborhood. The vehicle hit a curb, overturned to its side, and the suspect returned fire before getting fatally shot by officers.
2023-09-24	Jorge Ramirez-Rivera (45)	Latino	Oak Ridge, Florida	Orange County deputies responded to report of a man shooting his gun at the backyard in Oak Ridge, pointing a gun at passing drivers, and threatening his roommate with the gun. When deputies arrived, they tried for about 40 minutes to negotiate with the man, but the man went outside at his backyard. Officers used less-lethal tactics including a Taser, but he pulled a firearm from his waistband and fired one shot before an officer fatally shot the man in the back.
2023-09-24	Joel Castaneda (42)	Unknown	Mesa, Arizona	Officers responded to a burglary after a woman called 911 saying that her ex-boyfriend broke into her house. Castaneda was located in a nearby house and began firing at officers. One officer returned fire on the suspect, killing him on-scene.
2023-09-24	Bryon J. Brown (32)	Black	Little Rock, Arkansas	Brown died after an Arkansas State Police trooper performed a violent PIT maneuver on the suspect's 2006 BMW during a pursuit on Interstate 30 near mile marker 133, resulting in his death.
2023-09-23	Kaena Kaohu (30)	Unknown	Keaau, Hawaii	While searching for a man accused of making terroristic threats between two of his brothers, officers spotted the suspect in a house, but took off on foot. The man ran into a heavily wooded area and began firing at officers. Officers returned fire and fatally struck the suspect.
2023-09-23	Brian Spencer (43)	White	Cross Lanes, West Virginia	A 43-year-old man from Sissonville, West Virginia with an active arrest warrant out of Logan County was shot and killed by deputies after he allegedly fired at them from his vehicle near the Rodeway Inn in Cross Lanes.
2023-09-22	Larry Harvey III (45)	White	Sherman, Texas	The 45-year-old former restaurant employee and longtime Sherman resident, who had an extensive criminal history in Grayson County dating back to the late 1990s, robbed the First United Bank. Police were able to track down the suspect at the Veterans of Foreign Wars Post #2772. A male witness called 911 saying that the man had cut their phone lines and had a weapon. After officers arrived on-scene, the man pulled out a weapon, but an officer fired first, killing him instantly.
2023-09-22	Oscar Maxwell (22)	Black	Columbus, Georgia	Muscogee County deputies responded to the Baymont Hotel after a man was wanted on multiple felony warrants, including several firearm thefts. The man engaged with deputies but went back inside his room. Officers opened the door, the man started shooting at officers, and officers opened fire back. During a brief pause, deputies gave the man verbal commands before the man opened fire again at parked vehicles. Officers returned fire, fatally shooting the man to death as confirmed by a wireless robot.
2023-09-22	Ricketz Williams (27)	Unknown	Indianapolis, Indiana	Three Indianapolis police officers were placed on administrative leave after assassinating the man during a standoff. Police reported that the man also shot a female victim outside Lucas Oil Stadium who later recovered.
2023-09-22	unidentified male (50)	Unknown	Morongo Indian Reservation, California	Police responded to a report of a dead body at a house. Upon arrival, they were confronted by an armed resident and an officer-involved shooting occurred involving a Morongo Tribal Police officer.
2023-09-21	Ivan Solis Mora (33-34)	Latino	Inglewood, California	A 33-year-old Inglewood man diagnosed with schizophrenia was shot dead by police after charging towards an officer with a stick that had a knife on one end.
2023-09-21	Lamar Walker (24)	Black	Berkeley, California	A female victim was working at the Toyota of Berkeley Certified Service Center when she was approached by a man. The man opened fire on the victim, fatally wounding the worker, before fleeing. After evacuating the scene and searching for potential victims, Berkeley police officers found the man crouched down by a desk in an office, pointing a silver revolver at the entryway where police were entering from. The man tried to attempt suicide before police arrived but was unsuccessful. Officer later found the suspect before shooting him to death on scene.
2023-09-21	Katherine Colon (40)	Latino	New Britain, Connecticut	A police officer driving to a burglary call struck Colon as she crossed the street.
2023-09-20	Dimitri Humphrey (26)	Black	Houston, Texas	A 26-year-old Houston murderer, who murdered a female victim during a domestic dispute the previous week, arrived at the Riverside Park area, got out of a Jeep, and sat on a playground slide. Surveillance officers shot him when he started to fire his gun.
2023-09-20	Abel Valensia (43)	Latino	Hesperia, California	Officers were called to a burglary report that was confirmed as a false call. Officers confronted the man wearing a mask and carrying a BB gun before he was fatally shot by officers. One deputy was taken to a nearby hospital with minor injuries. The false 911 call reported that Valensia was locked in his closet, claiming that several armed men had entered the residence.
2023-09-20	Alejandro Faudoa	Unknown	Stroud, Oklahoma	An Oklahoma Highway Patrol trooper pulled over a semi-truck, operated by K&F Trucking of Oxford, North Carolina, without a trailer on Interstate 44 near mile-marker 183 because of a front plate lack. The trooper took Faudoa back to his vehicle to question him and made several observations leading him to believe the truck driver was involved in some criminal activity. Reporting that the man was placed "out of service" as a driver, the trooper told a K9 unit was coming to meet them to search the truck. The trooper said he asked to search the truck himself before requesting the K9 unit, but Faudoa refused to let him. Once Faudoa realized a K9 unit was coming, he exited the trooper's vehicle and ran toward his truck, attempting to flee. While the truck was moving slowly, the officer shot the suspect, killing him instantly.
2023-09-19	Eric Taylor (36)	Black	Indianapolis, Indiana	Officers respond to a report of a suicidal man threatening to kill his ex-girlfriend and children. A female victim told police that the man won't stop following her when she left her home. Officers located the man in his vehicle nearby and tried to pull over. The traffic stop attempt turned into a brief pursuit that ended with the man stepping out, grabbing a handgun, and demanding a "suicide by cop". The officer opened fire on the suspect after ordering him to drop the weapon, killing him on-scene.
2023-09-19	Brian Shumway (36)	White	Marietta, South Carolina	A 36-year-old Shreveport, Louisiana man was shot and killed by South Carolina Highway Patrol after a traffic stop in Greenville County turned into a long pursuit that traveled through two counties. The pursuit ended in Pickens County with a crash and a shootout with the trooper in Marietta, who fired back, striking and killing the man on-scene.
2023-09-18	Cesar Armando Aguirre (49)	Latino	Donna, Texas	Officers responded to an intoxicated subject discharging his firearm multiple times inside his residence. The man was shot dead by officers following an hours-long barricade.
2023-09-17	Jesus Hernandez (46)	Unknown	San Antonio, Texas	A San Antonio officer was placed on administrative leave after fatally shooting a man armed with a large welded knife and a firearm and chasing the suspect around an apartment complex. Police reported that the man was involved in an armed robbery before the killing.
2023-09-17	Reginal Owens (41)	Black	Woodville, Texas	Officers respond to a call involving a suspicious man causing a disturbance in his white truck. One officer attempted to make contact with a Jasper, Texas man who lived in Hemphill at the time, but fled. A short pursuit through multiple residential streets led into a blockage into a private driveway. After a short reverse, Owens approached the driver’s side of the pickup and shot an officer before fleeing the scene again. Owens fled on foot while holding his gun afterward. Deputies gave him multiple orders to stand down, which Owens ignored, before being shot and killed afterward. The officer was airlifted to a nearby hospital in stable condition.
2023-09-17	Nathan Wood (28)	White	Johnstown, New York	A man from Bleecker, New York entered an apartment with permission from the tenant. The male property owner who lives downstairs demanded Wood leave before the victim was hit several times with a hammer. The victim suffered inflicted serious wounds. A Johnstown officer was called to the home and confronted Wood who reportedly ignored the officer's commands. The man struck him with the hammer before the officer fatally shot him. The owner of the property and the officer were treated at the hospital for injuries troopers described as non-life-threatening.
2023-09-17	William Burrell Nelson (43)	Latino	Hoopa, California	CHP officers spotted a gray Volkswagen Jetta on California State Route 96. Officers tried to pull him over for a broken windshield, but was later turned out to be that the driver of the vehicle was not wearing a seatbelt and the vehicle’s lights were not operating properly. The man failed to yield for a quarter of a mile before fleeing on foot nearly 200 yards away. One officer deployed a taser, tasering him, before another officer shot the suspect, killing him on-scene. His death sparked outrage across the area.
2023-09-15	Matthew Edward Healey (57)	White	Greenville, South Carolina	A man was killed by officers at a nightclub parking lot in a "multiple weapons" call during the midnight hours.
2023-09-15	Michael Pinto (40)	White	Providence, Rhode Island	Police shot and killed the 40-year-old Glocester, Rhode Island man outside the Woman & Infants Hospital after he reversed his vehicle towards a Burrillville officer and a nurse. Pinto's teenage daughter, who was also in the vehicle, was shot in the leg and injured.
2023-09-14	Sterling Keyon Arnold (43)	Black	Huntsville, Alabama	A man was shot by officers after officers respond to a shots fired call in the downtown area of Huntsville.
2023-09-14	Robert Seiber (28)	Latino	West End, North Carolina	
2023-09-13	Shay McKenna (28)	White	Rangeley Plantation, Maine	A man, who was charged with manslaughter in connection on the death of his brother, was shot and killed by deputies after exiting a van while wearing a ballistic vest and holding a rifle.
2023-09-13	Carlos Deanda (35)	Latino	Los Angeles, California	Officers from LAPD's Olympic Division fatally shot a man during a confrontation near the Pico-Union area after responding to multiple calls of a man armed with a knife, causing a disturbance, and an assault with a deadly weapon.
2023-09-12	Raheem Freeman (28)	Unknown	Roswell, Georgia	Officers from Roswell's SWAT team fatally shot an armed man during a nearly three-hour standoff at a RaceTrac gas station. When SWAT officers entered the convenience store, the man began opening fire on officers, but officers returned fire, fatally killing the man.
2023-09-12	Cleavon Miles (36)	Black	Sacramento, California	
2023-09-12	Angelo Curcione (55)	Unknown	Auburndale, Florida	A 55-year-old man, who had an extensive criminal history dating back to 1986, was shot and killed in a "suicide-by-cop" incident following a domestic violence call. Officers spotted the man hiding in the bushes with a knife after stealing a bicycle. After jumping out of the bushes, the suspect told the officers to shoot him. Three officers fatally shot the man, killing him on-scene.
2023-09-12	Sidney Dotson (37)	Black	McKinney, Texas	Officers respond to a parking lot after reporting a man making suicidal threats. The man continued to make threats after officers arrived and "ignored multiple commands to drop the weapons" as the responding officers attempted to deescalate the situation. Dotson then charged at officers with a knife he was carrying. Officers then shot Dotson and began providing "life-saving measures" until the fire department came to transport him to the hospital, where he was pronounced deceased.
2023-09-11	Nathan Liverpool (22)	Black	Forest Park, Georgia	A man robbed a silver Chevrolet Malibu at gunpoint from a female victim. He drove a few blocks away before attempting to turn into a parking lot and crashed into a semi-truck. The man attempted to rob the semi-truck at gunpoint but left. Officers spotted the man walking down the road carrying two firearms. After confronting by officers ordering him to drop the weapons, the man began firing. Officers fired back, fatally striking the man.
2023-09-11	Jory Lester (34)	Unknown	Stockton, California	Police responded to a report of a man attempting to burglarize a home by kicking a door and climbing through a window at a Red Roof Inn. When officers confronted the suspect, the man took off with a rifle. After a brief getaway, police spotted the man hiding behind a bridge pillar on Interstate 5. The suspect walked past the officers and opened fire on them. Officers fought back, fatally shooting the man.
2023-09-10	Matthew Johnson (27)	White	Omaha, Nebraska	Three officers shot a man after waving a gun at a person driving by and then pointed his weapon at officers near Spyglass Hill.
2023-09-10	Lamoris Dejuan Speight, Jr. (22)	Black	Saratoga, North Carolina	A man was shot and killed during an altercation with a Wilson County deputy.
2023-09-10	unidentified female	Unknown	Prescott, Arizona	
2023-09-10	David Maynard (54)	White	Ceredo, West Virginia	A man suspected of murdering his 78 year old stepfather in Ironton, Ohio the previous day and multiple carjackings took three hostages at a Speedway gas station in Ceredo, West Virginia. Police shot and killed Maynard after two of the hostages were released and the third was secured after the event took place. The hostages were unharmed.
2023-09-09	unidentified male(22)	Unknown	New York City, New York	NYPD officers from the 45th Precinct arrived at a 7-Eleven in the Throggs Neck neighborhood of the Bronx following an altercation between a man and an employee. Officers tried to engage the suspect but the man pulled out a kitchen knife and lunged at officers. An officer withdrew his firearm, fatally shooting him in the torso.
2023-09-09	Phillip Henault (64)	White	Hancock, Massachusetts	A local man was shot and killed by police after running from an officer. Police reported that he had "multiple knives" recovered.
2023-09-09	Robert Crockett (26)	White	Glendale, Arizona	A man carjacked a rideshare worker in nearby Phoenix before officers tracked the suspect at his home in Glendale. When police arrived, the man's wife was escorted by police, while the man walked out of his house and began pointing a firearm at officers. Officers shot the suspect, killing him on-scene.
2023-09-09	Robert Logan (23)	White	Mariposa, California	Police responded to a report of a stabbing after a man stabbed another man who was staying in the suspect's home. When an officer arrived on-scene, the suspect walked towards the deputy and ignored commands delivered by the officer. While the man continued to walk towards the deputy armed with a knife, the officer fired one round at the man, fatally killing him on-scene.
2023-09-08	Quentin Hill (32)	Black	Lake City, Florida	
2023-09-08	unidentified male	Unknown	Beckley, West Virginia	A man was shot and killed by police after opening fire on an officer in his vehicle. The deputy was treated at a nearby hospital with non-life-threatening injuries.
2023-09-07	Christoffer Huffman (41)	White	Star, Idaho	Died from a gunshot to the chest.
2023-09-07	Tyran Meirow (42)	Unknown	Rockaway Beach, Oregon	Police responded to a report of erratic behavior from a man who won't stop screaming and destroying things. Officers tried to altercate the suspect by entering the house by telling him to stay away from the house before officers from both Tillamook County and Oregon State Police opened fire on the suspect, killing him from a single gunshot wound.
2023-09-07	Ryan Herinckx (39)	White	Hillsboro, Oregon	Officers obtained a search warrant authorizing them to search the man's house and arrest him. While officers searched through his house, the man left while officers continued to serve the warrant. Armed with a gun, officers caught the man pointing the gun at officers, and officers opened fire on the man, killing him.
2023-09-07	Richard Sonnier Jr (38)	Latino	Rayne, Louisiana	
2023-09-07	unidentified male	Unknown	Mendenhall, Mississippi	
2023-09-07	Xion Xang Dunn (35)	Black	Wrens, Georgia	
2023-09-07	unidentified male(41)	Unknown	Fort Hall, Idaho	
2023-09-07	Alexis White (23)	White	Orange Beach, Alabama	A sheriff's deputy in Cullman County, Alabama shot and killed White, his girlfriend and a dispatcher at the department, before killing himself.
2023-09-06	Jamal Walker (39)	Black	Lexington, South Carolina	
2023-09-06	Antonio Lacunas-Escobar (37)	Unknown	Hayward, California	Two officers shot and killed an armed man outside a Safeway store during the overnight hours. Police reported that the man was armed with a BB pistol and suspected of trying to shoplift. Officers mistook the BB pistol as a handgun.
2023-09-06	Johnny J. Angel (53)	Unknown	Rialto, California	Officers from the Chino Police Department shot and killed a Rancho Cucamonga man near his Rialto residence after officers tried to pull over his blue 1996 BMW Z3 for a seatbelt violation that lead into a crosstown pursuit. According to law enforcement, the pursuit started after he caused a motorcycle officer to collide with the back of his car by slamming on the brakes.
2023-09-06	Lueth Mo (15)	Black	DeWitt, New York	
2023-09-06	Dhal Pothwi (17)	Black	DeWitt, New York	
2023-09-05	Dontae Warner (30)	Unknown	Irwin, Pennsylvania	A McKeesport, Pennsylvania man was killed inside his vehicle by law enforcement at a parking lot behind the Huntingdon Inn Motel. Police reported that he accelerated his vehicle and attempted to ram into police vehicles after officers gave commands to get out of his car.
2023-09-04	Jacob String (27)	Latino	San Antonio, Texas	A man was killed by law enforcement after drawing a gun from his waistband and pointed it toward officers on the Southeast Side. Police reported that the man had been released a few months prior on bond for an offense of evading arrest with a vehicle and had been wanted on multiple aggravated robbery warrants.
2023-09-04	Sherman Crutcher (37)	Latino	Reno, Nevada	Officers responded to a fatal stabbing of a 16-year-old boy who police believed was the suspect's son. The caller told police the suspect was high on drugs and armed with a knife. After officers arrived, the man, who was suicidal and covered in blood, exited the house with the knife held over his head in a threatening manner. Two officers opened fire on the suspect after disobeying police, killing him instantly.
2023-09-04	Robert Boozer (42)	Unknown	Hacienda Heights, California	Officers responded to a fatal stabbing of the suspect's 69-year-old father at his home in Hacienda Heights. Right after arrival, deputies immediately opened fire on his 42-year-old son from St. George, Utah, killing him.
2023-09-04	Michael Wilson (46)	Unknown	Clayton, Oklahoma	A man was killed by law enforcement after being barricaded inside his apartment. Officers attempted to negotiate with him for several hours but never responded. The man opened fire on officers while they attempted to enter the apartment. Officers returned fire, killing him.
2023-09-04	Leon Minniefield Jr. (55)	Black	Waco, Texas	A man was killed by law enforcement after walking out a house with two weapons. Deputies returned fire, killing him. The suspect was also accused of injuring three people in a nearby shooting.
2023-09-04	Joshua Walker (32)	White	Bartow, Florida	A man was shot and killed by officers after allegedly took off on foot and pointed a gun at them after being accused of carjacking a couple and ramming the stolen vehicle into three other cars in nearby Highlands City, Florida.
2023-09-03	Bradley Hatcher (39)	White	Grenada, Mississippi	An almost four-hour standoff at a local Walgreens turned into tragic when a man holding hostages was shot and killed by law enforcement. All the hostages are reported safe following the incident.
2023-09-03	George Appleby (59)	Unknown	Alliance, Ohio	
2023-09-02	Stephon Ford (17)	Black	Jonesboro, Georgia	The Jonesboro Police Department was responding to suspicious activity involving three males at a hotel. Two of the males were arrested but Ford fled. At some point Ford was located hiding in a wooded area close by. Officers allegedly gave Ford commands to surrender. Ford then allegedly pulled out a handgun and began firing, striking a K-9 in the back. The dog later succumbed to its injuries at an animal hospital. Hours later, officers located the Ford again within the same area and allegedly gave him commands to drop his gun. Ford was then shot and killed when he allegedly pointed his firearm in the direction of officers.
2023-09-02	David Lopez (17)	Unknown	Chattanooga, Tennessee	The boy was shot and killed by law enforcement after being armed with a handgun and refused to comply with verbal commands to exit the residence that ended with an escalation.
2023-09-02	Louis Earl Johnson Jr. (30)	White	Longview, Washington	A Seattle man was killed by law enforcement after firing a "ghost gun" at police during a pursuit. Police reported that it started with a 911 call involving the man passed out in an orange Dodge Challenger at a parking lot leading to a Teriyaki restaurant.
2023-09-01	Jaylen Routt (20)	Black	Raleigh, North Carolina	Routt died after he allegedly shot at North Carolina State Highway Patrol troopers after a high speed, in which he was caused by Routt 101 mph in a 70 mph zone on Interstate 40. Routt was also wanted for the fatal shooting of 17-year-old Anthony Adams, which occurred in Fayetteville.
2023-09-01	Edward Garcia (51)	Unknown	Elmendorf, Texas	When Garcia fled a traffic stop, a high speed chase ensued on I-37. At some point Garcia lost control of his pickup truck, causing it to collided with a median. Garcia allegedly got out of the truck, rifle in hand, and starting shooting at officers, who shot and killed him in return.
2023-09-01	Daryl Vance (71)	Black	Detroit, Michigan	An officer responding to a disorderly conduct call at a bowling alley struck Vance in the face, causing him to fall and hit his head. Vance was hospitalized and died of his injuries several weeks later, his death ruled a homicide. The officer who struck Vance was fired and charged with manslaughter.

== See also ==
- Death in custody § United States
- Henry A. Wallace Police Crime Public Database
- List of cases of police brutality
- List of countries with annual rates and counts for killings by law enforcement officers
- List of law enforcement officers killed in the line of duty in the United States
- List of law enforcement officers convicted for an on-duty killing in the United States
- List of shootings by US immigration agents
- List of police reforms related to the George Floyd protests
- List of unarmed African Americans killed by law enforcement officers in the United States
- Lists of killings by law enforcement officers
- Police brutality in the United States
- Police misconduct § United States
- Police riot § United States
- Police use of deadly force in the United States
