= Chase Lake (Fulton County, New York) =

- Location within New York Location within the United States
- Location: Fulton County, New York, United States
- Coordinates: 43°13′1.02″N 74°21′32.53″W
- Type: Lake
- Primary outflows: Chase Lake Outlet
- Basin countries: United States
- Surface area: 64 acres (0.26 km^{2})
- Average depth: 10 feet (3.0 m)
- Max. depth: 26 feet (7.9 m)
- Shore length^{1}: 1.7 miles (2.7 km)
- Surface elevation: 1,450 feet (440 m)
- Settlements: Pinnacle, New York
- ^{1} Shore length is not a well-defined measure.

Chase Lake is located north of Pinnacle, New York. Fish species present in the lake are pickerel, white sucker, yellow perch, pumpkinseed sunfish, common carp, largemouth bass and brown bullhead. There is access by trail from Pinnacle Road on the southwest shore.
