= Killing of Eddie Irizarry =

2023 police killing

- Location: Philadelphia, Pennsylvania, U.S.
- Date: August 14, 2023; 3 years ago
- Attack type: Homicide by shooting, police brutality, manslaughter
- Victims: Eddie Irizarry, aged 27
- Perpetrator: Mark Dial
- Charges: Third-degree murder; Voluntary manslaughter; Possession of an instrument of crime; Recklessly endangering another person; Official oppression
- Verdict: Not guilty of third-degree murder and official oppression; Guilty on remaining counts
- Sentence: Time served; immediate parole following sentencing

On August 14, 2023, Eddie Irizarry, a 27-year-old Puerto Rican man, was shot to death in Philadelphia by Mark Dial, a white police officer.

Later on August 14, Philadelphia police told the media that the incident began when officers pulled over a car that was "driving erratically" and the wrong way on a one way street, then as "officers approached" the car, they incorrectly stated that Irizarry "stepped out" of the car "with a knife", which the "officers gave multiple commands for him to drop", but Irizarry "lunged at the officers", prompting the shooting. On August 15, Philadelphia police changed their story, stating that Irizarry was actually in the car when he was shot. It was revealed through body camera footage that Dial had screamed "I will fucking shoot you!" while charging towards Irizarry's car. Philadelphia Police Commissioner Danielle Outlaw stated that officers' body-worn camera footage "made it very clear that what we initially reported was not actually what happened."

On May 22, 2025, Dial was found guilty of the manslaughter of Irizarry and other charges. He was acquitted of murder and official oppression. On July 17, 2025, Dial was granted immediate parole following sentencing.

== Legal proceedings ==
On September 8, 2023, Mark Dial – who fired the fatal shots, was charged with first-degree murder, third-degree murder, voluntary manslaughter, aggravated assault, simple assault, reckless endangerment of another person, and official oppression. Body camera footage of the incident, released on September 8, showed Dial running to Irizarry's car and shouting "I will fucking shoot you!" around five to seven seconds before Dial fired six gunshots into Irizarry's car immediately upon approaching Irizarry's vehicle, followed by Dial and his Partner dragging Irizarry's lifeless body to the police car. It was reported that Irizarry had a knife by his right leg while in his car, though this was not visible to Dial. Dial's lawyer has said that Dial fired because he thought Irizarry was pointing a gun at him, while CNN reported that "body camera videos of the shooting do not appear to show Irizarry with a gun". On September 20, 2023, Dial's bail was revoked.

On September 26, the judge overseeing the case, Municipal Court Judge Wendy L. Pew, dismissed all charges against Dial, but charges were refiled hours later. On October 25, upon appeal by prosecutors, all charges, including first-degree murder, were reinstated by State Judge Lillian Ransom, and Dial was taken back into custody without bail.

On August 8, 2024, the first-degree murder charge specifically was dropped and Dial was released on bail.

On May 22, 2025, Dial was found guilty of voluntary manslaughter, possession of an instrument of crime, and recklessly endangering another person. He was found not guilty of third-degree murder and official oppression. Dial faced up to 20 years in prison. On July 17, 2025, Dial given a sentence of nine-and-a-half months to two years in prison. However, since Dial had already spent several months in jail, he was granted immediate parole following sentencing. Dial was given one-and-a-half years less than the typical sentence for his convictions. Philadelphia District Attorney Larry Krasner stated he was "deeply disappointed" by the sentencing.

== See also ==
- Killing of Dhal Apet and Lueth Mo
- List of killings by law enforcement officers in the United States, August 2023
