= Killing of Ta'Kiya Young =

2023 police killing in Blendon Township, Ohio

- Ta'Kiya Young, depicted in an undated photo.
- Date: August 24, 2023
- Location: Blendon Township, Ohio, U.S.
- Type: Homicide by shooting, police killing
- Participants: 3
- Deaths: Young and her unborn child
- Inquiries: Ohio Bureau of Criminal Investigation
- Accused: Connor Grubb
- Charges: Murder (2 counts); Involuntary manslaughter (2 counts); Felonious assault (2 counts)
- Verdict: Not guilty (all counts)

Surveillance video shows Ta’Kiya shoplifting bottles of alcohol before being fatally shot by police

On August 24, 2023, Ta'Kiya Young, a pregnant 21-year-old woman, was shot to death by police officer Connor Grubb in Blendon Township, Ohio after she slowly rolled her vehicle into him. Grubb was standing in front of the vehicle at the time. Young's unborn child did not survive. The killing occurred after Young refused police instructions to exit her vehicle following accusations of her shoplifting liquor from a Kroger store.

On August 13, 2024, Grubb was charged with murder, manslaughter, and assault. His trial began on November 5, 2025. On November 21, 2025, Grubb was found not guilty on all charges.

== Background ==
Ta'Kiya Young was a 21-year-old mother of two young sons, aged 6 and 3 at the time of her death; she was pregnant with a due date of November 2023.

Ohio officials continually cite Marsy's Law, which requires that police withhold the names of victims of violent crimes, to explain limited release of details related to police shootings. According to The Marshall Project, law enforcement agencies in several states have increasingly used victims' rights statutes to shield the identities of officers involved in deadly use-of-force incidents, a trend that has been criticized by advocates of open governance and transparency.

The Blendon Township police use-of-force policy provides that officers should try to move away from an approaching vehicle instead of firing their weapons.

== Death ==
Young was sitting in her car outside a Kroger grocery store around 6:30 pm when a store staff member approached nearby police and told them that Young had stolen alcohol from the store. Young was sitting in a four-door Lexus sedan that did not have a license plate and was parked in a handicap spot. Two police officers approached the car and demanded several times that Young exit the vehicle. One officer stood near the driver's door and another stood in front of the vehicle, with his gun drawn. Young remained behind the wheel and told the officers that she did not steal anything.

After about five minutes Young put on a turn signal and struck officer Connor Grubb with her vehicle. Connor Grubb then fired one shot through the windshield, killing Young and her unborn baby. As the deceased Young's car began swerving after the shooting, the police began yelling, "Stop the goddamn car!" A passerby who was an emergency room doctor gave medical assistance until paramedics arrived and transported Young to the hospital where she and her unborn child were declared dead.

== Aftermath ==
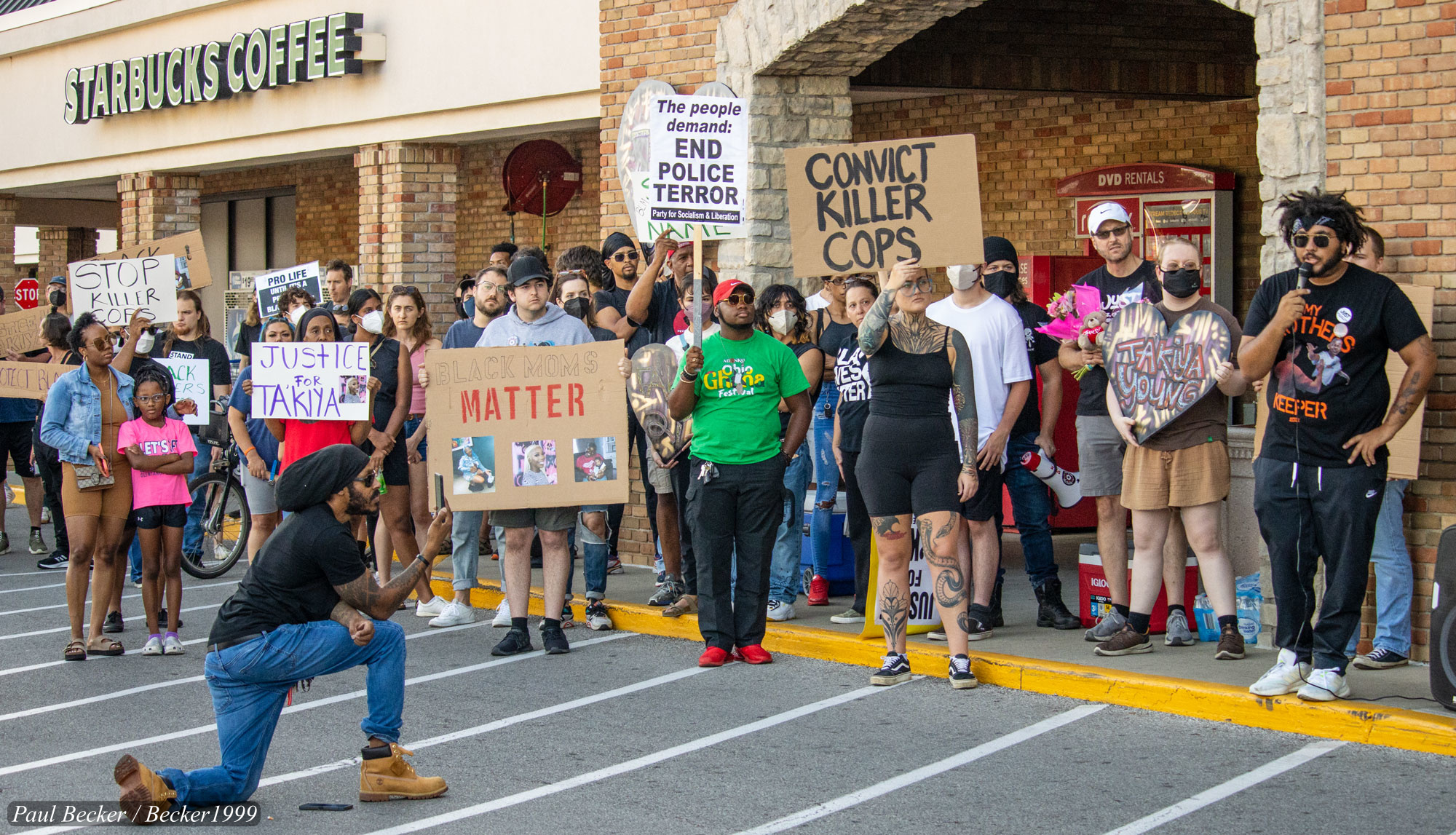
Protest at the site of the shooting.

Two officers, who were not publicly identified prior to August 2024, were involved in the shooting. Blendon Township cited Marsy's Law for not releasing the names of the officers. Police considered the officer who shot Young to be a potential victim of attempted vehicular assault, as he was hit by the vehicle. Police considered the other officer a potential victim of misdemeanor assault, as his arm was inside the car window when Young accelerated. Blendon Township Police Department also did not disclose for how many years each officer had worked, as it considered years of service to be an identifying marker due to the department's small size.

Both of the officers were placed on paid administrative leave after the shooting, although the officer who did not fire his gun has since returned to duty. The Ohio Bureau of Criminal Investigation is investigating the shooting.

On October 4, 2023, it was announced that Young and her unborn child's deaths had been ruled as homicides, and that the case would be presented to a grand jury to decide whether to bring charges to the officer who fired at Young. In December 2023, it was announced that a special prosecutor had been appointed to determine charges, if any, in the case.

== Trial ==
On August 13, 2024, nearly a year after the killing, Grubb was indicted by a grand jury with four counts of murder, four counts of felonious assault, and two counts of involuntary manslaughter. Grubb was arraigned on August 14 and pleaded not guilty. If convicted of murder, Grubb would face a minimum of 15 years in prison and a maximum of life with the possibility of parole after 25 years.

Grubb's trial began on November 5, 2025. On November 18, 2025, two counts of murder and two counts of felonious assault related to the death of Young's unborn child were dismissed.

On November 21, Grubb was found not guilty by a jury of his peers on all remaining charges.

== Response ==
Attorneys for Young's family demanded a swift indictment of the officer responsible for the killings of Young and her unborn daughter. Young's family held a candlelight vigil the day after the shooting outside of her grandmother's home to honor Young and her unborn baby.

Blendon Township Chief of Police John Belford called the shooting a "tragic situation for everyone". In response to the incident, a member of the Fraternal Order of Police said that "A weapon is not just a firearm. A weapon is also a 2,000-pound vehicle that somebody puts into gear and is driving at you."

== See also ==
- List of killings by law enforcement officers in the United States, August 2023
- List of unarmed African Americans killed by law enforcement officers in the United States
- Lists of killings by law enforcement officers in the United States
- Murder of Sonya Massey
- Killing of Atatiana Jefferson
- Killing of Breonna Taylor
- Killing of Tyisha Miller
