= West Caroga Lake =

Lake in the U.S. state of New York

- Location within New York West Caroga Lake (the United States)
- Location: Fulton County, New York, United States
- Coordinates: 43°08′13″N 74°29′44″W
- Primary inflows: Mead Creek
- Primary outflows: East Caroga Lake
- Basin countries: United States
- Surface area: 275 acres (1.11 km^{2})
- Average depth: 13 feet (4.0 m)
- Max. depth: 74 feet (23 m)
- Shore length^{1}: 3 miles (4.8 km)
- Surface elevation: 1,453 feet (443 m)
- Settlements: Caroga Lake, New York
- ^{1} Shore length is not a well-defined measure.

West Caroga Lake is located in the Town of Caroga by Caroga Lake, New York. The lake is known for excellent warm water fishing, but it also offers the only location to fish for splake in the county. The lake is connected to East Caroga Lake by a small channel. Origin of the name, "Caroga" is derived from the once nearby Indian Village known as "Caroga".

== Fishing ==
Fish found within this lake include smallmouth bass, lake whitefish, atlantic salmon, white sucker, rainbow trout, rock bass, landlocked salmon, chain pickerel, brown bullhead, yellow perch, pumpkinseed sunfish, and splake. Anglers have the opportunity to fish for warm water species and trout because of the unique contour of lake. Rainbow trout have also been known to enter into West Caroga Lake through the channel from East Caroga Lake.
