= Caroga Creek =

- Location of the mouth of Caroga Creek Caroga Creek (the United States)

Location
- Country: United States
- State: New York
- Regions: Adirondacks, Central New York
- Counties: Fulton, Montgomery

Physical characteristics
- Source: East Caroga Lake
  - location: Caroga
  - coordinates: 43°07′31″N 74°29′57″W
  - elevation: 1,450 ft (440 m)
- Mouth: Mohawk River
  - location: Palatine Church, New York
  - coordinates: 42°57′52″N 74°38′15″W
  - elevation: 305 ft (93 m)
- Basin size: 88.2 sq mi (228 km^{2})

Basin features
- Tributaries
  - left: Peck Creek, Sprite Creek, Mill Creek
  - right: Glasgow Creek, North Creek

Caroga Creek is a river in Fulton and Montgomery counties in the U.S. State of New York. It begins at East Caroga Lake and flows south passing through Rockwood Lake before converging with the Mohawk River in the Hamlet of Palatine Church.

== Fishing ==
Suckers can be speared and taken from the section of the creek within Montgomery County from January 1 to May 15, each year. Suckers can also be snagged in the portion within Fulton County between January 1 and May 15, each year.
