= East Caroga Lake =

Lake in the U.S. state of New York

- Location within New York East Caroga Lake (the United States)
- Location: Fulton County, New York, United States
- Coordinates: 43°07′41″N 074°28′51″W
- Primary inflows: West Caroga Lake
- Primary outflows: Caroga Creek
- Basin countries: United States
- Surface area: 198 acres (0.80 km^{2})
- Average depth: 13 feet (4.0 m)
- Max. depth: 48 feet (15 m)
- Shore length^{1}: 5.1 miles (8.2 km)
- Surface elevation: 1,450 feet (440 m)
- Settlements: Caroga Lake, New York
- ^{1} Shore length is not a well-defined measure.

East Caroga Lake is located in the Town of Caroga by Caroga Lake, New York. The lake provides excellent warm water fishing and rainbow trout fishing. The lake is connected to West Caroga Lake by a small channel. Origin of the name, "Caroga" is derived from the once nearby Indian Village known as "Caroga".

== Fishing ==
Fish found within East Caroga Lake include white sucker, rainbow trout, rock bass, chain pickerel, brown bullhead, yellow perch, pumpkinseed sunfish, and smallmouth bass. There is access via a beach launch in the NYSDEC campground on NY-29A, 9 miles (14 km) northwest of Gloversville, New York. There are boat rentals available at the campground.
