= Killing of Johnny Hollman =

2023 police killing in Atlanta

- Date: August 10, 2023; 3 years ago
- Location: Atlanta, Georgia, U.S.
- Type: Homicide
- Deaths: 1 (Hollman)

Deacon Johnny Hollman Sr. was a 62-year-old man killed by Atlanta Police officer Kiran Kimbrough on August 10, 2023. This was later ruled justified and a grand jury returned no indictment on August 4, 2025.

== Events ==
After finishing bible study on the evening of August 10, Hollman got into a minor traffic accident. He called 911 and waited hours for police to arrive. The officer arriving on the scene found that Hollman was at fault in the accident and issued Hollman a citation. Hollman asked to see a sergeant, but the officer allegedly refused and threatened to arrest Hollman if he refused to sign the traffic ticket. Atlanta police have said that Hollman became "agitated and uncooperative" when he was given the citation and that he refused to sign it.

In September, Hollman's family organized a march in Atlanta demanding that body camera footage of the killing be released to the public.

In body camera footage of the altercation, Kimbrough used his taser on Deacon Hollman while Hollman repeatedly stated "I can't breathe". Hollman died less than two hours after the incident. An autopsy found that Hollman's death was a homicide.

== Aftermath ==
Kimbrough's lawyer has said that "The Atlanta Police investigation confirmed Officer Kimbrough deployed his city-issued TASER and used force in a manner consistent with his training and Georgia law." An official investigation found that Kimbrough violated the agency's standard operating procedures during the killing, and the officer was fired, although he did not face criminal charges. Kimbrough's lawyer said that the officer used his taser in accordance with his training and that Kimbrough is appealing his firing.

Hollman's death has contributed to opposition to the Atlanta Public Safety Training center (also known as "cop city") currently under construction in the city.

Atlanta police operating procedures have also been changed so that officers should write "refused to sign" on citations if people refuse to sign them instead of attempting arrest.
