= Bleecker, New York =

- Town
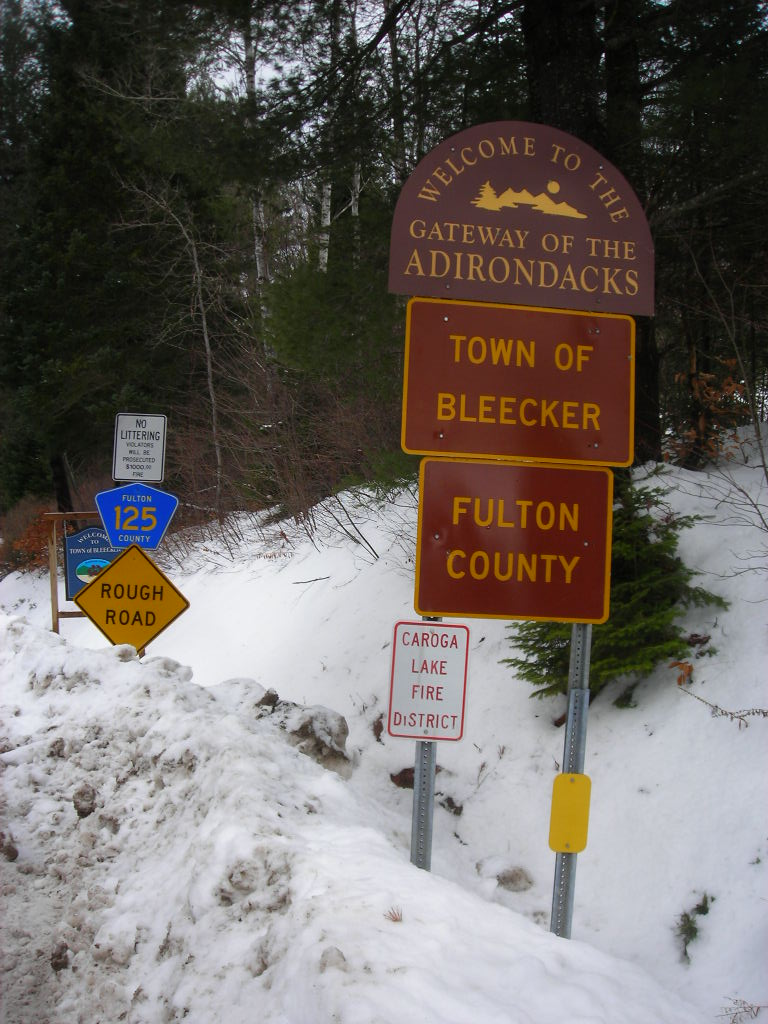
- Signage along County Route 125 entering the town of Bleecker and Fulton County

- Location within New York Location within the United States
- Coordinates: 43°9′29″N 74°23′21″W
- Country: United States
- State: New York
- County: Fulton

Government
  - Type: Town Council
  - Town Supervisor: David Howard (R)
  - Town Council: Members' List: • James E. Conboy (R); • Darren Smith (R); • David Bartholomew (R); • George J. Becker Jr. (I)

Area
  - Total: 59.41 sq mi (153.87 km^{2})
  - Land: 57.13 sq mi (147.96 km^{2})
  - Water: 2.29 sq mi (5.92 km^{2})
- Elevation: 1,417 ft (432 m)

Population (2010)
  - Total: 533
  - Estimate (2016): 504
  - Density: 8.8/sq mi (3.41/km^{2})
- Time zone: UTC-5 (Eastern (EST))
  - Summer (DST): UTC-4 (EDT)
- ZIP Codes: 12078 (Gloversville); 12134 (Northville)
- Area code: 518
- FIPS code: 36-035-06882
- GNIS feature ID: 0978737
- Website: www.townofbleecker.com

Bleecker is a town in Fulton County, New York, United States. The population was 545 at the 2020 census. The name is from Barent Bleecker, one of the original landowners of the region.

Bleecker is north of the cities of Gloversville and Johnstown, in the northern part of the county.

== History ==
The first permanent settlements began circa 1800 at Lindsleys Corners, although land sales took place before then.

The town was established in 1831 from part of the town of Johnstown, but did not arrive at its current dimensions until 1842. Part of Bleecker was returned to Johnstown in 1841, and another part was added to the town of Caroga in 1842.

Lumbering and tanning were important early industries. Around 1860 the maximum population, approximately 1,060, was attained; following this zenith, for decades it went into decline, though the community has grown since reaching a nadir of 190, a figure tabulated at the 1940 census.

== Geography ==
According to the United States Census Bureau, the town has a total area of 59.4 square miles (153.9 km^{2}), of which 57.1 square miles (148.0 km^{2}) is land and 2.3 square miles (5.9 km^{2}), or 3.85%, is water.

The northern town line is the border of Hamilton County. The town is inside the Adirondack Park.

== Demographics ==
Historical population
Census	Pop.	Note	%±
1840	346		—
1850	510		47.4%
1860	1,062		108.2%
1870	970		−8.7%
1880	1,046		7.8%
1890	816		−22.0%
1900	603		−26.1%
1910	500		−17.1%
1920	389		−22.2%
1930	202		−48.1%
1940	190		−5.9%
1950	220		15.8%
1960	245		11.4%
1970	294		20.0%
1980	463		57.5%
1990	515		11.2%
2000	573		11.3%
2010	533		−7.0%
2020	545		2.3%
U.S. Decennial Census

As of the census of 2000, there were 573 people, 232 households, and 173 families residing in the town. The population density was 10.0 inhabitants per square mile (3.9/km^{2}). There were 429 housing units at an average density of 7.5 per square mile (2.9/km^{2}). The racial makeup of the town was 98.08% White, 0.17% Native American, 0.87% Asian, 0.35% from other races, and 0.52% from two or more races. Hispanic or Latino of any race were 0.35% of the population.

There were 232 households, out of which 23.3% had children under the age of 18 living with them, 65.9% were married couples living together, 3.4% had a female householder with no husband present, and 25.4% were non-families. 16.8% of all households were made up of individuals, and 6.9% had someone living alone who was 65 years of age or older. The average household size was 2.47 and the average family size was 2.80.

In the town, the population was spread out, with 19.7% under the age of 18, 6.6% from 18 to 24, 23.6% from 25 to 44, 32.3% from 45 to 64, and 17.8% who were 65 years of age or older. The median age was 45 years. For every 100 females, there were 98.3 males. For every 100 females age 18 and over, there were 104.4 males.

The median income for a household in the town was $40,000, and the median income for a family was $43,333. Males had a median income of $31,875 versus $22,212 for females. The per capita income for the town was $19,851. About 3.8% of families and 4.2% of the population were below the poverty line, including none of those under age 18 and 5.5% of those age 65 or over.

== Communities and locations in Bleecker ==
- Bleecker – The hamlet of Bleecker in the southeastern part of the town on County Road 112.
- Bleecker Center – A hamlet northwest of Bleecker village on County Road 112.
- Bowlers Corners – A location south of Lindsley Corners, located on County Road 145.
- Chase Lake – A lake in the northeastern section of the town, named after an early settler, William Chase, who built the first grist mill.
- Lindsley Corners – A hamlet northeast of Bleecker village, located on County Road 125. The first house in Bleecker was purportedly constructed here.
- Mountain Lake – A small lake near the southern town line.
- Peck Lake – A large lake in the southwestern part of the town.
- Peters Corners – A hamlet north of Bleecker village, located on County Road 125.
- Pinnacle – A location east of Lindsley Corners; also the name of a mountain in the northwestern part of the town.
- Stony Creek – A stream flowing out the eastern side of Bleecker.
- Vandenburgh Pond – A small lake east of Bleecker village.
