= Canada Lake =

Lake in New York, United States

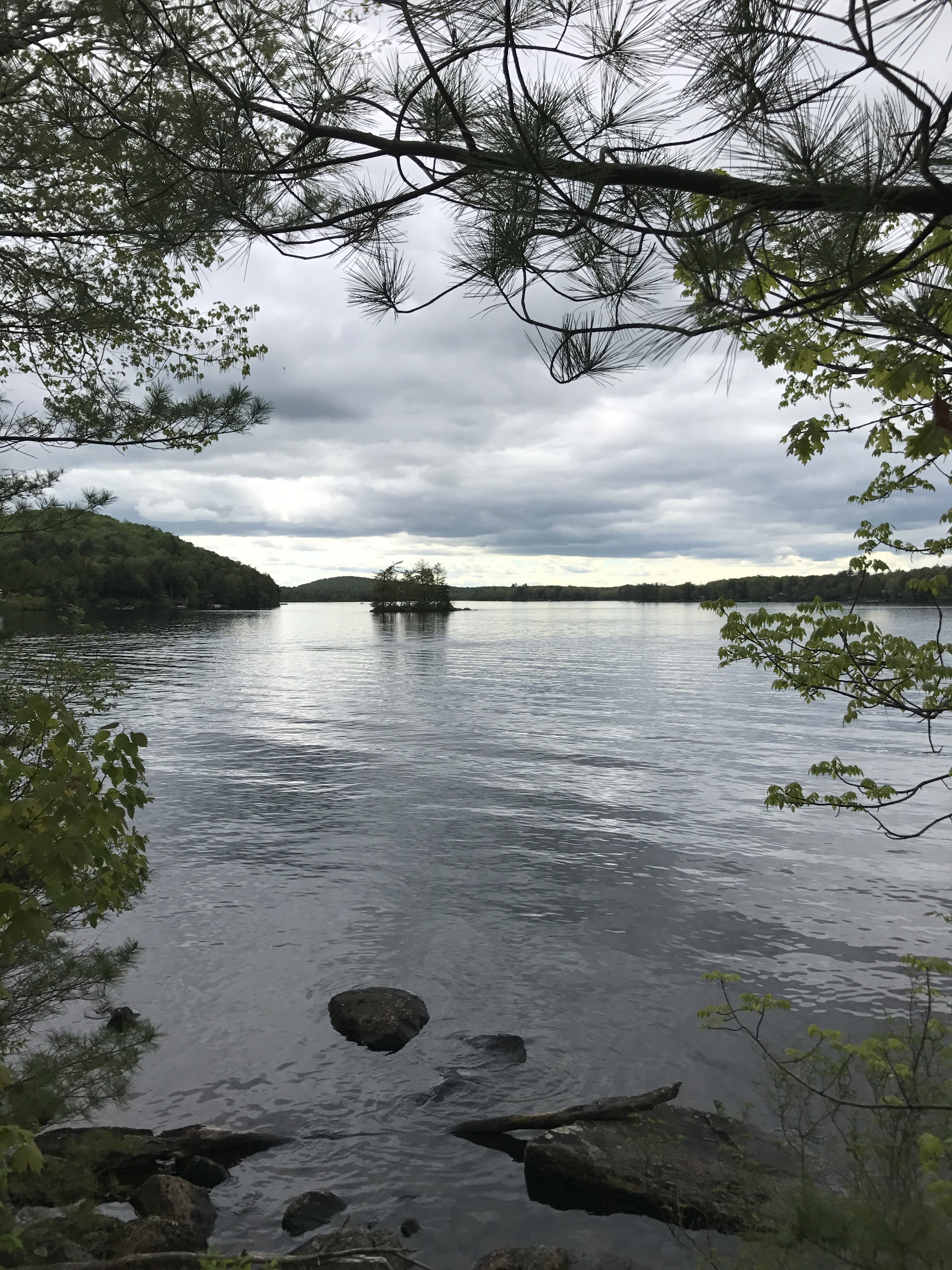
- View of Stoner Island

- Location within New York Canada Lake (the United States)
- Location: NW of Caroga Lake, Fulton County, New York, U.S.
- Coordinates: 43°09′54″N 74°31′52″W, 43°09′46″N 74°29′55″W
- Type: Lake
- Primary inflows: West Lake, Green Lake
- Primary outflows: Sprite Creek
- Basin countries: United States
- Surface area: 892 acres (3.61 km^{2})
- Average depth: 70 ft (21 m)
- Max. depth: 143 ft (44 m)
- Surface elevation: 1,549 ft (472 m)
- Islands: 1 Stoner Island
- Settlements: Caroga Lake (hamlet)

Canada Lake is located in the Town of Caroga in Fulton County in the U.S. state of New York. Unlike the nearby Caroga lakes, Canada Lake is very deep which provides colder water for species such as trout to survive. There is an annual draw down on the lake by way of a control structure on the outlet of Stewart Landing. The impoundment of this water has created a lake complex of Lily Lake, Canada Lake, West Lake and Green Lake.

== Fishing ==
Fish found within this lake include brown trout, brown bullhead, lake trout, chain pickerel, smallmouth bass, lake whitefish, yellow perch, largemouth bass, and pumpkinseed. Canada Lake has excellent fishing for both brown trout and lake trout in the deeper parts of the lake. Smallmouth bass can be found along the rocky shores of Canada Lake.

== History ==
The lake's north shore road was built in the 1840s providing easier access to the lake itself. Homes and hotels were built, wood burning steamers carried tourists on the lake, and Canada Lake became a popular resort destination. Most of the cottages that now dot the shores of Canada, and connecting Green, and West Lakes were built in the late 1800s and early 1900s.
