= Stewart Lake (New York) =

- Location within New York Stewart Lake (the United States)
- Location: Fulton County, New York, United States
- Coordinates: 43°11′11″N 74°28′50″W
- Type: Lake
- Basin countries: United States
- Surface area: 31 acres (0.13 km^{2})
- Average depth: 10 feet (3.0 m)
- Max. depth: 27 feet (8.2 m)
- Shore length^{1}: 1.4 miles (2.3 km)
- Surface elevation: 1,972 feet (601 m)
- Settlements: Wheelerville, New York
- ^{1} Shore length is not a well-defined measure.

Stewart Lake is located north of Wheelerville, New York. Fish species present in the lake are brook trout, and sunfish. There is carry down access via trail off Green Lake Road on the southeast shore.
