= Canada Lake, New York =

- Hamlet
- Location within New York Location within the United States
- Coordinates: 43°10′27″N 74°30′42″W
- Country: United States
- State: New York
- Region: Adirondack Mountains
- County: Fulton
- Town: Caroga
- Elevation: 1,552 ft (473 m)
- Time zone: UTC-5 (Eastern (EST))
  - Summer (DST): UTC-4 (EDT)

Canada Lake is a hamlet in the Town of Caroga in Fulton County, New York.
