= Caroga Lake, New York =

- Census-designated place
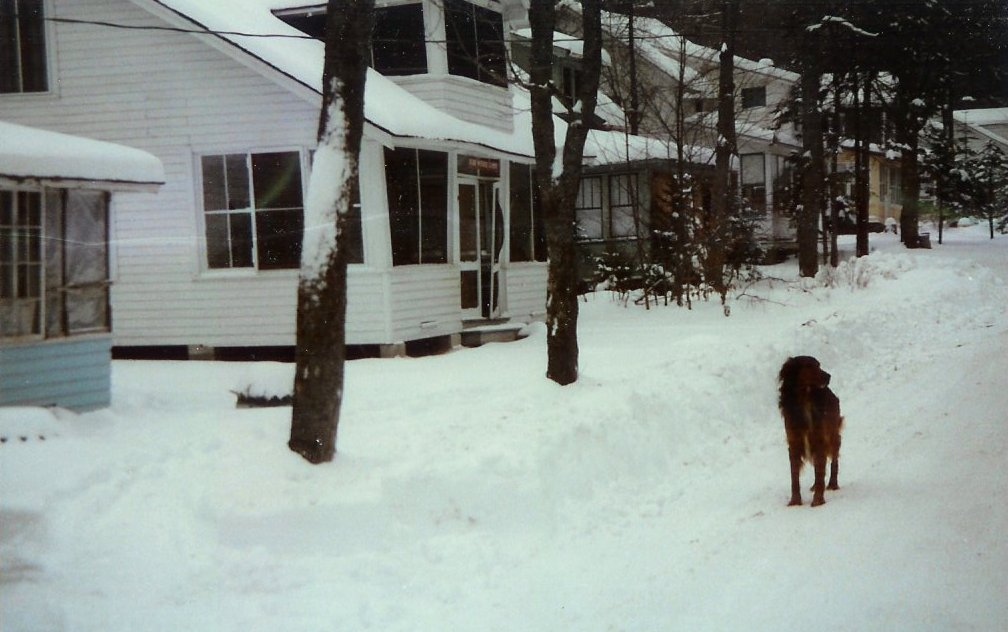

- Location within New York Location within the United States
- Coordinates: 43°8′15″N 74°28′51″W
- Country: United States
- State: New York
- County: Fulton
- Town: Caroga

Area
  - Total: 3.37 sq mi (8.74 km^{2})
  - Land: 2.50 sq mi (6.48 km^{2})
  - Water: 0.87 sq mi (2.26 km^{2})
- Elevation: 1,480 ft (450 m)

Population (2020)
  - Total: 548
  - Density: 219.2/sq mi (84.62/km^{2})
- Time zone: UTC-5 (Eastern (EST))
  - Summer (DST): UTC-4 (EDT)
- ZIP Codes: 12032 (Caroga Lake); 12078 (Gloversville)
- Area code: 518
- FIPS code: 36-12584
- GNIS feature ID: 0945874

Caroga Lake is an unincorporated community and census-designated place (CDP) in the town of Caroga, Fulton County, New York, United States. As of the 2020 census, Caroga Lake had a population of 548. The hamlet is in the southern part of the town of Caroga and is northwest of Gloversville. Two lakes, West Caroga Lake and East Caroga Lake are located next to the hamlet.

== Geography ==
The community of Caroga Lake is situated in northern Fulton County in the southern Adirondack Mountains, centered on a peninsula between West Caroga Lake to the west and East Caroga Lake to the south. The CDP area includes both of the lakes and the developed land surrounding the lakes. According to the United States Census Bureau, the CDP has a total area of 3.4 square miles (8.7 km^{2}), of which 2.5 square miles (6.5 km^{2}) is land and 0.89 square miles (2.3 km^{2}), or 25.89%, is water.

New York State Routes 10 and 29A intersect at the center of the community. NY 10 leads north 24 miles (39 km) to Piseco Lake and south 19 miles (31 km) to Canajoharie on the Mohawk River, while NY 29A leads southeast 10 miles (16 km) to Gloversville. NY 29A follows NY 10 to the northwest out of town, then turns west towards Stratford, 14 miles (23 km) from Caroga Lake.

== Demographics ==
Historical population
Census	Pop.	Note	%±
2020	548		—
U.S. Decennial Census

== Recreational Opportunities ==
Caroga Lake CDP area was home to Sherman's Restaurant and Amusement Park from 1921 until the early 1970s. Sherman's is now owned by Caroga Arts Collective.

Caroga Arts Collective presents over fifty performances and community events featuring world-class artists from various styles of arts and entertainment in the Southern Adirondacks throughout the year. A 501(c)(3) not-for-profit, Caroga Arts presents the Caroga Lake Music Festival, the String Project & Arts Collaborative Education (SPACE) Program, Artist Residencies, and other projects.

The Caroga Historical Museum, operated by the Caroga Historical Association, preserves and showcases the history of the Caroga Lake region. Located at 145 London Bridge Road, the museum features multiple historic buildings. Exhibits focus on the area's early leather tanning and lumber industries, as well as a large collection of Sherman's Amusement Park memorabilia. The museum is open seasonally (June through August, Thursday-Sunday, 1-4 PM) and offers educational programs and events. Admission is free with donations gratefully accepted.

There is a New York State Campground located on the shore of East Caroga Lake that features 105 campsites, a picnic area, sandy beach, trailer dump station, bathhouse, hot showers and toilets.
