= List of county routes in Fulton County, New York =

County routes in Fulton County, New York, are signed with the Manual on Uniform Traffic Control Devices-standard yellow-on-blue pentagon route marker. Road names are given where available; however, some routes are known only by their county route designation, especially those located in the rural northern portion of the county that lies within Adirondack Park.

== Routes 101–130 ==
Route	Length (mi)	Length (km)	From	Via	To	Notes
CR 101	1.81	2.91	CR 131 at West Fulton Street Extension	Meco–Cork Road in Johnstown	NY 29A	Formerly part of NY 399
CR 102	3.40	5.47	Gloversville city line in Johnstown	Easterly and Phelps streets	Riceville Road in Mayfield	
CR 103	0.52	0.84	Montgomery County line (becomes CR 28)	Stoners Trail in Johnstown	NY 67	
CR 104	2.37	3.81	Herkimer County line (becomes CR 130)	Unnamed road in Stratford	NY 29A	Includes both legs of wye intersection with NY 29A
CR 105	0.27	0.43	Gloversville city line	Steele Avenue Extension in Johnstown	NY 920J at Saratoga Boulevard	
CR 106	4.27	6.87	NY 29 in Mayfield	Black Street	NY 30 in Mayfield	
CR 107	14.56	23.43	Johnstown city line	Perth–Johnstown and Perth–West Galway roads	CR 132 at West Galway Road in Perth	
CR 108	4.03	6.49	Herkimer County line (becomes CR 127)	Schell and Twin Church roads in Oppenheim	NY 331	Includes both connecting roads at junction of Schell and Twin Church roads
CR 109	1.67	2.69	Saratoga County line in Broadalbin (becomes CR 14)	Fish House Road	CR 110 in Northampton	Includes both legs of wye intersection with CR 110
CR 110	7.57	12.18	Broadalbin village line in Broadalbin	South Shore Road	Saratoga County line in Northampton (becomes CR 7)	
CR 111	1.36	2.19	CR 112	London Bridge Road in Caroga	Kasson Drive	
CR 112	8.84	14.23	NY 309 at Lily Lake Road in Bleecker	Unnamed road	NY 10 in Caroga	
CR 113	1.48	2.38	CR 149 at Tennantville Road	Northville–Edinburg Road in Northampton	Saratoga County line (becomes CR 4)	
CR 114	2.84	4.57	Montgomery County line (becomes CR 56)	Lassellsville Road in Oppenheim	NY 29	
CR 115	0.06	0.10	NY 29	Johnson Avenue in Johnstown	Johnstown city line	Ownership transferred to town
CR 116	4.40	7.08	NY 334	Unnamed road in Johnstown	NY 29	Discontinuous at NY 67; includes connector at north junction with NY 67
CR 116A	0.57	0.92	Montgomery County line (becomes CR 36)	Unnamed road in Johnstown	CR 116	
CR 117	1.1	1.77	CR 107	Tryon Technology Park in Perth	CR 117 (0.18 mi N of CR 107)	
CR 117	0.3	0.48	Broadalbin village line in Broadalbin	CR 117	Lakeview Road in Broadalbin	Route renumbered to CR 110
CR 118	0.3	0.48	NY 29	CR 118	NY 10	Ownership transferred to Town of Ephratah as Valley Road
CR 119	11.59	18.65	NY 29 in Ephratah	North Road	CR 104 in Stratford	Includes both legs of wye intersection with CR 104
CR 120	2.58	4.15	CR 108	Schuyler Road in Oppenheim	Dolgeville village line	
CR 121	0.53	0.85	Gloversville city line	North Main Street in Johnstown	CR 122	Includes both legs of wye intersection with CR 122
CR 122	5.42	8.72	Johnstown city line	Maple Avenue and West Bush Road in Johnstown	CR 102	
CR 123	6.16	9.91	NY 30 in Mayfield	Mountain Road	CR 152 in Northampton	
CR 125	7.42	11.94	CR 112	Unnamed road in Bleecker	Hamilton County line (becomes CR 6)	
CR 126	5.60	9.01	Montgomery County line in Perth	Hagaman Road	Broadalbin village line in Broadalbin	
CR 127	4.62	7.44	Gloversville city line	East Fulton Street Extension and Turkey Farm Road	NY 29 in Broadalbin	Ownership transferred to NYSDOT as an extension of NY 29A
CR 128	0.85	1.37	Harrison Street	South Kingsboro Avenue Extension in Johnstown	Gloversville city line	Ownership transferred to City of Gloversville
CR 130	0.51	0.82	Gifford Valley Road	Unnamed road in Northampton	NY 30	

== Routes 131 and up ==
Route	Length (mi)	Length (km)	From	Via	To	Notes
CR 131	2.09	3.36	NY 29	Meco Road in Johnstown	CR 101 at West Fulton Street Extension	
CR 131A	1.59	2.56	CR 131	O'Neil Avenue in Johnstown	Johnstown city line	
CR 132	3.03	4.88	Montgomery County line	Hagaman–West Galway Road in Perth	CR 107 at West Galway Road	
CR 137	3.79	6.10	Cape Horn Road	Beech Ridge Road in Caroga	NY 29A	Includes both legs of wye intersection with NY 29A
CR 138	4.65	7.48	NY 29	Union Mills Road in Broadalbin	CR 110	
CR 140	2.40	3.86	Montgomery County line (becomes CR 53)	Unnamed road in Ephratah	NY 10/NY 67	Includes former routing of NY 920B
CR 142	2.62	4.22	Montgomery County line (becomes CR 24)	Millers Corners Road in Johnstown	CR 107	
CR 142A	0.95	1.53	NY 67	Albany Bush Road in Johnstown	CR 142	Includes both legs of wye intersection with CR 142
CR 143	1.59	2.56	Northville village line	Maple Grove Road in Northampton	Hamilton County line (becomes CR 21)	
CR 145	1.35	2.17	CR 112	Bowler Road in Bleecker	Barlow Road	
CR 146	3.47	5.58	CR 102 in Johnstown	West Main Street	NY 30 in Mayfield	
CR 148	0.65	1.05	Montgomery County line (becomes CR 31)	Glebe Street in Johnstown	Johnstown city line	
CR 149	1.19	1.92	CR 113	Ridge Road in Northampton	Northville village line	
CR 150	1.17	1.88	CR 108	Unnamed road in Oppenheim	NY 331	
CR 151	2.20	3.54	CR 108	Johnson Lane in Oppenheim	NY 29	
CR 152	3.04	4.89	NY 30	Old Route 30 in Northampton	Bridge Street (NY 920H)	Former routing of NY 30
CR 153	0.36	0.58	NY 67	Airport Road in Johnstown	Fulton County Airport	
CR 154	1.46	2.35	Gloversville city line in Johnstown	East State Street	NY 30A in Mayfield	Former routing of NY 148
CR 155	1.31	2.11	NY 29 in Mayfield	West Main Street and Saratoga Avenue	NY 29 in Broadalbin	Former routing of NY 29
CR 156	1.28	2.06	NY 67	Fire Road in Johnstown	NY 29	
CR 157	0.83	1.34	NY 349	Patch Road in Mayfield	CR 154	
CR 158	1.70	2.74	CR 107 in Perth	Boonwell Farm Road	NY 29 in Mayfield	Former routing of NY 29A

== See also ==
- County routes in New York
