= New York State Route 399 =

Former state highway in New York State

New York State Route 399
- Former NY 399 highlighted in red

Route information
- Maintained by NYSDH
- Existed: April 1935–early 1960s

Major junctions
- South end: NY 29 in Johnstown
- North end: NY 29A in Johnstown

Location
- Country: United States
- State: New York
- Counties: Fulton

Highway system
- New York Highways; Interstate; US; State; Reference; Parkways
← NY 398	→ NY 400

New York State Route 399 (NY 399) was a state highway located within the town of Johnstown in Fulton County, New York, in the United States. It served as a connector between NY 29 in the hamlet of Cork and NY 29A in the hamlet of Meco. After being proposed in 1931, the route was assigned in April 1935. The designation was removed by the early 1960s, but a section remained a state highway until April 1, 1980, when it transferred between the state of New York and Fulton County.

== Route description ==
NY 399 began at a junction with NY 29 northwest of the Cork Center Reservoir in the town of Johnstown. The route ran northeast through the dense woods along Sweet Road, climbing up the hills of Fulton County south of the Adirondack Park to a junction with North Bush Road, where it turned eastward along North Bush. Along North Bush, NY 399 passed a cemetery and local radio tower. Bending along a curve around the hill, the route reached a junction with McGregor Road, reaching the junction with Fulton Street Extension, where it turned northeast around another hill. After turning eastward, the route reached the hamlet of Meco, where it met a junction with NY 29A, which marked the eastern terminus of NY 399.

== History ==
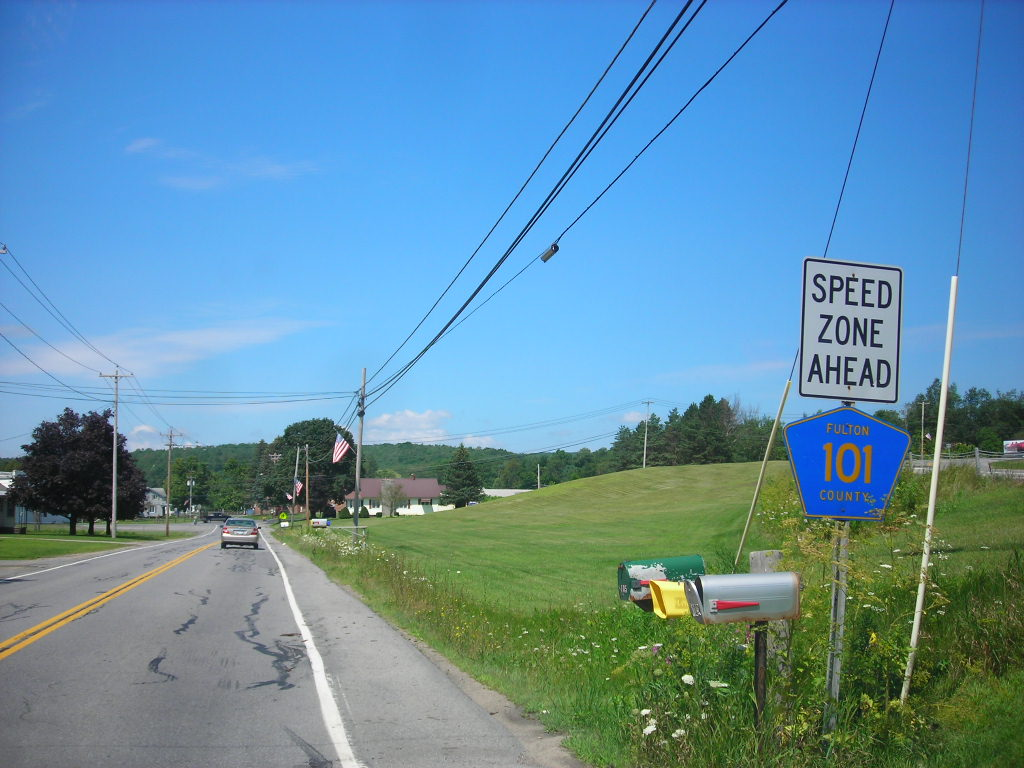
CR 101 in Meco. CR 101 replaced the alignment through Meco in 1980

In January 1931, New York State Senator Henry Patrie and Assemblyman Eberly Hutchinson proposed to construct a new state highway between the hamlets of Meco and Cork Center. The new state highway would be an improvement over a sand-ridden 4.5-mile (7.2 km) road between the two communities. This new state highway would also allow Gloversville easier access to the western end of Fulton County. In February 1931, the city of Gloversville Chamber of Commerce and Better Business approved a resolution stating support for the new state highway. Governor Franklin Delano Roosevelt signed the bill on April 6.

NY 399 was assigned in April 1935 and initially extended from NY 29 in Cork to NY 29A (modern Peck Road) west of Meco despite being a dirt road for some of its length. It was extended slightly c. 1940 after NY 29A was realigned to bypass Meco to the north. The NY 399 designation remained unchanged up through the late 1950s to the early 1960s, when it was removed. Part of NY 399's former routing on Sweet Road was physically removed by 1970, severing the Cork–Meco through route.

On two occasions, the former alignment of NY 399 still maintained by the state was proposed as part of a highway maintenance swap. The first time, in August 1964, with the proposed construction of County Route 156 (CR 156) between NY 29 and NY 67. At that time, the state proposed the transfer of the former NY 399 alignment, along with NY 309, NY 331, NY 334 and NY 10A to Fulton County in return for CR 103, CR 127, and a town road. The proposal was tabled by the county. In January 1978, the state and the county agreed to a scaled-down swap that would allow the state to acquire CR 127 in return for former NY 399, East Fulton Street Extension in Gloversville and West Perth Road.

On April 1, 1980, ownership and maintenance of old NY 399 between North Bush Road (County Route 131 or CR 131) and Peck Road was transferred from the state to Fulton County. Following the swap, the highway became part of CR 101, which had already been designated along NY 399's former alignment between Peck Road and NY 29A. The remainder of NY 399's intact routing is now maintained by the town of Johnstown.

== Major intersections ==
The entire route was in Johnstown, Fulton County.

mi	km	Destinations	Notes
0.0	0.0	NY 29	Hamlet of Cork
		NY 29A	Hamlet of Meco
1.000 mi = 1.609 km; 1.000 km = 0.621 mi

== See also ==
- List of county routes in Fulton County, New York
