= New York State Route 349 =

State highway in Fulton County, New York, US

New York State Route 349
- NY 349 highlighted in red

Route information
- Maintained by NYSDOT
- Length: 3.58 mi (5.76 km)
- Existed: c. 1931–present

Major junctions
- West end: NY 30A in Johnstown
- East end: NY 30 in Mayfield

Location
- Country: United States
- State: New York
- Counties: Fulton

Highway system
- New York Highways; Interstate; US; State; Reference; Parkways
← NY 348	→ NY 350

New York State Route 349 (NY 349) is an east–west state highway in Fulton County, New York, in the United States. The highway extends for 3.58 miles (5.76 km) across largely rural terrain from an intersection with NY 30A in the town of Johnstown to a junction with NY 30 in the town of Mayfield. The westernmost section of the route is known as East State Street Extension. NY 349 was assigned c. 1931 to the portion of its alignment between County Route 154 (CR 154; then NY 148) and NY 30. It was extended west to its present terminus in the mid-1950s after NY 148 was rerouted onto an arterial highway between Gloversville and Mayfield.

== Route description ==
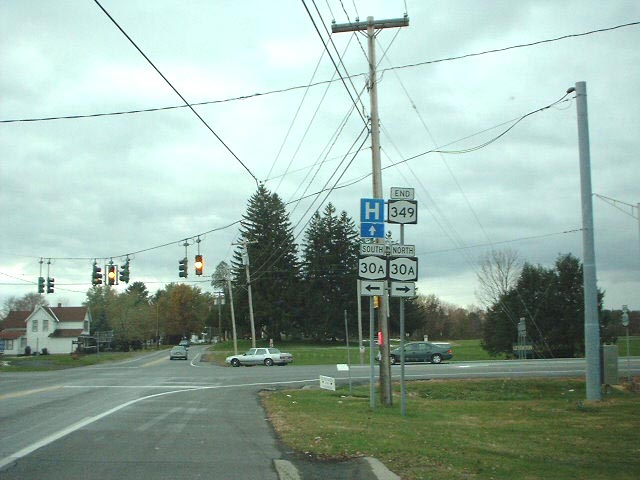
Western terminus of NY 349

NY 349 begins just east of the Gloversville city limits at an intersection with NY 30A (Adirondack Trail) in the town of Johnstown. It heads northeast as the two-lane East State Street Extension, passing by a line of homes as it leaves the Gloversville area. After one-half mile (0.8 km), the number of residences surrounding the route begins to dwindle as the highway enters more rural areas. It continues to the hamlet of Dennies Crossing, where it meets CR 154, a connector leading north to NY 30A, which parallels NY 349 through this portion of Johnstown. Just east of the junction, NY 349 crosses a rail trail that was once the right-of-way of the Fonda, Johnstown and Gloversville Railroad.

Past Dennies Crossing, the highway takes on a slightly southeastern alignment into the town of Mayfield, where it traverses progressively less developed and more forested areas. About one mile (1.6 km) into the town, the route makes a northeastward turn, crossing the FJ&G Rail Trail once again and serving a handful of homes before ending at an intersection with NY 30 in Red Bunch Corners, a small community two miles (3.2 km) south of the village of Mayfield and three miles (5 km) north of the larger hamlet of Vail Mills. The route serves mostly as a local connector highway, handling just over 3,000 vehicles per day on average.

== History ==
On June 5, 1901, the state of New York let a contract to improve 4.03 miles (6.49 km) of highway in the towns of Johnstown and Mayfield—including the portion of modern NY 349 west of what is now CR 154—to state highway standards. The project cost $30,952 (equivalent to $1,083,205 in 2024) and was completed by mid-1903. The highways improved by the project were added to the state highway system on July 24, 1903, as State Highway 33 (SH 33). A contract to improve the 2.01 miles (3.23 km) of modern NY 349 between CR 154 and the former Fonda, Johnstown and Gloversville Railroad was awarded on September 1, 1906. In all, the project cost $17,980 (equivalent to $629,233 in 2024) and took approximately two years to complete. The improved roadway was accepted into the state highway system on October 8, 1908, as SH 248. The section of what is now NY 349 between the old railroad line and current NY 30 was improved and designated as SH 1935 by the state sometime after 1926.

In 1908, the New York State Legislature created Route 24, an unsigned legislative route that initially extended from Fonda to Speculator via Gloversville and Mayfield. From Gloversville to Mayfield, Route 24 was routed on SH 33, which broke from East State Street at modern CR 154 and followed CR 154 toward Mayfield. In the mid-1920s, all of legislative Route 24's original routing was designated as part of NY 54, a U-shaped route that began in Utica and passed through Poland, Wilmurt, Speculator, and Gloversville before ending in Fonda.

NY 54 was broken up into a handful of routes as part of the 1930 renumbering of state highways in New York. The portion of the route south of Mayfield became the northern half of NY 148, a new north–south highway that continued past Fonda to Central Bridge. Meanwhile, SH 248 and SH 1935 were designated as NY 349 by the following year. In the mid-1950s, NY 148 was realigned between Gloversville and Mayfield to follow a new arterial highway located just north of its original alignment. The former routing of NY 148 along East State Street became part of an extended NY 349.

== Major intersections ==
The entire route is in Fulton County.

Location	mi	km	Destinations	Notes
Town of Johnstown	0.00	0.00	East State Street –	Continuation past NY 30A
Town of Johnstown	0.00	0.00	NY 30A (Adirondack Trail)	Western terminus
Town of Johnstown	0.96	1.54	CR 154	Former routing of NY 148
Town of Mayfield	3.58	5.76	NY 30 – Mayfield, Vail Mills	Eastern terminus
1.000 mi = 1.609 km; 1.000 km = 0.621 mi
