= New York State Route 435 =

New York State Route 435 may refer to:

- New York State Route 435 (1940s) in Herkimer County.
- New York State Route 435 (reserved) a reserved designation in Fulton County along current NY 29A from NY 10 to NY 30A.
