= David H. Burr =

American cartographer, surveyor and topographer (1803-1875)

- Born: August 1803; Bridgeport, Connecticut, United States
- Died: 1875 (aged 71–72)
- Occupations: Cartography, surveyor, topographer
- Spouses: Susan Cottle Bush (m. 1828) Sophia Augustine Howell (m. 1835)
- Children: 9

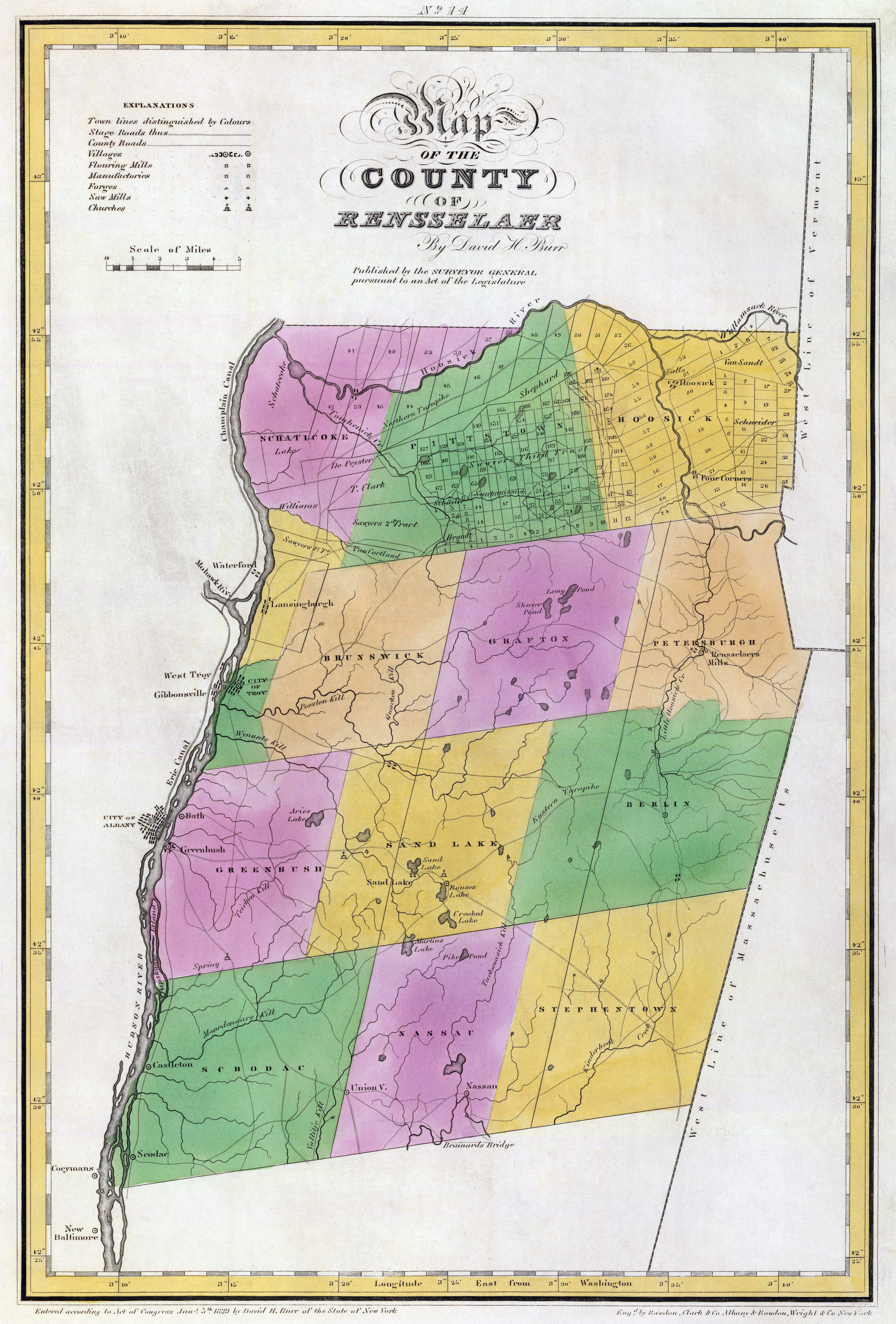
Map of Rensselaer County, New York, United States in 1829, by David H. Burr

David Burr (1803–1875) was an American cartographer, surveyor and topographer. He served in several positions for the United States government, as the official topographer for the United States Post Office Department from 1832 until 1838, and as a draftsman for the United States House of Representatives from 1838 until 1840 and for the United States Senate from 1853 until 1855. He was also Surveyor General of Utah from 1855 to 1857.

== Early life ==
David Burr was born in August 1803 in Bridgeport, Connecticut. He moved to Kingsboro, New York in 1822 and attended law school. He passed the New York bar to become a lawyer. After becoming a member of the New York State Bar Association, he joined the New York State Militia.

== Marriage and family ==
Married Susan Cottle Bush on September 29, 1828. They had three children.

Married Sophia Augustine Howell on August 4, 1835. They had six children.

== Professional work ==
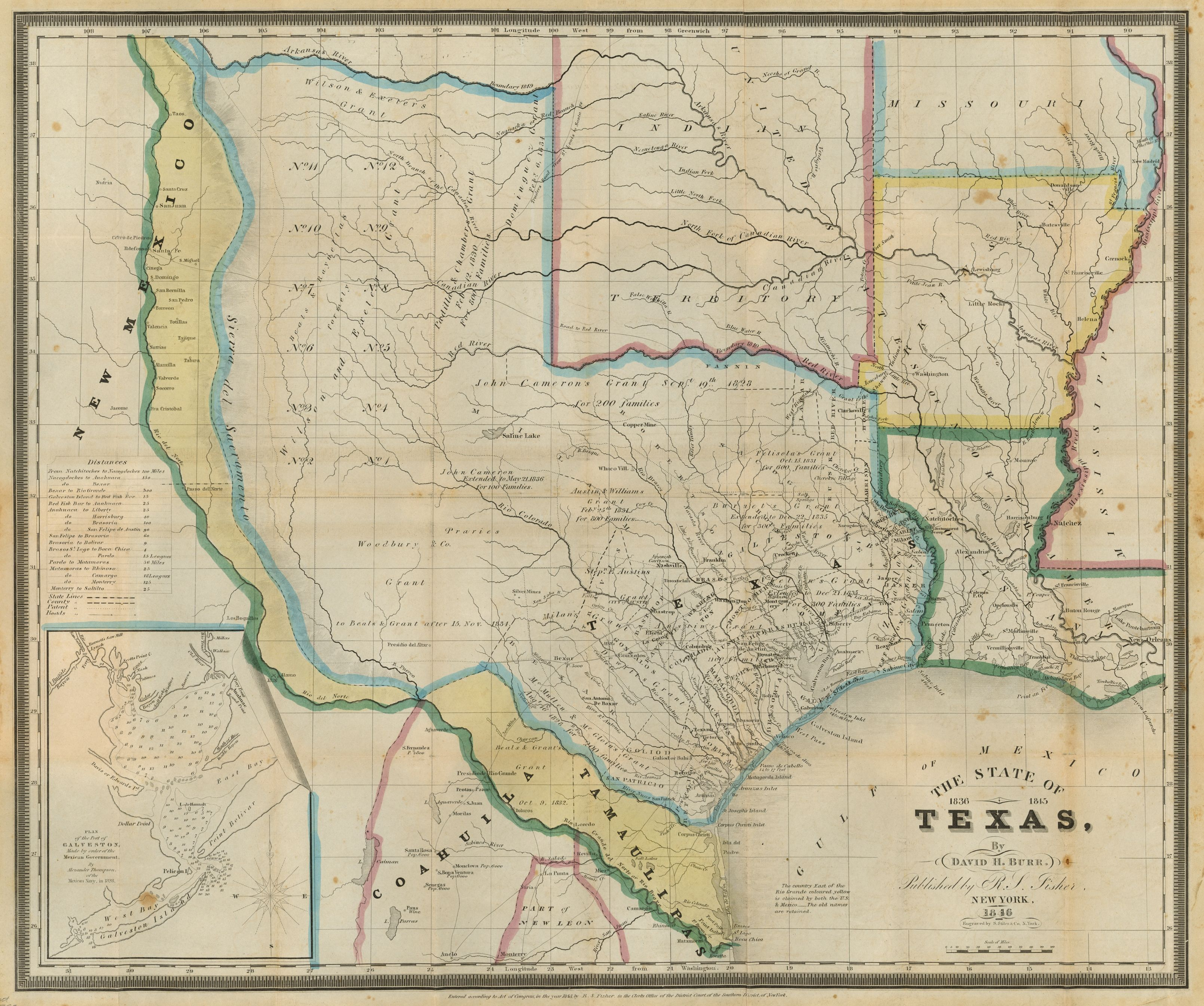
Burr's The State of Texas, 1835-1845 (1846)

He started working as a surveyor for Simeon De Witt, surveying roads in New York. Areas of the state were being rapidly developed in relation to industrialization and increased trade from the Erie Canal. He published his first atlas in 1829, the Atlas of the State of New York, which was sponsored by the state government. This was the second atlas ever created for a state.

In 1832 Burr became the official topographer of the United States Post Office Department. In 1835 he published the New Universal Atlas. He also maintained the routes of the United States Postmasters General. He created a map of their routes, which feature details about the roads, canals and railroads.

Around 1838, Burr traveled to London to collaborate with John Arrowsmith. (Note: This reference states that Burr traveled to London in 1846 to create the atlas. Since it was published in 1839, the source's date is either off by at least eight years, or Burr traveled to London at a later date for another reason.) to create the American Atlas, which was published in 1839.

After he returned, Burr was appointed as a draftsman for the House of Representatives of the United States. During this tenure he published: North-west-Coast of North America and adjacent Territories Compiled from the best authorities under the direction of Robert Greenhow to accompany his Memoir on the North-west Coast Published by order of the Senate of the United States drawn by David H. Burr (1840). Although some sources state that he continued in this position until 1847, he is not listed in any of the Registers of Officers and Agents, Civil, Military, and Naval in the Service of the United States from 1841 until 1847, when he turns up as a draftsman for the Louisiana Survey. In 1848, he was appointed the Deputy U.S. Surveyor for the Florida Survey and was back in Washington D.C. for the 1850 census.

On January 9, 1852, the U.S. Senate resolved to employ a draughtsman to compile maps of the Federal Surveys that had been conducted. Burr was appointed this position. It was during this tenure that he put forth his last known published map: Map of the United States, 1854.

== Travels west ==
In 1853, Burr traveled to San Francisco. How or when he arrived there, or whether he did do as part of his official duties is unclear, but his son Shields was born late in August 1853, indicating that he was in Washington D.C. until late in November 1852. He may have traveled to the Pacific Coast to prepare maps of the surveys that had been completed so far in California and the Washington and Oregon Territories. He left to return east in July 1853, possibly to be with his wife for the birth of their son. It appears that he tried to leave a few weeks earlier and got as far as Panama where he was turned back for some reason, caught the SS Pacific at port and returned to San Francisco on June 13 leaving 17 days later on July 1, 1853, crossing Central America at Nicaragua.

He was appointed the Surveyor General of Utah in 1855 (Note: At that time, much of the current State of Nevada was incorporated into the Utah Territory. The "Dr. Hurt" referenced in the letter in the source is Indian Agent Garland Hurt and the "diggers" referred to are Native Americans. "Digger Indian" was a somewhat disparaging term for Native Americans living a hardscrabble existence in Great Basin Desert who would "dig" for much of their food source.) and he and his sons, David Augustus (David A.-age 16) and Eugene (age 17) traveled overland from St. Louis, (Note: The story in this blog has some inaccuracies. Eugene Burr died in a hunting accident at the age of 19 that occurred not in Utah, but in Maryland. David A.'s younger brother was Shields, who died off the coast of Mexico in 1883, possibly working with Albert Kimsey Owen.) arriving in Salt Lake City (SLC) in late June or early July. At some point, Burr's oldest son Frederick H. Burr joined them from Montana and was hired as Deputy Surveyor General, and Eugene was the Chief Clerk. Burr's last known map: Map of a survey of the Indian Reservation of Spanish Fork Cr., Utah Territory : showing its connection with the U.S. Survey of the Territory / by David A. [i.e. H.] Burr, Surveyor was drawn during this time. On August 30, 1856, Burr wrote to Thomas A. Hendricks, the Commissioner of the General Land Office, that one of his Deputy Surveyors had been badly beaten by a "Danite mob". The Burrs' work there was reportedly continually sabotaged by Mormons hostile to the Federal Government, and the house some of his men were staying within Fillmore was stoned by a mob. In April 1857, Burr and his son(s) (Frederick was apparently back in Montana by March 1857, and Eugene may have already returned east, if not he continued east from Leavenworth, to be killed shortly afterwards on September 27, 1857). fled Utah to Fort Leavenworth due to the threatening atmosphere. He was accused of nepotism (not unwarranted), improficiency in his duties and abandoning his post and either resigned or was relieved of the position, but when the Federal Government sent the army to Utah in 1858, David A. returned to SLC in 1858 to turn over his father's surveying records to the territorial governor, trying to vindicate Burr's name. David A. stayed in SLC another year or so, becoming a professional photographer. After partnering with John M. Hockaday in a freight operation sending wagons of goods and mail over South Pass to SLC, (one of the wagon masters was Jack Slade), Burr also returned to Utah, but stayed near Camp Floyd. Due to an exceptionally hard winter at South Pass in 1858–59, the freight business failed, and around 1859, Hockaday and Burr opened up a dry goods store on the corner of 1st south and East Temple Street in SLC. A large purchase from the store by the Superintendent of Indian Affairs for Utah, Jacob Forney, in 1859 led to accusations of embezzlement and removal from his post. Burr was also appointed to undertake the 1860 Utah census, but his unpopularity led to a clerk in his store given that duty. Sometime before 1870, Burr retired and returned to Washington D.C.
