= Log Cabin Church =

Historic church in New York, United States

- U.S. National Register of Historic Places
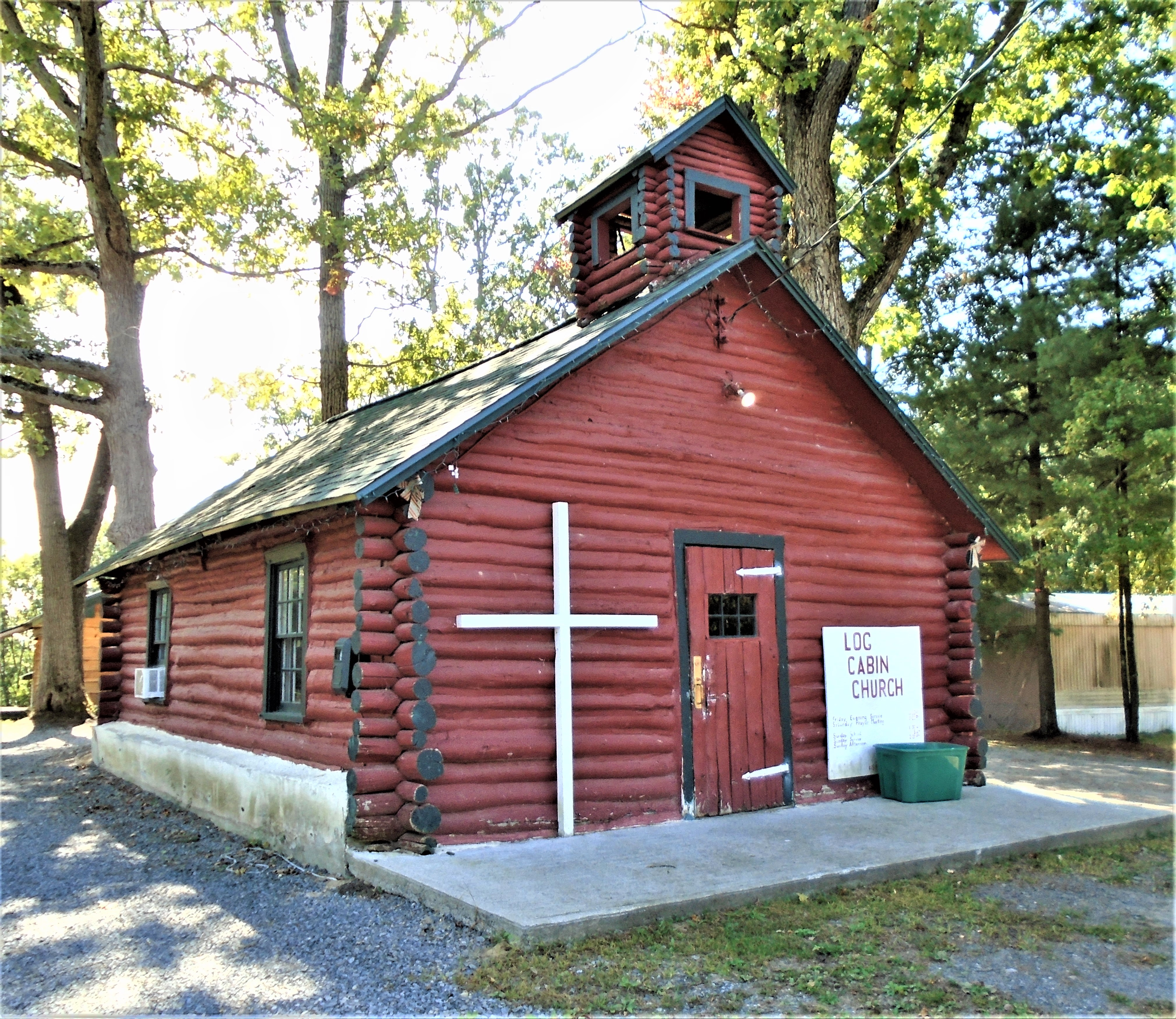
- (2020)

- Location within New York Location within the United States
- Location: 413 Progress Rd., Mayfield, New York
- Coordinates: 43°02′34″N 74°17′39″W
- Built: 1937
- NRHP reference No.: 99000350
- Added to NRHP: March 18, 1999

Log Cabin Church is a historic non-denominational church at 413 Progress Road in the hamlet of Progress in the town of Mayfield, Fulton County, New York. It was built in 1937 and is a 26 feet deep by 18 feet wide log structure constructed of white poplar logs laid horizontally. Also on the property is a privy and a parish activities hall.

The Log Cabin Church was listed on the National Register of Historic Places in 1999.
