= Oliver Rice House =

Historic house in New York, United States

- Oliver Rice House; Rice Homestead
- U.S. National Register of Historic Places
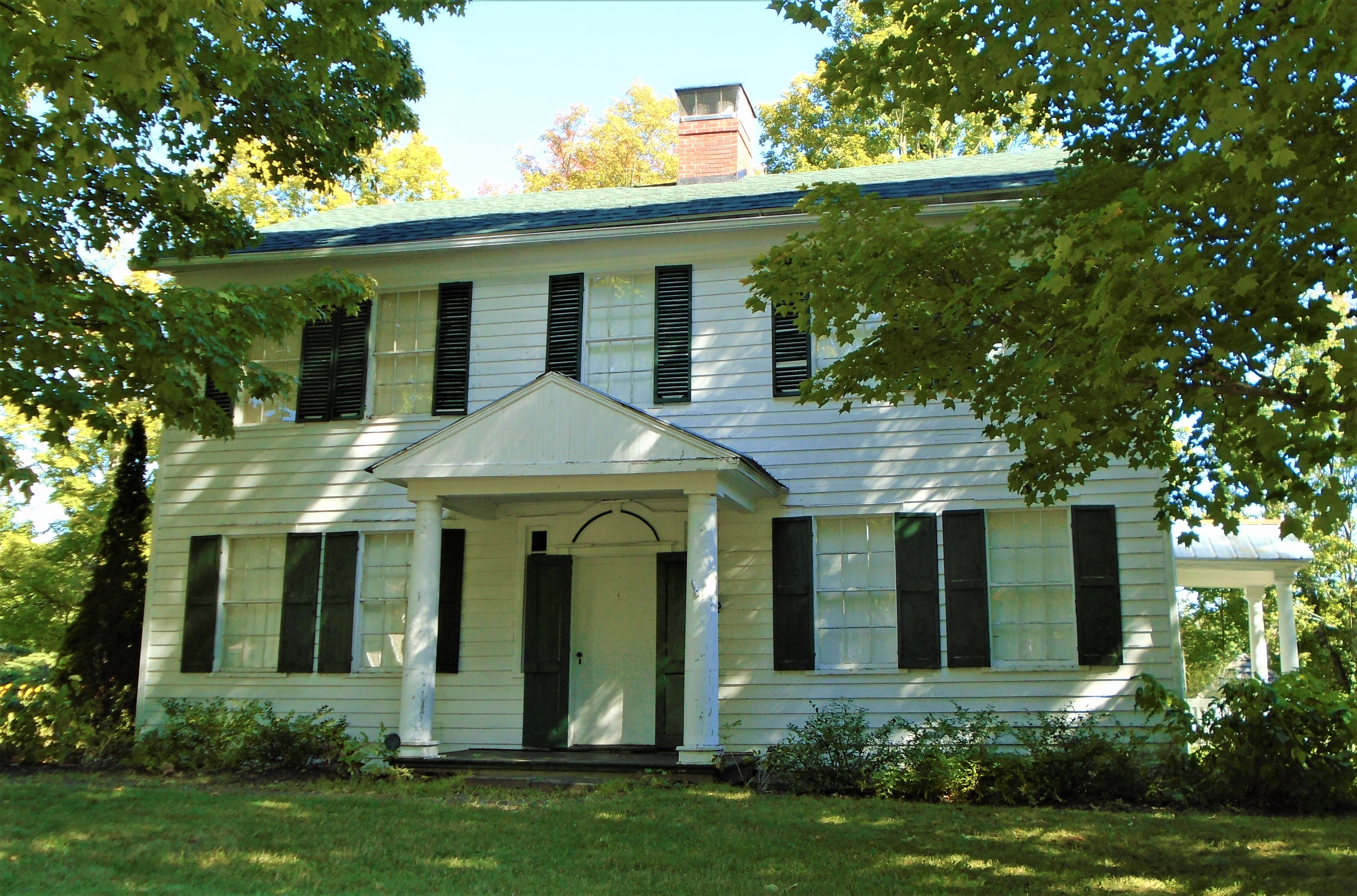
- (2020)

- Location within New York Location within the United States
- Location: 328 Riceville Road (Old NY 30); Mayfield, New York
- Coordinates: 43°6′0″N 74°16′40″W
- Area: 4.3 acres (1.7 ha)
- Built: 1810
- Architectural style: Early Republic
- NRHP reference No.: 95000046
- Added to NRHP: February 10, 1995

The Oliver Rice House, also called the Rice Homestead, is a historic home located at Mayfield in Fulton County, New York. Rice served in the American Revolutionary War under George Washington.

The main section of the house was built about 1810 and is a large, 2-story, five-bay, center-chimney frame dwelling enlarged and expanded in three phases through 1936. A small 1 1/2-story wing constructed about 1790 was moved and appended to this house sometime between about 1810 and 1847. Also on the property is a 19th-century brick smokehouse and a garage and pumphouse dating to the early 20th century.

It was listed on the National Register of Historic Places in 1995.
