= Oppenheim and St. Johnsville Union Society Church =

Historic church in New York, United States

- U.S. National Register of Historic Places
- Location within New York Location within the United States
- Location: 110 County Highway 108, Crum Creek, New York
- Coordinates: 43°2′27″N 74°43′16″W
- Area: 0.344 acres (0.139 ha)
- Built: 1853
- NRHP reference No.: 10000485
- Added to NRHP: July 19, 2010

Oppenheim and St. Johnsville Union Society Church, also known as Crum Creek Evangelical Lutheran Church, is a historic Lutheran church at 110 County Highway 108 in Crum Creek, Fulton County, New York. It was built in 1853 and is a 2 1/2-story, rectangular frame building, three bays wide and five bays deep. It has a polychrome slate roof, rests on a cut limestone foundation, and is clad in brick added in 1907. It features a square, open belfry with four sawn Gothic spires. The last church service in the building was held in September 2009.

It was listed on the National Register of Historic Places in 2010.
