= Dolgeville Airport =

Airport in New York State

- IATA: none; ICAO: none; FAA LID: 1F6

Summary
- Airport type: Public use
- Owner: Dolgeville Athletic Assn.
- Serves: Dolgeville, New York
- Elevation AMSL: 945 ft (288 m)
- Coordinates: 43°07′00″N 074°44′59″W

Map
- Location of airport in New York

Runways
Direction	Length		Surface
Direction	ft	m	Surface
11/29	1,360	415	Turf

Statistics (2009)
- Aircraft operations: 44
- Sources: FAA and NYSDOT

Dolgeville Airport (FAA LID: 1F6) is a privately owned, public use airport in Fulton County, New York, United States. It is one nautical mile (2 km) northeast of the central business district of Dolgeville, a village located in Fulton County and Herkimer County.

== Facilities and aircraft ==
Dolgeville Airport covers an area of 10 acres (4 ha) at an elevation of 945 feet (288 m) above mean sea level. It has one runway designated 11/29 with a turf surface measuring 1,360 by 100 feet (415 x 30 m).

For the 12-month period ending July 22, 2009, the airport had 44 aircraft operations: 68% general aviation and 32% military.
