= Middle Falls, New York =

- Hamlet
- Location within New York Location within the United States
- Coordinates: 43°06′02″N 73°31′29″W
- Country: United States
- State: New York
- County: Washington
- Elevation: 328 ft (100 m)
- Time zone: UTC-5 (Eastern (EST))
  - Summer (DST): UTC-4 (EDT)
- ZIP code: 12848
- Area codes: 518 & 838
- GNIS feature ID: 957097

Middle Falls is a hamlet within the town of Greenwich in Washington County, New York, United States. The community is located along New York State Route 29 1.5 miles (2.4 km) north-northwest of Greenwich. Middle Falls has a post office with ZIP code 12848, which opened on January 12, 1832.
