= Broadalbin, New York =

- Town
- Location within New York Location within the United States
- Coordinates: 43°03′17″N 74°11′34″W
- Country: United States
- State: New York
- County: Fulton

Government
  - Type: Town Council
  - Town Supervisor: Joseph DiGiacomo (R)
  - Town Council: Members: • Doug Kissinger (R); • Dave Bogardus (R); • Dave Bardascini (R); • Mike Rorick (R)

Area
  - Total: 39.78 sq mi (103.03 km^{2})
  - Land: 31.72 sq mi (82.16 km^{2})
  - Water: 8.06 sq mi (20.87 km^{2})
- Elevation: 840 ft (260 m)

Population (2010)
  - Total: 5,260
  - Estimate (2016): 5,160
  - Density: 162.7/sq mi (62.81/km^{2})
- Time zone: UTC-5 (Eastern (EST))
  - Summer (DST): UTC-4 (EDT)
- ZIP Codes: 12025 (Broadalbin); 12010 (Amsterdam)
- Area codes: 518 and 838
- FIPS code: 36-035-08433
- GNIS feature ID: 978755
- Website: www.townofbroadalbinny.org

Broadalbin is a town in Fulton County, New York, on the eastern border of the county and northwest of Albany. The town was named after the Breadalbane Region in Scotland by an early settler. The town contains a village also called Broadalbin. The population was 5,260 at the 2010 census.

== History ==
The town was part of the Sacandaga Patent of 1741. It was first settled by Europeans c. 1770, near the location of the present Broadalbin village.

Lithograph of Broadalbin from 1880 printed by L.R. Burleigh with list of landmarks

Castle Cumberland was a short-lived fortification in the town during the American Revolutionary War.

Broadalbin was created from the towns of Johnstown and Mayfield in 1793, before Fulton County was formed. In 1799, part of Broadalbin was used to form the town of Northampton. Broadalbin lost the southern part of the town in 1842 to form Perth.

When the Great Sacandaga Lake was created in 1930, some of the town's land was covered with water, including the Sacondaga Vlaie, a broad expanse of marshy land.

== Geography ==
Broadalbin is located along the eastern edge of Fulton County, at the southern end of Great Sacandaga Lake. The eastern town line is the border of Saratoga County. The village of Broadalbin is on the western side of the town and extends west into the town of Mayfield. The town is partially in the Adirondack Park.

According to the United States Census Bureau, the town has a total area of 39.7 square miles (102.9 km^{2}), of which 31.7 square miles (82.2 km^{2}) is land and 8.1 square miles (20.9 km^{2}), or 20.26%, is water.

New York State Route 29 crosses the center of the town, leading east to Saratoga Springs and west to Johnstown, the Fulton County seat.

== Demographics ==
As of the census of 2000, there were 5,066 people, 1,951 households and 1,404 families residing in the town. The population density was 159.7 inhabitants per square mile (61.7/km^{2}). There were 2,625 housing units at an average density of 82.7 per square mile (31.9/km^{2}). The racial makeup of the town was 98.34% White, 0.55% Black or African American, 0.24% Native American, 0.10% Asian, 0.02% Pacific Islander, 0.22% from other races, and 0.53% from two or more races. Hispanic or Latino of any race were 1.11% of the population.

Historical population
Census	Pop.	Note	%±
1820	2,428		—
1830	2,657		9.4%
1840	2,738		3.0%
1850	2,476		−9.6%
1860	2,534		2.3%
1870	2,492		−1.7%
1880	2,175		−12.7%
1890	2,021		−7.1%
1900	1,946		−3.7%
1910	1,845		−5.2%
1920	1,949		5.6%
1930	2,226		14.2%
1940	2,300		3.3%
1950	2,543		10.6%
1960	2,945		15.8%
1970	3,542		20.3%
1980	4,074		15.0%
1990	4,397		7.9%
2000	5,066		15.2%
2010	5,260		3.8%
2016 (est.)	5,160	▼	−1.9%
U.S. Decennial Census

There were 1,951 households, out of which 35.5% had children under the age of 18 living with them, 57.7% were married couples living together, 9.9% had a female householder with no husband present, and 28.0% were non-families. 22.8% of all households were made up of individuals, and 10.2% had someone living alone who was 65 years of age or older. The average household size was 2.59 and the average family size was 3.04.

In the town, the population was spread out, with 27.1% under the age of 18, 6.0% from 18 to 24, 29.7% from 25 to 44, 23.7% from 45 to 64, and 13.5% who were 65 years of age or older. The median age was 38 years. For every 100 females, there were 99.0 males. For every 100 females age 18 and over, there were 96.6 males.

The median income for a household in the town was $40,417, and the median income for a family was $44,957. Males had a median income of $34,263 versus $25,500 for females. The per capita income for the town was $18,575. About 3.8% of families and 5.2% of the population were below the poverty line, including 2.8% of those under age 18 and 2.0% of those age 65 or over.

== Communities and locations in the town ==
- Beatty Corners – A location on County Road 126 in the southern part of the town.
- Benedict – A hamlet east of North Broadalbin, on County Road 110 at County Road 138.
- Broadalbin – Most of the village of Broadalbin is in the town of Broadalbin; a small portion is in the town of Mayfield.
- Fish House – A hamlet at the shore of Great Sacandaga Lake, in the northeastern corner of Broadalbin at the junction of County Roads 109 and 110.
- Gorthey Corners – A location southwest of North Broadalbin on County Road 110.
- Hill Corners – A location in the southwestern part of the town on County Road 107.
- Hoesville – A hamlet at the eastern town line on County Road 107.
- Honeywell Corners – A location in the southeastern section of the town at the end of what is now Honeywell Corners Road (Opelka Road) and Ridge Road.
- Mills Corners – A location north of NY-29, at the present intersection of Old State Road and Eagles Road (rt. 138). Also known as "Flea Hill".
- North Broadalbin (formerly "Averys" and "Spencers Corners") – A hamlet on the shore of Great Sacandaga Lake and County Road 110.
- Sand Island – A small island in the Great Sacandaga Lake, north of North Broadalbin.
- Steeles Corners – A location north of Mills Corners.
- Stever Mill – A location east of Broadalbin village on NY-29.
- Union Mills – A hamlet near the eastern town line on County Road 138. It was founded by the construction of a saw mill in 1827.
