= New York State Route 338 (1980–1996) =

Former state highway in New York State

New York State Route 338
- NY 338 highlighted in red

Route information
- Maintained by NYSDOT
- Length: 7.04 mi (11.33 km)
- Existed: April 1, 1980–September 1, 1996

Major junctions
- West end: NY 40 in Argyle
- East end: NY 29 in Greenwich

Location
- Country: United States
- State: New York
- Counties: Washington

Highway system
- New York Highways; Interstate; US; State; Reference; Parkways
← NY 338	→ NY 339

New York State Route 338 (NY 338) was a 7.04-mile-long (11.33 km) state highway in Washington County, New York, in the United States. The western terminus of the route was at NY 40 in South Argyle, a hamlet in the town of Argyle. Its eastern terminus was at NY 29 in Greenwich. NY 338 connected both highways to the hamlet of Cossayuna and nearby Cossayuna Lake in northeast Greenwich.

The entirety of NY 338 was a county road until 1980 when New York State assumed maintenance over the highway and designated it as NY 338. It was given back to Washington County in 1996 and is now County Route 49 (CR 49).

== Route description ==
NY 338 began at an intersection with NY 40 in South Argyle, a hamlet within the town of Argyle. The highway headed eastward, passing over hills and intersecting with several local roadways. As NY 338 approached Cossayuna Lake and entered the town of Greenwich, it intersected with CR 48, the primary roadway along the western edge of the lake. NY 338 continued east along the southern extents of the waterbody to the lakeside hamlet of Cossayuna, then turned south toward the hamlet of East Greenwich. The highway passed Browns Mountain to the east and Carter Pond to the west before terminating at an intersection with NY 29 on the banks of the Batten Kill west of East Greenwich.

== History ==
The routing of NY 338 was originally a county road maintained by Washington County. On April 1, 1980, ownership of the highway was transferred to the state of New York as part of a larger highway maintenance swap between the state and Washington County. The route was then designated as NY 338 by the New York State Department of Transportation (NYSDOT). As part of being taken over, Washington County and NYSDOT agreed to replace a bridge on NY 149 in Smith's Basin, which would become maintained by the county. However, it took 16 years after the deal was agreed to (1994) for the bridge to be replaced, resulting in NYSDOT maintaining both NY 338 and NY 149 during this time period. The state pressured Washington County to make good on its end of the deal by taking over NY 149 with the bridge complete. However, that never came about. Instead, NYSDOT went to court to force Washington County to make good. Instead, a deal was struck in 1995 where NYSDOT would retain NY 149 while the county would get NY 338 instead.

NY 338 remained a state highway until September 1, 1996, when it was returned to Washington County as part of a swap that transferred the portion of NY 149 between U.S. Route 4 in Kingsbury and NY 40 in Hartford from the county to the state. The NY 338 designation was removed as a result and its former routing became CR 49.

== Major intersections ==
The entire route was in Washington County.

Location	mi	km	Destinations	Notes
Town of Argyle	0.00	0.00	NY 40	Hamlet of South Argyle
Town of Greenwich	7.04	11.33	NY 29	
1.000 mi = 1.609 km; 1.000 km = 0.621 mi

== See also ==
- List of county routes in Washington County, New York
