= New York State Route 29A =

Highway in New York

New York State Route 29A
- Map of Capital District in New York with NY 29A highlighted in red and NY 920J in blue

Route information
- Auxiliary route of NY 29
- Maintained by NYSDOT and the city of Gloversville
- Length: 35.48 mi (57.10 km)
- Existed: 1930–present

Major junctions
- West end: NY 29 in Salisbury
- NY 30A east of Gloversville
- East end: NY 29 in Broadalbin

Location
- Country: United States
- State: New York
- Counties: Herkimer, Fulton

Highway system
- New York Highways; Interstate; US; State; Reference; Parkways
← NY 29	→ NY 30

New York State Route 29A (NY 29A) is a state highway in the western portion of the Capital District of New York in the United States. The western terminus of the route is at an intersection with NY 29 in the Herkimer County hamlet of Salisbury Center. Its eastern end is at another junction with NY 29 about 36 miles (58 km) to the east near the Fulton County hamlet of Vail Mills. NY 29A enters Gloversville via Rose Street and continues through downtown on Fulton Street.

Originally, NY 29A turned right on Saratoga Boulevard and continued via Steele Avenue Extension to NY 29 about 2 miles (3.2 km) away. Later, NY 29A was taken off Saratoga Boulevard, and was concurrent with NY 30A to its crossing with Steele Avenue Extension, following Steele Avenue Extension after that. In 1980, NY 29A was removed from Steele Avenue Extension as well as the concurrency with NY 30A. Instead, it continued east on Turkey Farm Road, which meant no turns, to its present terminus at NY 29 west of Vail Mills.

== Route description ==
NY 29A begins at a fork from NY 29 in the hamlet of Salisbury Center (in the town of Salisbury). NY 29A proceeds east through the residential hamlet, turning northeastward at a junction with Emmonsburg Road (unsigned County Route 130 (CR 130)). Here, the route leaves Sailsbury Center and proceeds through the dense woods of Herkimer County. Paralleling CR 130 from a distance, NY 29A begins paralleling East Canada Creek before turning northeast into the hamlet of Stratford, crossing into the Adirondack Park. At the junction with Cemetery Road in Stratford, NY 29A turns eastward and crosses over the East Canada Creek and into Fulton County.

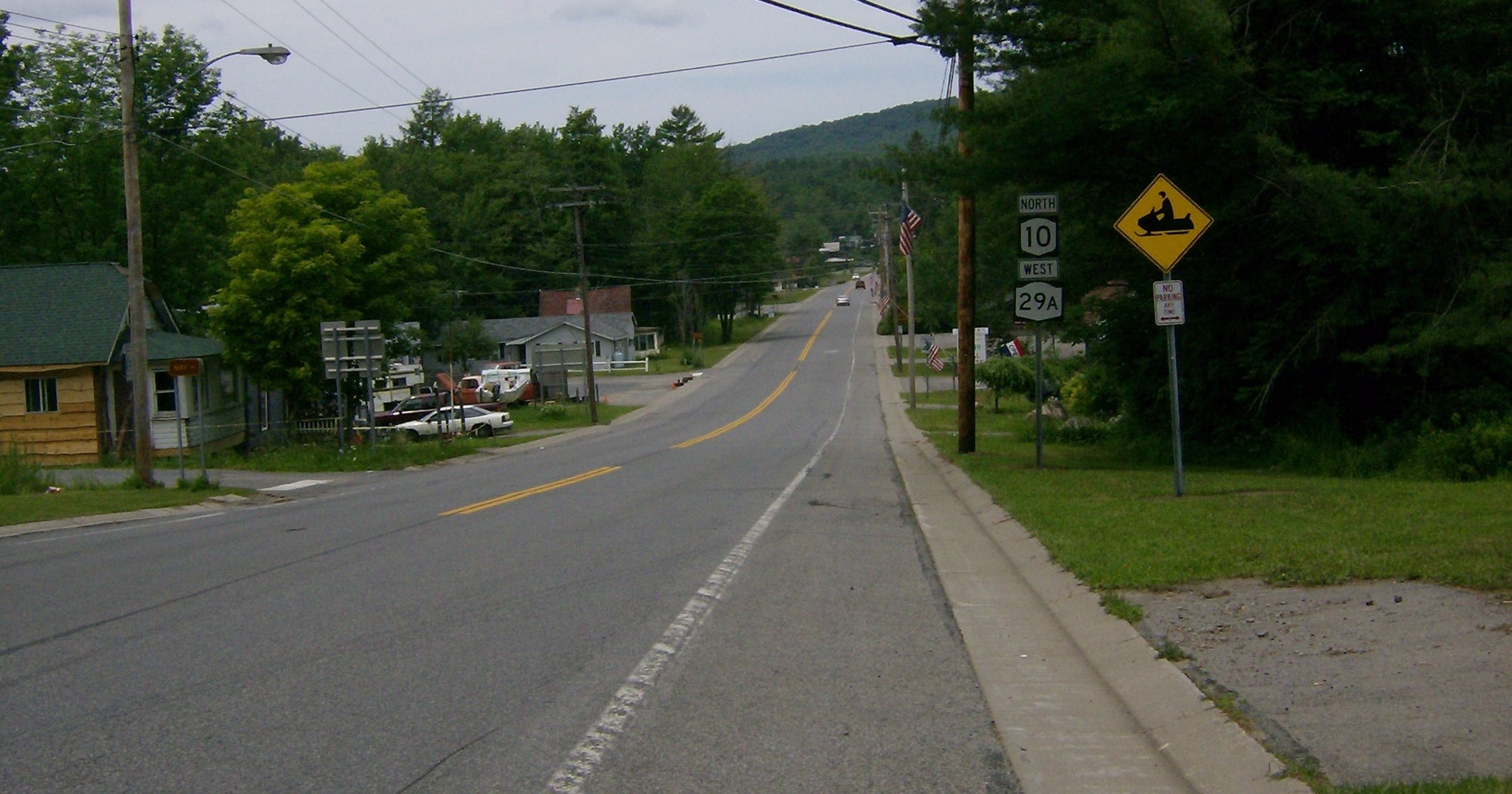
NY 10 and NY 29A through the hamlet of Caroga Lake

Now in the town of Stratford, NY 29A continues east through the woods of the Adirondack Park, becoming a two-lane woods road. This retains itself for several miles, making a short stint to the southeast and northeast near Pleasant Lake. After Pleasant Lake, the route returns to its general west-east configuration, continuing through the dense woods of the Adirondack Park. The route passes south of Nine Corner Lake and crosses into the town of Caroga, where it reaches a junction with NY 10 at the southern end of Pine Lake. NY 10 and NY 29A become concurrent through Caroga, turning southward through the park. At the junction with Point Breeze Road, the routes turn southeast along Canada Lake, entering the namesake hamlet of Canada Lake.

Running southeast along the eastern shores of Canada Lake, NY 10 and NY 29A remain a two-lane park roadway, bypassing the many lakeside residences along the shore. Just south of Irving Pond Road, the routes cross into the hamlet of Wheelerville, where it passes the Nick Stoner Municipal Golf Course. and soon crosses a junction with CR 112 and CR 111 (London Bridge Road). Just after CR 111, the routes turn southeast into the hamlet of Caroga Lake, running close to the shore of West Caroga Lake. Through the hamlet, the routes become the main street, forking in the center, with NY 10 turning southwest and NY 29A continuing southeast out of Caroga Lake. Continuing through the park, NY 29A soon passes East Caroga Lake, and past multiple residences along the highway and on multiple side streets.

Continuing southeast through the town of Caroga, NY 29A passes a junction with CR 137 (Beech Ridge Road). The route soon returns to the dense woods of the Adirondack Park, passing nearby Peck Lake. Just south of Peck Lake, NY 29A crosses out of the Adirondack Park and into the town of Johnstown. Passing Mud Lake, the route remains through dense woods, but passing more residences as it continues southeast. NY 29A soon reaches the hamlet of Meco, where it crosses CR 122 and CR 101 intersect. Turning east out of Meco, the surroundings of NY 29A change to more residences as the route approaches the city of Gloversville.

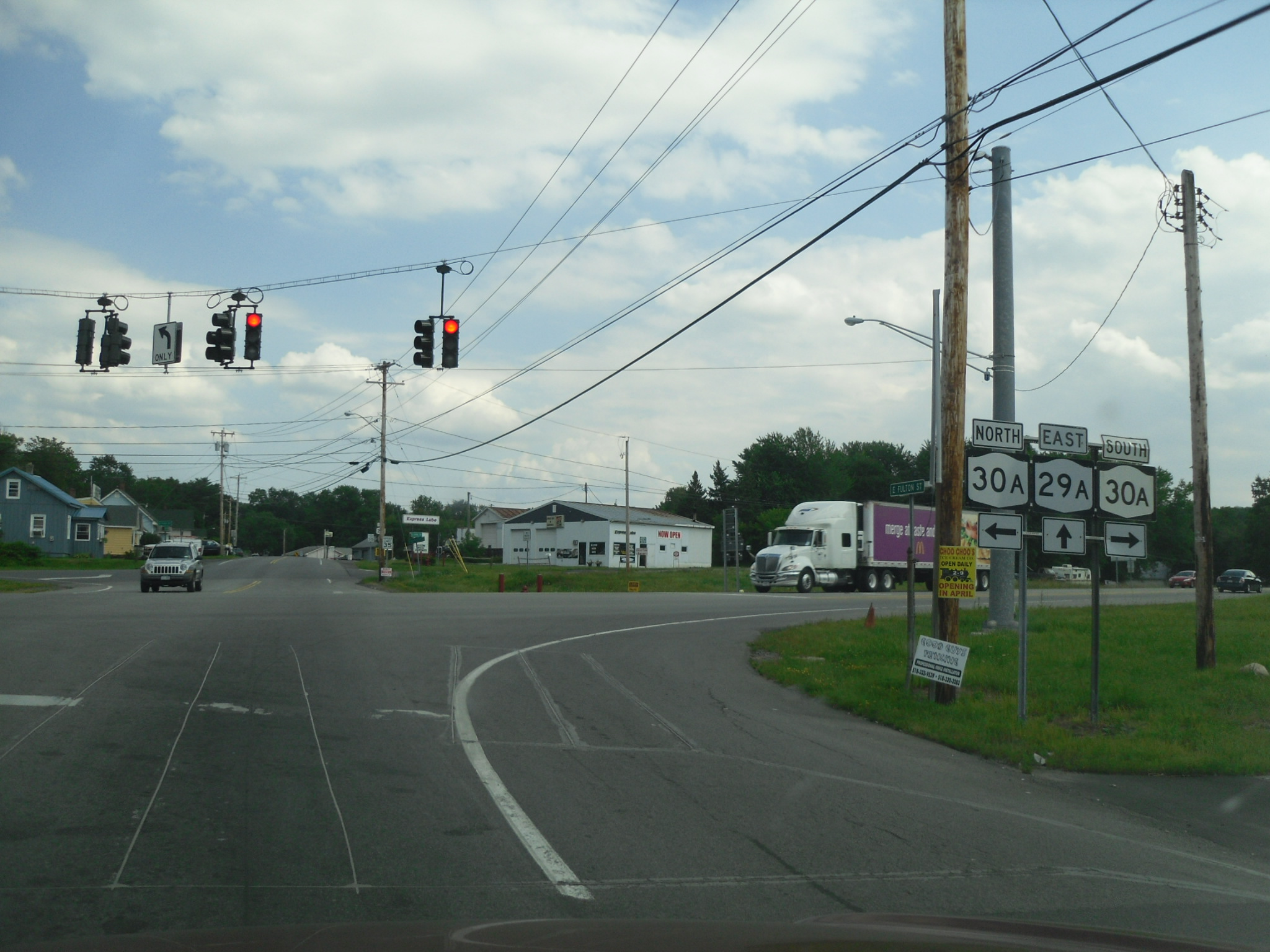
NY 29A east at the junction with NY 30A in Johnstown

Entering Gloversville, NY 29A gains the moniker of Rose Street until the junction with Fulton, where it turns eastward. NY 29A continues onto West Fulton Street, becoming the main west-east road through Gloversville, passing multiple businesses. The route crosses over Cayadutta Creek, soon entering downtown Gloversville, where it meets the southern terminus of NY 309 (Bleecker Street) and soon changes to East Fulton Street. Continuing east along East Fulton, NY 29A becomes a two-lane commercial street, soon passing the northern end of Prospect Hill Cemetery. After the cemetery, the route becomes residential in nature, soon leaving the city for the town of Johnstown once again. Almost immediately after crossing the town line, NY 29A meets an at-grade intersection with NY 30A in the hamlet of Berkshire.

Now known as Turkey Farm Road, NY 29A continues southeast through Johnstown, becoming a two-lane residential street into the hamlet of Progress. After Progress, the route becomes more rural, soon crossing into the town of Mayfield. At the junction with Sandhill Road, the route re-enters dense woods and turns southeast through Mayfield, reaching a junction with NY 29 in front of the Holland Meadows Golf Course. This junction marks the eastern terminus of NY 29A in the town of Broadalbin.

== History ==
NY 29A was assigned as part of the 1930 renumbering of state highways in New York. The route initially followed its current alignment from Salisbury to downtown Gloversville, where it turned southeast to follow Saratoga Boulevard and Steele Avenue Extension to NY 29 in the town of Johnstown. When the NY 30A arterial was completed in the mid-1950s, NY 29A was rerouted to remain on East Fulton Street to the Arterial, where it turned south and overlapped NY 30A to its intersection with the original route.

On April 1, 1980, ownership and maintenance of Turkey Farm Road from the Gloversville city line to NY 29 just west of Vail Mills was transferred from Fulton County to the state of New York as part of a highway maintenance swap between the two levels of government. NY 29A was realigned to follow the new state highway—reaching NY 29 3 miles (5 km) farther east than before—while the portion of its former routing on Steele Avenue Extension south of the Gloversville city line became NY 920J, an unsigned reference route 2.08 miles or 3.35 kilometres in length. Reference markers along NY 920J still read "29A" for its former designation.

== Future ==
NYSDOT has explicitly reserved the NY 435 designation as a replacement for the section of NY 29A between NY 10 and NY 30A. No timetable has been established for the redesignation.

== Major intersections ==
County	Location	mi	km	Destinations	Notes
Herkimer	Salisbury	0.00	0.00	NY 29 – Dolgeville, Little Falls, Middleville, Herkimer	Western terminus; hamlet of Salisbury Center
Herkimer	Salisbury	0.10	0.16	Mechanic Street ( NY 921G)	Northern terminus of unsigned NY 921G; former NY 928; hamlet of Salisbury Center
Fulton	Caroga	14.62	23.53	NY 10 north – Speculator	Northern terminus of NY 10 / NY 29A overlap; hamlet of Pine Lake
Fulton	Caroga	19.87	31.98	CR 112 – Bleecker, Benson, Northville, Mayfield, Edinburg, Corinth, Hadley, Lake Luzerne, Lake George	
Fulton	Caroga	19.97	32.14	NY 10 south to I-90 Toll / New York Thruway – Johnstown, Ephratah, Palatine Bridge, Canajoharie	Southern terminus of NY 10 / NY 29A overlap; hamlet of Caroga Lake
Fulton	Town of Johnstown	19.87	31.98	CR 101 / CR 122 to NY 29 / NY 30A / NY 309 / I-90 Toll / New York Thruway – Johnstown, Fonda, Fultonville, Bleecker, Mayfield	Hamlet of Meco
Fulton	Gloversville	29.70	47.80	NY 309 north (Bleecker Street) – Bleecker	Southern terminus of NY 309
Fulton	Gloversville	30.75	49.49	NY 920J (Saratoga Boulevard)	Northern terminus of unsigned NY 920J; former routing of NY 29A
Fulton	Town of Johnstown	31.05	49.97	NY 30A to I-90 Toll / New York Thruway – Mayfield, Johnstown, Fonda, Fultonville	Access to hospital via NY 30A north
Fulton	Town of Mayfield	35.48	57.10	NY 29 – Johnstown, Broadalbin, Saratoga, Schuylerville	Eastern terminus
1.000 mi = 1.609 km; 1.000 km = 0.621 mi: Concurrency terminus
