= New York State Route 29 =

Highway in New York

New York State Route 29
- NY 29 highlighted in red, and NY 920C in blue

Route information
- Maintained by NYSDOT and the cities of Johnstown and Saratoga Springs
- Length: 94.79 mi (152.55 km)
- Existed: mid-1920s–present

Major junctions
- West end: NY 28 / NY 169 in Middleville
- NY 10 near Rockwood State Forest; NY 67 / NY 30A in Johnstown; NY 30 in Vail Mills; US 9 / NY 50 / NY 9N / NY 9P to I-87 in Saratoga Springs; US 4 / NY 32 in Schuylerville
- East end: NY 22 in Salem

Location
- Country: United States
- State: New York
- Counties: Herkimer, Fulton, Saratoga, Washington

Highway system
- New York Highways; Interstate; US; State; Reference; Parkways
← NY 28N	→ NY 29A

New York State Route 29 (NY 29) is a state highway extending for 94.79 miles (152.55 km) across the eastern portion of the U.S. state of New York. The western terminus of the route is at NY 28 and NY 169 in Middleville, Herkimer County. The eastern terminus of the route is at NY 22 just south of Salem, Washington County. NY 29 also serves the cities of Johnstown and Saratoga Springs and intersects four major north–south roadways: NY 10, NY 30, U.S. Route 9, and U.S. Route 4.

When the NY 29 designation was created in the 1920s, the route extended from Barneveld in the west to Salem in the east. The Trenton-Middleville segment became part of an extended NY 28 in 1930. Since that time, the route has remained virtually unchanged, excluding minor realignments in Fulton County.

== Route description ==
=== Herkimer County ===
NY 29 begins at an intersection with NY 28 and NY 169 in Middleville, a small village situated on West Canada Creek in western Herkimer County. The route heads east, passing out of the village and into the towns of Fairfield and Salisbury, where NY 29 intersects NY 170 and NY 170A, respectively, on opposite sides of the town line.

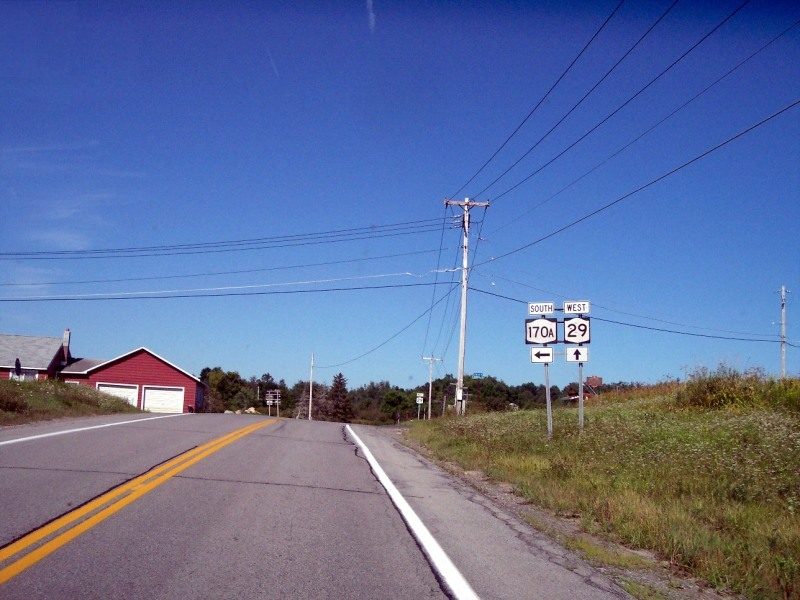
Approaching NY 170A on NY 29 westbound

Past NY 170A, as well as the hamlet of Salisbury centered around the junction, NY 29 continues to Salisbury Center. In the center of the community, NY 29A, a northerly alternate to NY 29, splits off and heads east toward the southernmost reaches of Adirondack Park. NY 29, however, curves south, paralleling Spruce Creek to the village of Dolgeville, located on the Herkimer-Fulton County line. Within the village, NY 29 meets NY 167 prior to crossing over the East Canada Creek (and entering Fulton County) and leaving Dolgeville.

=== Fulton County ===
Once in Fulton County, NY 29 turns southeast as it heads through Oppenheim. In the hamlet of Oppenheim, located midway between the limits of Dolgeville and Ephratah, the route meets the northern end of the short NY 331, a route leading to the hamlet of Crum Creek to the south. Farther east, NY 29 begins to turn to the east as it passes into Ephratah. Although only 5.5 miles (8.9 km) of NY 29 is located within the town, the route overlaps NY 10, a major north–south route, for roughly 1.3 miles (2.1 km) near the eastern town line prior to entering the town of Johnstown.

Just across the town line, NY 29 intersects NY 10A, an alternate route of NY 10 around both the Ephratah hamlet of Rockwood and nearby Rockwood Lake. NY 29 continues on, passing north of the Cork Center Reservoir and south of the smaller Cold Brook Reservoir before entering the city of Johnstown as West State Street. At Green Street, NY 29 bears right on William Street, then joins with NY 67 at East Main Street. After crossing downtown, the concurrency ends with NY 67 following East State Street toward Amsterdam. NY 29 then reaches Comrie Avenue, turning left to join with NY 30A briefly to an intersection with Briggs Street, a westward extension of the major business section of that stretch of Comrie Avenue. NY 29 turns east here to leave the city; however, west of NY 30A, Briggs Street is state-maintained as well as NY 920C (an unsigned reference route) for an additional 0.25 miles (0.40 km) to where the street crosses a tributary of Hale Creek. This portion of the street is generally wider than that of the city-maintained portion. Several businesses are accessed on both sides, as well as a side entrance to the nearby Johnstown Arterial Plaza. The Jansen Avenue Elementary School playground is also along this route.

East of Johnstown, NY 29 heads northeast, intersecting Steele Avenue Extension (unsigned NY 920J and the former eastern terminus of NY 29A) just west of the Mayfield town line. NY 29 continues into Mayfield, meeting both the current eastern terminus of NY 29A and NY 30 in the vicinity of the hamlet of Vail Mills. Past Mayfield, NY 29 passes through both the village and town of Broadalbin before crossing into Saratoga County.

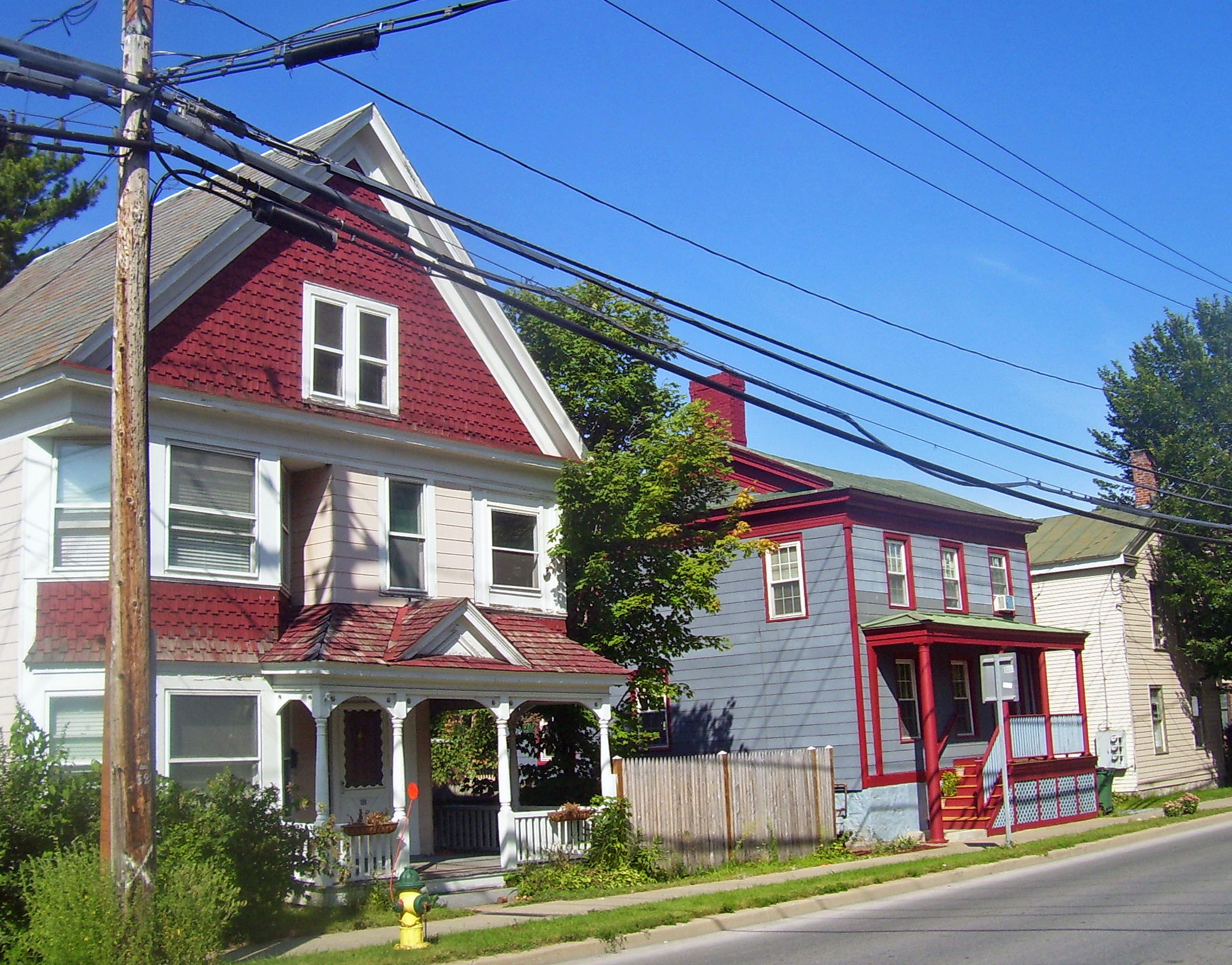
Washington Street, Saratoga Springs

=== Saratoga and Washington counties ===
For its first few miles in Saratoga County, NY 29 roughly parallels the Galway-Providence town line as it heads eastward through a largely rural area of the county. Upon crossing into Milton, the route initially curves south to serve the hamlet of Rock City Falls before resuming an easterly track south of the Milton-Greenfield town line into the Saratoga Springs city limits. At first, the land surrounding NY 29 is largely undeveloped; however, the amount of open space rapidly declines as the route continues toward the city center. Once in the core of the city, NY 29 becomes Washington Street and continues east for several blocks to Broadway, here carrying U.S. Route 9 and NY 50. NY 29 turns north, overlapping both routes to Church Street. Here, both NY 9N and the concurrency between US 9, NY 29, and NY 50 terminate, with NY 29 continuing east from the intersection as the "General Philip Schuyler Memorial Highway", named for Philip Schuyler, a general in the American Revolution. Just outside the city center, NY 29 passes under Interstate 87 with no access; the missing connection is made via NY 9P a short distance to the south.

The memorial designation stays with NY 29 as it exits Saratoga Springs and parallels Fish Creek to Schuylerville, where it intersects U.S. Route 4 and NY 32. Here, the highway name comes to an end; however, NY 29 continues on, overlapping US 4 and NY 32 south for two blocks to Ferry Street. NY 29 then follows Ferry Street out of the village and across the Hudson River on the Schuylerville Bridge into Washington County.

Near the village of Greenwich in the town of the same name, NY 29 briefly overlaps NY 40 across the Batten Kill before splitting north of the river and entering the village as Main Street. The route retains the name up to Salem Street, at which point NY 29 turns east onto Salem while Main becomes NY 372. NY 29 exits the village of Greenwich soon after and begins to parallel the northern bank of the Batten Kill as it heads northeastward through the town of Greenwich. Near the hamlet of East Greenwich, the path of the route and of the river becomes more easterly as NY 29 intersects County Route 49 (CR 49), once the southeastern terminus of NY 338. From East Greenwich, NY 29 and the Batten Kill cross into Salem, where NY 29 comes to an end at NY 22 south of the village of Salem.

== History ==
In 1908, the New York State Legislature created Route 26, an unsigned legislative route that extended from Little Falls to Barneveld via Dolgeville and Salisbury. Also created at this time was Route 37, which ran from Johnstown to Ballston Spa via Galway. Route 26 roughly followed what is now NY 29 from Dolgeville west to Fairfield while Route 37 utilized the NY 29 corridor from Johnstown to the modern junction with NY 147 at Kimball Corners. In 1910, Route 26 was reconfigured to begin in Mohawk and follow what is now NY 169 and NY 28 between Little Falls and Barneveld. Route 37, meanwhile, was altered twice by 1912 to begin in Dolgeville and follow modern NY 29 east to Johnstown. East of Johnstown, it was tentatively routed on Fulton County's CR 107 and current NY 30 to Broadalbin, where Route 37 rejoined the path of modern NY 29 and followed it east to Saratoga Springs.

Much of what is now NY 29 east of Saratoga Springs was included in the legislative route system during the 1910s. In 1911, the portion of modern NY 29 west of the Hudson River in Schuylerville was designated as part of Route 43, a new route that extended south from Schuylerville to Stillwater. The segment of current NY 29 between Saratoga Springs and Grange Hall Road west of Schuylerville became part of Route 25 by 1920. On March 1, 1921, Routes 25, 37, and 43 were reconfigured as part of a partial renumbering of New York's legislative route system. Route 37 was extended southwest to Little Falls over Route 26's original alignment and realigned between Johnstown and Broadalbin to use the path of modern NY 29. Route 43, meanwhile, was renumbered to Route 44 and extended west to Saratoga Springs over Route 25, which was altered to use current U.S. Route 9 from Glens Falls to Saratoga Springs.

NY 29 was assigned in the mid-1920s, utilizing the routing of legislative Route 37 from Dolgeville to Saratoga Springs, the alignment of Route 44 between Saratoga Springs and Schuylerville, and the original routing of Route 26 between Fairfield and Dolgeville. The route also extended farther out in both directions as it initially began in Barneveld and ended south of Salem. In between Barneveld and Fairfield, NY 29 passed through Poland and Middleville. In the 1930 renumbering of state highways in New York, the segment of NY 29 between Barneveld and Middleville became part of an extended NY 28 while NY 29 was truncated southeastward to Middleville.

East of Johnstown, NY 29 originally zig-zagged across its current route. Some of the old alignments remain as side roads or access routes, including Schoolhouse Road, Schabacker Road, and Circle Road in the town of Johnstown. The old route also followed current Fulton County Route 155 through Vail Mills, where it overlaps briefly with NY 30 and continues into the village of Broadalbin. In Broadalbin, original NY 29 entered as West Main Street, turning right onto Mill Street, then left on Saratoga Avenue, leaving the village and meeting the current routing. East of Broadalbin, other original alignments included Stevers Mill Roads, Mueller Road, and Old State Road. The current alignment between Broadalbin and the Saratoga County line was built in the early 1950s while the bypass around Vail Mills and Broadalbin was completed c. 1961.

== Major intersections ==
County	Location	mi	km	Destinations	Notes
Herkimer	Middleville	0.00	0.00	NY 28 / NY 169 south to I-90 Toll / New York Thruway – Herkimer, Little Falls, Poland	Western terminus, northern terminus of NY 169
Herkimer	Fairfield	3.65	5.87	NY 170 south to I-90 Toll / New York Thruway – Little Falls	Northern terminus of NY 170
Herkimer	Salisbury	6.71	10.80	NY 170A south to I-90 Toll / New York Thruway – Little Falls	Northern terminus of NY 170A
Herkimer	Salisbury	9.67	15.56	NY 29A east – Stratford, Caroga, Gloversville	Western terminus of NY 29A; hamlet of Salisbury Center
Herkimer	Salisbury	9.77	15.72	Mechanic Street ( NY 921G)	Southern terminus of unsigned NY 921G; former NY 928; hamlet of Salisbury Center
Herkimer	Dolgeville	12.51	20.13	NY 167 south to I-90 Toll / New York Thruway – Little Falls	Northern terminus of NY 167
Fulton	Oppenheim	17.65	28.40	NY 331 south – St. Johnsville	Northern terminus of NY 331
Fulton	Ephratah	26.84	43.19	NY 10 south to I-90 Toll / New York Thruway – Canajoharie, Palatine Bridge	Western terminus of NY 10 / NY 29 overlap
Fulton	Ephratah	28.10	45.22	NY 10 north – Caroga	Eastern terminus of NY 10 / NY 29 overlap; hamlet of Rockwood
Fulton	Town of Johnstown	29.95	48.20	NY 10A north – Caroga	Southern terminus of NY 10A
Fulton	City of Johnstown	36.16	58.19	NY 67 west (West Main Street)	Western terminus of NY 29 / NY 67 overlap
Fulton	City of Johnstown	36.47	58.69	NY 67 east (East State Street)	Eastern terminus of NY 29 / NY 67 overlap
Fulton	City of Johnstown	36.91	59.40	NY 30A south (Comrie Avenue) to I-90 Toll / New York Thruway – Fonda, Fultonville	Southern terminus of NY 29 / NY 30A overlap
Fulton	City of Johnstown	37.34	60.09	NY 30A north (Briggs Street) – Gloversville, Mayfield	Northern terminus of NY 29 / NY 30A overlap
Fulton	Town of Johnstown	37.97	61.11	NY 920D / Harrison Street Extension	
Fulton	Town of Johnstown	40.81	65.68	NY 920J / Steele Avenue Extension – Gloversville	Former eastern terminus of NY 29A
Fulton	Town of Mayfield	44.01	70.83	NY 29A west (Turkey Farm Road) – Gloversville, Caroga, Stratford	Eastern terminus of NY 29A
Fulton	Town of Mayfield	45.29	72.89	NY 30 to I-90 Toll / New York Thruway – Mayfield, Amsterdam	Roundabout; hamlet of Vail Mills
Saratoga	Town of Galway	54.25	87.31	NY 147 south – Scotia	Northern terminus of NY 147; hamlet of Kimball Corners
Saratoga	Saratoga Springs	68.70	110.56	US 9 south / NY 50 south (Broadway) to NY 9P / I-87	Southern terminus of US 9 / NY 29 and NY 29 / 50 overlaps
Saratoga	Saratoga Springs	68.93	110.93	US 9 north / NY 50 north / NY 9N north (Church Street) / NY 29 Truck east to I-87	Northern terminus of US 9 / NY 29 and NY 29 / 50 overlaps; southern terminus of NY 9N; western terminus of NY 29 Truck
Saratoga	Saratoga Springs	70.20	112.98	Henning Road To NY 9P / I-87 south	
Saratoga	Saratoga	75.94	122.21	NY 29 Truck west (Louden Road) to NY 50 / I-87	Eastern terminus of NY-29 Truck
Saratoga	Saratoga			CR 338 (Monument Road)	Former northern terminus of NY 338
Saratoga	Schuylerville	79.71	128.28	US 4 north / NY 32 north (Broadway) – Fort Edward	Northern terminus of US 4 / NY 29 and NY 29 / NY 32 overlaps
Saratoga	Schuylerville	80.00	128.75	US 4 south / NY 32 south – Schuyler House, Saratoga Battlefield	Southern terminus of US 4 / NY 29 and NY 29 / NY 32 overlaps
Washington	Easton	82.77	133.21	NY 40 south – Troy	Southern terminus of NY 29 / NY 40 overlap
Washington	Town of Greenwich	83.78	134.83	NY 40 north – Argyle	Northern terminus of NY 29 / NY 40 overlap; hamlet of Middle Falls
Washington	Village of Greenwich	85.13	137.00	NY 372 east (Main Street)	Western terminus of NY 372
Washington	Town of Greenwich	92.13	148.27	CR 49 – Cossayuna Lake	Former eastern terminus of NY 338
Washington	Town of Salem	95.48	153.66	NY 22 – Salem, Cambridge	Eastern terminus
1.000 mi = 1.609 km; 1.000 km = 0.621 mi: Concurrency terminus

== NY 29A ==

NY 29A (35.48 miles or 57.10 kilometres) is an alternate route of NY 29 between Salisbury and Broadalbin, accessing Gloversville. It was assigned as part of the 1930 renumbering of state highways in New York.

== NY 29 Truck ==
New York State Route 29 Truck
- Location: Saratoga Springs

New York State Route 29 Truck is a truck route bypassing NY 29 eastbound in Downtown Saratoga Springs
