= New York State Route 338 (1940s–1980) =

Former state highway in New York State

New York State Route 338

Route information
- Maintained by NYSDOT
- Length: 1.35 mi (2.17 km)
- Existed: 1940s–April 1, 1980

Major junctions
- West end: NY 29 in Northumberland
- East end: US 4 / NY 32 in Schuylerville

Location
- Country: United States
- State: New York
- Counties: Saratoga

Highway system
- New York Highways; Interstate; US; State; Reference; Parkways
← NY 337	→ NY 338

New York State Route 338 (NY 338) was a state highway in Saratoga County, New York, in the United States. It served as a bypass of the village of Schuylerville, linking NY 29 west of the village to U.S. Route 4 (US 4) and NY 32 in the southern portion of Schuylerville. West of the village limits, NY 338 was known as Monument Road; within Schuylerville, it was named Burgoyne Street. NY 338 was assigned in the 1940s and removed in 1980, at which time the NY 338 designation was reassigned to another roadway in Washington County. The former routing of NY 338 outside of the Schuylerville village limits is now County Route 338 (CR 338).

== Route description ==
NY 338 began at an intersection with NY 29 in Northumberland, west of the Schuylerville village limits. The highway headed to the southeast as Monument Road, passing over small hills as it encircled the western extents of Schuylerville. At the Cemetery of the Visitation BMV, site of the Saratoga Monument, NY 338 merged with Burgoyne Road and became Burgoyne Street. Past this point, NY 338 continued east into southern Schuylerville, where it terminated at an intersection with US 4 and NY 32.

== History ==
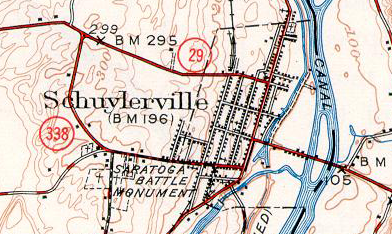
1949 quadrangle of Schuylerville marking the entire length of NY 338.

NY 338 was assigned in the 1940s to a southeastern bypass of Schuylerville extending from NY 29 to US 4 and NY 32. The route was not maintained by the state of New York, however: it was maintained by Saratoga County (from NY 29 to the Schuylerville village line) and by the village of Schuylerville (the portion within Schuylerville). On April 1, 1980, the NY 338 designation was removed and reassigned to another roadway in Washington County that had been transferred from the county to the state. The portion of former NY 338 from NY 29 to the Schuylerville village line is now CR 338.

== Major intersections ==
The entire route was in Saratoga County.

Location	mi	km	Destinations	Notes
Northumberland	0.00	0.00	NY 29	
Schuylerville	1.35	2.17	US 4 / NY 32	
1.000 mi = 1.609 km; 1.000 km = 0.621 mi

== See also ==
- List of county routes in Saratoga County, New York
