= Oppenheim, New York =

- Town
- Location within New York Location within the United States
- Coordinates: 43°4′54″N 74°42′3″W
- Country: United States
- State: New York
- County: Fulton

Government
  - Type: Town Council
  - Town Supervisor: Cynthia Breh (R)
  - Town Council: Members' List: • Kathleen E. Montana (R); • Nicholas Vasil (R); • Brian Miller (R); • Robert G. Norris Jr. (R)

Area
  - Total: 56.44 sq mi (146.18 km^{2})
  - Land: 56.14 sq mi (145.39 km^{2})
  - Water: 0.31 sq mi (0.79 km^{2})
- Elevation: 1,120 ft (340 m)

Population (2010)
  - Total: 1,924
  - Estimate (2016): 1,858
  - Density: 33.1/sq mi (12.78/km^{2})
- Time zone: UTC-5 (Eastern (EST))
  - Summer (DST): UTC-4 (EDT)
- ZIP Codes: 13329 (Dolgeville); 13452 (St. Johnsville)
- FIPS code: 36-035-55101
- GNIS feature ID: 0979314
- Website: townofoppenheim.com

Oppenheim is a town in Fulton County, New York, United States. The town is in the southwestern corner of the county and is east of Utica. The population was 1,745 at the 2020 census.

== History ==
The town was first settled by Palatine Germans from Oppenheim, Germany. The town of Oppenheim was established in 1808 from the town of Palatine in Montgomery County, before the formation of Fulton County. In the 1810 U.S. Federal Census, the name of the town was spelled, "Upenheim." When Fulton County was formed in 1838, the south part of Oppenheim was used to form the town of St. Johnsville, which remained in Montgomery County.

The early occupations of townspeople were associated with dairy and cheese-making activities.

Beaversprite, a nature refuge, was founded in Oppenheim in the 1930s.

== Geography ==
According to the United States Census Bureau, the town has a total area of 56.4 square miles (146.2 km^{2}), of which 56.1 square miles (145.4 km^{2}) is land and 0.31 square miles (0.8 km^{2}), or 0.54%, is water.

The northern part of the town is in the Adirondack Park. The western town line is the border of Herkimer County, and the southern town boundary is the border of Montgomery County.

East Canada Creek is a stream defining the western town line. The creek flows out of the Adirondacks to join the Mohawk River, south of Oppenheim.

New York State Route 29 is an east-west highway across Oppenheim. New York State Route 331, a north-south highway, intersects NY 29 at Oppenheim village.

== Demographics ==
Historical population
Census	Pop.	Note	%±
1820	3,045		—
1830	3,660		20.2%
1840	2,169		−40.7%
1850	2,315		6.7%
1860	2,363		2.1%
1870	1,950		−17.5%
1880	1,845		−5.4%
1890	1,563		−15.3%
1900	1,258		−19.5%
1910	1,241		−1.4%
1920	1,182		−4.8%
1930	1,147		−3.0%
1940	1,202		4.8%
1950	1,190		−1.0%
1960	1,223		2.8%
1970	1,431		17.0%
1980	1,806		26.2%
1990	1,848		2.3%
2000	1,774		−4.0%
2010	1,924		8.5%
2016 (est.)	1,858		−3.4%
U.S. Decennial Census

As of the census of 2000, there were 1,774 people, 685 households, and 493 families residing in the town. The population density was 31.5 inhabitants per square mile (12.2/km^{2}). There were 858 housing units at an average density of 15.2 per square mile (5.9/km^{2}). The racial makeup of the town was 98.31% White, 0.73% African American, 0.17% Native American, 0.23% Asian, 0.11% from other races, and 0.45% from two or more races. Hispanic or Latino of any race were 0.68% of the population.

There were 685 households, out of which 32.6% had children under the age of 18 living with them, 54.0% were married couples living together, 8.8% had a female householder with no husband present, and 28.0% were non-families. 23.1% of all households were made up of individuals, and 8.9% had someone living alone who was 65 years of age or older. The average household size was 2.54 and the average family size was 2.94.

In the town, the population was spread out, with 25.0% under the age of 18, 7.3% from 18 to 24, 29.6% from 25 to 44, 25.0% from 45 to 64, and 13.1% who were 65 years of age or older. The median age was 38 years. For every 100 females, there were 106.0 males. For every 100 females age 18 and over, there were 102.6 males.

The median income for a household in the town was $31,284, and the median income for a family was $34,306. Males had a median income of $26,289 versus $19,427 for females. The per capita income for the town was $13,504. About 9.7% of families and 12.4% of the population were below the poverty line, including 14.8% of those under age 18 and 6.3% of those age 65 or over.

== Communities and locations in Oppenheim ==
- Crum Creek – A hamlet near the southern town line on NY 331 and Crum Creek; and a stream that flows through the town southward through the town. The former Crum Creek Evangelical Lutheran Church was listed on the National Register of Historic Places in 2010.
- Doxtater Corner – A hamlet in the northwestern part of the town, northeast of Rasbach Corners.
- Dolgeville (formerly "Brocketts Bridge") – Part of the village of Dolgeville is at the western town line at East Canada Creek and NY 29.
- Ingham Mills – A hamlet on the western town boundary on County Road 108.
- Kringsbush – A hamlet by the south town line in the southwestern part of the town.
- Kyser Lake – A wide part of the East Canada Creek, north of Ingham Mills.
- Lotville – A hamlet in the northern part of the town, located between Doxtater Corners and Phipps Corners.
- Middle Sprite – A hamlet by the northern town boundary, inside the Adirondack Park.
- Oppenheim – The hamlet of Oppenheim at the junction of NY 29 and NY 331, west of Crum Creek.
- Phipps Corners – A location east of Lotville and north of Oppenheim hamlet.
- Rasbach Corners – A hamlet in the northwestern part of the town, east of Dolgeville.
