= Kingsboro, New York =

- hamlet
- Location within New York
- Coordinates: 43°04′02″N 74°20′28″W
- Country: United States
- State: New York
- County: Fulton
- Municipalities: City of Gloversville, Town of Johnstown
- Elevation: 899 ft (274 m)
- Time zone: UTC-5 (Eastern (EST))
  - Summer (DST): UTC-4 (EDT)
- Area code: 518
- GNIS feature ID: 954676

Kingsboro (also Kingsborough) is a neighborhood in the northern part of the city of Gloversville, and an adjacent unincorporated community in the town of Johnstown in Fulton County, New York, United States.
