= New York State Route 309 =

State highway in Fulton County, New York

New York State Route 309
- NY 309 highlighted in red

Route information
- Maintained by NYSDOT and the city of Gloversville
- Length: 6.56 mi (10.56 km)
- Existed: 1930–present

Major junctions
- South end: NY 29A in Gloversville
- North end: CR 112 in Bleecker

Location
- Country: United States
- State: New York
- Counties: Fulton

Highway system
- New York Highways; Interstate; US; State; Reference; Parkways
← NY 308	→ NY 310

New York State Route 309 (NY 309) is a 6.56-mile-long (10.56 km) state highway located entirely in Fulton County, New York, in the United States. The southern terminus of the route is at an intersection with NY 29A in Gloversville. The northern terminus of the route is at a junction with Lily Lake Road in the hamlet of Bleecker, where the highway continues north and west as County Route 112 (CR 112) to London Bridge Road (CR 111, near NY 10 and NY 29A) at West Caroga Lake in the town of Caroga. Part of NY 309 and all of CR 112 is located within Adirondack Park. NY 309 was assigned to its current alignment as part of the 1930 renumbering of state highways in New York.

== Route description ==
NY 309 begins at an intersection with NY 29A and Cayadutta Street in downtown Gloversville. The route heads northward as Frontage Road, passing large commercial buildings and City Hall as it heads north through the city. At Spring Street, the route turns onto Spring Street—two blocks north of NY 29A-the surroundings become more residential as the commercial structures are replaced by homes. The route then takes a left at Bleecker Street two blocks later. The route continues on, crossing Cayadutta Creek between 8th Avenue and McLaren Street before turning left, leaving Bleecker Street at West 11th Avenue. At this point, the amount of development along NY 309 drops substantially as it parallels Cayadutta Creek and heads northwestward out of the city limits. At this point, maintenance of the route shifts from the city of Gloversville to the New York State Department of Transportation (NYSDOT).

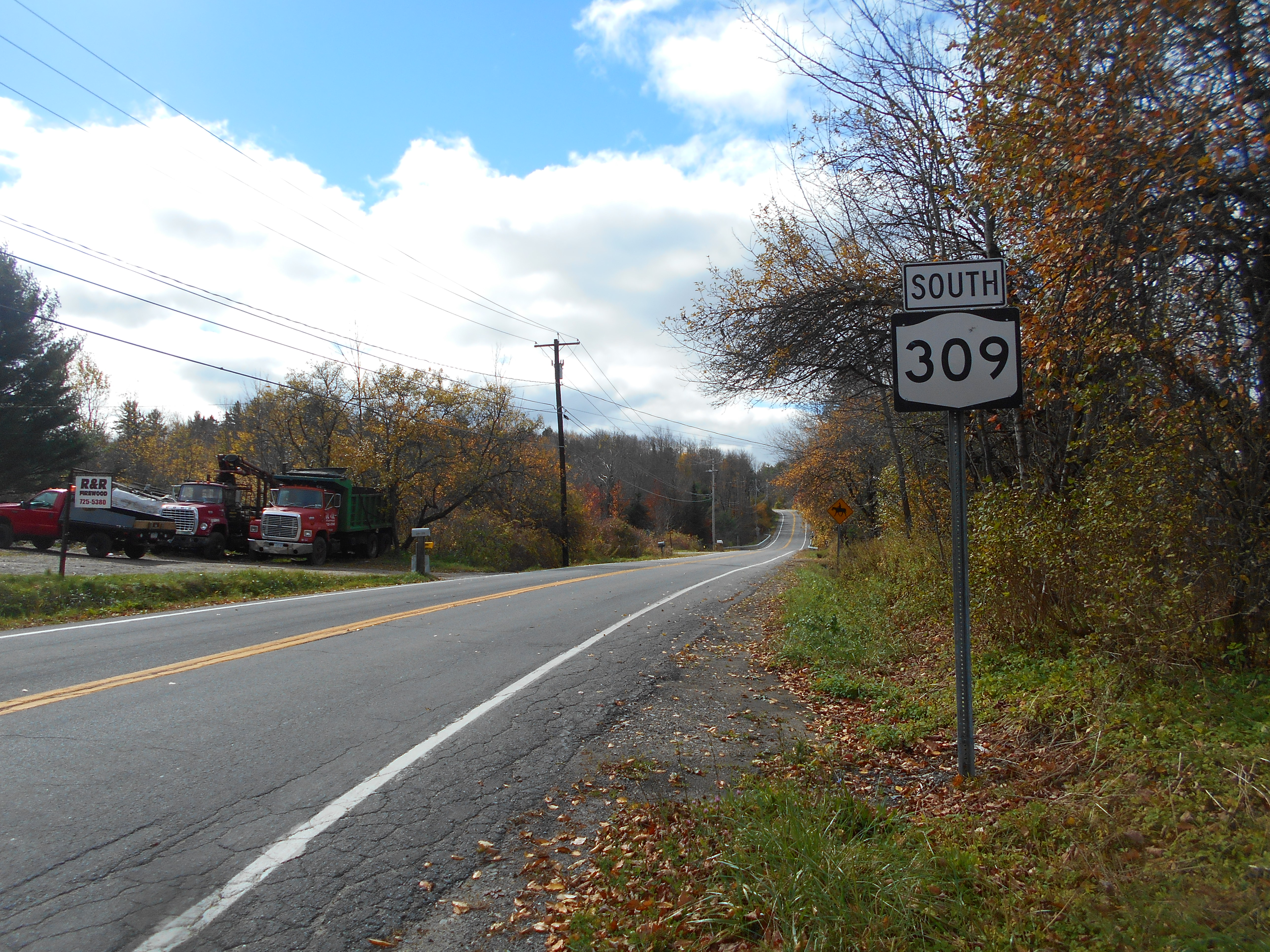
NY 309 southbound at Bleecker

Now in the town of Johnstown, the route winds its way northwestward as it follows Cayadutta Creek through an area of hilly terrain south of Adirondack Park. Development along the route largely ends at the intersection with West State Street; however, a pair of isolated homes are situated on NY 309 about 0.25 miles (0.40 km) to the northeast ahead of an intersection with CR 122, an east–west highway that serves the Fulton County Infirmary a short distance to the west. The route continues to wind its way through the mountains to the hamlet of West Bush, where Cayadutta Creek ends amidst a small cluster of houses. The route turns north at this point, passing a handful of homes before leaving the community upon passing through a narrow pass between two hills.

North of West Bush, the route rapidly ascends in elevation as it climbs up the side of a large mountain. Along this stretch, the route veers to the northwest and southeast as it heads through an area of wilderness. NY 309 crosses the Blue Line into Adirondack Park near the mountain's summit. Upon reaching the top of the mountain, the highway straightens out and heads northward for roughly 0.5 miles (0.8 km) across the hill's plateau. Upon reaching the other side, the road gradually descends in elevation as it passes by Mountain Lake and enters the town of Bleecker. The highway continues its northeastward descent into the small lakeside hamlet of Bleecker, where NY 309 ends at an intersection with Lily Lake Road. At this point, the roadway becomes CR 112.

== History ==
Part of CR 112 was originally part of an old Indian trail that went from Johnstown to Hamilton County via Bleecker. At some point, part of the trail in the vicinity of Bleecker was converted into a plank road that served several locations and churches north of Bleecker. Meanwhile, NY 309 was assigned as part of the 1930 renumbering of state highways in New York to a connector highway between the city of Gloversville and the hamlet of Bleecker.

Until 2009, NY 309 followed Bleeker Street all the way till its southern terminus at NY 29A, when it was shifted two blocks to its current alignment.

== Major intersections ==
The entire route is in Fulton County.

Location	mi	km	Destinations	Notes
Gloversville	0.00	0.00	NY 29A (West Fulton Street)	Southern terminus
Bleecker	6.56	10.56	CR 112 north – Caroga / Lily Lake Road	Northern terminus; southern terminus of CR 112
1.000 mi = 1.609 km; 1.000 km = 0.621 mi

== See also ==
- List of county routes in Fulton County, New York
