= New York State Route 331 =

Highway in New York

New York State Route 331
- Map of the Mohawk Valley with NY 331 highlighted in red

Route information
- Maintained by Montgomery County and NYSDOT
- Length: 3.10 mi (4.99 km)
- Existed: 1930–present

Major junctions
- South end: Crum Creek Road / Kennedy Road in St. Johnsville
- North end: NY 29 in Oppenheim

Location
- Country: United States
- State: New York
- Counties: Montgomery, Fulton

Highway system
- New York Highways; Interstate; US; State; Reference; Parkways
| ← NY 330 | → NY 332 |

New York State Route 331 (NY 331) is a north–south state highway located in the Mohawk Valley of New York in the United States. The route extends for 3.10 miles (4.99 km) from an intersection with Kennedy Road in the Montgomery County town of St. Johnsville to a junction with NY 29 in the Fulton County town of Oppenheim. Heading northbound, state maintenance of NY 331 begins at the Montgomery–Fulton county line as the Montgomery County section of the route is county-maintained as part of County Route 57 (CR 57). NY 331 was assigned as part of the 1930 renumbering of state highways in New York.

== Route description ==
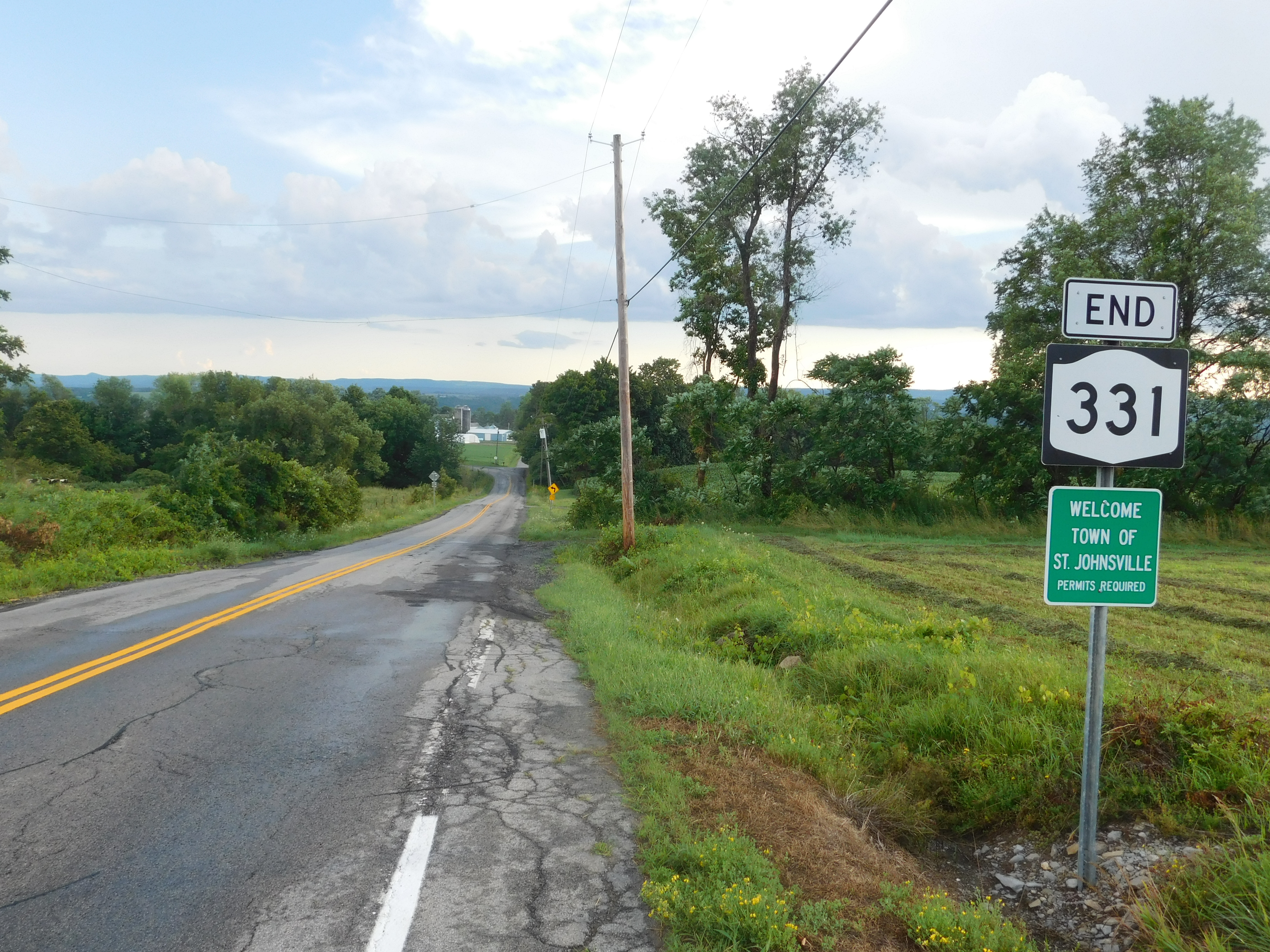
NY 331's signed southern terminus at the Montgomery–Fulton county line. The route officially continues to the intersection of Crum Creek and Kennedy roads, visible in the background.

NY 331 officially begins at the intersection of Kennedy and Crum Creek (CR 57) roads in the Montgomery County town of St. Johnsville. The route heads northeast as a narrow, two-lane road through a rural, open area as a county-maintained highway, overlapping with the unsigned CR 57 for 0.17 miles (0.27 km) until the Montgomery–Fulton county line. State maintenance of NY 331 begins at the boundary, which is signed as NY 331's southern terminus. Past the county line, the route widens slightly as it traverses rolling hills in a rural part of the town of Oppenheim. NY 331 soon reaches the small hamlet of Crum Creek, where it connects to the eastern terminus of CR 108.

Past Crum Creek, the route continues on a generally northeastward track through the town, running across numerous, mostly undeveloped hills to reach a junction with the east end of CR 150. The rolling, open terrain continues on as NY 331 crosses Crum Creek prior to entering the vicinity of the hamlet of Oppenheim, where NY 331 serves a farm and a line of homes leading into the center of the community. NY 331 ends here at a junction with NY 29 while the route's right-of-way continues north toward Adirondack Park as a town highway named North Road.

== History ==
On October 28, 1916, the state of New York awarded a contract to improve what is now NY 331 in Fulton County to state highway standards. The road cost $60,489 to rebuild (equivalent to $972,145 in 2025), and it was added to the state highway system on November 4, 1920, as unsigned State Highway 621 (SH 621). In the 1930 renumbering of state highways in New York, hundreds of state-maintained highways were assigned a posted route number for the first time. One of these was SH 621, which was designated NY 331. The route has continued into Montgomery County for a short distance as a county-maintained road since at least 1970.

== Major intersections ==
| County | Location | mi | km | Destinations | Notes |
|---|---|---|---|---|---|
| Montgomery | Town of St. Johnsville | 0.00 | 0.00 | Crum Creek Road (CR 57) | Continues south beyond Kennedy Road |
| Montgomery | Town of St. Johnsville | 0.00 | 0.00 | Kennedy Road | |
| Fulton | Oppenheim | 3.10 | 4.99 | NY 29 – Dolgeville, Johnstown | Northern terminus; hamlet of Oppenheim |
1.000 mi = 1.609 km; 1.000 km = 0.621 mi
