= Vail Mills, New York =

- Hamlet
- Location within the state of New York
- Coordinates: 43.0500735°N 74.2179100°W
- Country: United States
- State: New York
- County: Fulton
- Town: Mayfield
- Elevation: 781 ft (238 m)
- Time zone: UTC-5 (Eastern (EST))
  - Summer (DST): UTC-4 (EDT)
- Area code: 518

Vail Mills is a hamlet in the Town of Mayfield in Fulton County, New York, United States. It is located in the southeastern part of the town on New York State Route 30 (NY 30).
