= Mayfield, New York =

- Town
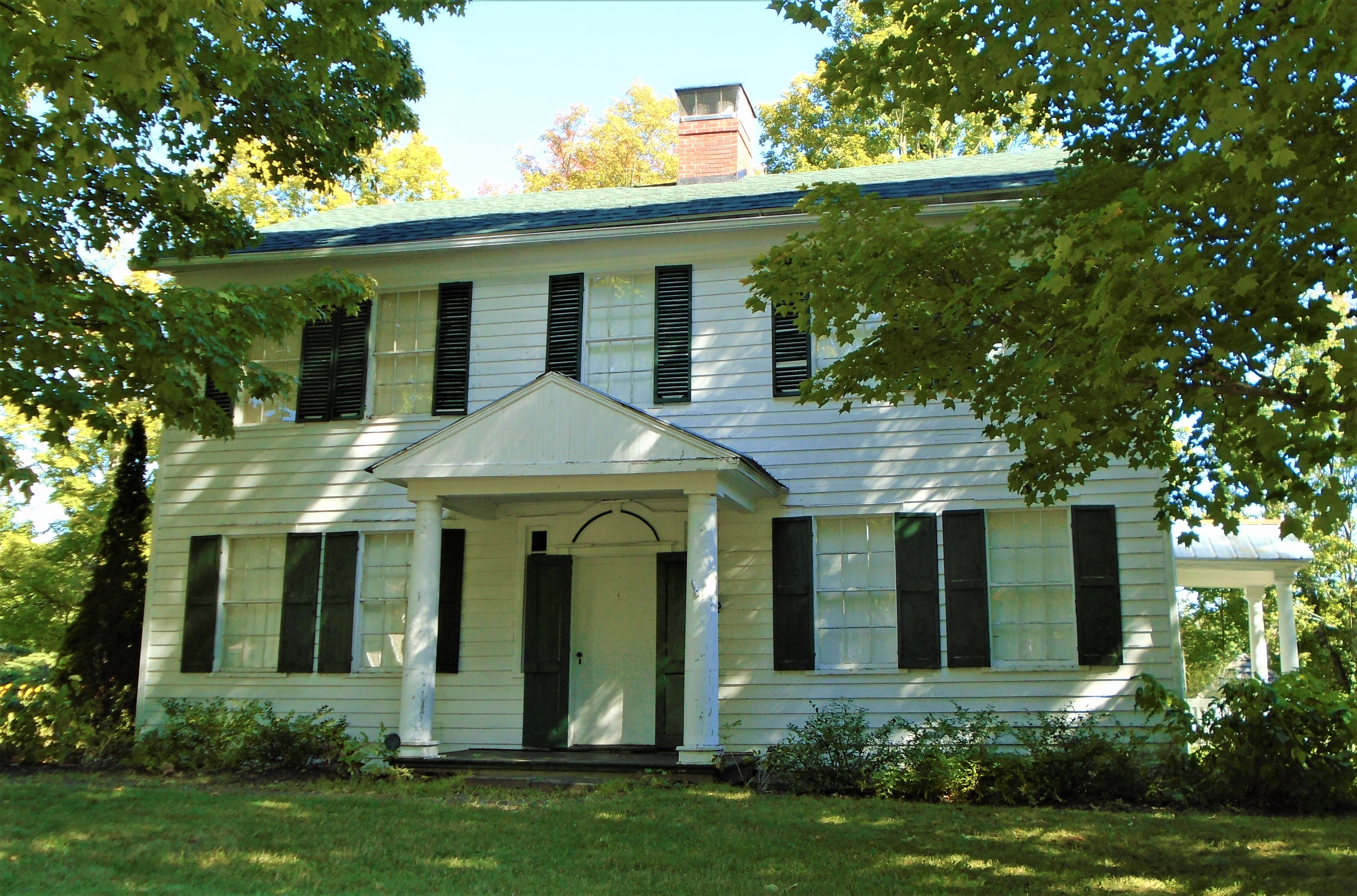
- The Oliver Rice House, a historic home museum in Mayfield

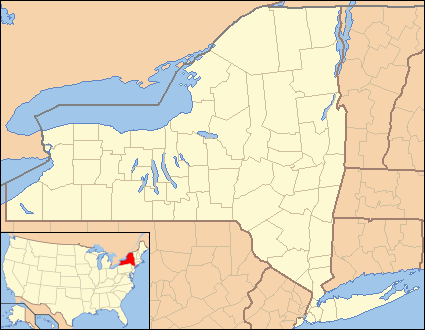
- Location within the state of New York
- Coordinates: 43°07′29″N 074°15′36″W
- Country: United States
- State: New York
- County: Fulton

Government
  - Type: Town Council
  - Town Supervisor: Brandon Lehr (R)
  - Town Council: Members' List: • Lesley Lanzi (R); • Thomas Ruliffson (R); • Jack Putman (R); • Ralph Desiderio (C)

Area
  - Total: 64.68 sq mi (167.53 km^{2})
  - Land: 58.39 sq mi (151.22 km^{2})
  - Water: 6.30 sq mi (16.31 km^{2})
- Elevation: 837 ft (255 m)

Population (2020)
  - Total: 6,146
  - Estimate (2023): 6,094
  - Density: 104/sq mi (40.3/km^{2})
- Time zone: UTC-5 (Eastern (EST))
  - Summer (DST): UTC-4 (EDT)
- ZIP Codes: 12117 (Mayfield); 12078 (Gloversville); 12025 (Broadalbin); 12095 (Johnstown); 12010 (Amsterdam)
- Area code: 518
- FIPS code: 36-035-46217
- GNIS feature ID: 979206
- Website: townofmayfieldny.gov

Mayfield is a town in Fulton County, New York, United States, northeast of Gloversville and Johnstown. The town contains a village also named Mayfield. The population of the town was 6,495 at the 2010 census.

== History ==
The land that is now the town was formed by portions of several colonial land grants, including: The Mayfield Patent (1770); Col. Daniel Claus' Patent (1770); Cpt. Norman McLeod's Patent (1770); Lt Benjamin Roberts' Patent (1770); The Kingsborough Patent (1753); The Kayaderosseras Patent (1701); Sacondaga Patent (1741); Glen's Purchase (1770); the Glen, Bleecker, and Lansing Patent (1793); and Chase's Patent (1792).

The first European settlements began under the authority of Sir William Johnson, 1st Baronet. His exploits as the British Superintendent of Indian Affairs acquainted him with the lands which were the territory of the Mohawk nation of the Iroquois Confederacy. A settlement known as Philadelphia Bush formed in the southern part of the present town in the early 1760s, and in the eastern part of the present town, settlement was simultaneously started in the basin of the Sacandaga Valley. A settlement on the Mayfield Patent began in 1772, and Johnson erected a grist mill on the Mayfield creek the following year or year after.

The settlements were situated on the war path taken by Sir John Johnson and his Loyalist and Mohawk raiding forces during the Revolutionary War, which devastated the early pioneers. A fort, known as the Sacondaga Blockhouse, was erected in May 1779 to protect the remaining settlers from further raids. However, due to several attacks, the Mayfield area was mostly abandoned by the end of the war.

The town was established in 1793 from the town of Caughnawaga in Montgomery County before the formation of Fulton County in 1838. It was one of the first three such towns formed, and was fully organized on April 1, 1794. Part of Mayfield was taken in 1805 to form the town of Wells (now in Hamilton County). An additional part of Mayfield was added to Wells in 1812. Mayfield was reduced once again in 1842 to form the town of Perth. Mayfield reached its present size in 1860, when a northern section was annexed by Hamilton County to create the town of Benson.

The early economy was based on agriculture as well as lumber and leather production. Limestone was a bountiful resource with several quarries and kilns in operation in the 19th century. The Fonda, Johnstown and Gloversville Railroad operated within the town from 1875 to 1984. Passenger service ended in the 1930s, and the railroad was operated solely for industrial purposes until it ceased operations.

Roughly six square miles (~4000 acres) of private land in Mayfield was acquired by the state through eminent domain for the creation of the Great Sacandaga Lake in 1930. In 1931, the Adirondack Park was expanded by the state to include the majority of the town. Since that time, the local economy has depended on tourism.

The Oliver Rice House located on Old NY 30 was listed on the National Register of Historic Places in 1995.

== Geography ==
According to the United States Census Bureau, the town has a total area of 64.7 square miles (167.5 km^{2}), of which 58.4 square miles (151.2 km^{2}) is land and 6.3 square miles (16.3 km^{2}), or 9.74%, is water. Mayfield is mostly within the Adirondack Park and is on the southwestern shore of Great Sacandaga Lake. New York State Route 30 is an important north–south highway in Mayfield. NY-30 intersects New York State Route 30A at Riceville. New York State Route 349 is an east–west highway in the southern part of the town. East–west highways New York State Route 29 and New York State Route 29A converge in the southern part of Mayfield, west of Vail Mills.

== Demographics ==
Historical population
Census	Pop.	Note	%±
1820	2,025		—
1830	2,614		29.1%
1840	2,615		0.0%
1850	2,429		−7.1%
1860	2,367		−2.6%
1870	2,241		−5.3%
1880	2,231		−0.4%
1890	2,181		−2.2%
1900	2,136		−2.1%
1910	2,065		−3.3%
1920	1,806		−12.5%
1930	2,077		15.0%
1940	2,734		31.6%
1950	3,145		15.0%
1960	3,613		14.9%
1970	4,522		25.2%
1980	5,439		20.3%
1990	5,738		5.5%
2000	6,427		12.0%
2010	6,495		1.1%
2020	6,146		−5.4%
2023 (est.)	6,094	▼	−0.8%
U.S. Decennial Census

As of the census of 2000, there were 6,432 people, 2,535 households, and 1,804 families residing in the town. The population density was 110.1 inhabitants per square mile (42.5/km^{2}). There were 3,211 housing units at an average density of 55.0 per square mile (21.2/km^{2}). The racial makeup of the town was 97.99% White, 0.39% Black or African American, 0.22% Native American, 0.42% Asian, 0.47% from other races, and 0.51% from two or more races. Hispanic or Latino of any race were 0.87% of the population.

There were 2,535 households, out of which 32.7% had children under the age of 18 living with them, 55.7% were married couples living together, 10.3% had a female householder with no husband present, and 28.8% were non-families. 23.1% of all households were made up of individuals, and 10.8% had someone living alone who was 65 years of age or older. The average household size was 2.53 and the average family size was 2.95.

In the town, the population was spread out, with 25.2% under the age of 18, 6.4% from 18 to 24, 28.2% from 25 to 44, 26.1% from 45 to 64, and 14.1% who were 65 years of age or older. The median age was 39 years. For every 100 females, there were 98.2 males. For every 100 females age 18 and over, there were 95.6 males.

The median income for a household in the town was $37,982, and the median income for a family was $42,289. Males had a median income of $30,326 versus $22,105 for females. The per capita income for the town was $17,972. About 5.9% of families and 8.6% of the population were below the poverty line, including 11.9% of those under age 18 and 7.4% of those age 65 or over.

== Communities and locations in the town ==
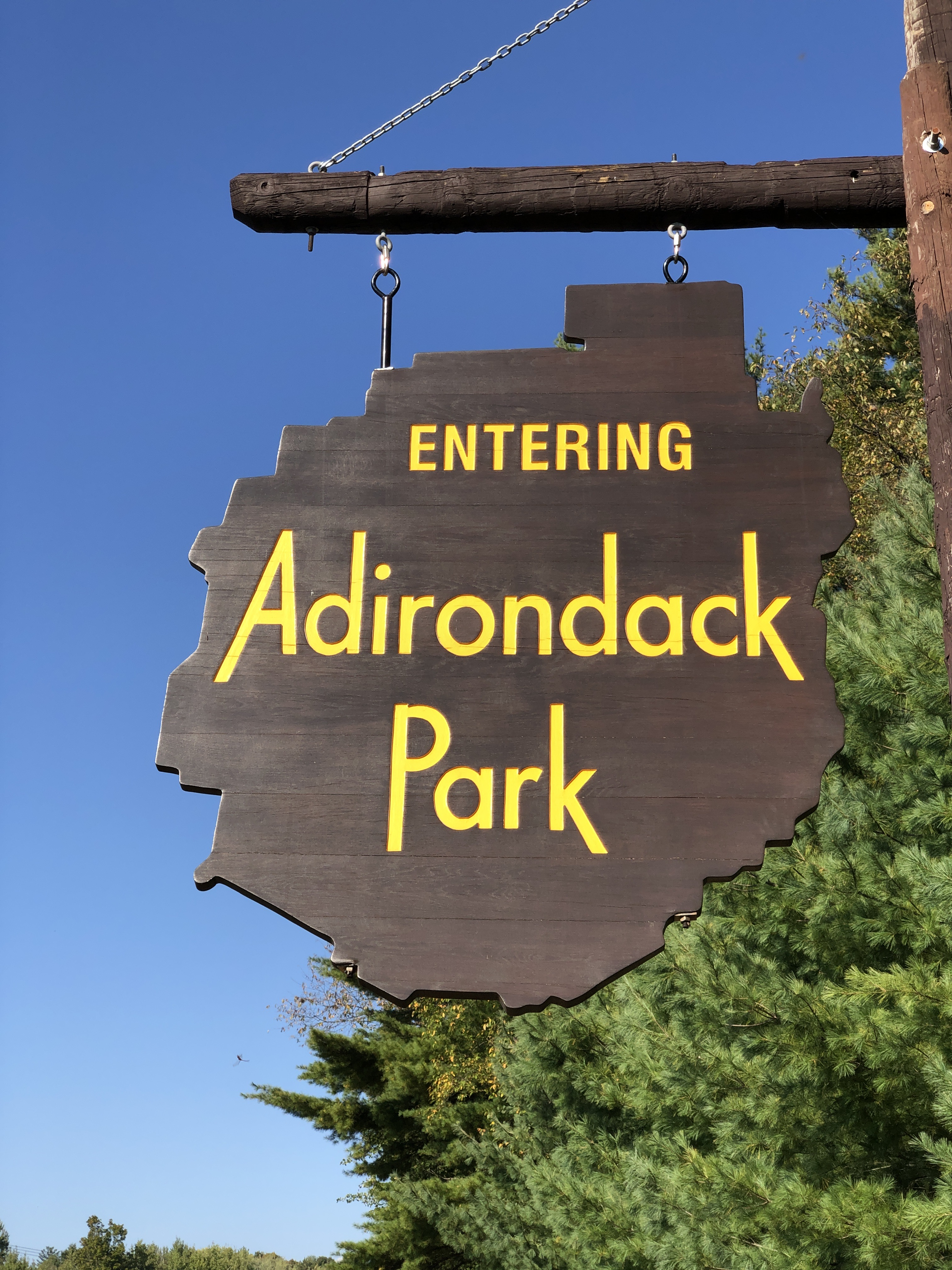
Sign along northbound NY 30 in Mayfield entering Adirondack Park

=== Inhabited locations ===
- Broadalbin – A small western part of the village of Broadalbin, located on NY-29, is inside the town of Mayfield.
- Broadalbin Junction – A hamlet by the western town line on NY-30A southwest of Riceville.
- Cranberry Creek – A hamlet in the northeastern corner of the town on NY-30. A stream called Cranberry Creek flows into Great Sacandaga Lake at the village. Had a post office from 1819 to 1930. Discontinued due to the Sacandaga Reservoir.
- Dennies Hollow – A hamlet north of Mayfield village on NY-30.
- Jackson Summit – A location west of Mayfield village at the southern end of the Jackson Summit Reservoir. Had a post office from 1858 to 1863.
- Mayfield – The village of Mayfield is in the southeastern part of the town. Post office established 1819.
- Munsonville – A hamlet at the western end of Great Sacandaga Lake, south of Mayfield village. Had a post office from 1874 to 1903. Now underneath the Sacandaga Reservoir.
- Progress – A hamlet in the southwestern part of town on NY-29A.
- Red Bunch Corners – A hamlet in the southern part of the town on NY-30.
- Riceville – A hamlet by the junction of Routes NY-30 and NY-30A. Had a post office from 1833 to 1848.
- Tomantown – A former settlement in the northwestern quarter of Mayfield.
- Vail Mills – A hamlet in the southeastern part of Mayfield on NY-30. Had a post office from 1835 to 1933.
- Wilkins' Corners – A former community near Mayfield village.
- Wood's Hollow – A former community in the southeastern section of town. Also known as Closeville. Now underneath the Sacandaga Reservoir.

=== Geographic locations ===
- Beacon Island – A small island in Great Sacandaga Lake, north of Kunkel Point.
- Bernhardt Mountain – The highest peak in Mayfield, 2293 ft above sea level.
- Cameron Reservoir – A small reservoir near the northern town line.
- Jackson Summit Reservoir – A reservoir located in the northwestern part of the town.
- Kenyetto Creek – A stream in the southeastern section of the town flowing westward, then north into Great Sacandaga Lake.
- Kunkel Point – A projection into Great Sacandaga Lake, north of Vandenburgh Point. The point, and road leading to it, are named for the late Robert S. Kunkel a prominent Gloversville doctor and one of the first people to buy property there. The Point remains in the Kunkel family.
- Mayfield Creek – A stream flowing eastward into Mayfield Lake.
- Mayfield Lake – A small lake south of Mayfield village, connecting to Great Sacandaga Lake.
- Paradise Point – A short projection into Great Sacandaga Lake northeast of Dennies Hollow.
- Scout Island – An island in the southwestern part of Great Sacandaga Lake.
- Vandenburgh Point – A short peninsula into Great Sacandaga Lake, northeast of Munsonville.

=== Landmark ===
- Oliver Rice House – A 1790 historical colonial home, now a museum.
- Sacondaga Blockhouse, a frontier fortification constructed during the American Revolutionary War
