= Johnstown (town), New York =

Johnstown, New York
- Town
- Location within New York
- Coordinates: 43°2′45″N 74°23′11″W
- Country: United States
- State: New York
- County: Fulton

Government
  - Type: Town Council
  - Town Supervisor: Christina VanValkenburgh (R)
  - Town Council: Members' List: • Gregory Satterlee (R); • Amy Ward (R); • Joel Wilson (R); • Paul Catucci (R)

Area
  - Total: 71.3 sq mi (184.7 km^{2})
  - Land: 70.2 sq mi (181.9 km^{2})
  - Water: 1.1 sq mi (2.8 km^{2})
- Elevation: 915 ft (279 m)

Population (2010)
  - Total: 7,098
  - Density: 100/sq mi (39/km^{2})
- Time zone: UTC-5 (Eastern (EST))
  - Summer (DST): UTC-4 (EDT)
- ZIP Codes: 12095 (Johnstown); 12078 (Gloversville); 12068 (Fonda); 13339 (Fort Plain)
- Area code: 518
- FIPS code: 36-38792
- GNIS feature ID: 979111
- Website: townofjohnstown.org

Johnstown is a town located in Fulton County, New York, United States. As of the 2010 census, the town had a population of 7,098. The name of the town is from landowner William Johnson. The town of Johnstown is located on the southern border of the county. It borders on three sides the city of Johnstown and the city of Gloversville.

== History ==
Johnstown was founded by William Johnson, a British military officer and colonial government official, in a region once known as "Kingsborough". Johnson named the settlement after his son, John Johnson, and by 1762 constructed a baronial hall.

In 1781, during the American Revolution, colonial forces, consisting of militia and Oneida allies, were victorious over a mixed force of Loyalists and Native allies. All of the holdings of the Johnson family were forfeited due to the family's allegiance to Britain.

The town of Johnstown was formed in 1793 from the town of Caughnawaga and served as the seat of sprawling Montgomery County, which encompassed a major portion of upstate New York. The town was divided afterwards to form new towns in the county: Mohawk (1837 and now in Montgomery County), Bleecker (1831), and Caroga (1842). In 1772, Johnson constructed a courthouse and jail, partly at his own expense, leading to further development.

The core of the town was incorporated as a village in 1808. Later, in 1895, the village was chartered as the city of Johnstown.

The town was early involved in the tanning of leather and manufacture of leather goods, primarily gloves.

== Geography ==
According to the United States Census Bureau, the town has a total area of 71.3 square miles (184.7 km^{2}), of which 70.2 square miles (181.9 km^{2}) is land and 1.1 square miles (2.8 km^{2}), or 1.52%, is water.

The southern town line is the border of Montgomery County.

New York State Route 29, New York State Route 29A, and New York State Route 67 are east–west highways. New York State Route 30A, a north–south highway, intersects NY-29A in the eastern part of the town, just east of the Gloversville city limits. NY-30A intersects NY-29 in the city of Johnstown. New York State Route 309 is north of Gloversville.

== Demographics ==
Historical population
Census	Pop.	Note	%±
1820	6,527		—
1830	7,700		18.0%
1840	5,409		−29.8%
1850	6,131		13.3%
1860	8,811		43.7%
1870	12,273		39.3%
1880	10,626		−13.4%
1890	3,191		−70.0%
1900	2,661		−16.6%
1910	2,511		−5.6%
1920	1,948		−22.4%
1930	2,612		34.1%
1940	3,561		36.3%
1950	4,153		16.6%
1960	5,120		23.3%
1970	5,750		12.3%
1980	6,719		16.9%
1990	6,418		−4.5%
2000	7,171		11.7%
2010	7,098		−1.0%
2014 (est.)	7,233		1.9%
U.S. Decennial Census

As of the census of 2000, there were 7,166 people, 2,471 households, and 1,840 families residing in the town. The population density was 102.1 inhabitants per square mile (39.4/km^{2}). There were 2,728 housing units at an average density of 38.9 per square mile (15.0/km^{2}). The racial makeup of the town was 92.44% White, 4.63% Black or African American, 0.04% Native American, 0.71% Asian, 1.56% from other races, and 0.61% from two or more races. Hispanic or Latino of any race were 3.28% of the population.

There were 2,471 households, out of which 31.2% had children under the age of 18 living with them, 63.0% were married couples living together, 7.2% had a female householder with no husband present, and 25.5% were non-families. 19.6% of all households were made up of individuals, and 9.9% had someone living alone who was 65 years of age or older. The average household size was 2.56 and the average family size was 2.93.

In the town, the population was spread out, with 21.0% under the age of 18, 7.6% from 18 to 24, 29.8% from 25 to 44, 25.0% from 45 to 64, and 16.6% who were 65 years of age or older. The median age was 40 years. For every 100 females, there were 114.0 males. For every 100 females age 18 and over, there were 116.2 males.

The median income for a household in the town was $39,591, and the median income for a family was $44,167. Males had a median income of $27,940 versus $24,688 for females. The per capita income for the town was $17,910. About 6.9% of families and 9.1% of the population were below the poverty line, including 11.4% of those under age 18 and 6.0% of those age 65 or over.

== Communities and locations in the town ==
- Albany Bush – A former location in the town near Johnstown city.
- Berkshire – A location east of Gloversville on NY-29A.
- Cork – A location near the western town line on NY-29.
- Dennies Crossing – A hamlet northeast of Gloversville on NY-30A.
- Eppie Corners – A location near the western town line on NY-67.
- Fulton County Airport (NY0) – A general aviation airport southeast of Johnstown city.
- Hale Mills – A hamlet east of Johnstown on NY-29.
- Kecks Center – A hamlet west of Johnstown on NY-67.
- Kingsboro – A location in the northern part of Gloversville, extending into the town.
- Meco – A hamlet north of Johnstown and west of Gloversville at the junction of County Roads 101 and 122.
- Pleasant Square – A hamlet directly north of Gloversville, mostly around Phelps Street.
- Progress – A hamlet east of Gloversville, on the eastern town line. The Log Cabin Church was listed on the National Register of Historic Places in 1999.
- Sammonsville – A hamlet by the southern town line on NY-334.
- Smiths Corners – A location northwest of Gloversville near West Bush.
- Tryon Girls Secure Facility – A state correctional facility for girls.
- West Bush – A hamlet northwest of Gloversville.
