= Fulton County, New York =

County in New York, United States

- County
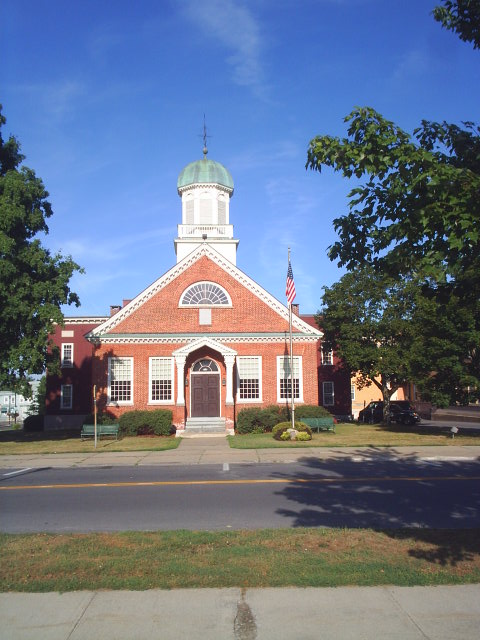
- Fulton County Courthouse

- Flag Seal

- Location within the U.S. state of New York
- Coordinates: 43°07′N 74°25′W
- Country: United States
- State: New York
- Founded: 1838
- Named for: Robert Fulton
- Seat: Johnstown
- Largest city: Gloversville

Area
  - Total: 533 sq mi (1,380 km^{2})
  - Land: 495 sq mi (1,280 km^{2})
  - Water: 37 sq mi (96 km^{2}) 7.0%

Population (2020)
  - Total: 53,324
  - Estimate (2025): 52,216 ▼
  - Density: 107.6/sq mi (41.5/km^{2})
- Time zone: UTC−5 (Eastern)
  - Summer (DST): UTC−4 (EDT)
- Congressional district: 21st
- Website: fultoncountyny.gov

Fulton County is a county in the U.S. state of New York. It forms part of the state's Mohawk Valley region. Its county seat is Johnstown. At the 2020 U.S. census, the county had a population of 53,324. The county is named in honor of Robert Fulton, who is widely credited with developing the first commercially successful steamboat. Fulton Countie's most populated and largest city is Gloversville as of 2026. The county is part of the Mohawk Valley region of the state.

== History ==
In 1838, Fulton County was split off from Montgomery, shortly after the Montgomery county seat was moved to Fonda, New York. The creation of Fulton County was engineered by Johnstown lawyer Daniel Cady, whose wife was a cousin of Robert Fulton. Fulton County was formed on April 18, 1838, by a partition of Montgomery County, resulting in a county with an area of 550 square miles (1,400 km^{2}).

The old Tryon County courthouse, built in 1772, later the Montgomery County courthouse, became the Fulton County Courthouse, where it is New York's oldest operating courthouse. One adjustment has been made to the area of Fulton County. On April 6, 1860, 10 square miles (26 km^{2}) on the northern border was transferred to Hamilton in the vicinity of Sacandaga Park. That resulted in the Fulton County which exists today.

In the mid-18th century, Sir William Johnson, founder of Fort Johnson in Montgomery County and of Johnstown, arrived in what would become Fulton County. Sir William Johnson, 1st Baronet, was an Irish pioneer and army officer in colonial New York, and the British Superintendent of Indian Affairs from 1755 to 1774. His homes, Fort Johnson and Johnson Hall are New York State Historic Sites. Fulton County was also home to Elizabeth Cady Stanton, a central pioneer in America's women's rights movement.

Shortly after the American Revolutionary War, the manufacture of gloves and leather became the area's primary industry. At one point, Johnstown and Gloversville were known as the world's Glove and Leather capital. The largest rise in population and growth came as a result of the fruits of these businesses.

Many residents of Fulton County can trace their ancestry to the glove and leather trades. Today few glovers, tanners, and leather dressers remain in the area, although some companies have adapted to the changes in the market to remain competitive.

== Geography ==
According to the U.S. Census Bureau, the county has a total area of 533 square miles (1,380 km^{2}), of which 495 square miles (1,280 km^{2}) is land and 37 square miles (96 km^{2}) (7.0%) is water. Fulton County is in the central part of the state, northwest of Albany, lying in the southern Adirondack Mountains. Approximately 58% of the county is within the boundaries of Adirondack Park.

=== Adjacent counties ===
- Hamilton County - north
- Saratoga County - east
- Montgomery County - south
- Herkimer County - west

== Demographics ==
Historical population
Census	Pop.	Note	%±
1840	18,049		—
1850	20,171		11.8%
1860	24,162		19.8%
1870	27,064		12.0%
1880	30,985		14.5%
1890	37,650		21.5%
1900	42,842		13.8%
1910	44,534		3.9%
1920	44,927		0.9%
1930	46,560		3.6%
1940	48,597		4.4%
1950	51,021		5.0%
1960	51,304		0.6%
1970	52,637		2.6%
1980	55,153		4.8%
1990	54,191		−1.7%
2000	55,073		1.6%
2010	55,531		0.8%
2020	53,324		−4.0%
2025 (est.)	52,216	▼	−2.1%
U.S. Decennial Census; 1790-1960 1900-1990; 1990-2000 2010-2020

=== 2020 census ===
Fulton County, New York – Racial and ethnic composition Note: the US Census treats Hispanic/Latino as an ethnic category. This table excludes Latinos from the racial categories and assigns them to a separate category. Hispanics/Latinos may be of any race.
Race / Ethnicity (NH = Non-Hispanic)	Pop 1980	Pop 1990	Pop 2000	Pop 2010	Pop 2020	% 1980	% 1990	% 2000	% 2010	% 2020
White alone (NH)	54,106	52,817	52,374	52,110	47,051	98.10%	97.46%	95.10%	93.84%	88.24%
Black or African American alone (NH)	467	614	937	981	966	0.85%	1.13%	1.70%	1.77%	1.81%
Native American or Alaska Native alone (NH)	77	100	93	104	89	0.14%	0.18%	0.17%	0.19%	0.17%
Asian alone (NH)	143	224	291	320	343	0.26%	0.41%	0.53%	0.58%	0.64%
Native Hawaiian or Pacific Islander alone (NH)	x	x	8	11	0	x	x	0.01%	0.02%	0.00%
Other race alone (NH)	55	25	46	55	164	0.10%	0.05%	0.08%	0.10%	0.31%
Mixed race or Multiracial (NH)	x	x	440	687	2,577	x	x	0.80%	1.24%	4.83%
Hispanic or Latino (any race)	305	411	884	1,263	2,134	0.55%	0.76%	1.61%	2.27%	4.00%
Total	55,153	54,191	55,073	55,531	53,324	100.00%	100.00%	100.00%	100.00%	100.00%

=== 2019 American Community Survey ===
The 2019 American Community Survey estimated there were 53,383 residents in the county, down from 55,531 at the 2010 United States census. There were also an estimated 22,439 households, and 29,173 housing units at the 2019 population estimates. The racial makeup of Fulton County was 92.2% non-Hispanic white, 2.2% Black or African American, 0.3% American Indian or Alaska Native, 0.7% Asian American, 1.6% from two or more races, and 3.5% Hispanic or Latino of any race.

Roughly 72% of households were owner-occupied and the median gross rent was $759. There were 2.34 persons per household and 3.1% spoke a language other than English at home. Of the population there were 25.1% from ages 18 to 5 and under, and 20.1% aged 65 and older. The median income for a household in the county was $50,248, and the per capita income was $26,875. Roughly 13% of the county population lived at or below the poverty line.

At the census of 2000, there were 55,073 people, 21,884 households, and 14,509 families residing in the county. The population density was 111 people per square mile (43 people/km^{2}). There were 27,787 housing units at an average density of 56 units per square mile (22/km^{2}). The racial makeup of the county was 95.99% White, 1.80% Black or African American, 0.19% Native American, 0.53% Asian, 0.02% Pacific Islander, 0.56% from other races, and 0.91% from two or more races. 1.61% of the population were Hispanic or Latino of any race. 17.2% were of Italian, 16.4% German, 13.2% Irish, 10.0% English, 8.3% American, 5.8% French and 5.7% Polish ancestry according to Census 2000. 96.1% spoke English and 1.6% Spanish as their first language.

There were 21,884 households, out of which 30.50% had children under the age of 18 living with them, 50.00% were married couples living together, 11.30% had a female householder with no husband present, and 33.70% were non-families. 27.70% of all households were made up of individuals, and 12.90% had someone living alone who was 65 years of age or older. The average household size was 2.43 and the average family size was 2.94.

In the county, the population was spread out, with 24.90% under the age of 18, 7.20% from 18 to 24, 28.10% from 25 to 44, 23.60% from 45 to 64, and 16.30% who were 65 years of age or older. The median age was 39 years. For every 100 females there were 97.10 males. For every 100 females age 18 and over, there were 93.60 males.

The median income for a household in the county was $33,663, and the median income for a family was $39,801. Males had a median income of $29,538 versus $22,173 for females. The per capita income for the county was $16,844. About 9.20% of families and 12.50% of the population were below the poverty line, including 17.50% of those under age 18 and 7.50% of those age 65 or over.

== Transportation ==
Fulton County has seven private airstrips and two public-use airports:

- Fulton County Airport (NY0) – Johnstown
- Dolgeville Airport (1F6) – Dolgeville

Gloversville Transit System provides bus service to parts of Fulton County as well as adjacent Montgomery County. The county's Highways and Facilities Department is headquartered in Johnstown and is charged with maintaining roads, including:

- Overseeing road construction and repair
- Issuing permits to work in county rights-of-way
- Removing snow and ice

Each town and village within Fulton County maintains its own highway department.

=== Major roadways ===
- New York State Route 10
- New York State Route 10A
- New York State Route 29
- New York State Route 29A
- New York State Route 30
- New York State Route 30A
- New York State Route 67
- New York State Route 309
- New York State Route 331
- New York State Route 334
- New York State Route 349
- New York State Route 399
- List of county routes in Fulton County, New York

The former Fonda, Johnstown and Gloversville Railroad was located in Fulton County. The former New York State Route 920C, New York State Route 920D, and New York State Route 920J were located in Fulton County.

== Communities ==
=== Cities ===
- Gloversville
- Johnstown (county seat)

=== Towns ===
- Bleecker
- Broadalbin
- Caroga
- Ephratah
- Johnstown
- Mayfield
- Northampton
- Oppenheim
- Perth
- Stratford

=== Villages ===
- Broadalbin
- Dolgeville
- Mayfield
- Northville

=== Census-designated place ===
- Caroga Lake

=== Hamlet ===
- Kingsboro

== Politics ==
United States presidential election results for Fulton County, New York
Year	Republican / Whig		Democratic		Third party(ies)	
Year	No.	%	No.	%	No.	%
1840	1,964	53.99%	1,645	45.22%	29	0.80%
1844	2,107	47.90%	2,192	49.83%	100	2.27%
1848	1,976	49.81%	380	9.58%	1,611	40.61%
1852	2,171	49.84%	2,070	47.52%	115	2.64%
1856	2,593	51.85%	1,374	27.47%	1,034	20.68%
1860	2,977	55.07%	2,429	44.93%	0	0.00%
1864	2,742	52.28%	2,503	47.72%	0	0.00%
1868	3,375	52.46%	3,058	47.54%	0	0.00%
1872	3,551	54.48%	2,927	44.91%	40	0.61%
1876	3,940	51.66%	3,662	48.01%	25	0.33%
1880	4,579	57.92%	3,327	42.08%	0	0.00%
1884	5,138	53.98%	4,091	42.98%	289	3.04%
1888	5,892	53.93%	4,634	42.42%	399	3.65%
1892	5,368	51.72%	4,293	41.37%	717	6.91%
1896	7,704	63.44%	3,849	31.70%	590	4.86%
1900	7,230	61.91%	3,678	31.49%	771	6.60%
1904	6,521	56.88%	3,884	33.88%	1,059	9.24%
1908	6,574	57.96%	3,508	30.93%	1,260	11.11%
1912	3,741	38.00%	2,550	25.90%	3,555	36.11%
1916	5,756	54.35%	4,085	38.57%	750	7.08%
1920	10,946	70.44%	3,192	20.54%	1,401	9.02%
1924	11,858	72.49%	3,143	19.21%	1,357	8.30%
1928	15,043	71.16%	5,728	27.10%	368	1.74%
1932	14,984	71.39%	5,678	27.05%	326	1.55%
1936	14,253	60.05%	8,977	37.82%	507	2.14%
1940	14,896	62.03%	9,040	37.64%	79	0.33%
1944	13,195	59.79%	8,813	39.93%	62	0.28%
1948	12,787	60.50%	7,667	36.28%	680	3.22%
1952	18,068	70.31%	7,570	29.46%	58	0.23%
1956	18,244	74.17%	6,352	25.83%	0	0.00%
1960	14,455	58.09%	10,409	41.83%	19	0.08%
1964	7,278	31.44%	15,846	68.46%	23	0.10%
1968	11,895	54.52%	8,871	40.66%	1,052	4.82%
1972	15,200	67.33%	7,303	32.35%	72	0.32%
1976	12,161	56.23%	9,323	43.10%	145	0.67%
1980	11,448	53.19%	8,105	37.66%	1,969	9.15%
1984	14,887	65.82%	7,644	33.80%	87	0.38%
1988	11,757	56.17%	9,012	43.06%	162	0.77%
1992	9,137	40.00%	8,400	36.77%	5,308	23.23%
1996	7,881	37.30%	9,779	46.28%	3,470	16.42%
2000	11,434	52.75%	9,314	42.97%	927	4.28%
2004	12,570	56.58%	9,202	41.42%	443	1.99%
2008	11,709	53.65%	9,695	44.42%	420	1.92%
2012	10,814	54.62%	8,607	43.47%	378	1.91%
2016	13,462	63.46%	6,496	30.62%	1,256	5.92%
2020	15,378	64.84%	7,931	33.44%	409	1.72%
2024	16,237	67.51%	7,666	31.87%	150	0.62%

Fulton County has historically been a stronghold for the Republican Party, with the Republican presidential nominee winning the county in all but two presidential elections since the party's founding in 1854. Fulton County was won by Donald Trump in 2016 with 63.46 percent of the vote, which Trump then improved upon in 2020 with 64.84 percent.

A Democratic presidential nominee has only won twice in Fulton County since the Republican Party was founded, Lyndon B. Johnson in 1964 and Bill Clinton in 1996.

== Education ==
In 2019 the U.S. Census Bureau determined 87.4% of Fulton County's population obtained a high school degree or higher. Nearly 18% had a bachelor's degree or higher. Fulton–Montgomery Community College is in Johnstown, New York. It is a part of the State University of New York system.

School districts include:

- Amsterdam City School District
- Broadalbin-Perth Central School District
- Dolgeville Central School District
- Edinburg Common School District
- Fonda-Fultonville Central School District
- Fort Plain Central School District
- Galway Central School District
- Gloversville City School District
- Johnstown City School District
- Mayfield Central School District
- Northville Central School District
- Oppenheim-Ephratah-St. Johnsville Central School District
- Wheelerville Union Free School District

== See also ==
- List of counties in New York
- List of New York State Historic Markers in Fulton County, New York
- National Register of Historic Places listings in Fulton County, New York
