= Kawasaki LRV =

American light rail vehicle series

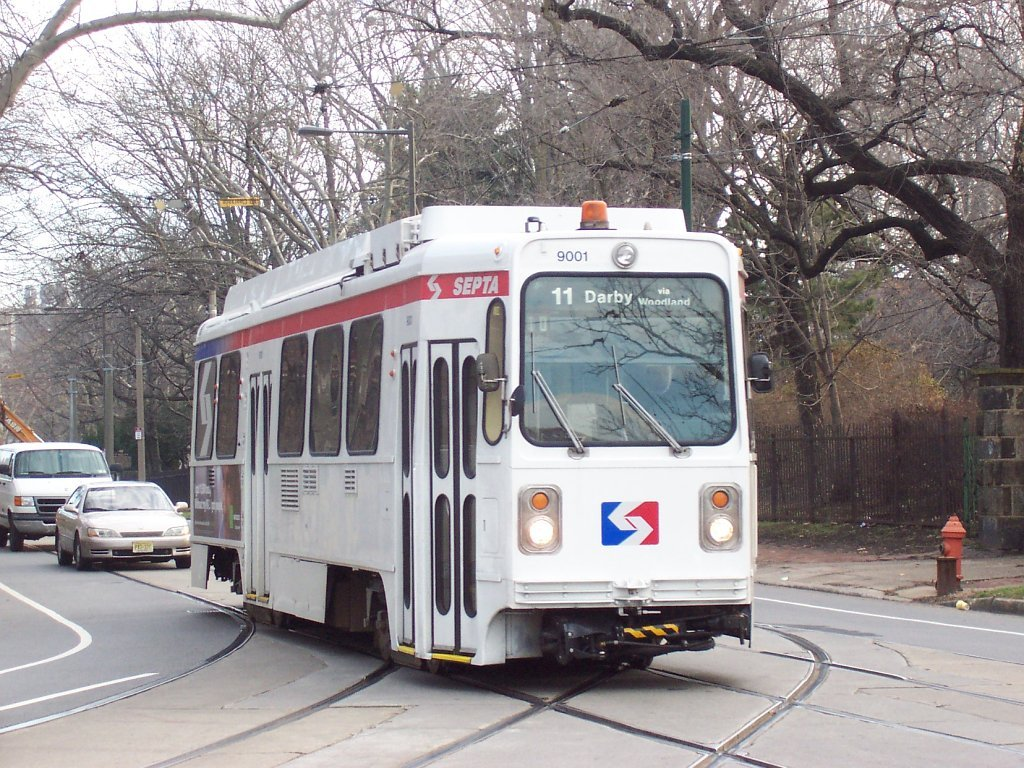
- SEPTA 9001, a Series 9000 car, 2006

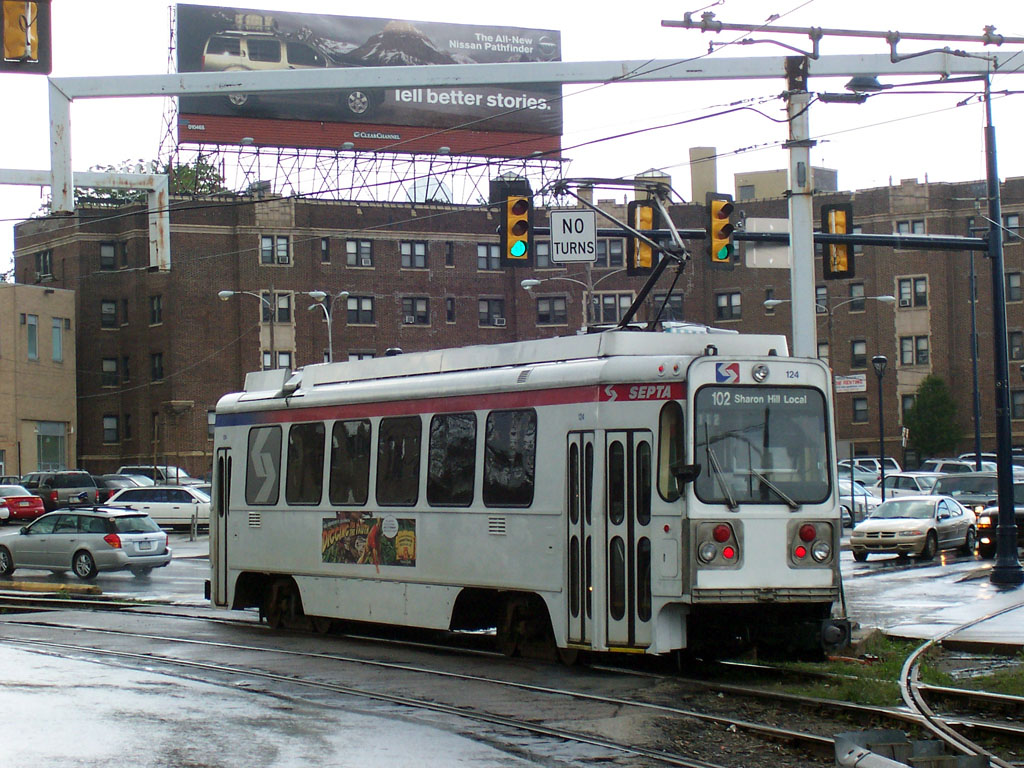
- SEPTA 124, a Series 100 car, 2007
- In service: November 1980–present
- Manufacturer: Kawasaki Heavy Industries
- Replaced: PCC streetcars, Brilliner
- Constructed: 1980–1981
- Number built: Series 9000: 112 cars; Series 100: 29 cars
- Successor: Alstom Citadis
- Formation: Series 9000: uni-directional vehicle; Series 100: bi-directional vehicle
- Fleet numbers: Series 9000: 9000-9111; Series 100: 100-128
- Capacity: Series 9000: 77 people (51 seated); Series 100: 67 people (50 seated)
- Operator: SEPTA
- Lines served: Series 9000: T; Series 100: D

Specifications
- Car length: Series 9000: 50 feet (15 m); Series 100: 53 feet (16 m)
- Width: Series 9000: 8 feet 6 inches (2.59 m); Series 100: 8 feet 10 inches (2.69 m)
- Height: 11 feet 10 inches (3.61 m)
- Floor height: 3 feet (910 mm)
- Maximum speed: Series 9000: 50 mph (80 km/h); Series 100: 62 mph (100 km/h)
- Weight: Series 9000: 26 tonnes (26 long tons; 29 short tons); Series 100: 27 tonnes (27 long tons; 30 short tons)
- Acceleration: 3.0 mph/s (4.8 km/(h⋅s))
- Deceleration: Series 9000: 4.0 mph/s (6.4 km/(h⋅s)); Series 100: 3.5 mph/s (5.6 km/(h⋅s))
- Electric systems: Overhead line, 600 V DC
- Current collection: Trolley pole (Series 9000); Pantograph (Series 100)
- UIC classification: Bo′Bo′
- AAR wheel arrangement: B-B
- Track gauge: 5 ft 2 1/2 in (1,588 mm)

Notes/references
- Sources

The Kawasaki Light Rail Vehicle (Kawasaki LRV), commonly referred to as the K-car, is a light rail vehicle manufactured by Kawasaki Heavy Industries and used for service on trolley lines operated by SEPTA. The Series 9000 is a streetcar that has been used on the SEPTA subway–surface trolley lines since 1980. The similar Series 100, which was manufactured at the same time, was also built for the Media–Sharon Hill Line. The K-cars were Kawasaki's first rail cars for the American market.

== Background ==
Since the days of privately owned streetcars before the establishment of the publicly owned SEPTA, high-performance PCC streetcars built by J. G. Brill Company were used on Philadelphia's streetcars. A similar vehicle manufactured by the same company, the Brilliner, was also active. In 1975, a decade after SEPTA was established, 60 PCC cars were destroyed by a fire at the Woodland Carbarn. SEPTA soon leased streetcars from the Toronto streetcar system. However, since the 1970s, the aging streetcars began to break down, and SEPTA sought to replace them with modern streetcars. The US Standard Light Rail Vehicle (USSLRV) was considered for possible use on SEPTA, but it was rejected due to the many mechanical difficulties experienced by USSLRVs used on the Boston MBTA's Green Line and on Muni Metro in San Francisco as well as funding not being in place to acquire them if considered. In 1980, the first Series 9000 car, SEPTA 9000, was built by Kawasaki Heavy Industries according to SEPTA specifications.

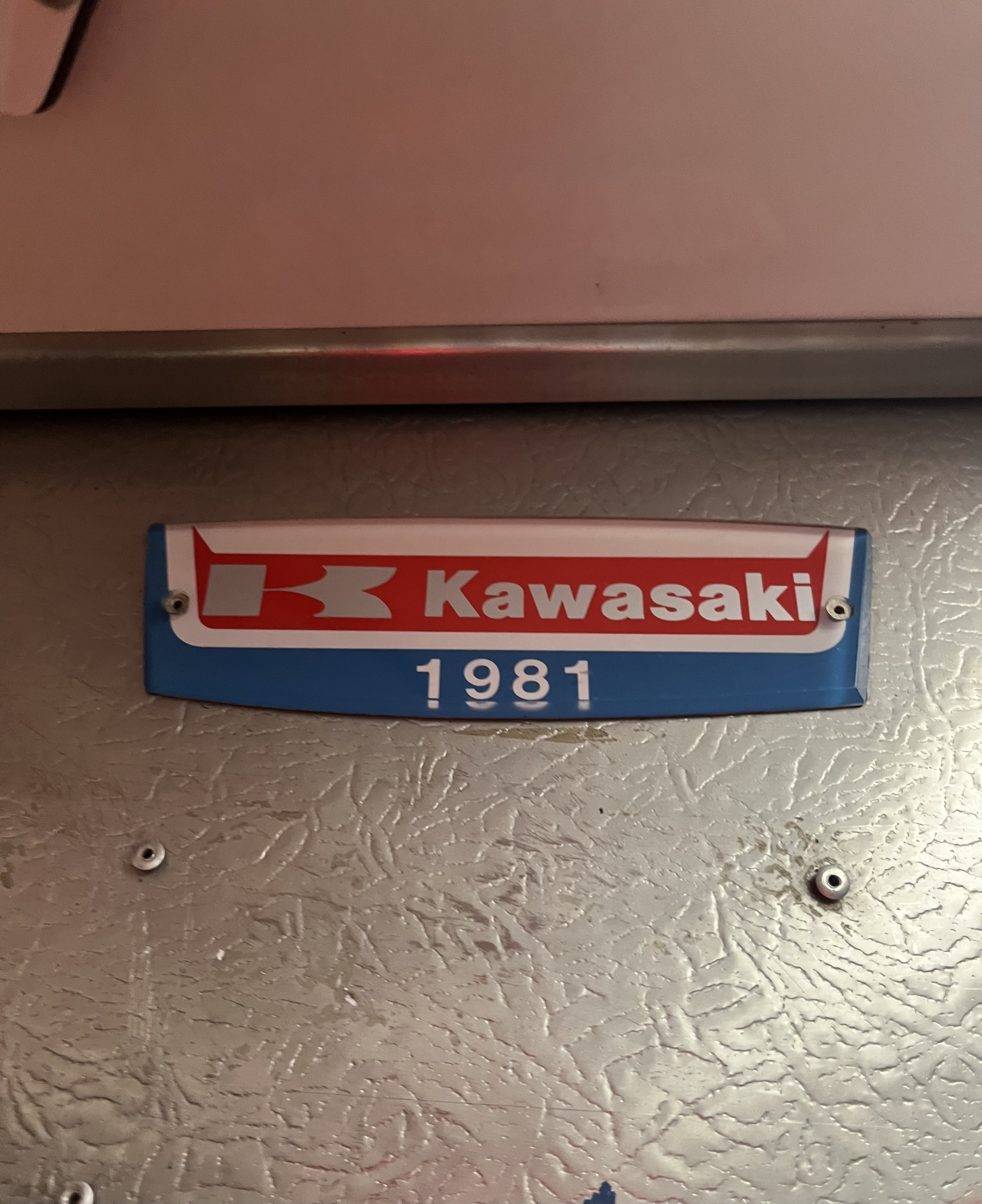
Builders plate of the Kawasaki LRVs

== Overview ==
=== Structure ===
The Series 9000 for the subway-surface trolleys and the Series 100 for the suburban system have differences in body structure, bogies, current collectors, etc. However, both types can be operated with one car, though multiple-unit train control is also possible. The design was based on a request from SEPTA, and although the interior layout and driving equipment were based on the PCCs and Brilliners, several new technologies were introduced.

=== Body ===
The car body is made of weathering steel, and the underframe other than the pillow frame and the area near the passenger door are stainless steel to prevent corrosion because snow-melting agent is sprayed in winter. The width of the car is wider than conventional cars, sitting at 8.5 feet (2.6 m) for Series 9000 cars and 8.83 feet (2.69 m) for Series 100 cars. The ends of each car are narrowed toward the front to accommodate route conditions with many sharp curves. In the design phase, the finite element method was used to reduce weight, improve safety, and increase ease of maintenance.

=== Interior ===
The interior is designed by Yashiro Composites of Japan, and the seats of the Series 9000 are made of fiber-reinforced plastic, while the Series 100 has upholstered seats using rubber cushions. High-density glass wool is used for the floor, sides, and ceiling, and polycarbonate sheets with a thickness of 0.5 inches (13 mm) are used for the window glass to improve soundproofing and heat insulation inside the car. The inside of the car is fully equipped with air conditioning for both heating and cooling, but until 2003 when fully sealed windows were installed, only the upper part of the window glass could be opened inward.

Because they were manufactured before the enactment of the Americans with Disabilities Act of 1990, no consideration had been given for wheelchair users, and the cars are therefore inaccessible. The cars have a high floor height of 3 feet (910 mm), requiring steps to get on and off platforms (Note: The first SEPTA streetcars to be equipped with barrier-free facilities in compliance with the Americans with Disabilities Act were the "SEPTA PCC II" cars, which were modified between 2002 and 2004.), with doorways that are too narrow to accommodate wheelchairs and cannot be widened without substantial frame modifications. The boarding doors use pneumatic inward double swing doors (called "blinker style"), and they are equipped with a re-opening and closing function that automatically opens when a foreign object is caught.

The speed control in the driver's cab is the same as that of the PCC cars. 3 pedals that play the role of acceleration, braking, and a dead man's switch are installed under the console at the foot of the driver's cab. In addition to the speedometer and air compression meter, the cab is equipped with various toggle switches and indicator lights indicating the status of the equipment.

=== Equipment ===
The bogie uses a hollow shaft, with chevron rubber for the axle spring and an air spring for the pillow spring is used, of which the pressure on the air spring is detected by the load-bearing device. The bogie frame has a structure that is easy to twist so that the wheels can follow and run stably even on a track in poor condition. The wheels vary depending on the type: the Series 9000 cars have the same elastic wheels as the PCC car, while the Series 100 cars have integrally rolled wheels for high-speed operation. In addition to installing two electric motors in both types, disc brakes and electromagnetic brakes (emergency) are equipped as braking devices.

The electric motor is a direct current motor (61 kw, 300 V, 230 A, 2,000 rpm) and is controlled by a two-phase double armature chopper control scheme. When driving, the alternating current is generated by the pedal angle, and the main circuit is continuously and smoothly controlled using a microprocessor. In addition to regenerative braking, electric braking can also be used in case of unusability. In addition, an alternator (AC230 V, 3-phase 40 kVA) is also installed as an auxiliary power supply, and the current through the low-voltage power supply is used to charge lighting and storage batteries, lighting, and information broadcasting.

On the roof, in addition to the current collector and various resistors, an air conditioning unit that keeps the temperature inside the car between 65 °F (18 °C) and 76 °F (24 °C) is installed. In the summer, cold air is sent to the car through the ceiling duct, while in the winter, the heater of the air conditioning unit and the heater with a floor-type fan are heated. The heat generated from the floor heater is also used for snow melting in the boarding and alighting steps.

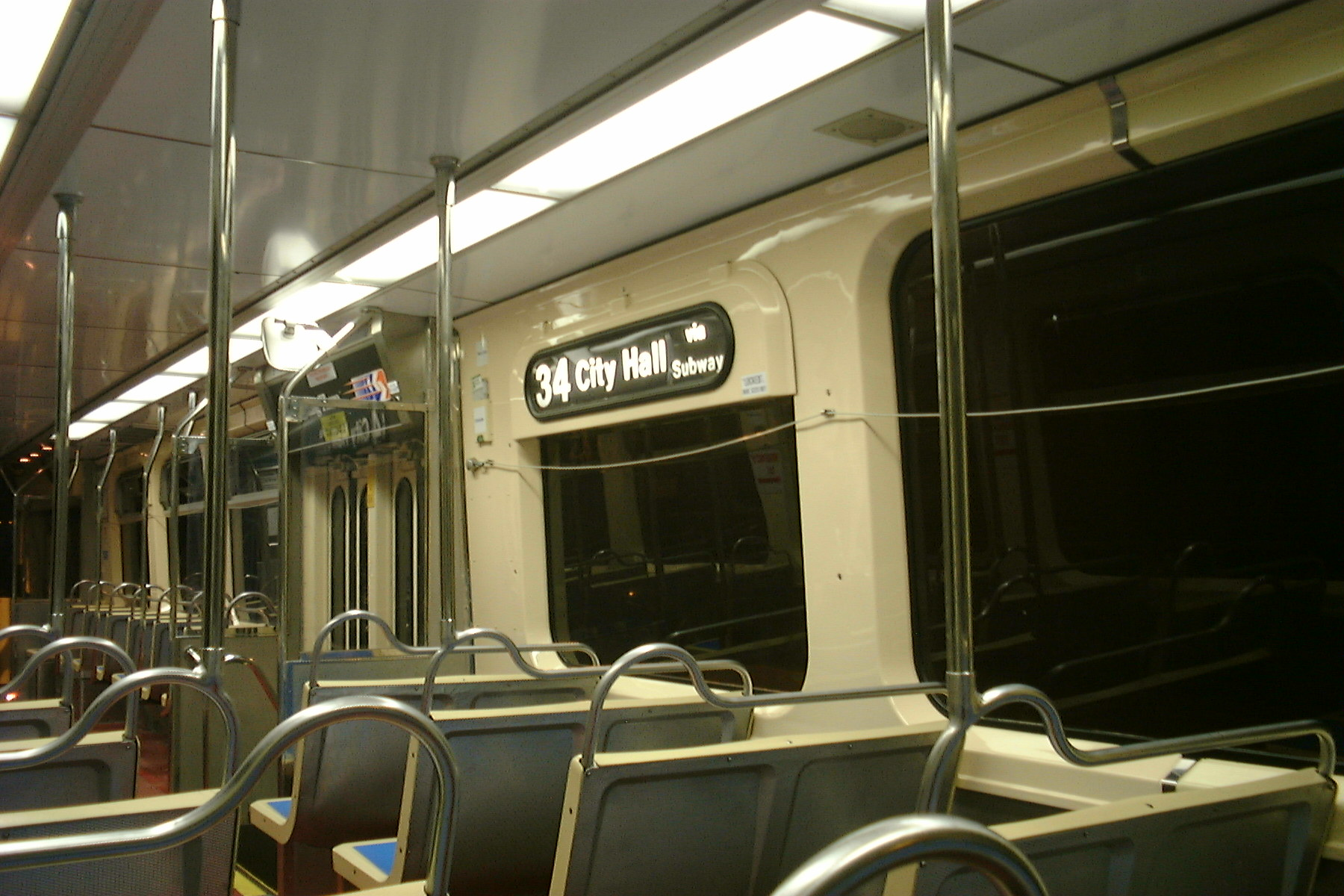
Interior of a Series 9000 car

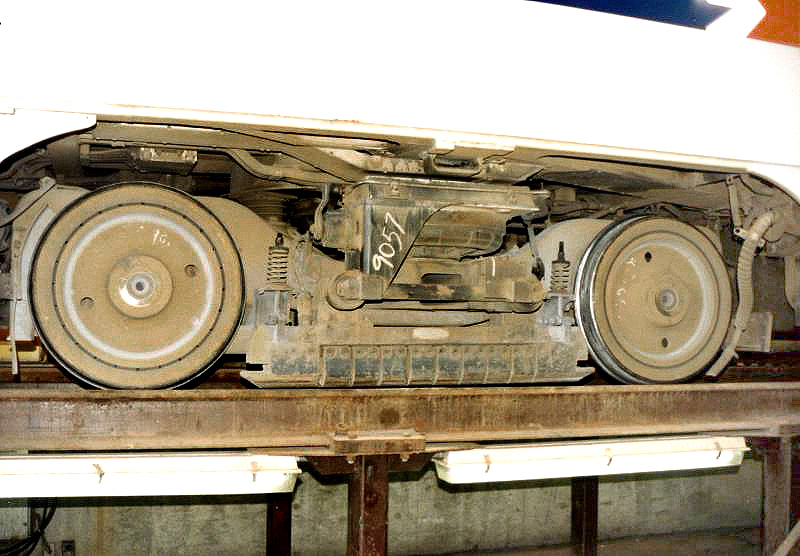
Bogie of a Series 9000 car

=== Differences between Series 9000 and Series 100 ===
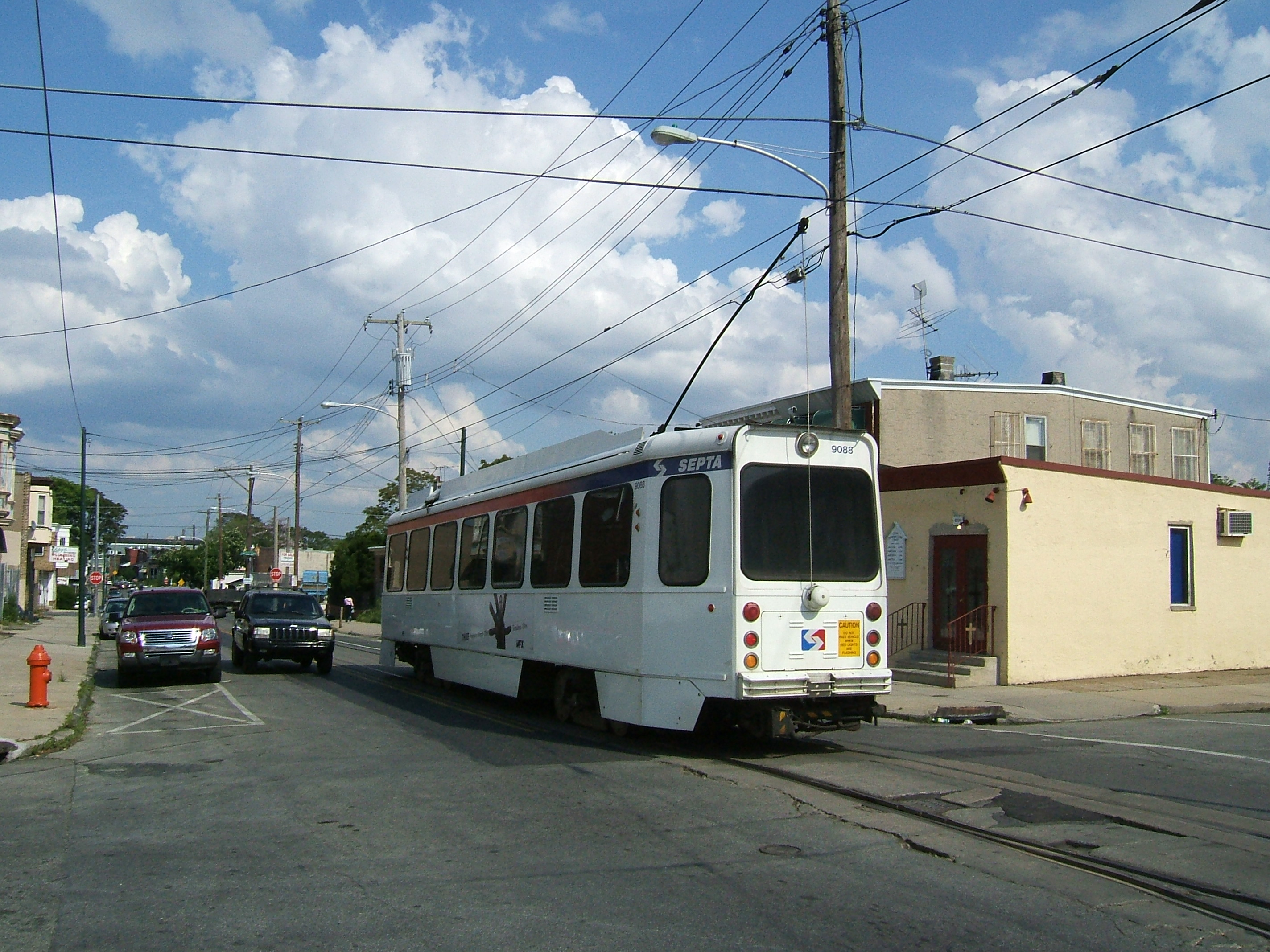
There is no cab at the rear of the Series 9000

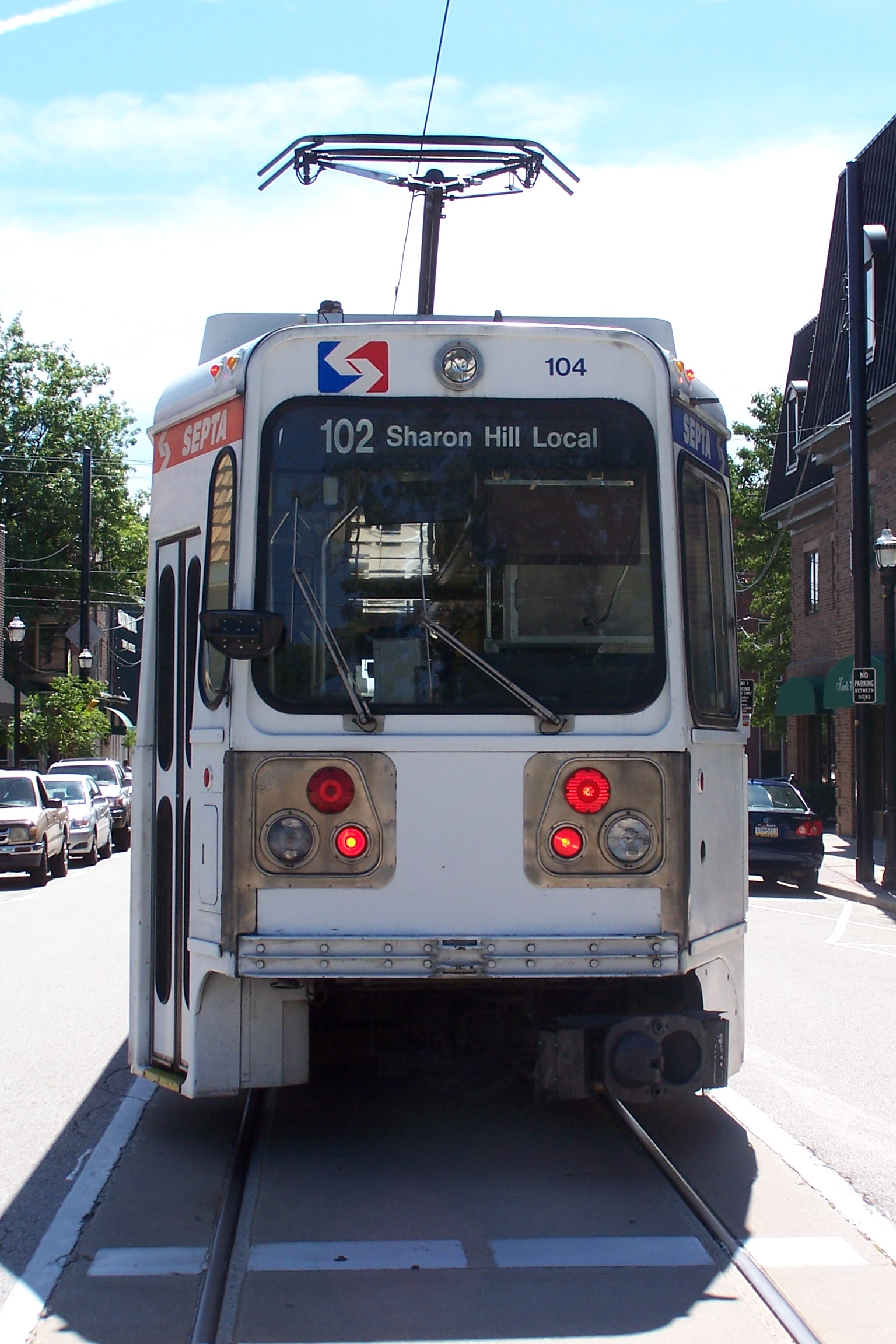
Front of a Series 100 car

The Series 9000 for the city system and the Series 100 for the suburban system have the following differences in the body and bogie in addition to dimensions, maximum speed, and weight.

	Series 9000	Series 100
Driver's cab	Uni-directional	Bi-directional
Number of doors	2 doors on the right side (front and middle)	2 doors on each sides (front and rear)
Current collector	Trolley pole	Pantograph
Seating arrangement	Cross	Cross-seating, long seat near the boarding door
Coupling	Automatic coupler (with electro-pneumatic coupler)	Automatic coupler (with emergency buffer device and electro-pneumatic coupler)
Rear lights	2 lights	4 lights

== Operation ==
The prototype was completed in 1980, and entered service that June. However, the drawings on the SEPTA structure gauge and signaling system, which were used as a reference during the design, were outdated. As a result, the trolleys touched the platforms, and there were signal problems. To resolve this, SEPTA made several infrastructure modifications to accommodate the new cars. By 1981, 141 cars (112 Series 9000 cars and 29 Series 100 cars) had been delivered, including prototypes, and all of them were put into commercial operation in 1982. The final assembly of the vehicle was done by Boeing, which was working on the USSLRV. These achievements laid the groundwork for Kawasaki's entry into the US railcar market in the years that followed.

As of 2018, the 112 Series 9000 cars (numbered 9000-9111) run on the SEPTA subway–surface trolley lines, while the 29 Series 100 cars are used on the Media–Sharon Hill Line.

With the introduction of the K-cars, all Brilliner cars and most of the PCC cars owned by SEPTA were retired, scrapped, preserved, or transferred to other cities. The remaining PCC cars owned by SEPTA were modified into the SEPTA PCC II series, which are now used on SEPTA Route 15.

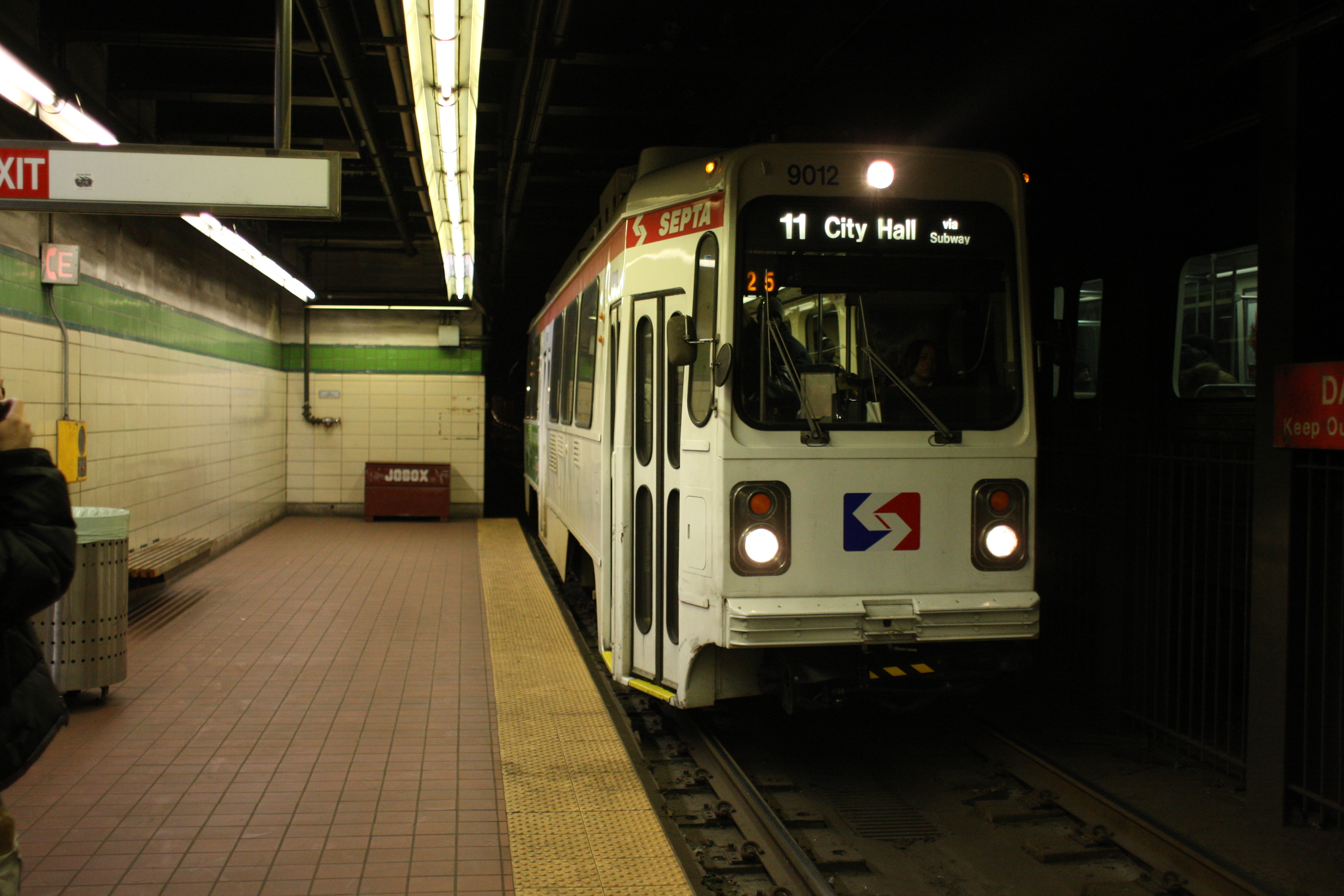
Series 9000 entering the underground section of the subway–surface lines (2007)

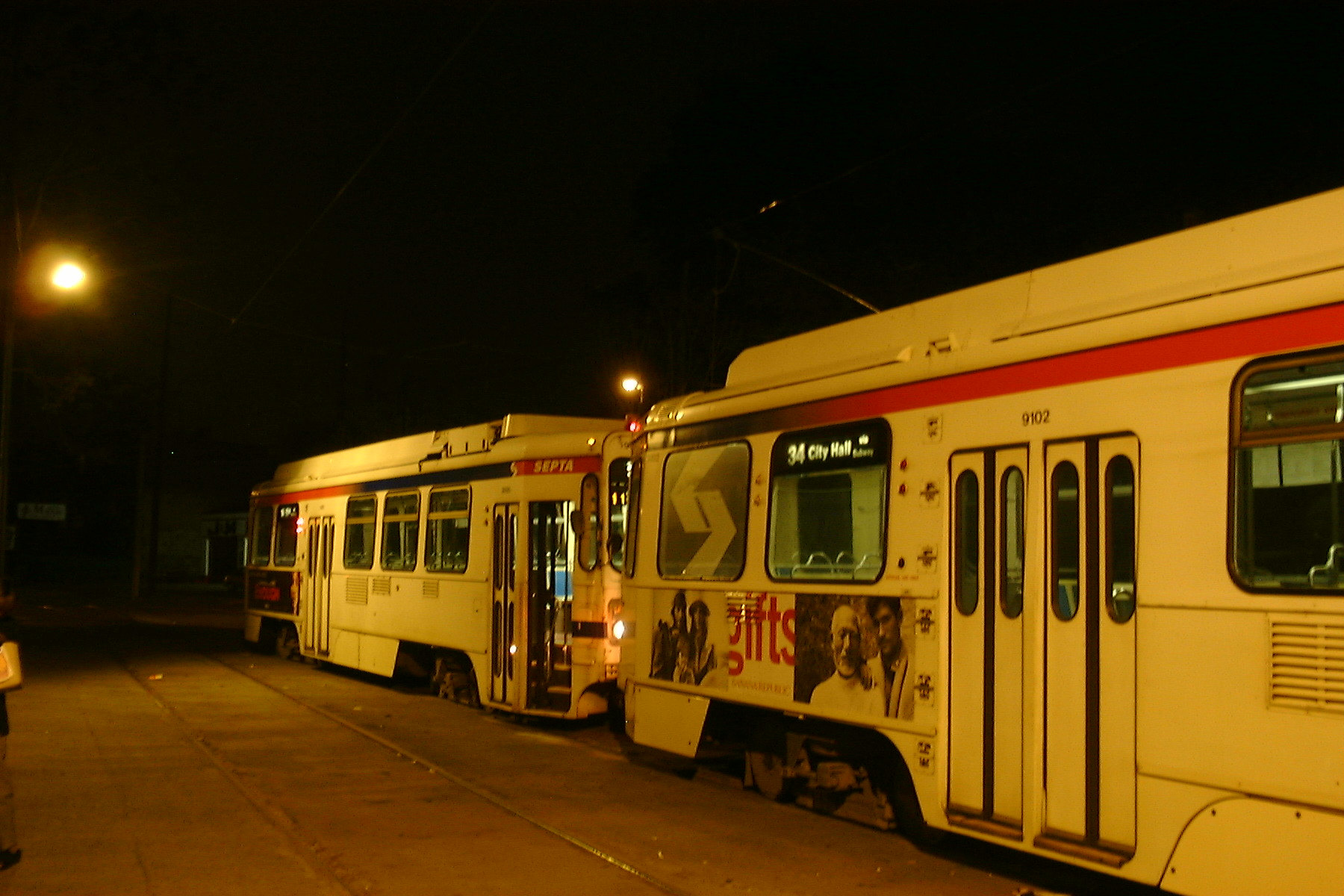
Two Series 9000, coupled together (2002)

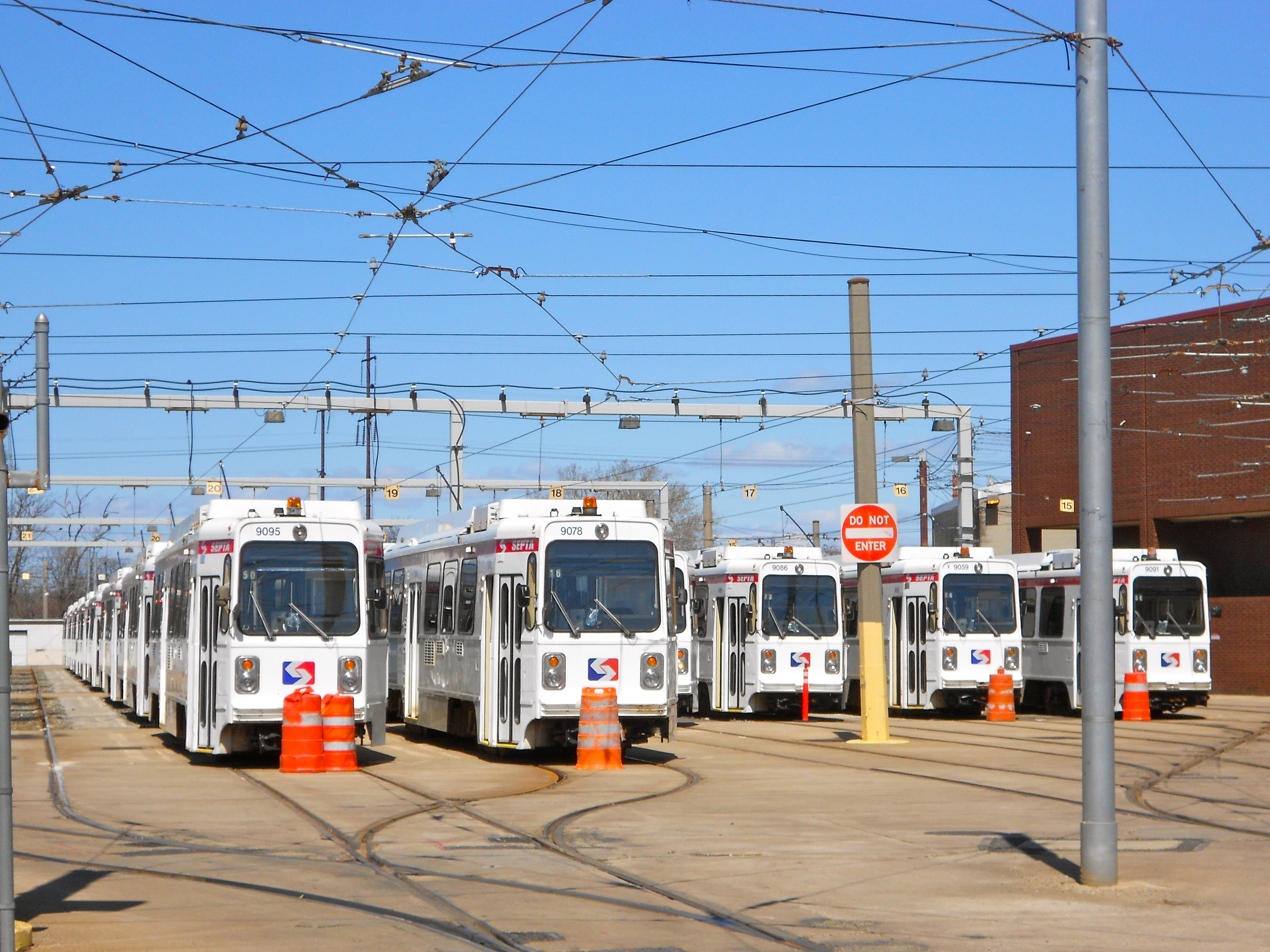
Series 9000 cars in Elmwood Depot (2015)

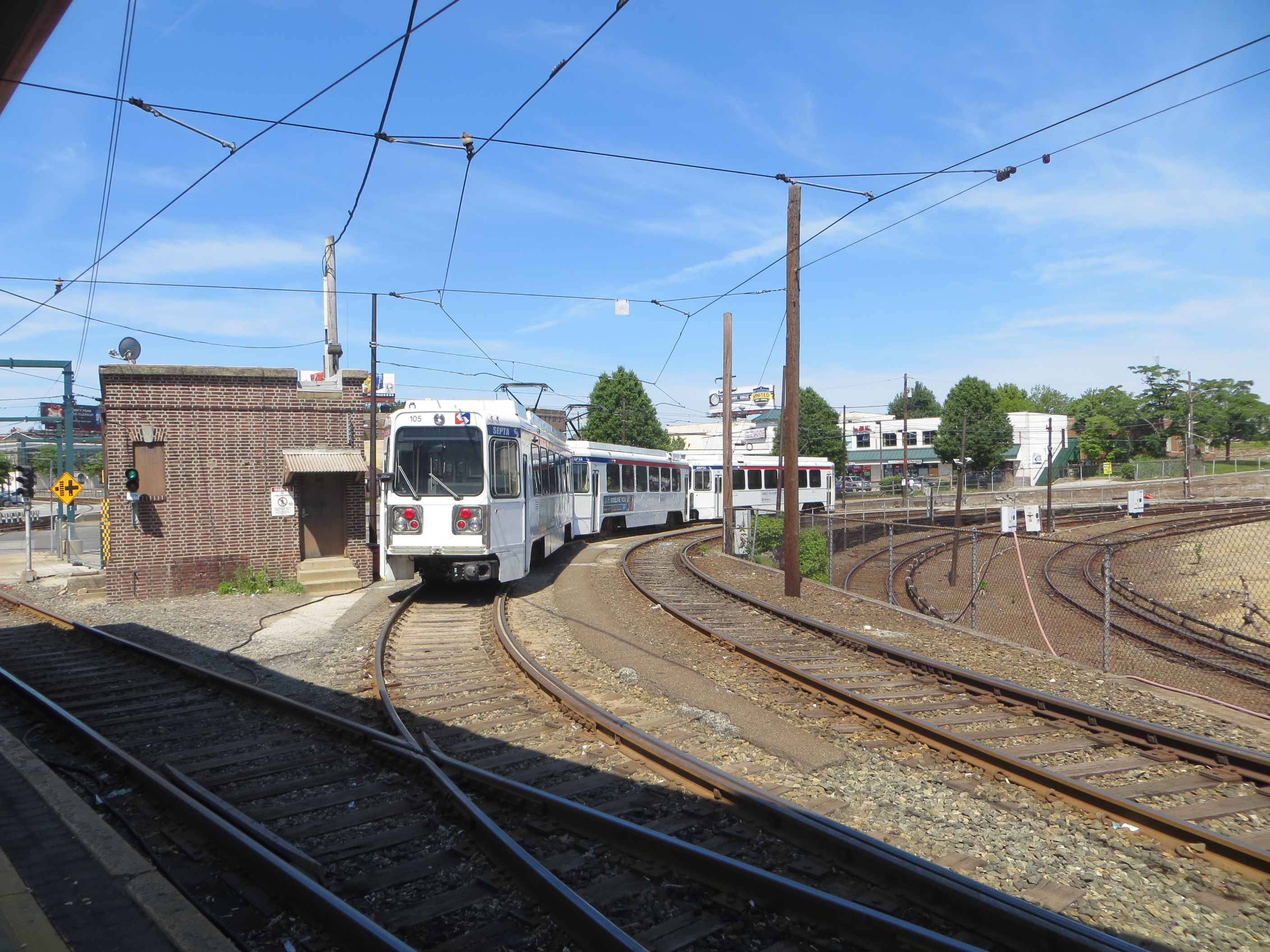
A three-car train of Series 100 cars (2014)

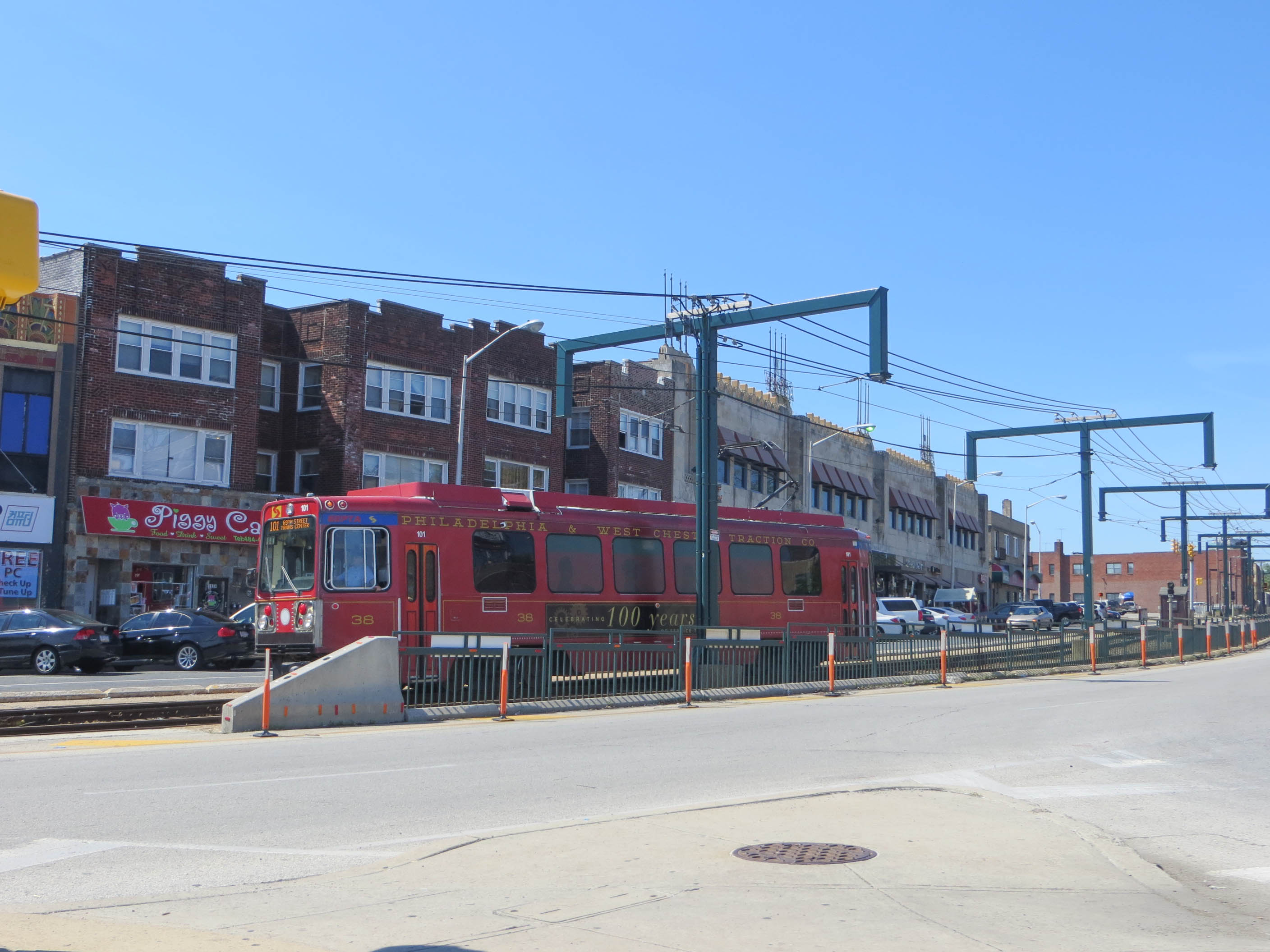
A Series 100 car wrapped to commemorate the Philadelphia and West Chester Traction Company (2014)

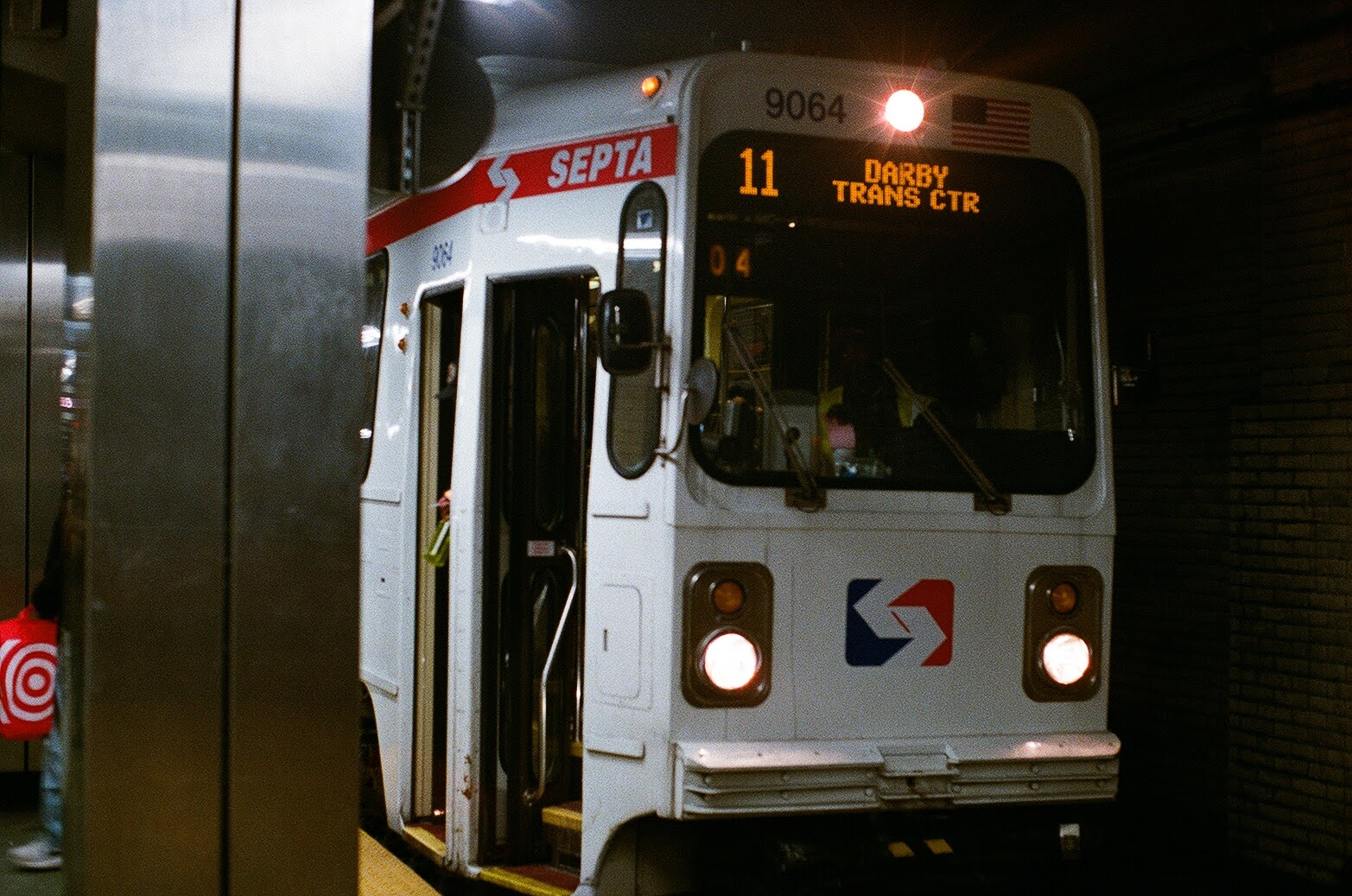
A SEPTA 11/T4 trolley arrives at 15th St Station

== Heritage unit ==
In March 2024, the first K-car, SEPTA 9000, was repainted in a special heritage livery, recreating the livery that it used when it was first built. Shortly after, sister car 9100 was repainted into the same scheme, and suburban car 106 was repainted into the suburban version of the same scheme with a slight variation on the end stripes.

== Future ==
With the K-cars being over 40 years old, SEPTA is working on modernizing its trolley network. In 2023, SEPTA awarded Alstom a $714.2 million contract to furnish 130 new low-floor trolleys, with an option for 30 more. The trolleys will be of Alstom's Citadis family and will be 80 feet in length and fully ADA-compliant, which the current K-cars are not. The first trolley is expected to be delivered from Alstom in the Spring of 2027, with the last trolley to be delivered some time in 2030.

== See also ==
- B (SEPTA Metro), another SEPTA line using Kawasaki rolling stock
