= John Brill =

John Brill may refer to:

- John Brill (photographer) (born 1951), American photographer
- John Frederick Brill (1919–1942), English soldier and painter
- John George Brill (1817–1888), manufacturer of streetcars and interurban cars in the United States
