= Fonda, Johnstown and Gloversville Railroad =

Railway line in the United States of America

Fonda, Johnstown & Gloversville

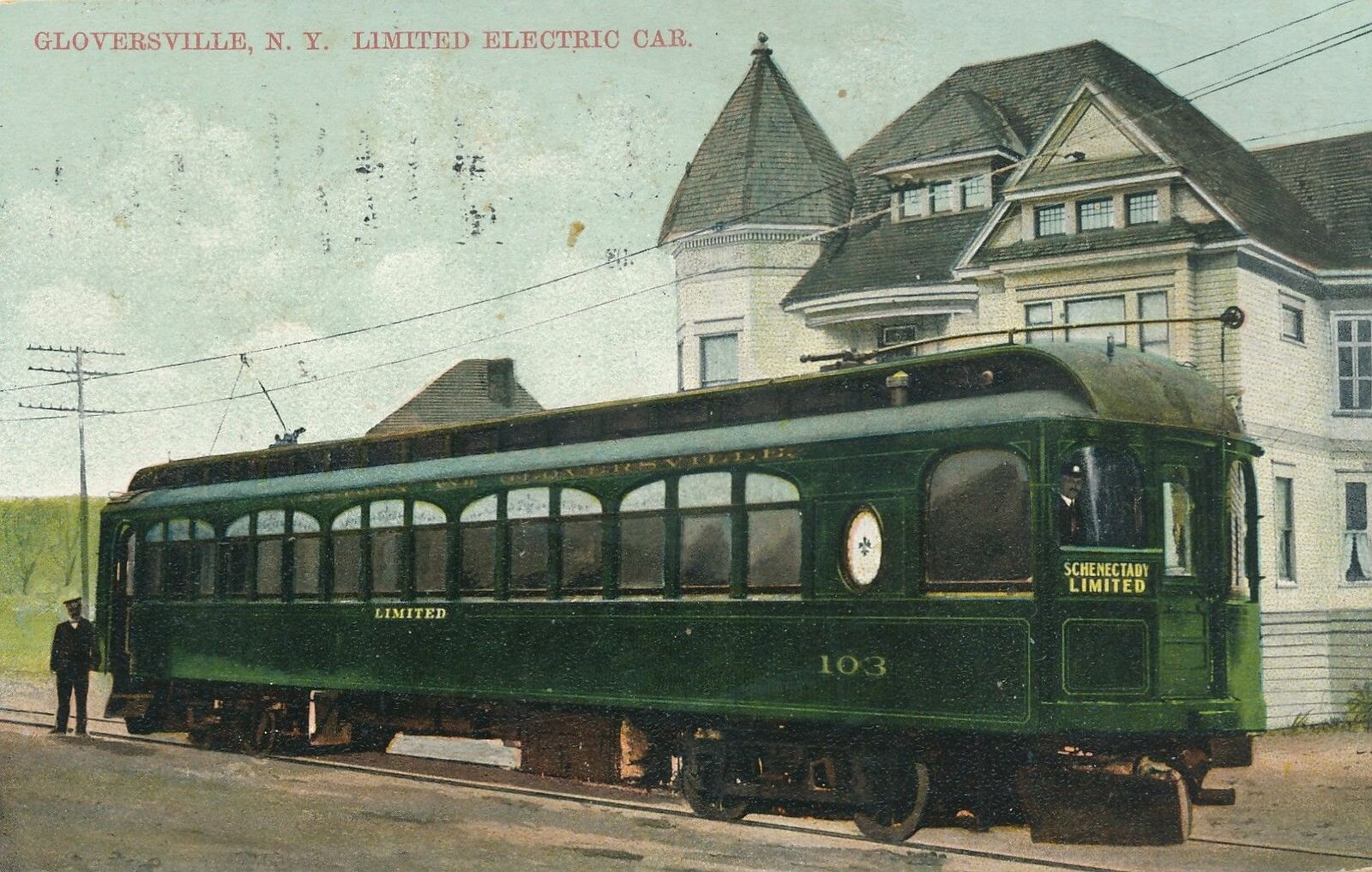
- A 1909 postcard of a Schenectady Limited interurban car

Overview
- Headquarters: Gloversville, New York
- Reporting mark: FJG
- Locale: Fulton County, Upstate New York
- Dates of operation: 1867–1984

Technical
- Track gauge: 4 ft 8+1/2 in (standard gauge)
- Electrification: 600v DC

Other
- Website: http://www.fjgrr.org

The Fonda, Johnstown and Gloversville Railroad (FJ&G) was formerly a 132-mile (212 km) interurban railroad that connected its namesake towns in east central New York State to Schenectady, New York. From the 1870s to the early 1980s, the FJ&G held a successful and profitable transportation business, hauling workers, salesmen, and executives of the very large number of glove manufacturing companies in the area to the New York Central (NYC) station at Schenectady. From there, they would board trains to travel south to New York City or west to Chicago, Illinois.

They also provided freight services and interchanged with the NYC and the Delaware and Hudson railroads. Passenger ridership declined before and during Great Depression. Following a determined and expensive effort to recapture passenger business by acquiring five ultra modern high-speed Brill Bullet interurban cars in 1932, the FJ&G abandoned passenger service in 1938. Freight business continued on for a few more decades. In their final years, the FJ&G was controlled by the Delaware Otsego Corporation (DO), but following a loss of a major customer, the railroad was shut down and abandoned in 1984.

== History ==
=== Formation and operations ===
The FJ&G was incorporated in 1867, and their first train operated from Fonda to Gloversville, in 1870. Gloversville, named after several glove companies in the area (237 in 1905), was at the northern end of the FJ&G for a few years before the railroad extended northward by business owners. In the later 19th century, the FJ&G extended to Broadalbin via Broadalbin Junction, where trains would travel east to Vail Mills and Broadalbin, and they acquired the Gloversville and Broadalbin (G&B) and Gloversville and Northville (G&N) railroads. The G&N traveled from northern Gloversville through Mayfield and Cranberry Creek to Northville, which became the FJ&G's permanent terminus.

The FJ&G railroad itself was acquired by the Cayadutta Electric Railroad, and they retained the FJ&G name. The Cayadutta line, which lied across the Sacandaga River from Northville to the village of Sacandaga Park, hauled tourists and vacationers to resort destinations, including hotels, camp sites, beaches, and numerous amusement park rides, including a miniature train ride. Numerous FJ&G passengers were unloaded at Northville and continued on by horsedrawn hack or stage to Adirondack destinations to the north, including Wells, Lake Pleasant and Piseco. It was nicknamed the "Gateway to the Adirondacks."

=== Passenger service decline and abandonment ===
After World War I, ridership began to decline in both the FJ&G's steam and electric divisions. In the early 1920s, the steam-powered line acquired gas-powered motor cars to carry patrons to the Sacandaga Park.

By 1930, the state of New York completed construction of a dam in the Sacandaga River at Conklingville, to improve water flows, creating the Great Sacandaga Lake. The regulation was made to aid the water volume of the Hudson River to help ocean-going freight ships use the Port of Albany. This flooded a large area, displacing many residents and covering a number of FJ&G sections. Following the cutoff of the railroad's connection to Northville, and the booming popularity of automobiles, the majority of the FJ&G's passenger service was solely operated by trolleys on the interurban lines connecting with Fonda, Amsterdam and Schenectady.

By 1932, FJ&G management concluded that reequipping the passenger car fleet on the electric-powered line would reverse their losses, in spite of the ongoing Great Depression. They ordered five lightweight, fast, comfortable, and power-efficient Brill Bullet cars from J. G. Brill and Company of Philadelphia. The first sale of the Bullet cars by Brill had been to the Philadelphia and Western Railroad, and the second and final sale was to the FJ&G. The arrival of the Bullet cars initially increased passenger ridership, but it subsequently declined, due to increasing automobile sales, paved road improvements, and the worsening effects of the Depression.

Glove and fine leather-manufacturing firms in Gloversville and Johnstown were affected by the ongoing Depression, and in turn, it affected the FJ&G's operations. The FJ&G's Mohawk River bridge, a major connection to Schenectady, had been damaged ten years earlier by river icebergs, and in 1935, it was condemned by the state of New York. The FJ&G's interurban cars consequently had to begin operating in reverse out of Crescent Park, without any turn-around methods.

In 1938, the FJ&G decided to shut down and abandon their entire electric trolley service. The Bullet cars were later sold to the Bamberger Railroad interurban in Utah. One of the Bullet cars was eventually moved to the Orange Empire Railway Museum in Perris, California. What had once been a 45-minute trolley ride from Schenectady to Gloversville now took 90 minutes or longer by motorbus. As late as the 1950s, FJ&G still operated a daily passenger run to the village of Broadalbin to maintain their charter, using a single wood-clad 1880s vintage coach—commonly carrying as little as two passengers—coupled to a diesel switcher.

=== Decline and closure ===
Following the abandonment of their passenger operations, the FJ&G solely prioritized their freight operations. By January 1974, following declining traffic from disappearing local industries, the FJ&G shut down their operations. That same year, the FJ&G was purchased by the Delaware Otsego Corporation (DO), and the railroad quickly turned profits under their ownership. In the early 1980s, Gloversville and Johnstown-based leather firms abandoned the railroad to begin relying on truck-shipping, and the FJ&G's final remaining major customer, Coleco, closed their toy-manufacturing facility to concentrate on computers.

The FJ&G's freight traffic consequently declined to the point they were losing money, and in 1984, DO embargoed the railroad. DO negotiated with local politicians and business people to sell the FJ&G to continue their operations under new ownership, but to no avail. In 1988, a trackmobile formed one last train on the dormant FJ&G by collecting any rolling stock that still idled on the line, and the tracks were removed two years later.

Some of the right-of-way was redeveloped as a recreational trail from just south of the city of Johnstown to Denny's Crossing near Broadalbin Junction. Another small portion near Vail Mills has also been converted into a trail, but the remainder of the original FJ&G track foundations remained unchanged for over two decades, due to lack of funding, land disputes, and a lack of interest. A small portion of the roadbed south of Johnstown was redeveloped for a Walmart Distribution Center, and the former right-of-way in Vail Mills near routes 30 and 29 is soon to be altered with the intersection being converted to a traffic circle.

If the rails to trails is to continue, the FJ&G will need to be paved from Denny's Crossing toward Vail Mills to form a connection in that area and onward into Broadalbin. On the southern portion, the original right of way will need to be altered to go around the industrial park to continue south toward Fonda.
