= Bullet (interurban) =

Philadelphia electric multiple-unit passenger car

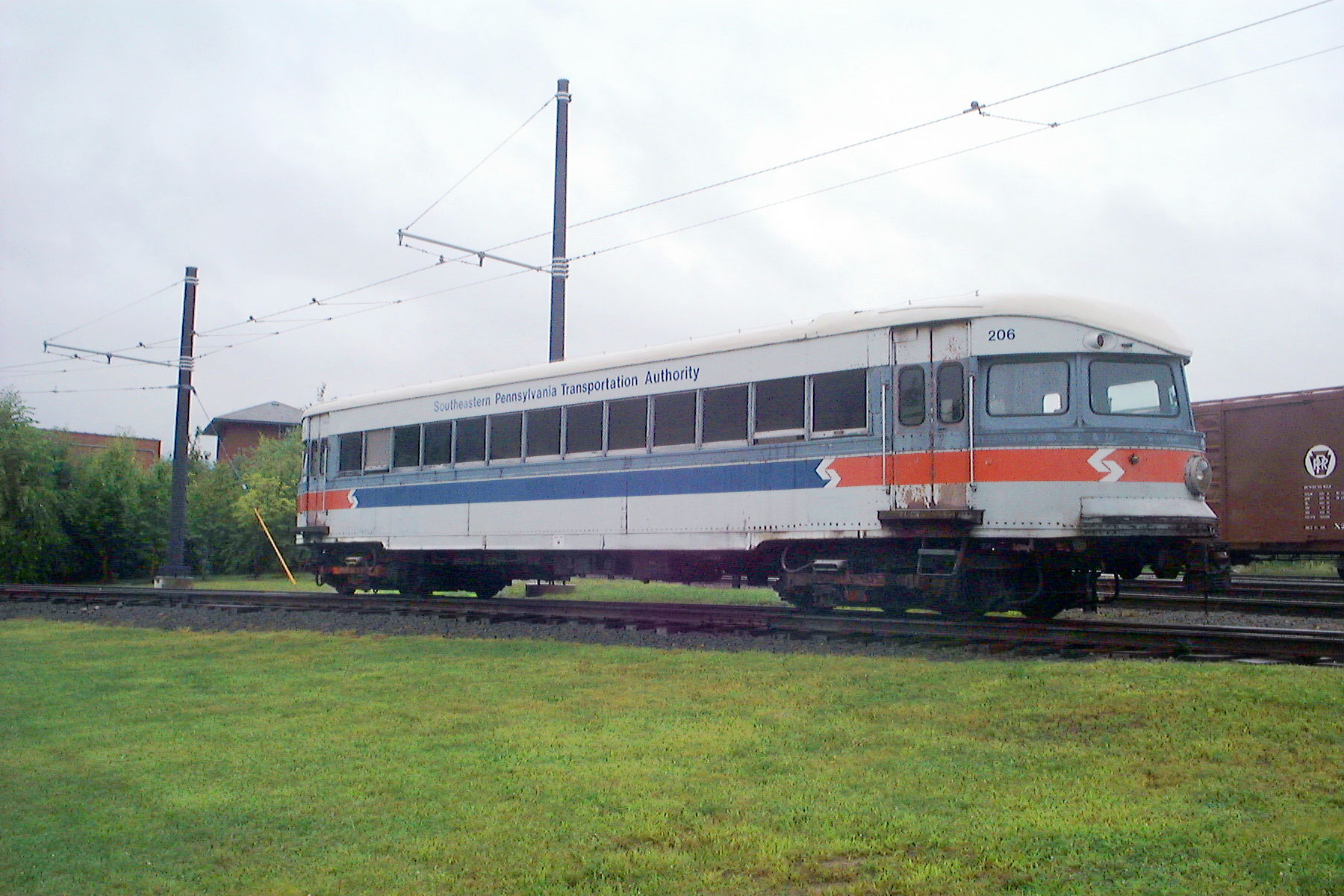
- P&W #206 on display at Electric City Trolley Museum in Scranton, Pennsylvania
- In service: 1931–1990
- Manufacturer: J. G. Brill Company
- Constructed: 1931
- Scrapped: 1990s
- Number built: 11
- Number preserved: 6
- Number scrapped: 5 (203 due to electrical fire but replaced)
- Operators: P&W; SEPTA

Specifications
- Car length: 55 feet (16.76 m)
- Maximum speed: 92 mph (148 km/h)
- Weight: 26 short tons (23 long tons; 24 t)
- Traction motors: 4 × 100 horsepower (75 kW)
- Electric system(s): Third rail, 600 V DC
- Current collector(s): Contact shoe
- UIC classification: Bo’Bo’
- AAR wheel arrangement: B-B
- Bogies: Brill 89-E
- Braking system(s): Straight-Air Self-Lapping air brakes
- Multiple working: Yes
- Track gauge: 4 ft 8 1/2 in (1,435 mm) standard gauge

Bullet
- In service: 1932–1953
- Manufacturer: J. G. Brill Company
- Constructed: 1932
- Number built: 5
- Capacity: 54
- Operators: FJ&G; Bamberger Railroad

Specifications
- Car length: 46 feet 11 inches (14.3 m)
- Maximum speed: 75 miles per hour (121 km/h)
- Weight: 21.1 short tons (18.8 long tons; 19.1 t)
- Bogies: Brill 89E
- Track gauge: 4 ft 8 1/2 in (1,435 mm) standard gauge

The Bullet was a streamlined electric multiple unit passenger car produced by the J. G. Brill Company in Philadelphia for the Philadelphia and Western Railroad (P&W) in 1931, and then similar, somewhat smaller single-unit, single-end versions were built for the Fonda, Johnstown and Gloversville Railroad in 1932. Few were sold because of the Great Depression and the public transport decline in the 1930s. However, some of the P&W cars ran for almost 60 years while later being under SEPTA.

== The first American railroad car in a wind tunnel ==
The Bullets were a result of a broad research program. This program was led by Philadelphia and Western's vice-chairman W. L. Butler, who had been largely responsible for development of the Cincinnati and Lake Erie Railroad's Red Devil car design, in collaboration with the J. G. Brill Company. Unlike the Red Devils, the Bullets had all-aluminum bodies. Their design was improved over earlier styles of railcars after a lot of wind tunnel research – the first in the American railway industry – the Bullet was streamlined to minimize the air resistance. According to Felix W. Pawlowski of University of Michigan, this would save 40% or more of the energy required by the conventional type of passenger car at speeds in excess of 60 mph (97 km/h). They also developed an improved low-level bogie (truck) design, and the Bullets could run as multiple-unit trains. Like the Red Devils, the Bullets had four 100-horsepower (75 kW) motors. The Bullets as built for the P&W were longer at 55 feet (17 m) and a bit heavier at 26 short tons (24 t), but with only about half the weight of typical railcars of that time.

The P&W cars operated exclusively off of third rail, while the FJ&G cars used 600 V overhead wire and trolley poles with trolley wheels.

== A forerunner of the high-speed trains ==
The Bullet was a forerunner of today's high-speed trains, of which the first were inaugurated later in the 1930s. Among other trains, the Japanese Odakyū 3000 series SE Romancecar was inspired by the sleek and streamlined Bullets. In 1957, the Romancecar set a speed record for narrow-gauge trains of 145 km/h (90,1 mph). The Bullets are called "ancestors of the TGV, Eurostar, AVE, ICE, Shinkansen, and the Acela Express" (in English, the first Shinkansens were named Bullet Trains) and they are also strikingly similar to Germany's Fliegender Hamburger. The Bullets' maximum speed was 92 miles per hour (148 km/h), though one reached 100 mph (160 km/h) while testing extended-wheelbase trucks.

=== No grade crossings ===
The P&W was originally conceived to be a Class I railroad which would compete for east-west traffic with the Pennsylvania Railroad. Already in 1907, the P&W had laid trackage with a quality unseen before by an interurban – free from grade crossings with both railroads and roads, and with a color-light block signal system, like most Class I railroads of the era. Nearly the entire line was double track to improve safety and capacity. To further utilize the Bullets' potential, more improvements were made to track and signal systems to permit extremely high speeds on the Norristown line.

In a test run one of the cars traveled the 13.5-mile (21.7 km) P&W line from Norristown to the 69th Street Terminal in Upper Darby in 11 minutes while in regular passenger service they cut express schedule timings by 1/3, from 24 to only 16 minutes including stops, running at 80–90 mph (130–140 km/h)

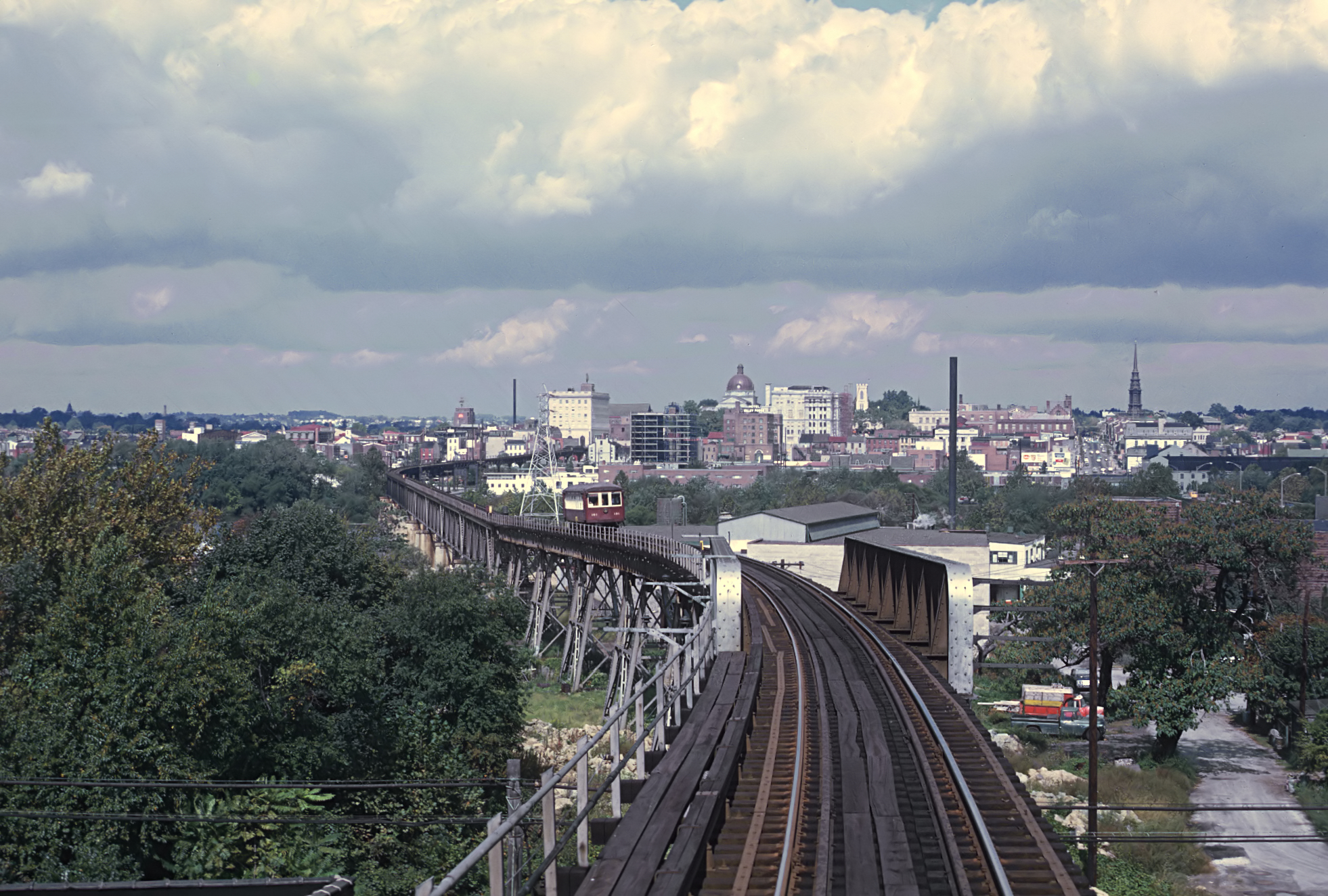
Philadelphia Suburban Transportation Co. Strafford Car on long trestle at Norristown, PA on September 28, 1969

P&W bought ten double ended, multiple-unit Bullets. Brill later built an eleventh replacement unit. Five shorter 47 feet (14 m), single ended, single-unit Bullets with a slightly different front and rear design were sold to Fonda, Johnstown and Gloversville Railroad (FJ&G) in 1932. P&W used a protected over-running third rail with high-level station platforms exclusively. FJ&G's Bullets were trolleys, as they had to be compatible with both street running as well as high-speed private right-of-way.

The decline of the interurban business as a result of the Great Depression of the 1930s and increasing use of automobiles and buses precluded further manufacture and sale of the Bullet cars. The interurban cars, as were ordinary streetcars, were delayed by traffic congestion in city streets. The interurban (and railroad) companies must build and maintain their own right-of-ways while roads for private cars and buses are paid by the taxpayers of which the railroad and interurban companies were among the greatest. In addition, a group named National City Lines but led by General Motors bought streetcar and interurban companies, dismantled the infrastructure and resold the companies to new owners who committed themselves to buy and use buses – from General Motors.

=== From New York to Utah ===
FJ&G's bright orange Bullets ran hourly into Schenectady where they terminated in front of the New York Central railroad station. In 1935, the FJ&G's Mohawk River bridge was condemned by New York State as too dangerous for any public transport as a result of river ice damage a decade earlier. Hence interurban service terminated at Scotia across the Mohawk from Schenectady. In 1936, the company abandoned passenger service. The five Bullets went to the Bamberger Railroad (BR) interurban in Utah and served the line from Salt Lake City–Ogden hourly, although operating at lower speeds than on the FJ&G. In 1952 the BR's shops burned, and the company ceased passenger traffic on September 6 that year. After being retired from railroad service, many railcars - including Bullets - were sold to the public as cheap “pre-fab” buildings. Some of both styles of Bullets are preserved in different museums. One is incorporated in a restaurant building in Springville, Utah.

=== Almost 60 years of service ===
Map of the Red Arrow Lines. Blue indicates the Norristown High Speed Line, where the Bullets ran from 1931 to 1990

If the Red Devil cars were the inspiration for the Bullets, in 1939 13 of the 20 Red Devils were sold to Lehigh Valley Transit Company (LVT), where for a time they shared the tracks from Norristown to 69th St. Terminal with P&W's Bullets. Under the name of Liberty Bell Limited, the Red Devils ran until LVT ended the service in 1951. Other high-speed interurban trains joined the Philadelphia suburban scene also. From the North Shore Line's Chicago–Milwaukee route a pair of high-speed streamliners named Electroliners were sent eastward in 1963, after 22 years and more than 3.3 million miles (5.3 million km) each – a mileage which probably surpassed any other interurban equipment. They were acquired by the Red Arrow Lines, which renamed them Liberty Liners and operated them in rush hour service on the P&W line until circa 1976. In their tavern-lounge cars commuters enjoyed continental breakfast in the morning and spirits and snacks in the afternoon. Different kinds of MU equipment in use on the Norristown line later resulted in the Bullets' being restricted to less busy times (weekends) when the ten of them could provide 100% of the service. Their lower profile, intended to reduce air resistance at high speed included a lower anticlimber (bumper) than other cars, and safety rules in the 1980s required the Bullets not to share the route with other cars.

The P&W's Bullets had a remarkably long life thanks to their build quality. P&W's excellent maintenance also contributed to reduced wear. Some Bullets survived until August 1990, when a special excursion was led by cars 206 and 209. They spent this time in an active role serving commuters in the Philadelphia area as part of the SEPTA rail stock. Today, Philadelphia's light rail system, which encompassed the surviving interurban lines (see Norristown High Speed Line) is number five in the U.S. by ridership.

== Preservation ==
In total, seven Brill Bullets have been preserved, with the majority on display in museums. All other units have been scrapped.

- Nos. 203, 207, and 208 are at the Seashore Trolley Museum.
- No. 205 is at the Rockhill Trolley Museum and, modified with trolley poles, is the only operating Brill Bullet.
- No. 206 is at the Electric City Trolley Museum in Scranton, Pennsylvania, and is on display just a few feet from the UP Big Boy steam locomotive at Steamtown.
- No. 209 is at the Pennsylvania Trolley Museum in Washington, Pennsylvania.
- No. 125 is owned by the Utah State Railroad Museum.
- No. 127 is at the Southern California Railway Museum.
- No. 128 is part of the Art City Trolley restaurant in Springville, Utah, but is barely recognizable as a Bullet.

The body of No. 204 was at the National Museum of Transportation in St. Louis, Missouri, but scrapped.
