= J. G. Brill Company =

Rolling stock manufacturer

Coordinates: 39.9273472°N 75.2291959°W

- Type: Privately held company
- Industry: Rail transport
- Genre: Public transport
- Founded: 1868
- Founder: John George Brill
- Defunct: 1954 (acquired by GE Transportation) (72 Years Ago)
- Headquarters: Philadelphia, Pennsylvania, United States
- Products: Streetcars (trams), interurban railcars, motor buses, and trolleybuses

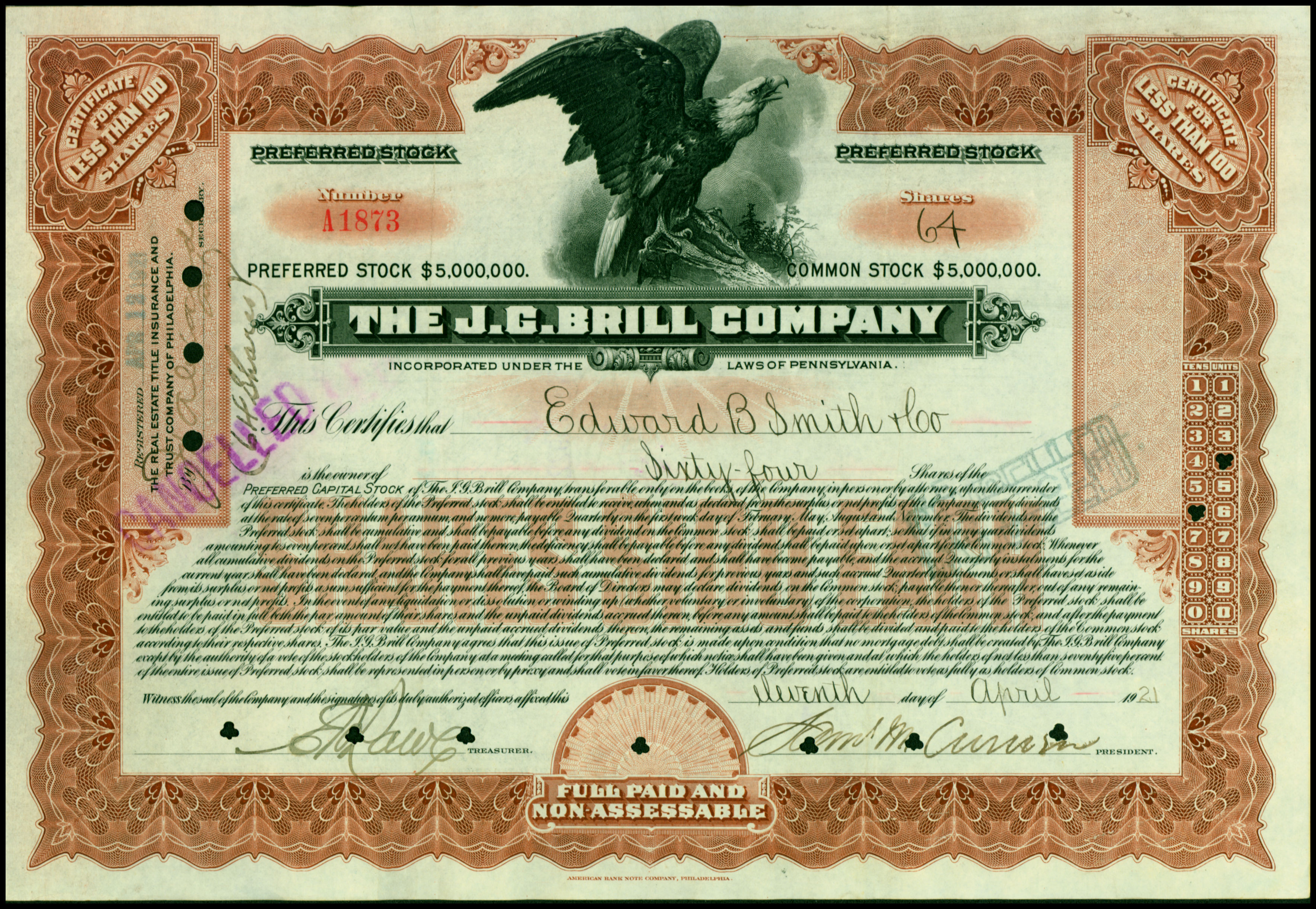
Share certificate issued by the J. G. Brill Company, issued on April 11, 1921

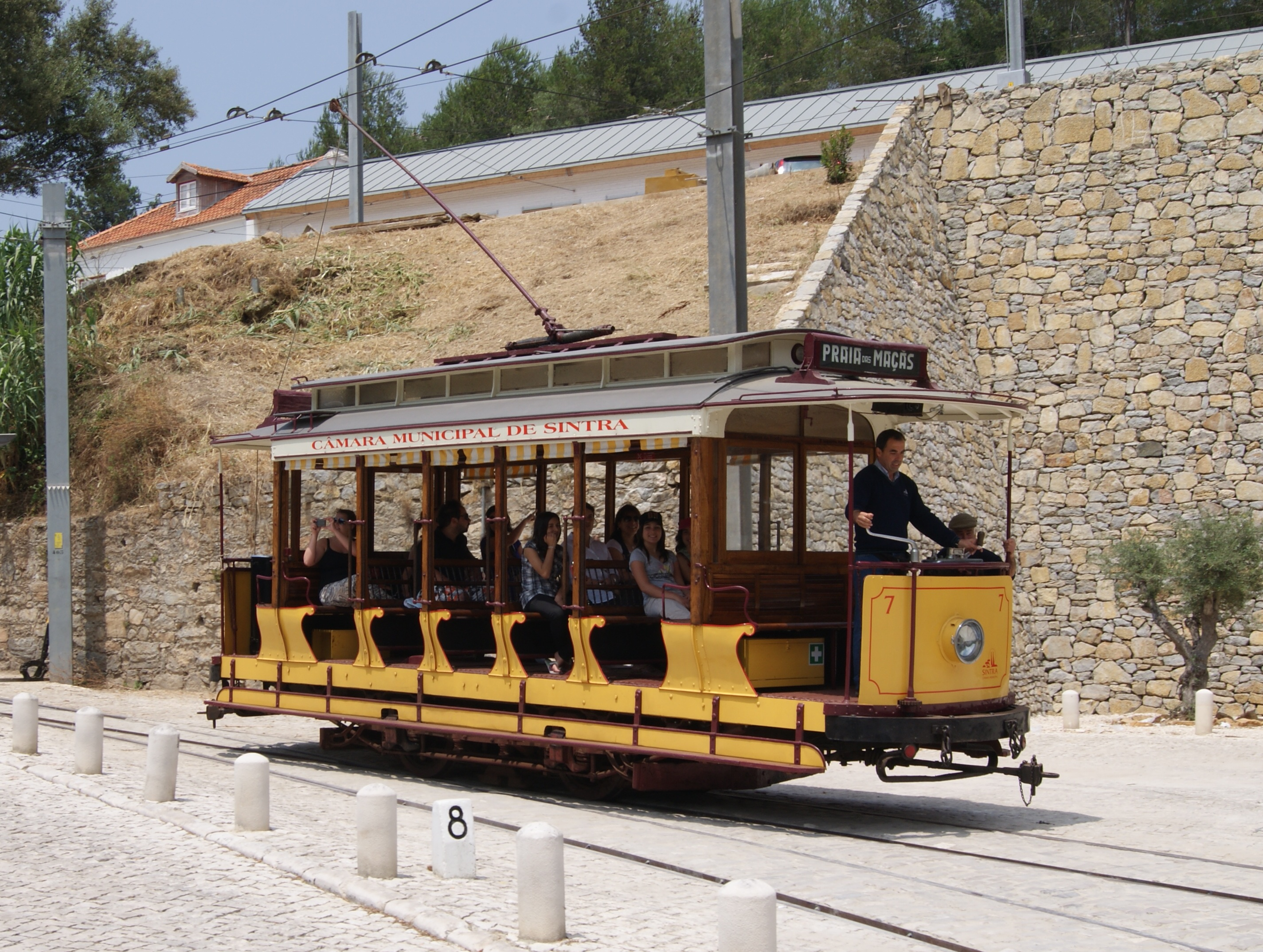
A 1903 Brill-built streetcar on a heritage streetcar line in Sintra, Portugal in 2010

The J. G. Brill Company was an American manufacturer of streetcars, interurban coaches, motor buses, trolleybuses and railroad cars. Operating in the United States for nearly 90 years, it became the longest-lasting trolley and interurban manufacturer in the country. During its peak years, Brill was the largest producer of streetcars and interurban cars in the United States, manufacturing more streetcars, interurbans, and gas-electric cars than any other company, including over 45,000 streetcars alone.

The company was founded by John George Brill in 1868 in Philadelphia, as a horsecar manufacturing firm. Its large factory complex was located in southwest Philadelphia at 62nd St and Woodland Avenue, adjacent to the Baltimore and Ohio Railroad tracks. At its peak of operation, it was one of Philadelphia's largest employers. Over the years, it absorbed numerous other manufacturers of trolleys and interurbans, such as Kuhlman in Cleveland and Jewett in Indiana. In 1944, with rail car business diminishing, it merged with the American Car and Foundry Company (ACF) to become ACF-Brill. Although the company ceased production in 1954, some of its interurbans served the Philadelphia area until the 1980s and similarly in Australia.

== History ==
=== Trolleys and interurban cars ===
In 1868, the Brill company was founded as J.G. Brill and Sons. After James Rawle joined the firm in 1872 it was renamed The J.G. Brill Company. In 1902, Brill bought out the American Car Company; in 1904, G. C. Kuhlman Car Company (Cleveland), then the John Stephenson Company (New Jersey); and in 1907 Wason Manufacturing Company (Massachusetts). Brill acquired a controlling share of the Danville Car Company in 1908, dissolving it in 1911, then the Canadian railway car builder Preston Car Company in 1921, which ceased operating in 1923. With rapid internal growth plus these acquisitions, Brill became the largest rail car manufacturer in the world. As large orders continued to be won, new facilities continued to be added in Philadelphia, including steel forges and cavernous erecting shops. Brill's primary (and large) plant was at 62nd and Woodland Ave., adjacent to the Baltimore and Ohio Railroad which it used for shipping its products. One particularly large order in 1911, was for 1,500 streetcars for the Philadelphia Rapid Transit Company. It took two years to build those trolleys, with delivery rates at times exceeding 100 cars a month. All told, more than 30,000 rail vehicles were produced at the Brill plant. In its best years, a workforce of 3,000 Philadelphians was employed by Brill, with many being skilled laborers and carpenter craftsmen. The Brill Company's primary competitors over the years were the St. Louis Car Company, the Cincinnati Car Company, and Pullman. Cincinnati was the first trolley manufacturer to use aluminum, this on the Cincinnati and Lake Erie's innovative lightweight and fast 1930 "Red Devils." These ended life on Pennsylvania's Lehigh Valley Transit. St Louis Car outlasted Brill by being a major builder of subway cars for Chicago and New York City. Pullman tended to build more massive cars, such as for Chicago's North Shore and South Shore lines.

=== Gas electric motor cars ===
Heavy weight full railroad-size gas electric cars capable of towing up to two trailers were manufactured using General Electric Company electrical equipment and various engine manufacturers, for branch line service that had minimal passenger traffic. This was to comply with U.S. Post Office contracts requiring reduced crew sizes. The Pennsylvania Railroad was a large purchaser.

=== Buses ===
The rapidly growing ownership and use of automobiles created a huge demand for paved roads and streets. Cities and towns struggling to cover the cost of these projects during the Great Depression applied "paving" taxes to the privately owned trolley and streetcar companies, which combined with lower ridership due to the Depression led to the bankruptcy of many trolley and streetcar railways, especially in smaller centres. In turn, this collapsed the demand for new trolleys and streetcars. Attempts by Brill to provide acceptable new designs went nowhere. The last rail cars built by J.G. Brill were 25 streamliner Brilliners for Atlantic City in 1939, and a final ten PCC-competitive Brilliner streetcars for Philadelphia's Red Arrow Lines two years later. Brill's production was dramatically shifted to rubber-tired vehicles. More than 8,000 gasoline- and electric-powered buses (trolley buses) were built in the 1940s. By the early 1950s the bus orders had diminished. In March 1954, the Brill plant was sold to the Penn Fruit Company and a strip mall was built on the eastern end of the site. In 1926, American Car and Foundry Company acquired a controlling interest in what had become the Brill Corporation. The new structure consisted of:

- ACF Motors Company, which owned Hall-Scott Motor Car Company (100%) and controlled 90% of Fageol Motors; and
- the J.G. Brill Company. In 1944, the two companies merged, forming the ACF-Brill Motors Company. In the same year, ACF-Brill licensed Canadian Car and Foundry of Montreal to manufacture and sell throughout Canada motor buses and trolley coaches of their design as Canadian Car-Brill. The firm built about 1,100 trolley buses and a few thousand buses under the name. Brill had earlier (in 1908) established a company in France (Cie. J.G. Brill of Gallardon, which was sold to Electroforge in 1935).

In 1946, Consolidated Vultee Aircraft Corporation acquired a controlling interest in ACF-Brill for $7.5 million. Consolidated Vultee was sold the following year to the Nashville Corporation, which in 1951 sold its share to investment firm Allen & Co. In early 1954, the Brill name disappeared when ACF-Brill ceased production and subcontracted its remaining orders. Brill granted licenses to build its vehicles to the Canadian Car and Foundry Company (Peter Witt streetcars, trolley buses and motor buses), and the South Australian Railways (Model 75 railcars).

== Products ==
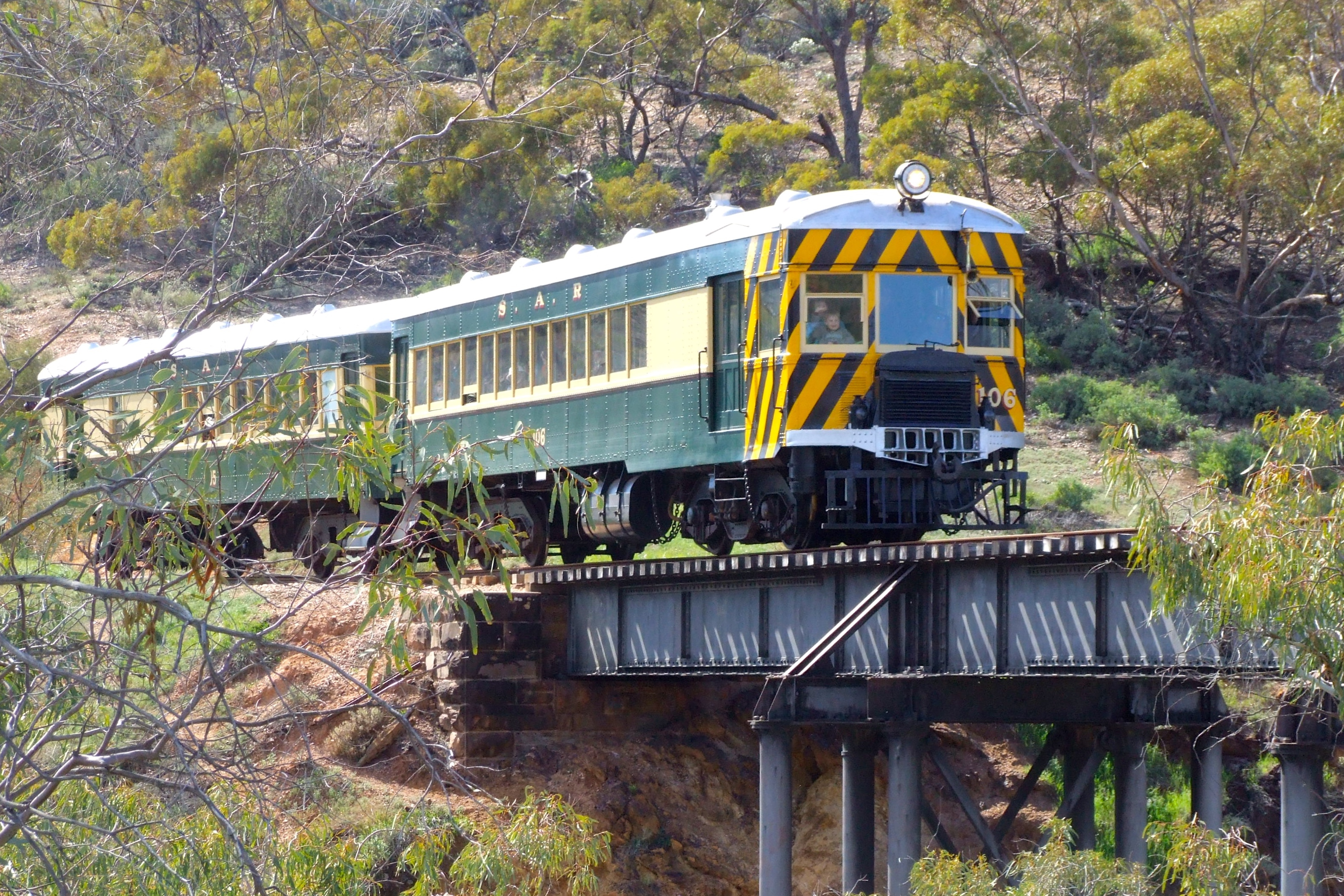
Preserved South Australian Railways narrow-bodied Brill Model 75 railcar no. 106 on the Pichi Richi Railway heritage line in 2006.

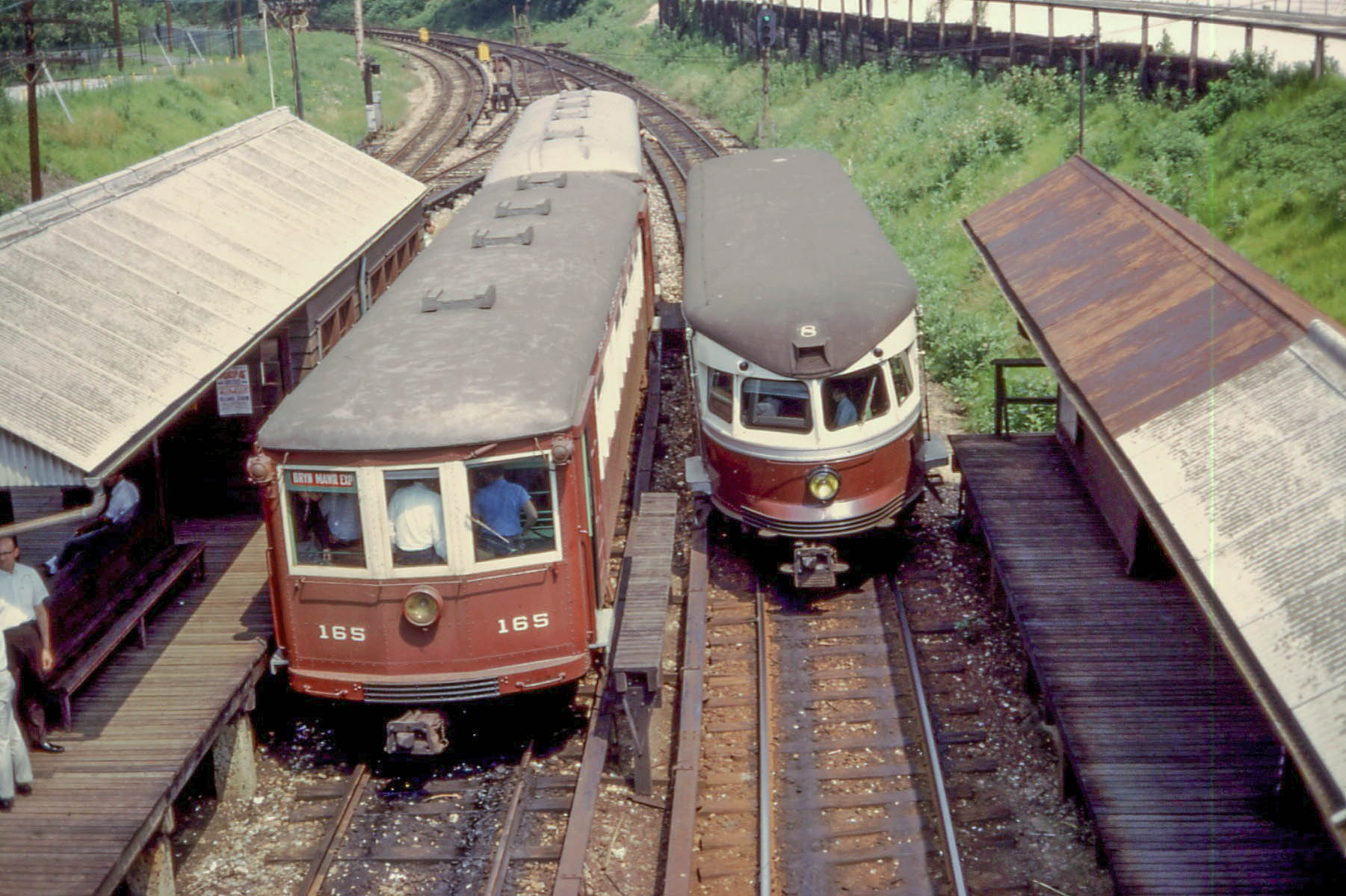
A Brill Bullet (right) passes a pair of "Strafford Cars" (left), Philadelphia, June 1968

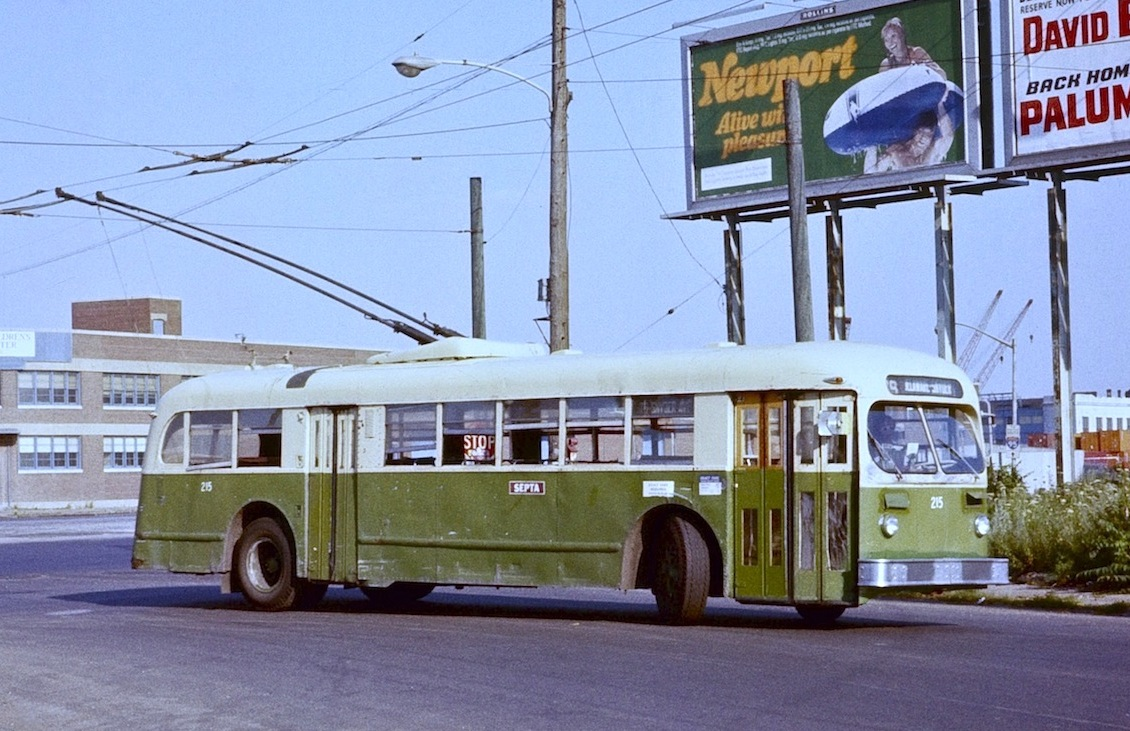
A 1947 ACF-Brill trolley bus in Philadelphia, 1978

- Birney safety car – by subsidiary, the American Car Company.
- Traditional arch-windowed, all-wood interurban cars. 1890-1920s.
- Model 55 (1924–38), Model 65 (1924) and Model 75 (1924–) railcars. Almost 300 were built for US and foreign railroads. A major purchaser was the South Australian Railways, which bought 12 Model 55 power cars plus trailers in 1924, followed in 1928 by 39 Model 75 power cars (all but the first being constructed in South Australia at the Islington Railway Workshops) plus trailers. The last was withdrawn from service in 1971.
- Steel heavy interurban cars built 1920-1930s. The Brill "Center Door" car was typical of suburban trolleys and interurbans built around 1920. These tended to be large, heavy, double-ended cars, with passengers entering and exiting via doors located at the center of the car. These cars required a two man crew, a conductor at the doors, and an operator. At a time of difficult financial conditions, in order to eliminate the conductor, many were rebuilt into one-man cars.
- Master Unit - built 1931-36. Steel frame with aluminum side construction to reduce weight, the Master Unit had a traditional GE or Westinghouse control stand and was capable of 70 mph. The 1930s Great Depression brought declining ridership and revenue to most streetcar companies. The answer was to reduce operating costs and keep going or to abandon outright. On the Philadelphia and West Chester interurban, their Master Unit purchase “80 cars,” as they were known, the lighter weight reduced electricity consumption. Built for one man operation.
- Brilliner – Brill's competitor to the PCC (Presidents' Conference Committee) car looked somewhat like the first PCCs and had a foot operated speed control like an automobile accelerator pedal. The Brilliner was not successful when compared to the PCC. Underpowered. Few were sold, whereas PCCs were well sold worldwide. Twenty-four built for Atlantic City's Miss America Fleet.
- Brill "Bullet" car, 1929–1932. For suburban/interurban use.
- Brill diners – Brill sold and designed diners, generally through one of its four subsidiaries, the Wason Manufacturing Company. The last one believed to be operating is the Capitol Diner in Lynn, Massachusetts, which is listed on the National Register of Historic Places.
- Peter Witt streetcar
  - Large cars with trailers
  - Small cars
- Numerous models of trolleybuses, including T30, T40, 40SMT, 44SMT and, as ACF-Brill, TC44 and T46/TC46
- C-36 city bus
- IC-41 intercity bus

== Bullet interurban cars ==
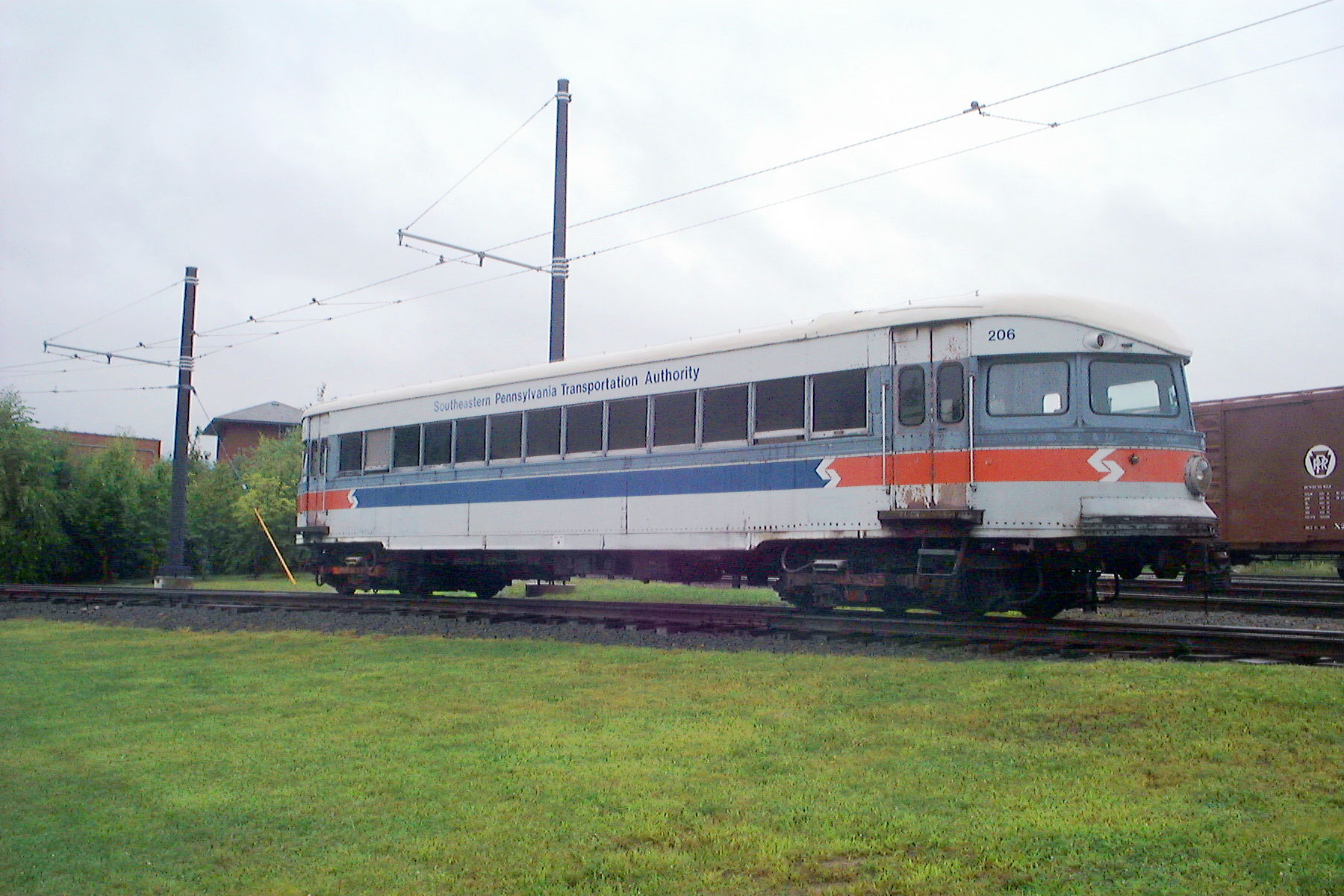
The streamlined interurban railcar Bullet from the P&W line. With a top speed at 92 mph (148 km/h) it was a forerunner of high-speed rail. No. 206 on display at Steamtown in Scranton, Pennsylvania.

The lines that operated interurban passenger cars recognized in the mid-1920s that they needed faster, quieter, more power-efficient equipment. Until then, the wooden and most of the steel interurban cars were large, sat high, and were heavy. Streetcars were slow, noisy, and clumsy to operate using the motor controller "stand" of the time. Car manufacturers such as Cincinnati Car Company (who already in 1922 made a lightweight, albeit slow, interurban), St. Louis Car Company, Pullman, and Brill worked to design equipment for a better ride at high speed, improved passenger comfort, and reduced power consumption. This particularly involved designing low-level trucks (bogies) able to handle rough track at speed. Brill, in conjunction with Westinghouse and General Electric, worked on a new interurban design and on a new streetcar design (the PCC).

The interurban design result was the aluminum-and-steel, wind-tunnel-developed, slope-roof "Bullet" multiple-unit cars, the first of which were purchased in 1931 by the Philadelphia and Western Railroad, a third-rail line running from 69th Street Upper Darby to Norristown in the Philadelphia region. This line still runs as SEPTA's Norristown High Speed Line. The Bullets could attain speeds as high as 92 mph (148 km/h). They were very successful, and operated until the 1980s, but Brill sold few others. Only the central New York state interurban Fonda, Johnstown, and Gloversville Railroad ordered Bullets, albeit a single-ended, single-unit "trolley-ized" version. Five were procured in mid-Depression 1932 for passenger business that was rapidly declining. In 1936, the closing FJ&G sold these Bullets to the Bamberger Railroad in Utah, which ran them in high-speed service between Salt Lake City and Ogden until the mid-1950s.

Three of the SEPTA Bullet cars are now at the Seashore Trolley Museum. One is at the Electric City Trolley Museum in Scranton. The only operational Bullet car, No. 205, may be ridden at the Rockhill Trolley Museum in Orbisonia, Pennsylvania. One was at the National Museum of Transportation in St. Louis, Missouri, but was scrapped. One is at the Pennsylvania Trolley Museum in Washington, Pennsylvania. A Bamberger Bullet is in the Southern California Railway Museum in Perris, California, and another has been preserved by the Utah State Railroad Museum. A third is a part of a restaurant building in Springville, Utah, but is barely recognizable as a Bullet.

Brill also manufactured the Pack Howitzer 75 mm cannon for the U.S. Military during the years between WWI and WWII.

== Brill look-alike cars in the 2010s ==
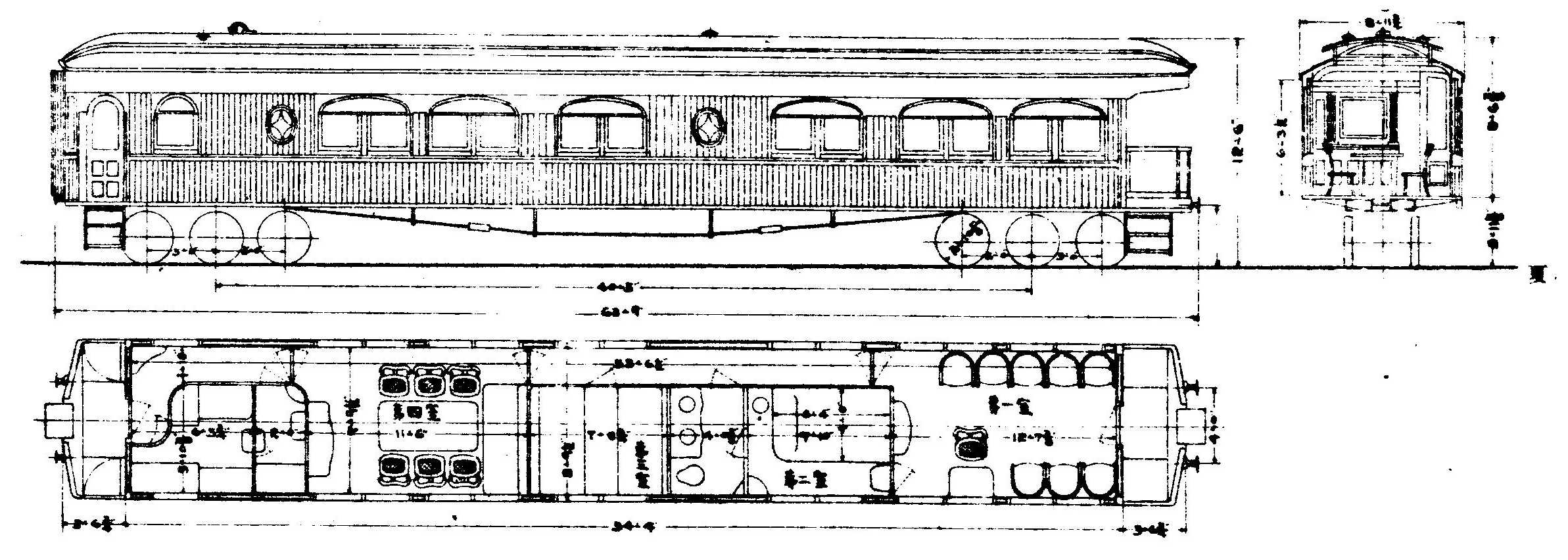
Observation car Sutoku 9000 of the original "Aru Ressha"

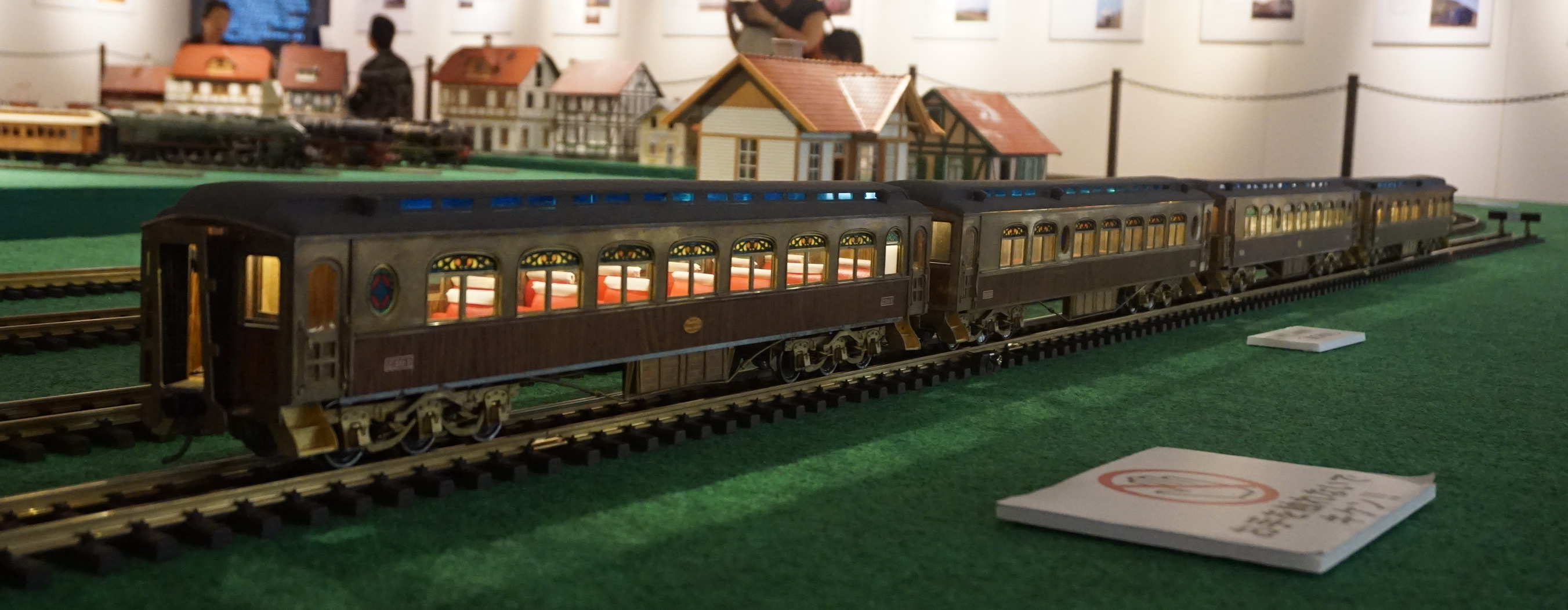
Scale models of the Aru Ressha Brill cars

Since 2015 the Kyushu Railway Company, one of the constituent companies of the Japan Railways Group, has operated the Aru Ressha "sweet train", a deluxe excursion train. It comprises two power cars and two newly built trailer cars based on a set of 5 luxury Brill cars the original Kyushu Railway ordered in 1908 but never used before nationalization. Scale models of the original cars at the Hara Model Railway Museum were used to derive the design.

== See also ==
- Frankfort and Cincinnati Model 55 Rail Car
- List of tram builders
- List of rolling stock manufacturers

== Bibliography ==
- Middleton, William D. The Interurban Era, Kalmbach Publishing Company, Milwaukee, 2000 [1965]. ISBN 9780890240038. (Coverage: list of US interurban car manufacturers, pp 416–417; Bullet design, pp 68–70.)
- Volkmer, William D. Pennsylvania Trolleys in Color, Morning Sun Books, Scotch Plains, 1998. Vol. 2. ISBN 978-1878887993. (Coverage: photographs of Brilliners, Bullets and other Brill designs, on Philadelphia and Western line and in shops.)
- Hilton, George W. & Due, John F. The Electric Interurban Railways in America, Stanford University Press, Stanford, reissue 2000. ISBN 9780804740142. (Coverage: development of improved interurban car design.)
- Springirth, Kenneth C. Suburban Philadelphia Trolleys, Arcadia Publishing, Charleston, 2007. ISBN 9780738550435. (Coverage: development of Bullet design.)
- Bradford, Francis H. & Dias, Ric A. Hall-Scott: the untold story of a great American engine maker, SAE International Book Publishing, Warrendale, 2007. ISBN 9780768016604.
