= John George Brill =

- Born: May 31, 1817; Kassel, Germany
- Died: September 22, 1888 (aged 71); Philadelphia County, Pennsylvania
- Occupations: Businessman, engineer

John George Brill (German: Johann Georg Brill) (Kassel, Germany, May 31, 1817 – September 22, 1888) was a co-founder of J. G. Brill and Company, which, at its height, was the largest manufacturer of streetcars and interurban cars in the United States.

In 1847, at the age of 30, he emigrated with his wife and two children from Germany to Philadelphia. For twenty years, he worked for Murphy and Allison. In 1868, with his son George Martin Brill, he founded the firm J. G. Brill & Son, which, in 1887, became J. G. Brill and Company.

== Death and interment ==
Brill died from heart failure at the age of 71 in Philadelphia County, Pennsylvania on September 22, 1888, and was buried on September 25 at the West Laurel Hill Cemetery in Bala Cynwyd, Montgomery County, Pennsylvania.
