= Brilliner =

Tram designed by the J. G. Brill Company

Brilliner was a trolley designed by the J. G. Brill Company. The trolley was designed to be a competitor to the successful PCC cars, but the design ended up being a failure for the company, with only several Trolleys built. The Trolley utilized a clean, streamlined design, similar to a PCC car. It also used a boxy floor plan and a riveted steel body design. Due to the boxy floor plan, Brilliner cars could not clear the tight spaces required by the Philadelphia Transportation Company (PTC), the company's main customer. The Brilliner was the company's last trolley design before merging with American Car and Foundry (ACF).

10 cars were built for Red Arrow Lines (these were the only double-ended variants as every other car was single-ended), 24 Trolleys were sold to Atlantic City, 3 cars were sold to the PTC, and one of each was sold to Cincinnati and Baltimore. One streetcar, Red Arrow Lines 5, is now on display at the Pennsylvania Trolley Museum.

== Gallery ==
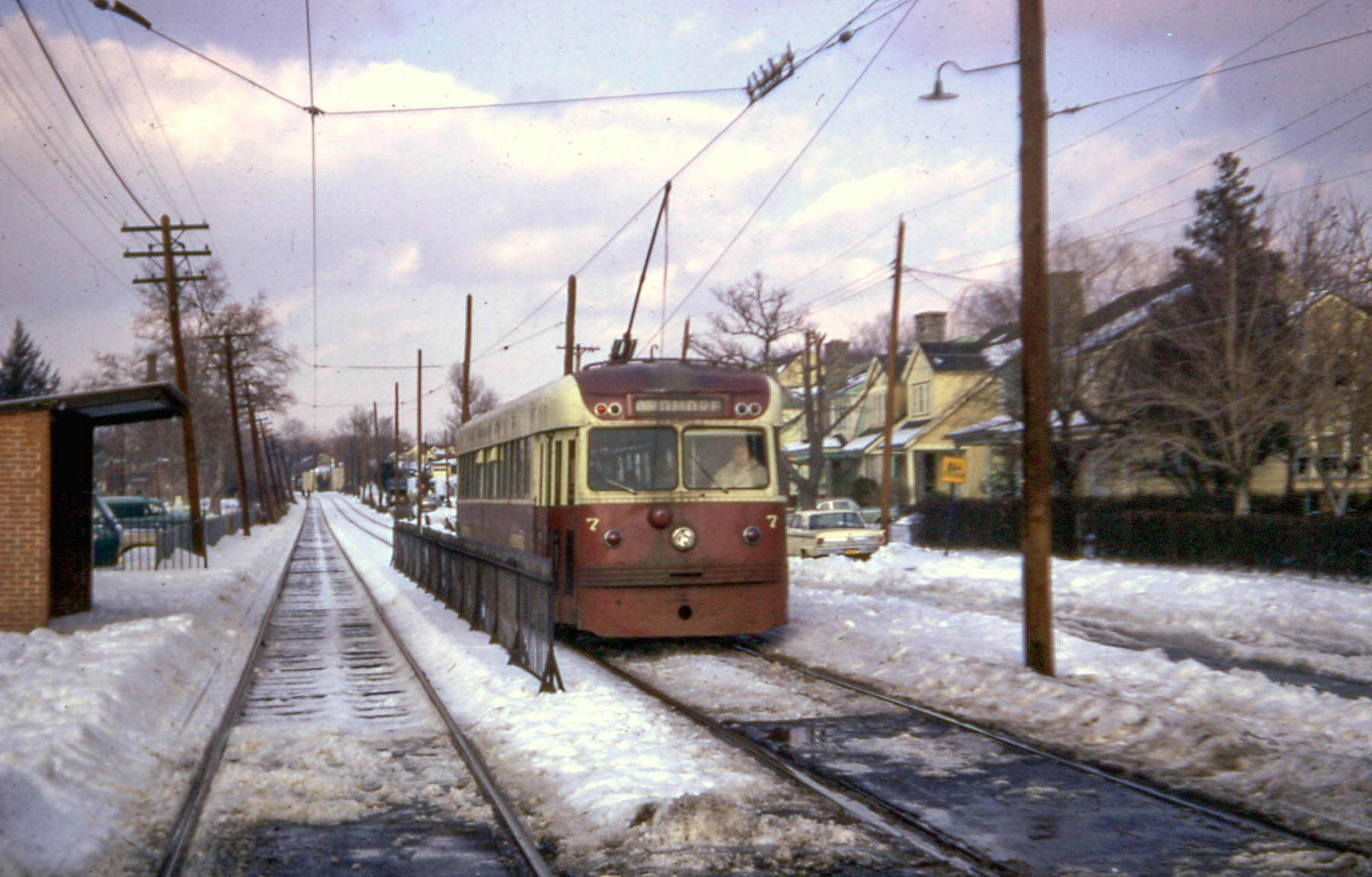
A Brilliner in service on the now-defunct Philadelphia Ardmore tram route (Route 103).

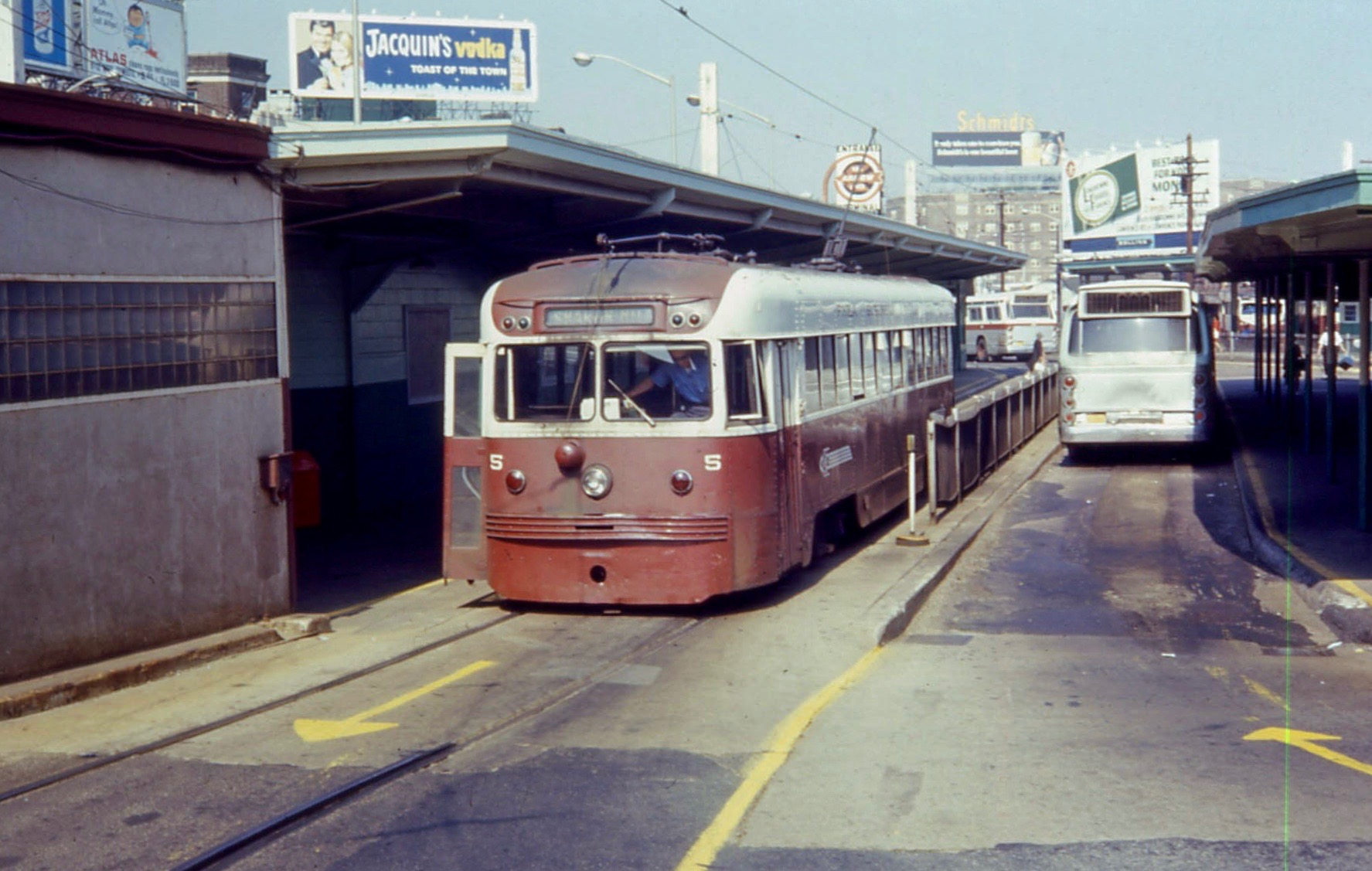
A Brilliner in service with the suburban Philadelphia Red Arrow Lines at 69th Street Terminal.
