= National Register of Historic Places listings in Herkimer County, New York =

Location of Herkimer County in New York

List of the National Register of Historic Places listings in Herkimer County, New York

This is intended to be a complete list of properties and districts listed on the National Register of Historic Places in Herkimer County, New York. The locations of National Register properties and districts (at least for all showing latitude and longitude coordinates below) may be seen in a map by clicking on "Map of all coordinates". Two districts are further designated a National Historic Landmark (NHL), and part of the county is included in the Adirondack Forest Preserve, another NHL.

This National Park Service list is complete through NPS recent listings posted February 6, 2026.

Contents: Counties in New York
Albany (Albany) – Allegany – Bronx – Broome – Cattaraugus – Cayuga – Chautauqua – Chemung – Chenango – Clinton – Columbia – Cortland – Delaware – Dutchess (Poughkeepsie, Rhinebeck) – Erie (Buffalo) – Essex – Franklin – Fulton – Genesee – Greene – Hamilton – Herkimer – Jefferson – Kings – Lewis – Livingston – Madison – Monroe (Rochester) – Montgomery – Nassau – New York (Below 14th Street, 14th to 59th Streets, 59th to 110th Streets, Above 110th Street, Islands) – Niagara (Niagara Falls) – Oneida – Onondaga (Syracuse) – Ontario – Orange – Orleans – Oswego – Otsego – Putnam – Queens – Rensselaer – Richmond – Rockland – St. Lawrence – Saratoga – Schenectady – Schoharie – Schuyler – Seneca – Steuben – Suffolk – Sullivan – Tioga – Tompkins – Ulster – Warren – Washington – Wayne – Westchester (Northern, Southern, New Rochelle, Peekskill, Yonkers) – Wyoming – Yates

== Listings county-wide ==
	Name on the Register	Image	Date listed	Location	City or town	Description
1	Adirondack Forest Preserve	Adirondack Forest Preserve	October 15, 1966 (#66000891)	Northeast New York State; 43°58′43″N 75°04′44″W		The county contains 558,875 acres (2,261.69 km^{2}) that are part of the six million acre (24,000 km²) Adirondack Park.
2	Balloon Farm	Balloon Farm	April 23, 1998 (#98000391)	128 Cemetery Rd. 43°00′01″N 75°07′36″W	Frankfort	
3	Big Moose Community Chapel	Big Moose Community Chapel	August 7, 2012 (#12000478)	1544 Big Moose Rd. 43°49′03″N 74°52′43″W	Big Moose	
4	Blatchley House		August 15, 2008 (#08000770)	370 Blatchley Rd. 42°54′13″N 74°56′02″W	Vicinity of Jordanville	
5	Bonfoy–Barstow House	Bonfoy–Barstow House	August 24, 2011 (#11000595)	485 E. Main St. 42°54′10″N 75°11′13″W	West Winfield	
6	Benjamin Bowen House	Benjamin Bowen House	November 5, 1998 (#98001342)	7482 Main St. 43°11′16″N 75°03′09″W	Newport	
7	Brace Farm		June 5, 2013 (#13000356)	428 Brace Rd. 42°55′50″N 75°10′04″W	Meetinghouse Green	
8	Breckwoldt-Ward House	Breckwoldt-Ward House	March 15, 2005 (#05000164)	90 Van Buren St. 43°05′41″N 74°46′10″W	Dolgeville	Home of George Ward, who prosecuted Chester Gillette for the murder of Grace Brown in 1906, the case which served as the model for Theodore Dreiser's An American Tragedy. Now a bed and breakfast operated by Ward's great-grandson
9	Camp Veery		July 28, 2020 (#100009171)	100 Echo Island; 43°49′22″N 74°52′15″W	Eagle Bay vicinity	
10	James H. Case III and Laura Rockefeller Case House		September 3, 2019 (#100004334)	2333 NY 80; 42°53′58″N 74°49′38″W	Van Hornesville	Early 1960s modernist summer house was first major commission for architect Willis N. Mills Jr.
11	Cedar Lake Methodist Episcopal Church		August 17, 2020 (#100005464)	548 Goodier Rd. 42°57′30″N 75°10′47″W	Cedar Lake	
12	Church of the Good Shepherd	Church of the Good Shepherd	August 21, 1997 (#97000943)	Junction of NY 167 and Earl St. 42°52′57″N 74°57′48″W	Cullen	
13	Cold Brook Feed Mill	Cold Brook Feed Mill	October 9, 1974 (#74001243)	NY 8; 43°14′23″N 75°02′29″W	Cold Brook	
14	Covewood Lodge	Covewood Lodge	May 12, 2004 (#04000435)	120 Covewood Lodge Rd. 43°49′00″N 74°51′08″W	Big Moose	
15	Alfred Dolge Hose Co. No. 1 Building	Alfred Dolge Hose Co. No. 1 Building	August 19, 1994 (#94001003)	Junction of S. Main and Slawson Sts., southwest corner 43°06′00″N 74°46′28″W	Dolgeville	
16	Dolgeville Universalist Church		August 9, 2024 (#100010614)	78 South Main St; 43°06′00″N 74°46′26″W	Dolgeville	
17	Emmanuel Episcopal Church	Emmanuel Episcopal Church	July 29, 2009 (#09000574)	588 Albany St. 43°02′39″N 74°51′19″W	Little Falls	
18	First United Methodist Church	First United Methodist Church	July 5, 2003 (#03000601)	36 Second St. 43°00′49″N 75°02′21″W	Ilion	
19	Fort Herkimer Church	Fort Herkimer Church	July 24, 1972 (#72000843)	NY 5S; 43°01′05″N 74°57′16″W	East Herkimer	
20	Frankfort Hill District No. 10 School		June 23, 2011 (#11000401)	2235 Albany Rd. 43°02′04″N 75°11′05″W	Frankfort Hill vicinity	
21	Frankfort Town Hall	Frankfort Town Hall	December 9, 1999 (#99001486)	140 S. Litchfield St. 43°02′20″N 75°04′23″W	Frankfort	
22	Augustus Frisbie House	Augustus Frisbie House	December 9, 1999 (#99001487)	NY 29A; 43°08′34″N 74°47′13″W	Salisbury Center	
23	Goodsell House	Goodsell House	April 12, 2006 (#06000265)	2993 Main St. 43°42′27″N 74°58′44″W	Old Forge	
24	Herkimer County Courthouse	Herkimer County Courthouse	January 14, 1972 (#72000844)	320 N. Main St. 43°01′44″N 74°59′22″W	Herkimer	
25	Herkimer County Historical Society	Herkimer County Historical Society	April 13, 1972 (#72000845)	400 N. Main St. 43°01′45″N 74°59′22″W	Herkimer	
26	Herkimer County Jail	Herkimer County Jail	January 14, 1972 (#72000846)	327 N. Main St. 43°01′42″N 74°59′24″W	Herkimer	
27	Herkimer County Trust Company Building	Herkimer County Trust Company Building	March 5, 1970 (#70000421)	Corner of Ann and Albany Sts. 43°02′34″N 74°51′33″W	Little Falls	
28	Herkimer House	Herkimer House	February 12, 1971 (#71000539)	Near NY 5 S. 43°01′40″N 74°48′52″W	Danube	Built in the 1750s by Nicholas Herkimer, who died there in 1777. In 1834, the house was owned by Herkimer's nephew, John Herkimer.
29	Hildreth Homestead		November 23, 2020 (#100005830)	4083 NY 28; 43°06′07″N 74°59′18″W	Herkimer	
30	Holy Trinity Monastery	Holy Trinity Monastery	June 23, 2011 (#09000286)	1407 Robinson Road; 42°55′39″N 74°56′02″W	Jordanville vicinity	Russian Orthodox monastery established in 1928 is one of the largest in the country and home to only remaining pre-1918 Russian language printing press.
31	Indian Castle Church	Indian Castle Church	February 18, 1971 (#71000540)	NY 5S; 43°00′10″N 74°46′40″W	Indian Castle	
32	Italian Community Bake Oven		November 8, 2006 (#06001003)	NY 167; 43°02′21″N 74°50′02″W	Little Falls	
33	Jordanville Public Library	Jordanville Public Library	May 24, 1984 (#84002397)	Main St. 42°54′56″N 74°56′51″W	Jordanville	
34	James Keith House and Brown–Morey–Davis Farm		January 15, 2014 (#13001090)	2615 & 2608 Newport Rd; 43°10′11″N 75°01′08″W	Newport	
35	Lalino Stone Arch Bridge		December 28, 2001 (#01001397)	319 NY 29; 43°08′14″N 74°56′42″W	Middleville	
36	Library Bureau-Remington Rand-Sperry UNIVAC Manufacturing Complex		February 12, 2021 (#100006144)	7 Spruce St. 43°01′13″N 75°02′06″W	Ilion	
37	Little Falls City Hall	Little Falls City Hall	August 24, 2011 (#11000596)	659 E. Main St. 43°02′40″N 74°51′20″W	Little Falls	
38	Little Falls Historic District	Little Falls Historic District	February 8, 2012 (#12000013)	Roughly bounded by W. Monroe, W. Gansevoort, Prospect, Garden, E. Main, N. William, & Loomis St. 43°02′36″N 74°51′35″W	Little Falls	
39	Masonic Temple — Newport Lodge No. 445 F. & A.M.	Masonic Temple — Newport Lodge No. 445 F. & A.M.	January 13, 2010 (#09001228)	7408 NY 28; 43°10′51″N 75°00′38″W	Newport	
40	Meetinghouse Green Road Cemetery		June 5, 2013 (#13000357)	Cross and Meeting House Rds. 42°55′08″N 75°09′50″W	Meetinghouse Green vicinity	
41	Menge House Complex	Menge House Complex	December 16, 1996 (#96001425)	98 Van Buren St. 43°05′38″N 74°46′12″W	Dolgeville	
42	Mohawk Upper Castle Historic District	Mohawk Upper Castle Historic District	November 4, 1993 (#93001621)	Address Restricted	Danube	The district, declared a National Historic Landmark in 1993, includes the Indian Castle Church as well as archaeological sites. Upper Castle was a fortified village. The Indian Castle Church, built in 1769, is the only colonial Indian missionary church surviving in New York State, and is the only Iroquois building surviving from its time.
43	Newport Stone Arch Bridge	Newport Stone Arch Bridge	February 10, 1992 (#91002035)	Bridge St. across West Canada Creek; 43°11′06″N 75°01′04″W	Newport	
44	New York Central Railroad Adirondack Division Historic District	New York Central Railroad Adirondack Division Historic District	December 23, 1993 (#93001451)	NYCRR Right-of-Way; 43°42′02″N 75°00′09″W	Thendara	The New York Central passed through McKeever, Thendara, Big Moose Station, Beaver River, and Brandreth, and stations exist at Thendara and Big Moose. The Adirondack Scenic Railroad runs trains between Utica and Thendara.
45	New York State Barge Canal	New York State Barge Canal	October 15, 2014 (#14000860)	Linear across county 43°00′56″N 74°59′39″W	Little Falls, Danube, Frankfort, German Flatts, Herkimer, Ilion, Mannheim, Mohawk, Ohio, Russia, Schuyler	Successor to Erie Canal approved by state voters in early 20th century to compete with railroads; listing includes two of canal's reservoirs in Adirondacks.
46	Norway Baptist Church (former)	Norway Baptist Church (former)	June 29, 2007 (#07000622)	1067 Newport-Gray Rd. 43°12′25″N 74°57′11″W	Norway	
47	Oak Hill Cemetery		August 23, 2013 (#13000627)	W. German St. 43°01′17″N 75°00′18″W	Herkimer vicinity	
48	Old City Road Stone Arch Bridge	Old City Road Stone Arch Bridge	December 28, 2001 (#01001398)	Old City Rd. 43°09′51″N 74°59′08″W	Welch Corners	
49	Overlook	Overlook	July 19, 2010 (#10000484)	1 Overlook Drive; 43°03′00″N 74°51′32″W	Little Falls	
50	Palatine German Frame House	Palatine German Frame House	April 15, 2004 (#04000282)	4217 NY 5; 43°01′42″N 75°02′35″W	Herkimer	
51	Stuart Perry and William Swezey Houses		November 28, 2012 (#12000982)	7541 & 7551 Main St. 43°11′27″N 75°01′09″W	Newport	
52	H.M. Quackenbush Factory	H.M. Quackenbush Factory	August 15, 2022 (#100008003)	405 N. Main St. 43°01′36″N 74°59′21″W	Herkimer	
53	The Reformed Church	The Reformed Church	March 16, 1972 (#72000847)	405 N. Main St. 43°01′44″N 74°59′25″W	Herkimer	
54	Remington House	Remington House	August 21, 1997 (#97000942)	1279 Upper Barringer Rd. 42°59′28″N 75°05′10″W	Kinne Corners	
55	Remington Stables	Remington Stables	October 29, 1976 (#76001222)	1 Remington Ave. 43°00′44″N 75°02′07″W	Ilion	
56	Rice–Dodge–Burgess Farm		November 24, 2015 (#15000821)	588 NY 51; 42°54′48″N 75°07′11″W	Cedarville	Well-preserved 1820s farm complex
57	Thomas Richardson House	Thomas Richardson House	September 7, 1984 (#84002400)	317 W. Main St. 43°01′11″N 75°02′52″W	Ilion	
58	Route 29 Stone Arch Bridge	Route 29 Stone Arch Bridge	January 26, 2001 (#00001685)	NY 29; 43°08′15″N 74°56′59″W	Middleville	
59	Russia Corners Historic District	Russia Corners Historic District	July 25, 1996 (#96000815)	Roughly, junction of Military and Beecher Rds. 43°15′27″N 75°04′48″W	Russia	
60	Salisbury Center Covered Bridge	Salisbury Center Covered Bridge	June 19, 1972 (#72000848)	Fairview Rd. over Spruce Creek; 43°08′27″N 74°47′17″W	Salisbury Center	
61	Salisbury Center Grange Hall	Salisbury Center Grange Hall	February 12, 1999 (#99000056)	2550 NY 29; 43°08′32″N 74°47′18″W	Salisbury Center	
62	James Sanders House	James Sanders House	April 12, 2006 (#06000255)	546 Garden St. 43°02′43″N 74°51′28″W	Little Falls	
63	Snells Bush Church and Cemetery	Snells Bush Church and Cemetery	February 26, 2004 (#04000092)	Snells Bush Rd. 43°02′18″N 74°46′26″W	Manheim	
64	South Ann Street-Mill Street Historic District	South Ann Street-Mill Street Historic District	March 6, 2008 (#08000139)	S. Ann & Mill Sts. 43°02′28″N 74°51′32″W	Little Falls	
65	Stillwater Mountain Fire Observation Station	Stillwater Mountain Fire Observation Station	September 18, 2017 (#100001624)	1 mi. off Big Moose Rd. 43°51′42″N 75°02′01″W	Webb	Rock at base of 1919 tower has bolts and guide holes from Verplanck Colvin's 1882 Adirondack survey
66	Sunset Hill		January 4, 2007 (#06001205)	102 NY 167; 42°51′28″N 74°58′50″W	Warren	
67	Thendara Historic District	Thendara Historic District	November 10, 2010 (#10000897)	Roughly bounded by Birch St. and Forge St. 43°42′02″N 74°59′42″W	Thendara	
68	Trinity Episcopal Church-Fairfield	Trinity Episcopal Church-Fairfield	June 10, 1993 (#93000499)	NY 29 (Salisbury St.); 43°08′09″N 74°54′41″W	Fairfield	
69	US Post Office-Dolgeville	US Post Office-Dolgeville	November 17, 1988 (#88002486)	41 S. Main St. 43°06′01″N 74°46′22″W	Dolgeville	part of the US Post Offices in New York State, 1858-1943, Thematic Resource (TR)
70	US Post Office-Frankfort	US Post Office-Frankfort	May 11, 1989 (#88002512)	130 E. Main St. 43°02′18″N 75°04′15″W	Frankfort	part of the US Post Offices in New York State, 1858-1943, TR
71	US Post Office-Herkimer	US Post Office-Herkimer	May 11, 1989 (#88002501)	135 Park Ave. 43°01′33″N 74°59′18″W	Herkimer	part of the US Post Offices in New York State, 1858-1943, TR
72	US Post Office-Ilion	US Post Office-Ilion	May 11, 1989 (#88002513)	48 First St. 43°00′53″N 75°02′15″W	Ilion	part of the US Post Offices in New York State, 1858-1943, TR
73	US Post Office-Little Falls	US Post Office-Little Falls	May 11, 1989 (#88002343)	25 W. Main St. 43°02′34″N 74°51′38″W	Little Falls	part of the US Post Offices in New York State, 1858-1943, TR
74	Van Slyke House		November 8, 2021 (#100007104)	918 NY 5S; 43°00′47″N 74°55′52″W	German Falls	
75	West Winfield Historic District		January 28, 2026 (#100012672)	East and West Main St. North and South St. Carrier St. Academy St. Water St. Fenn St. Pleasant St. 42°53′07″N 75°11′36″W	Winfield	
76	Yale-Cady Octagon House and Yale Lock Factory Site	Yale-Cady Octagon House and Yale Lock Factory Site	September 29, 2007 (#07001019)	7550 N. Main St. 43°11′34″N 75°01′06″W	Newport	An octagonal house and the adjoining site of the lock factory of Linus Yale Sr. and his son Linus Yale Jr., the inventor of the cylinder lock. Linus Yale Sr. built the house in 1849 as a gift for his daughter.
77	Zoller-Frasier Round Barn		September 29, 1984 (#84002401)	Fords Bush Rd. 42°58′21″N 74°46′34″W	Newville	part of the Central Plan Dairy Barns of New York TR

== See also ==
- National Register of Historic Places listings in New York
