= Donald J. Mitchell =

American politician (1923–2003)

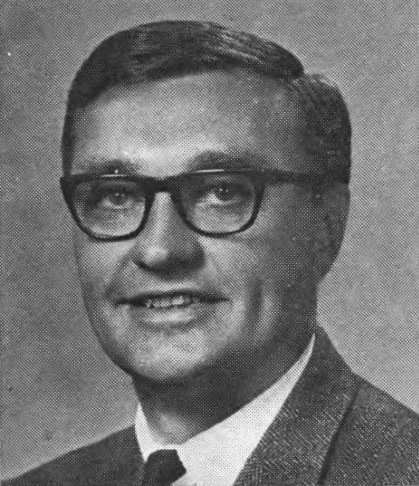

Member of the U.S. House of Representatives from New York's 31st district
- In office January 3, 1973 – January 3, 1983
- Preceded by: Alexander Pirnie (redistricting)
- Succeeded by: Sherwood Boehlert (redistricting)

Member of the New York State Assembly from the Herkimer County district
- In office January 1, 1965 – December 31, 1965
- Preceded by: Leo A. Lawrence
- Succeeded by: District abolished
- In office January 1, 1966 – December 31, 1966
- Preceded by: new district
- Succeeded by: Louis H. Folmer
- In office January 1, 1967 – November 7, 1972
- Preceded by: Harvey M. Lifset
- Succeeded by: K. Daniel Haley

Personal details
- Born: Donald Jerome Mitchell; May 8, 1923 Ilion, New York, U.S.
- Died: September 27, 2003 (aged 80) Little Falls, New York, U.S.
- Party: Republican
- Spouse: Margaretta Wilson LeVee (m. 1945)
- Children: 3
- Education: Hobart College; Columbia University
- Occupation: Politician; optometrist

Donald Jerome "Don" Mitchell (May 8, 1923 – September 27, 2003) was an American politician. He represented New York in the United States House of Representatives from 1973 to 1983.

== Early life ==
Mitchell, a native of Central Upstate New York's Mohawk Valley, with ancestral family roots tracing back to the American Revolution, was born in Ilion, New York, in 1923.

The oldest child of Donald J. Mitchell and Winnifred Packard Mitchell of Herkimer, New York, he attended the Herkimer Public School System, graduating in 1940 from Herkimer High School, which had been founded in 1899.

In 1945, after returning home from his military service during World War II, Mitchell married Margaretta "Gretta" Wilson LeVee, the daughter of E. Allen LeVee and Margaret Tinker LeVee, of Little Falls, New York. (Note: Mrs. Mitchell (née LeVee), a cousin to President Woodrow Wilson, is also related to Thomas Tinker who came to America aboard the Mayflower cf. Mayflower Manifest: "Passenger List:... Thomas Tinker; the Wife of Thomas Tinker; the Son of Thomas Tinker".)

Married for over 57 years at the time of the Congressman's death in 2003, the Mitchells had three children – Gretchen, Cynthia, and Allen – and two grandchildren, Susan and Lisa.

=== Military service ===
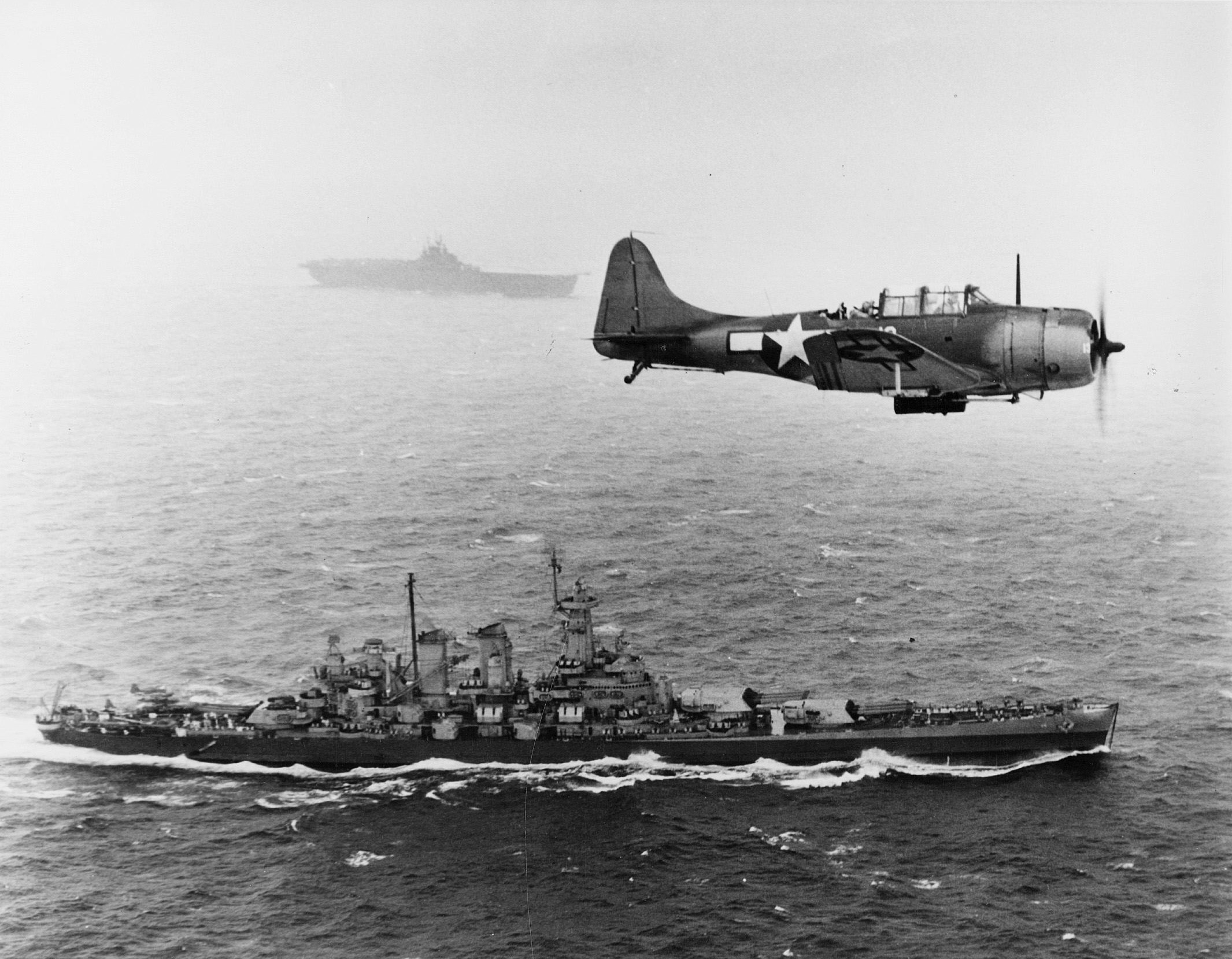
Carrier-based US Navy Air Corps pilot flies an Aircraft carrier, 1943

During World War II, Mitchell served as a carrier-based fighter pilot in the United States Navy from 1942 until 1945. An avid pilot in private life, Dr. Mitchell re-enlisted in the Navy in 1951, and served as a Naval Flight Instructor in Pensacola, Florida, from 1951–1953, during the Korean War.

== Professional career / Civic service ==
Following his military service in World War II, Mitchell completed a bachelor's degree in Optometry at Hobart College in 1949, and earned a master's degree from Columbia University in 1950. In the early 1950s he founded an optometry practice in Herkimer, New York.

In 1954, he was elected to the Herkimer City Council (1954–1957), and served as Mayor of Herkimer from 1957 to 1960. He was also active in numerous civic and charitable organizations. Among those were: the Boy Scouts of America, the American Civil Defense Association, the Central Association for the Blind, the Eastern New York Chapter of the Nature Conservancy, the Mohawk Valley Chapter of the American Red Cross, the American Cancer Society, the United Way, and the Herkimer County Historical Society. Additionally, he served as a member of the Herkimer Zoning Board of Appeals from 1963 until 1964, until elected to the New York State Assembly.

== New York State Assembly ==
In 1964, Mitchell was elected to represent Herkimer County in the New York State Assembly.

He was a member of the State Assembly from 1965 to 1972, serving in the 175th, 176th, 177th, 178th and 179th New York State Legislatures. He served in the Republican leadership as the Assembly's Majority Whip from 1969 to 1972.

== United States Congress ==
U.S. House Committee on Armed Services emblem

In 1972, Mitchell was elected to the United States Congress where he represented what is now New York's 31st Congressional District. After being successfully re-elected to a second term by a wide margin in 1974, he then ran unopposed to for three more terms, serving in Congress a total of 10 years from January 3, 1973, until January 3, 1983.

While in the U.S. Congress, Mitchell served on the House Armed Services Committee, and was elected by his colleagues and served four years in the House Republican Leadership as Regional Whip for New England and the Mid-Atlantic States.

Mitchell was also a founder of, and the first Chairman of the Northeast/Midwest Coalition in the U.S. House of Representatives, and was a founding member of the Congressional Tourism Caucus.

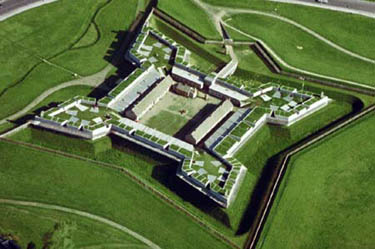
Aerial view of National Monument

=== Griffiss AFB ===
He and a coalition of other House members also started a campaign in the early 1970s to persuade the Defense Department to award more military contracts and employ more people in the Northeast, which was losing Defense funding and contracts to the South. And in 1974, Mitchell led another successful campaign to prevent the Air Force from cutting 1,500 jobs at the Rome Air Development Center at Griffiss Air Force Base in Rome, NY

=== "Save the Theatres" Effort ===
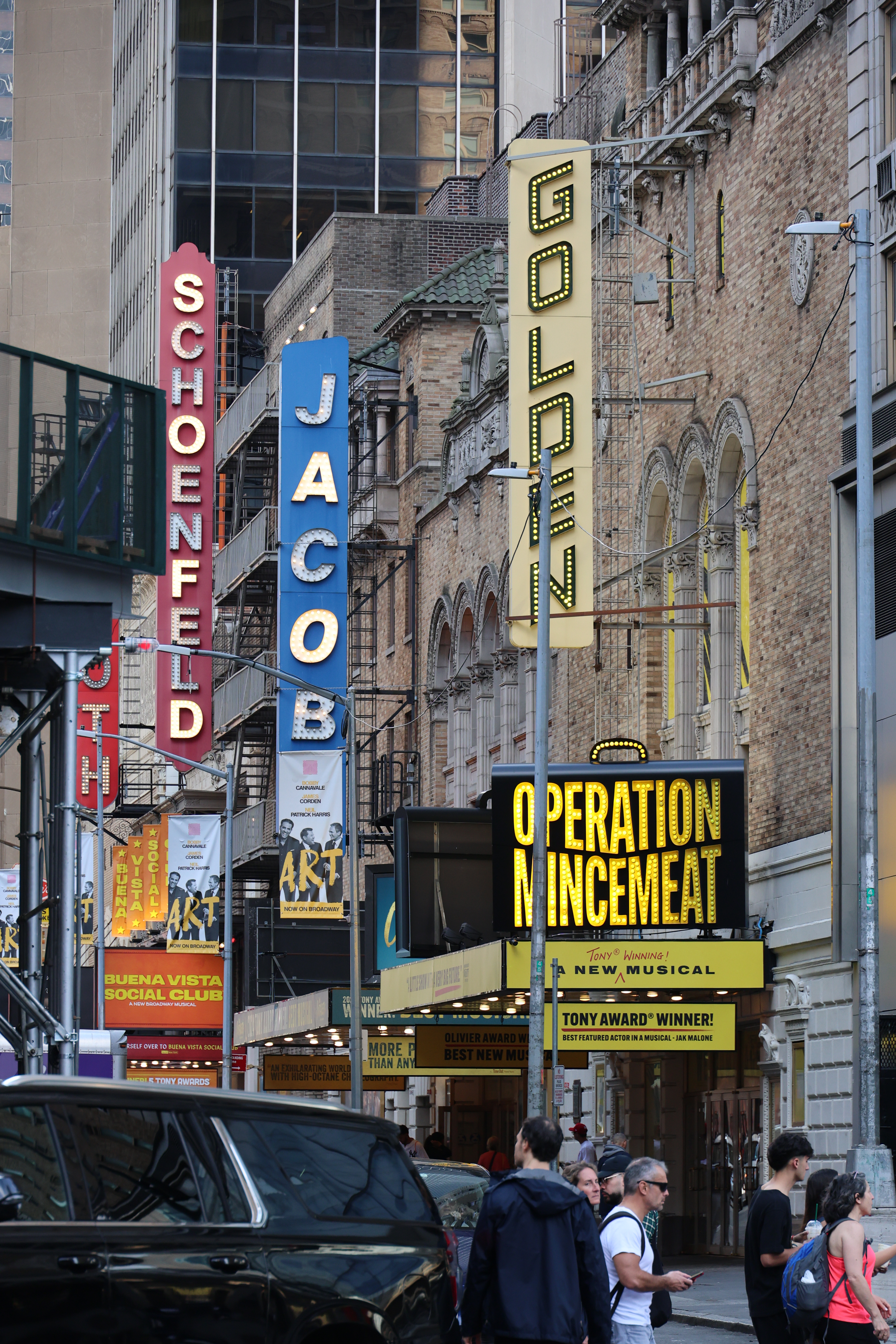
The Golden Theatre, Bernard B. Jacobs Theatre, Gerald Schoenfeld Theatre and Booth Theatre in Manhattan's Theater District, New York City

In 1982, at the behest of Broadway Producer Joe Papp, and with the encouragement of members of his family and others involved in a "Save the Theatres" effort to preserve historic Broadway theatres in New York City, Mitchell introduced legislation in the Congress along with 13 co-sponsors (Note: Co-sponsors of the legislation included: Rep. Michael D. Barnes (MD), Rep. Barber B. Conable, Jr. (NY), Rep. Thomas A. Daschle (SD), Rep. Arlen Erdahl (MN), Rep. David W. Evans (IN), Rep. Hamilton Fish, Jr. (NY), Rep. Thomas M. Foglietta (PA), Rep. Peter A. Peyser (NY), Rep. Peter W. Rodino, Jr. (NJ), Rep. Louis Stokes (OH), Rep. Ted Weiss (NY), Rep. George C. Wortley (NY), and Rep. Ron Wyden (OR).) to designate a "Broadway/Times Square Theatre District National Historic Site" in Mid-Town Manhattan. (Note: The bill as drafted proposed designation of the Theatre District in New York as the "Broadway/Times Square Theatre District National Historic Site." It would have required the United States to provide assistance in the preservation of the historical, cultural, and architectural character of the site and in its restoration, upgrading, and maintenance. It directed the Secretary of the Interior, acting through the National Park Service, to designate theatre preservation sites and other appropriate real property within the site as national historic landmarks if they met the criteria for national historic landmarks, and would have prohibited the demolition or alteration of real property located within the site unless such demolition or alteration would contribute to the preservation, restoration, or enhancement of the site for traditional legitimate theatre purposes. It also would require the National Park Service to provide technical assistance to carry out the Act, and authorized NPS to provide property owners within the site with emergency assistance in preserving or protecting their property. Finally, it would have established a Federally chartered citizens advisory group to be chaired by Papp known as the "Broadway/Times Square Theatre District Preservation Commission" which would provide advice to the Government on actions that could be taken and policies that should be appropriately applied in carrying out the Act.)

Mitchell's bill (97th Congress – H.R.6885) faced fierce opposition and extensive lobbying mounted against it by Mayor Ed Koch's administration and big-money Manhattan development interests. Although the measure was, consequently, never enacted – the overall effect of his legislative initiative and of the "Save the Theatres" effort generally, however, was to slow down the rapid destruction of the old Theater District. This allowed for the preservation of at least some of the historic playhouses, with the eventual designation by the City of an official "Theater Subdistrict", (Note: New York City's Theater District (officially zoned as the "Theater Subdistrict") is an area in Midtown Manhattan where most Broadway theatres are located, as well as many other theaters, movie theaters, restaurants, hotels, and other places of entertainment. It extends from West 40th Street to West 54th Street, from west of Sixth Avenue to east of Eighth Avenue, and includes Times Square.) and helped to ensure retention of a measure of the District's original flavor, atmosphere, charm and historic character for future generations of theatregoers and visitors to the City.

As a result in large part to Papp's efforts, with the support of Congressman Mitchell and many others, the Theater District remains one of New York City's primary and most popular tourist attractions and destinations.

== Life after Congress / Accolades ==
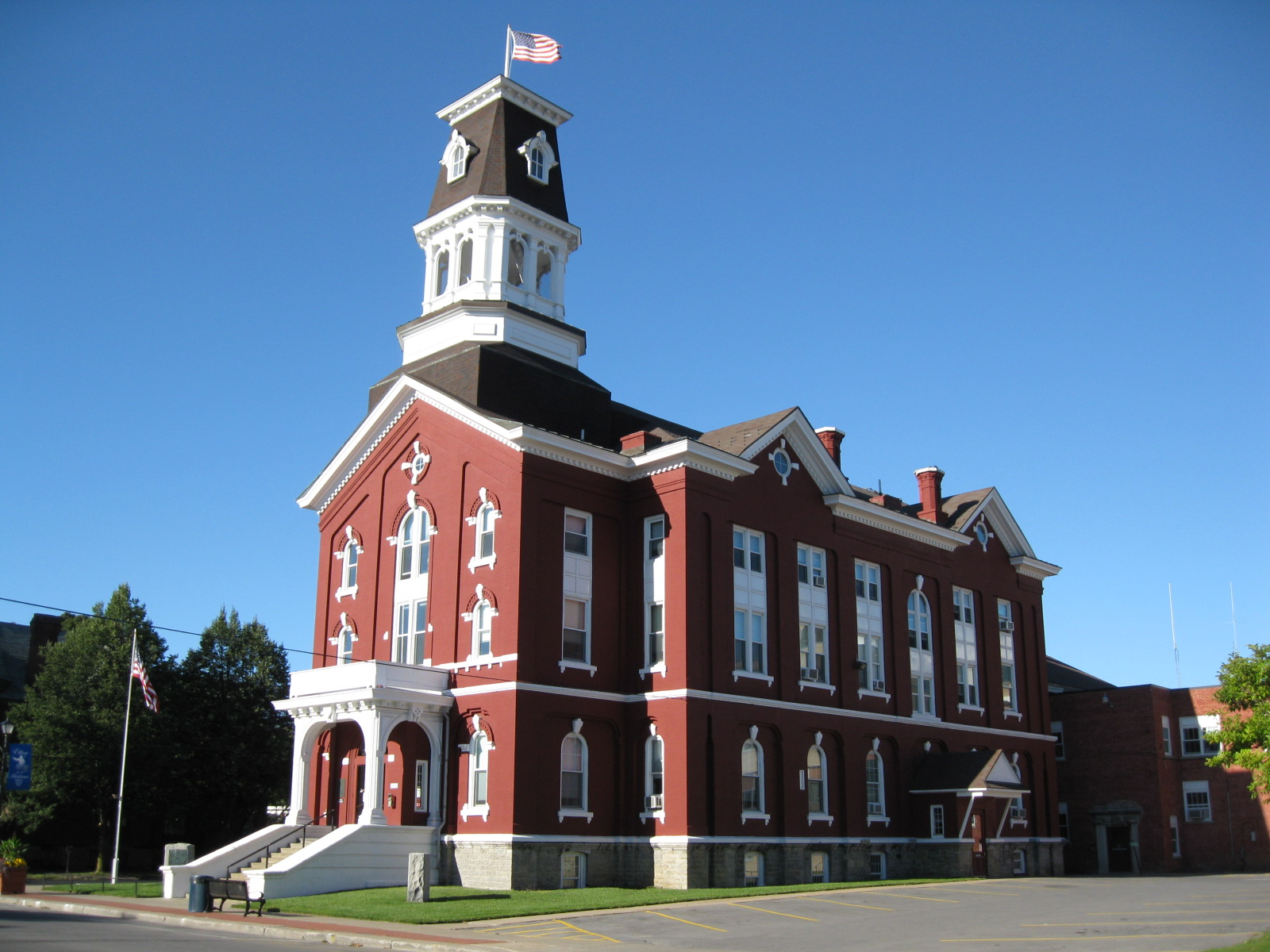
Historic Herkimer County Courthouse Building

In 1984, Mitchell retired from public service and returned to Herkimer, New York. There he resumed his optometry practice, he and his wife Gretta dividing their time between homes in the Mohawk Valley and in Cedar Key, Florida.

=== Tributes and awards ===
The Veterans Administration hospital clinic at Griffiss Air Force Base near Rome, New York was formally designated by Act of Congress, signed into law by President Clinton, to be known as the "Donald J. Mitchell VA Outpatient Clinic". The facility provides primary care and other health care services for veterans in the greater Utica-Rome-Syracuse area in Central New York State.

=== Donald J. Mitchell Scholarship Fund ===
In 1992, Congressman Mitchell and his family established the "Donald J. Mitchell Family Fund", a charitable trust fund administered through the Community Foundation of Herkimer and Oneida Counties based in Utica. The foundation and the Mitchell fund's mission is to build partnerships, inspire leadership and generate positive outcomes toward increasing the percentage of adults with bachelor's degrees in Herkimer and Oneida counties, through annual grants to local students; and to embrace other programs and collaborations that address economic development, education, health, and arts and culture in the region.

=== Death ===
Mitchell died on September 27, 2003, of complications associated with Parkinson's disease. Upon his death, the Utica Observer-Dispatch newspaper noted: "If anyone can be heralded for having led an exemplary life, its former U.S. Congressman Donald J. Mitchell.... Mitchell managed to balance a vigorous commitment to community and country without ever forsaking family and friends – and he left a legacy of pride along a path that took him from the Mohawk Valley to the Nation's Capital and back again."

Escorted by both Active Duty, and American Legion Veterans honor guards – and borne by uniform personnel representing all branches of the U.S. Military – Mitchell was interred with full military honors, accompanied by "Taps" and the firing of volley shots, on a hillside at the Oak Hill Cemetery overlooking a tributary of the Mohawk River in his hometown of Herkimer, New York.

== Notes ==
New York State Assembly
Preceded by Leo A. Lawrence	New York State Assembly; Herkimer County; 1965	Succeeded by district abolished
Preceded by new district	New York State Assembly; 122nd District; 1966	Succeeded by Louis H. Folmer
Preceded by Harvey M. Lifset	New York State Assembly; 112th District; 1967–1972	Succeeded by K. Daniel Haley
U.S. House of Representatives
Preceded by Robert C. McEwen	Member of the U.S. House of Representatives from New York's 31st congressional district 1973–1983	Succeeded by Jack Kemp
