= East Herkimer, New York =

- Census-designated place
- Location within New York Location within the United States
- Coordinates: 43°1′47″N 74°57′51″W
- Country: United States
- State: New York
- County: Herkimer
- Town: Herkimer

Area
  - Total: 1.22 sq mi (3.17 km^{2})
  - Land: 1.19 sq mi (3.09 km^{2})
  - Water: 0.031 sq mi (0.08 km^{2})
- Elevation: 501 ft (153 m)

Population (2020)
  - Total: 787
  - Density: 659.4/sq mi (254.61/km^{2})
- Time zone: UTC-5 (Eastern (EST))
  - Summer (DST): UTC-4 (EDT)
- ZIP Code: 13350 (Herkimer)
- Area codes: 315/680
- FIPS code: 36-22238
- GNIS feature ID: 2806940

East Herkimer is a hamlet and census-designated place (CDP) in the town of Herkimer in Herkimer County, New York, United States. As of the 2020 census, East Herkimer had a population of 787. It was first listed as a CDP prior to the 2020 census.

The community is in south-central Herkimer County, in the southeast part of the town of Herkimer. It is bordered to the west, across West Canada Creek, by the village of Herkimer. The hamlet sits on a bluff overlooking the Mohawk River to the south.

New York State Route 5 runs through the center of the hamlet, leading west into Herkimer village and east 6 miles (10 km) to Little Falls. Herkimer Elementary School and a stadium used by the Herkimer High School Football, Soccer, and Track and Field teams are located in East Herkimer, as is a plant for Utica Alloys. Herkimer-Fulton-Hamilton-Otsego BOCES is also located just outside East Herkimer's limits.

== Demographics ==
Historical population
Census	Pop.	Note	%±
2020	787		—
U.S. Decennial Census
