= Mohawk, Herkimer County, New York =

- Village
- Location within New York Location within the United States
- Coordinates: 43°0′37″N 75°0′18″W
- Country: United States
- State: New York
- County: Herkimer
- Town: German Flatts

Area
  - Total: 0.90 sq mi (2.34 km^{2})
  - Land: 0.88 sq mi (2.27 km^{2})
  - Water: 0.027 sq mi (0.07 km^{2})
- Elevation: 410 ft (125 m)

Population (2020)
  - Total: 2,415
  - Density: 2,752.3/sq mi (1,062.67/km^{2})
- Time zone: UTC-5 (Eastern (EST))
  - Summer (DST): UTC-4 (EDT)
- ZIP code: 13407
- Area code: 315
- FIPS code: 36-47823
- GNIS feature ID: 0957470
- Website: mohawk-ny.org

Mohawk is a village in Herkimer County, New York, United States. The population was 2,731 at the 2010 census. The village was named after the adjacent Mohawk River.

The village is at the northern border of the town of German Flatts and adjacent to the Erie Canal. Mohawk is southeast of Utica.

== History ==
The area was settled by Palatine Germans after 1722. In 1725, the King of Great Britain and Governor Burnet granted Mohawk to the Palatine Germans in what was known as the Burnetsfield Patent.

George Washington was known to stop in Mohawk to have lunch at the Shoemaker Tavern on his way to and from Fort Stanwix in Rome.

Mohawk became known as "Bennetts Corners" after a hotel stand that was located here in 1826. In 1838, the village became known as "Mohawk".

The village was incorporated on April 16, 1844. The first president of the village, Frederick Bellinger, came into office on May 4 of that year.

The first mayor of Mohawk was James V. Casey, who was elected in 1960. The current mayor is Jim Baron.

Mohawk is one of only twelve villages in New York still incorporated under a municipal charter, the other villages having incorporated or re-incorporated under the provisions of Village Law.

The Herkimer County shootings took place partially in Mohawk on March 13, 2013.

== Geography ==
Mohawk is located in the northern part of the town of German Flatts at 43°0′37″N 75°0′18″W (43.010194, -75.005022), on the south side of the Mohawk River. It is bordered to the west by the village of Ilion and to the northeast, across the river, by the village of Herkimer.

According to the United States Census Bureau, Mohawk has a total area of 0.89 square miles (2.3 km^{2}), of which 0.03 square miles (0.07 km^{2}), or 2.94%, are water.

New York State Route 5S, an east-west highway, runs through the northern part of the village, leading east (downriver) 23 miles (37 km) to Fort Plain and west (upriver) 14 miles (23 km) to Utica. New York State Route 28 (Warren Street/Columbia Street) is a north-south highway through the village center, leading northeast 1.5 miles (2.4 km) to Herkimer and south 12 miles (19 km) to Richfield Springs. New York State Route 168 (Hammond Street) has its western terminus in the village and leads southeast 14 miles (23 km) to Starkville.

== Demographics ==
Historical population
Census	Pop.	Note	%±
1870	1,464		—
1880	1,441		−1.6%
1890	1,806		25.3%
1900	2,028		12.3%
1910	2,079		2.5%
1920	2,919		40.4%
1930	2,835		−2.9%
1940	2,882		1.7%
1950	3,196		10.9%
1960	3,533		10.5%
1970	3,301		−6.6%
1980	2,956		−10.5%
1990	2,986		1.0%
2000	2,660		−10.9%
2010	2,731		2.7%
2020	2,415		−11.6%
U.S. Decennial Census

As of the census of 2000, there were 2,660 people, 1,146 households, and 708 families residing in the village. The population density was 3,009.8 inhabitants per square mile (1,162.1/km^{2}). There were 1,233 housing units at an average density of 1,395.1 per square mile (538.7/km^{2}). The racial makeup of the village was 98.42% White, 0.49% African American, 0.15% Native American, 0.15% Asian, 0.23% from other races, and 0.56% from two or more races. Hispanic or Latino of any race were 1.88% of the population.

There were 1,146 households, out of which 27.0% had children under the age of 18 living with them, 47.0% were married couples living together, 10.4% had a female householder with no husband present, and 38.2% were non-families. 30.7% of all households were made up of individuals, and 14.8% had someone living alone who was 65 years of age or older. The average household size was 2.29 and the average family size was 2.86.

In the village, the population was spread out, with 21.7% under the age of 18, 9.4% from 18 to 24, 25.9% from 25 to 44, 24.4% from 45 to 64, and 18.7% who were 65 years of age or older. The median age was 40 years. For every 100 females, there were 92.9 males. For every 100 females age 18 and over, there were 85.9 males.

The median income for a household in the village was $32,439, and the median income for a family was $39,185. Males had a median income of $29,915 versus $20,918 for females. The per capita income for the village was $16,469. About 5.5% of families and 8.5% of the population were below the poverty line, including 5.0% of those under age 18 and 6.1% of those age 65 or over.

== Education ==
Mohawk students get their education from the Central Valley Central School District, a merger between the Ilion and Mohawk Central School Districts that took effect early in 2013. The sports teams of Central Valley call themselves the Thunder, and their school colors are light blue, navy, yellow and white. Prior to this, Mohawk had called their teams the "Mohicans" after the Mohawk Nation who occupied the Mohawk Valley before European settlement. Their school colors were orange, black, and white. The last graduating class of Mohawk Central School District was in 2013 and consisted of 54 students.

Under the merger, both schools in the former Mohawk district were retained: Harry M. Fisher Elementary School, which now serves the combined district's Pre-K, kindergarten and first grade students, and Gregory B. Jarvis High School, which is now Central Valley's middle school.

== Media ==
One radio station is licensed to Mohawk: WHMV-LP (97.5 FM), which also serves the neighboring villages of Ilion and Herkimer. Mohawk is also served by television stations in the nearby Utica NY region "WKTV" and by the Observer-Dispatch, a newspaper based in Utica and the Times Telegram, a newspaper based in Herkimer.

== Notable people ==
- Gregory Jarvis, engineer who died during the destruction of the Space Shuttle Challenger on mission STS-51-L, where he was serving as Payload Specialist. The local middle school, Gregory B. Jarvis Middle School, is named after him.
- Carl Edgar Myers, balloon inventor and aeronautical engineer scientist
- Mary Myers, the first female to solo fly a lighter-than-air passenger balloon
- Leigh and Leslie Keno, antique appraisers, longtime contributors to Antiques Roadshow.
- Francis E. Spinner, Treasurer of the United States during and after the Civil War; celebrated for his distinctive signature and for being the first federal official to employ women.
- Robert E. Fistick, Noted national journalist and newspaper publisher with the Gannett, Hearst, and Whitney publishing organizations, and later a deputy director at The Library of Congress.
