= Rice–Dodge–Burgess Farm =

- U.S. National Register of Historic Places
- Location within New York Location within the United States
- Location: 588 NY 51, Cedarville, New York
- Coordinates: 42°54′47″N 75°07′11″W
- Area: 57.02 acres (23.08 ha)
- Built: c. 1830, 1835, 1889
- NRHP reference No.: 15000821
- Added to NRHP: November 24, 2015

Rice-Dodge-Burgess Farm, also known as the Stone House at Chepachet Pond, is a historic home and farm complex located at Cedarville in Herkimer County, New York. The farm was established in the 1820s, and includes a gable-roofed stone house (1830); a timber-framed barn (early-mid 19th century); stone smokehouse (early-mid 19th century); small family cemetery (late 19th or early 20th century); stone dam, mill pond, and mill ruins (between 1815 and 1830); and farm fields. The stone house is a 1 ½ story, rectangular-plan limestone dwelling with a wood-framed screen porch (c. 1925).

It was listed on the National Register of Historic Places in 2015.
