= United States Post Office (Herkimer, New York) =

- US Post Office-Herkimer
- U.S. National Register of Historic Places
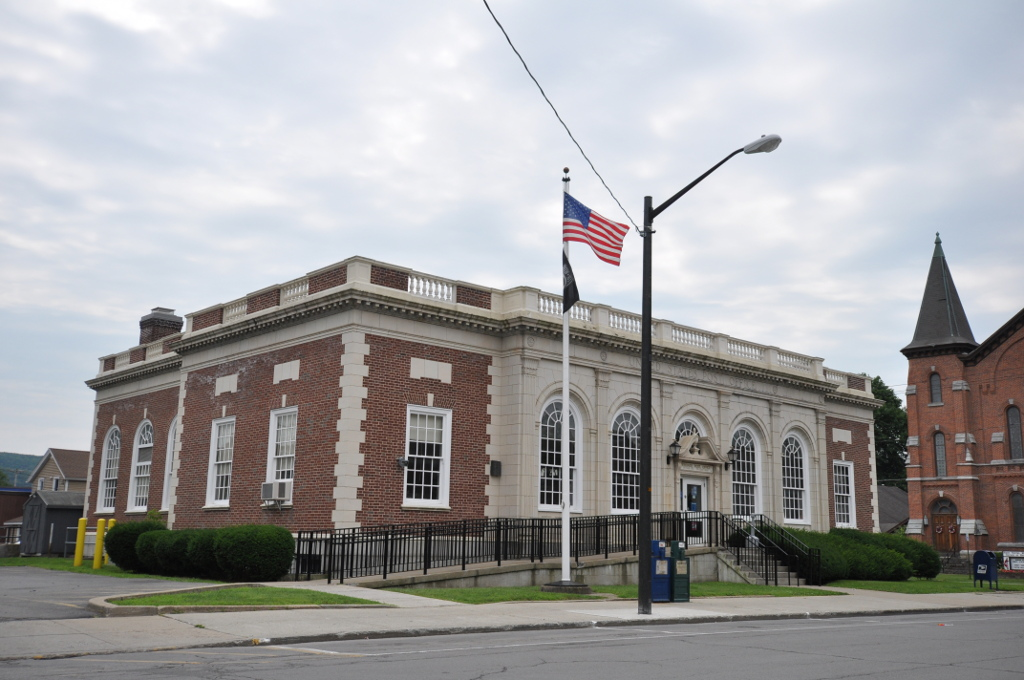

- Location within New York Location within the United States
- Location: 135 Park Ave., Herkimer, New York
- Coordinates: 43°1′33″N 74°59′18″W
- Area: less than one acre
- Built: 1933
- Architect: US Treasury Dept.; Sluyter, Ross Edgar
- Architectural style: Colonial Revival
- MPS: US Post Offices in New York State, 1858-1943, TR
- NRHP reference No.: 88002501
- Added to NRHP: May 11, 1989

US Post Office-Herkimer is a historic post office building located at Herkimer in Herkimer County, New York, United States. It was designed and built in 1933–1934 by consulting architect Ross Edgar Sluyter for the Office of the Supervising Architect of the Treasury Department. It is a one-story, seven bay building faced with red brick laid in Flemish bond above a granite clad foundation in the Colonial Revival style. The five central bays are formed as a central pavilion and faced in terra cotta marked by Corinthian order pilasters.

It was listed on the National Register of Historic Places in 1989.
