= K. Daniel Haley =

American politician

Member of the New York State Assembly from the 112th district
- In office January 1, 1973 – December 31, 1976
- Preceded by: Donald J. Mitchell
- Succeeded by: David O'Brien Martin

Member of the New York State Assembly from the 110th district
- In office January 1, 1971 – December 31, 1972
- Preceded by: Edward J. Keenan
- Succeeded by: Gerald Solomon

Personal details
- Born: May 25, 1929 Ogdensburg, New York, U.S.
- Died: February 8, 2013 (aged 83) Massena, New York, U.S.
- Party: Democratic
- Education: Harvard College (BA)

K. Daniel Haley (May 25, 1929 – February 8, 2013) was an American politician who served in the New York State Assembly from 1971 to 1976.

He died on February 8, 2013, in Massena, New York at age 83.
