= Palatine German Frame House =

Historic house in New York, United States

- U.S. National Register of Historic Places
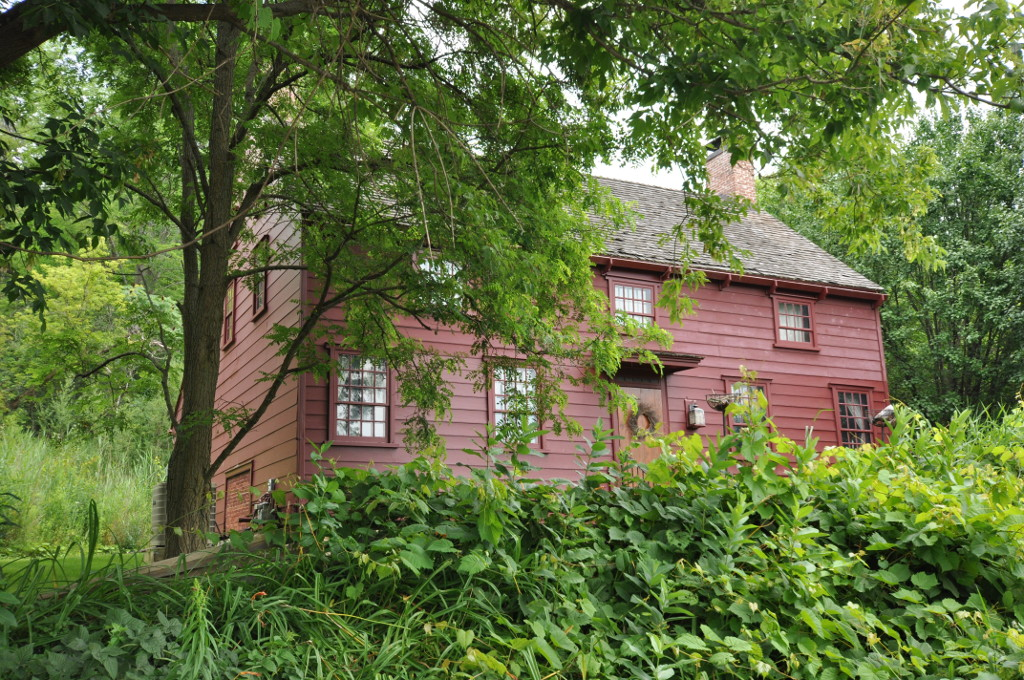

- Location within New York Location within the United States
- Nearest city: Herkimer, New York
- Coordinates: 43°1′42″N 75°2′35″W
- Area: 1.8 acres (0.73 ha)
- Built: 1760
- Architectural style: Colonial
- NRHP reference No.: 04000282
- Added to NRHP: April 15, 2004

Palatine German Frame House is a historic home located at Herkimer in Herkimer County, New York. It is a 1 1/2-story, rectangular, gable-roofed, heavy timber-frame building, five bays wide and two bays deep. It measures approximately 39 feet by 23 feet. It was built after the middle of the 18th century.

It was listed on the National Register of Historic Places in 2004.
