= The Reformed Church =

Historic church in New York, United States

- U.S. National Register of Historic Places
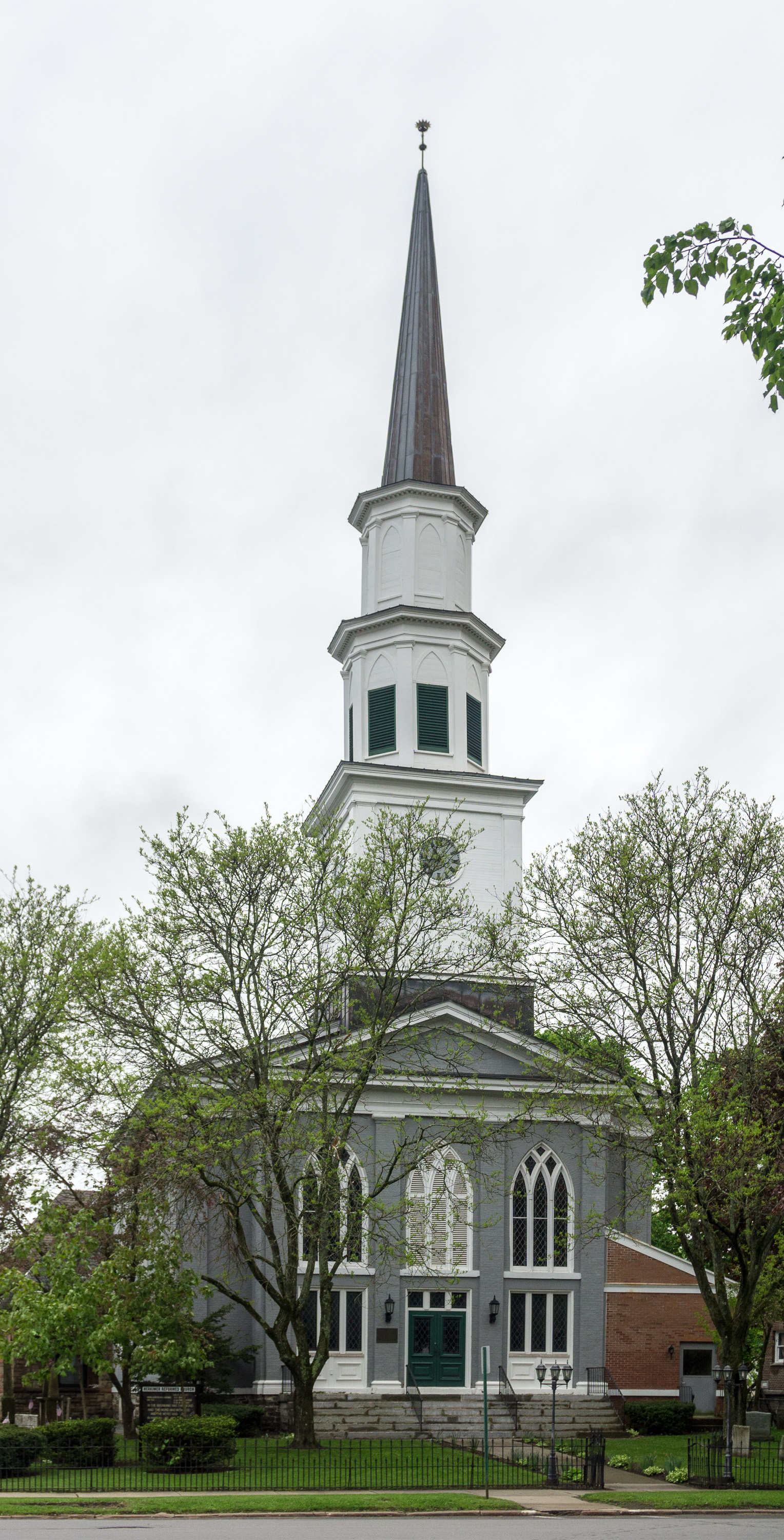
- The Reformed Church in 2018

- Location within New York Location within the United States
- Location: 405 N. Main St., Herkimer, New York
- Coordinates: 43°1′44″N 74°59′25″W
- Area: 0 acres (0 ha)
- Built: 1835
- Architect: Russell, Archimedes
- Architectural style: Federal
- NRHP reference No.: 72000847
- Added to NRHP: March 16, 1972

The Reformed Church is a historic Reformed church at 405 N. Main Street in Herkimer, Herkimer County, New York. It was built in 1835 and is a two-story, painted brick structure with a stone rear wing. It features a staged spire in the Federal style, with a clock in the base of the spire.

It was listed on the National Register of Historic Places in 1972.
