= Herkimer County Jail =

- U.S. National Register of Historic Places
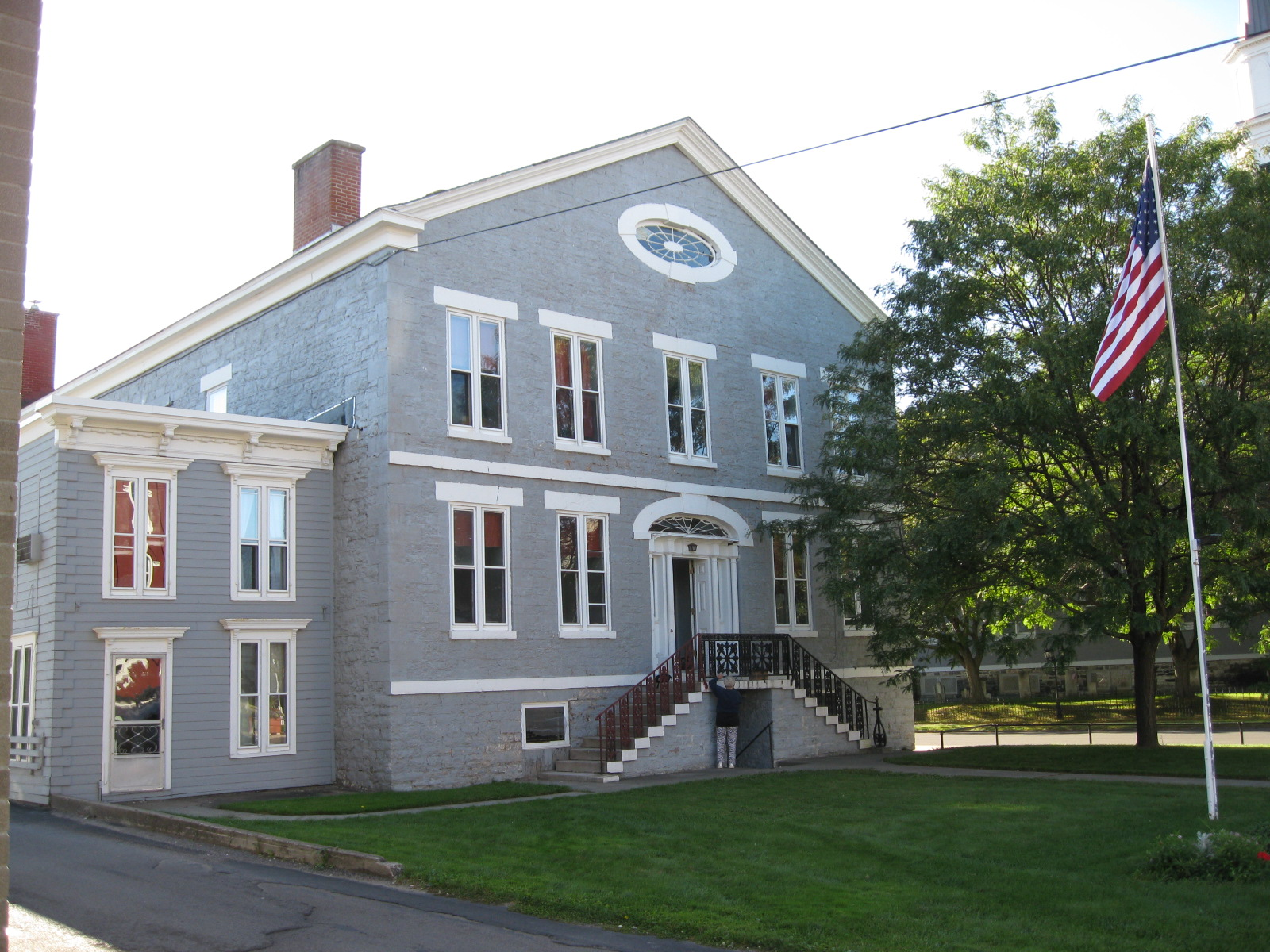
- Herkimer County Jail, September 2009

- Location within New York Location within the United States
- Interactive map showing the location of Herkimer County Jail
- Location: 327 N. Main St., Herkimer, New York
- Coordinates: 43°1′42″N 74°59′24″W
- Area: less than one acre
- Built: 1835
- Architect: Easterbrook, Martin
- Architectural style: Federal
- NRHP reference No.: 72000846
- Added to NRHP: January 14, 1972

Herkimer County Jail, also known as the 1834 Jail, is a historic jail in Herkimer, Herkimer County, New York. It is a two-story structure with high basement, five bays wide, of ashlar limestone blocks with dressed quoins built in 1835. It features a gable roof with oval window and narrow cornice and a Federal style entrance. Tours are regularly given by the Herkimer County Historical Society and a museum display highlights the cases of Chester Gillette (the "American Tragedy") and Roxalana Druse.

It was listed on the National Register of Historic Places in 1972.

== Gallery ==
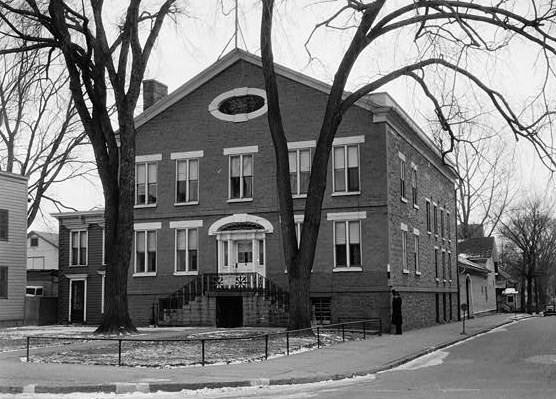
Herkimer Jail, Herkimer (Herkimer County, New York), 1937

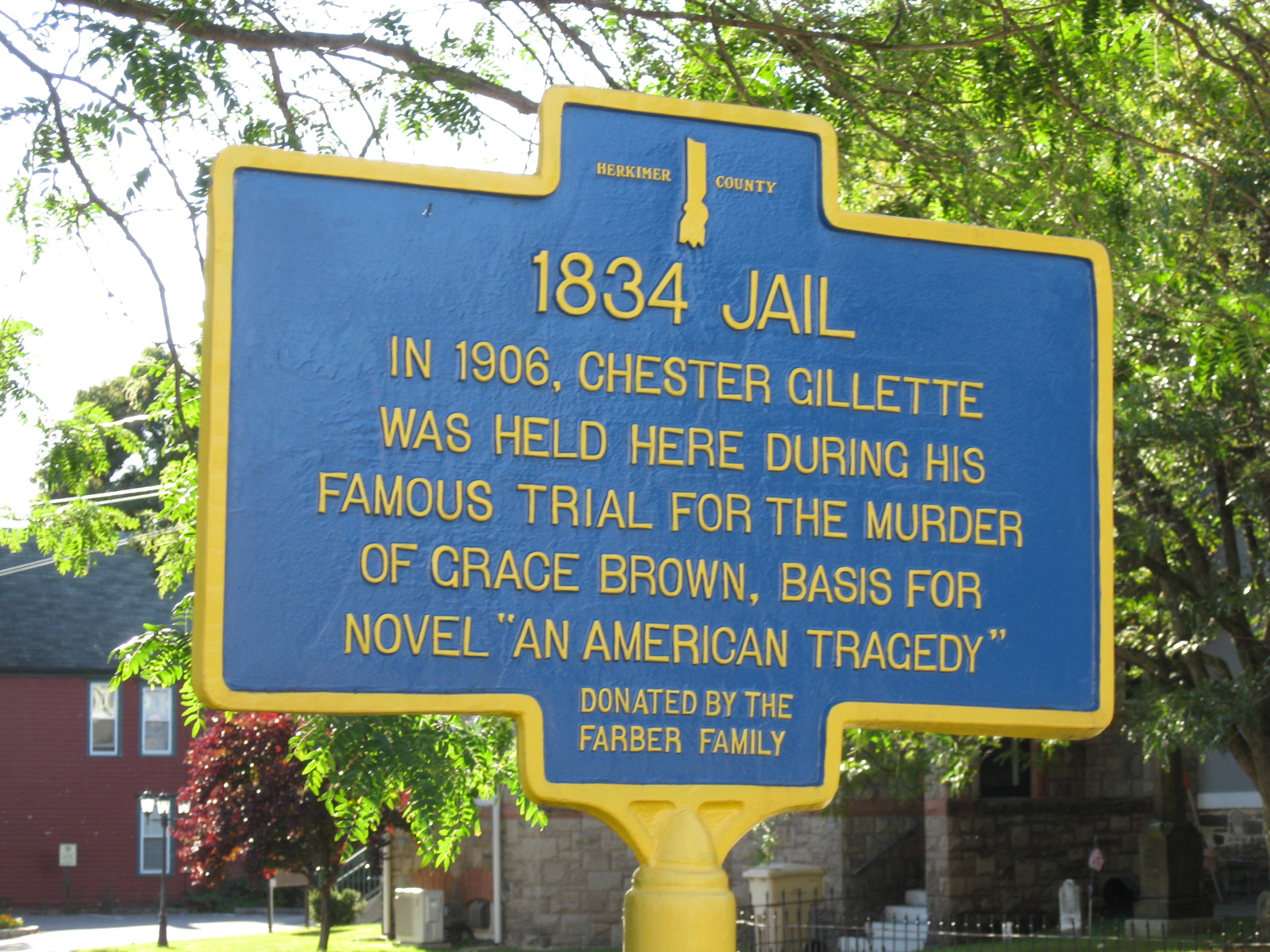
Herkimer County Jail, Historic Marker, September 2009
