= Herkimer County shootings =

2013 spree shooting in New York, U.S.

- Location: Mohawk and Herkimer, New York, United States
- Date: March 13, 2013 (UTC-04)
- Attack type: Spree shooting, mass murder, mass shooting
- Weapon: Mossberg 590 12-gauge pump-action shotgun
- Deaths: 5 (including the perpetrator)
- Injuries: 2
- Perpetrator: Kurt Myers
- Motive: Unknown

The Herkimer County shootings were a shooting spree that took place on March 13, 2013, in Herkimer County, New York, United States.

== Incident ==
Kurt Myers, a 64-year-old resident of the village of Mohawk, set fire to his apartment before 9:30 a.m. and proceeded to a barber shop in Mohawk. Myers briefly spoke to the barbershop owner John Seymour before opening fire, killing two customers and injuring Seymour and another customer. He proceeded to a car wash in the nearby village of Herkimer, where he killed an employee and a customer.

Myers was pursued by police and eventually cornered in an abandoned bar in Herkimer. The standoff lasted overnight. Police entered the building around 8 a.m. the next day. Myers shot and killed a police dog named "Ape" and the police returned fire, killing him.

The autopsy said that the assailant died from internal bleeding after he was shot multiple times in the heart, aorta, liver, lungs, and right kidney.

== Aftermath ==
At the time of the shooting, Myers had no savings, no job, and was maxed out on all his credit cards. He also had very few items of furniture in his apartment. Although authorities found evidence of an affair which Myers had with a married woman for two decades which was ultimately ended by the woman, police ultimately concluded that Myers' actions were motivated by his financial problems.

Myers had no previous criminal record aside from a 1973 arrest for drunken driving. Neighbors said he never had visitors or friends: the few who were familiar described him as an "odd little man" who rarely spoke.

The shootings occurred a few months after the signing of the New York Secure Ammunition and Firearms Enforcement Act of 2013, or NY SAFE Act. The act was discussed in the light of these shootings, and vice versa.

The building where the stand-off took place was demolished in 2015 after a series of minor collapses.
