= Herkimer County Courthouse =

- U.S. National Register of Historic Places
- New York State Register of Historic Places
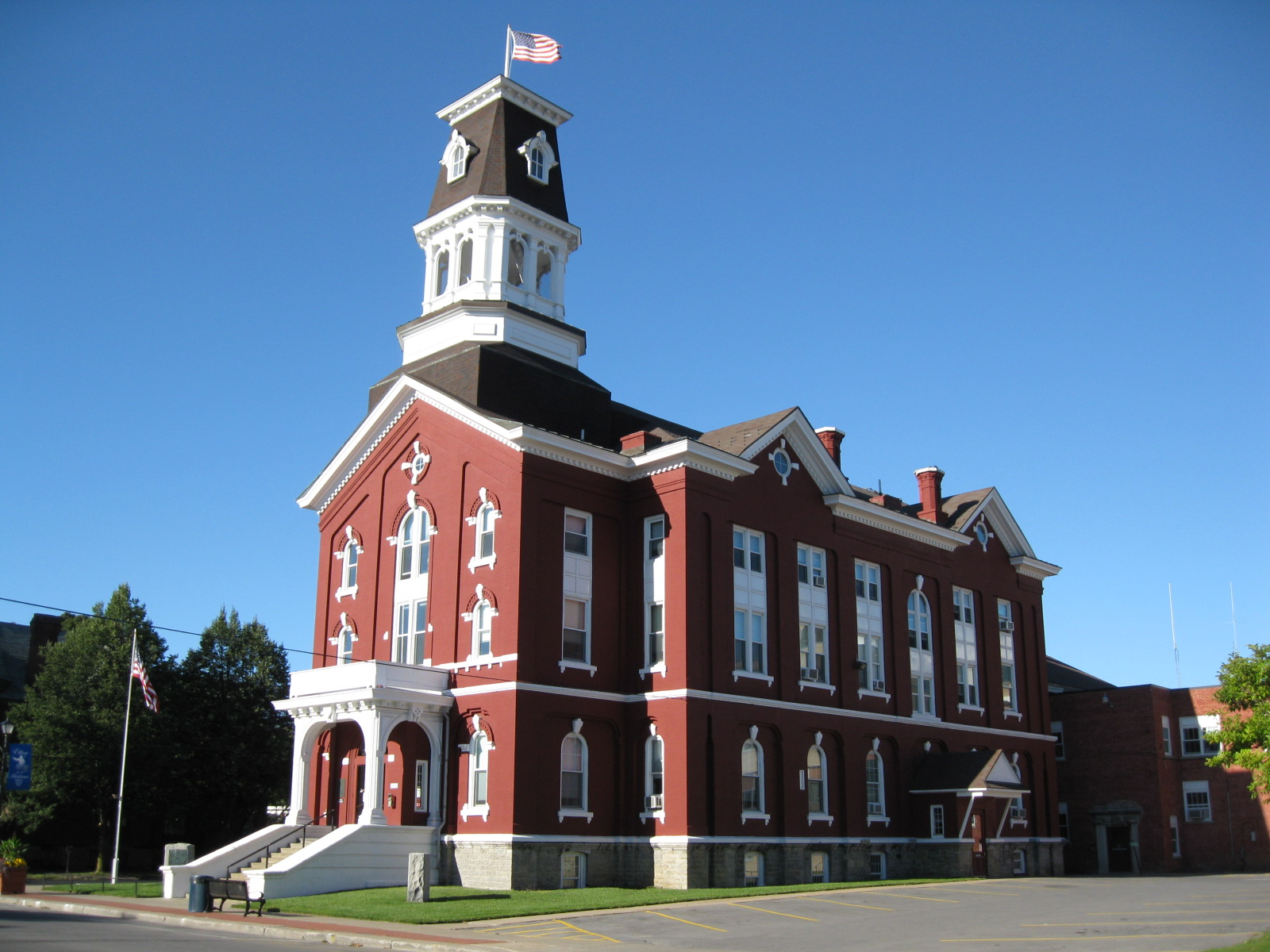
- Herkimer County Courthouse, September 2009

- Location within New York Location within the United States
- Interactive map showing the location of Herkimer County Courthouse
- Location: 320 N. Main St., Herkimer, New York
- Coordinates: 43°1′44″N 74°59′22″W
- Area: less than one acre
- Built: 1873
- NRHP reference No.: 72000844
- NYSRHP No.: 04341.000003

Significant dates
- Added to NRHP: January 14, 1972
- Designated NYSRHP: June 23, 1980

Herkimer County Courthouse is a historic courthouse building in Herkimer, Herkimer County, New York. It is a three-story, wood-frame structure with painted brick walls built in 1873. It features an octagonal tower with arched openings and a mansard roof. It was the site of the 1906 trial of Chester Gillette.

It was listed on the National Register of Historic Places in 1972.
