= Herkimer (village), New York =

Village in Herkimer County, New York, US

Herkimer, New York
- Village
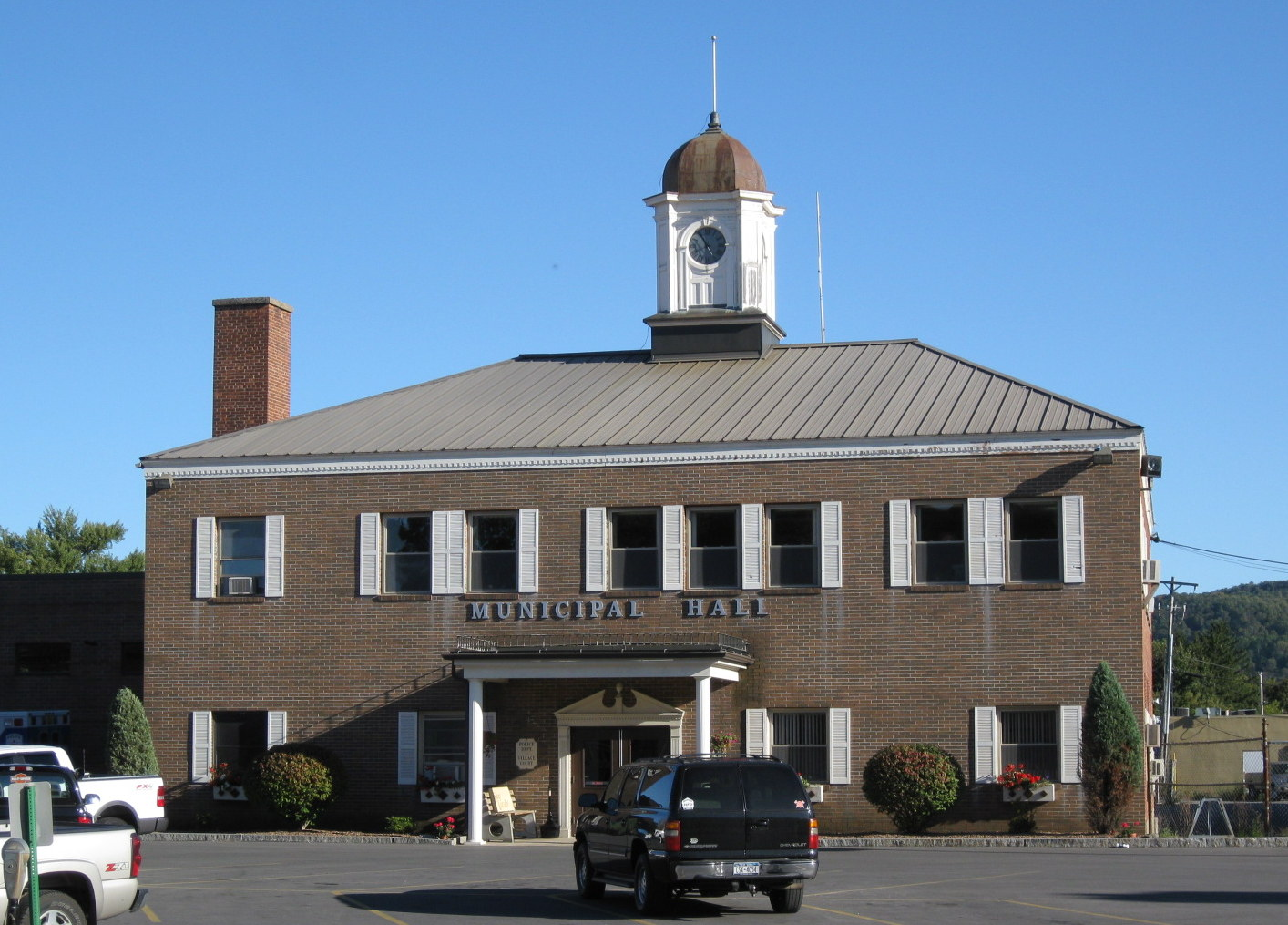
- Herkimer Municipal Hall, September 2009

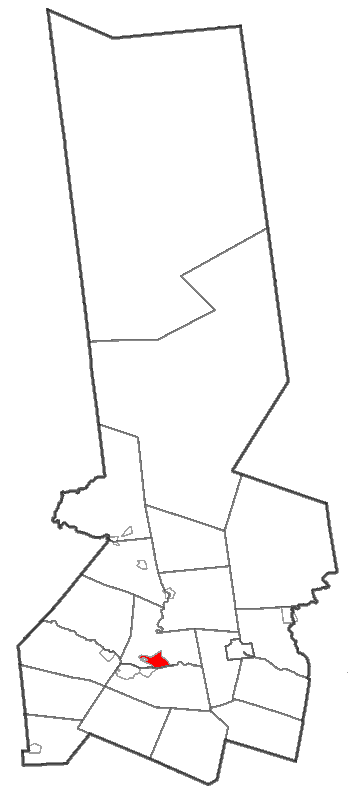
- Location within Herkimer County

- Location within New York Location within the United States
- Coordinates: 43°1′34″N 74°59′25″W
- Country: United States
- State: New York
- County: Herkimer
- Town: Herkimer

Government
  - Mayor: Michael Jory, (R)

Area
  - Total: 2.70 sq mi (7.00 km^{2})
  - Land: 2.59 sq mi (6.70 km^{2})
  - Water: 0.12 sq mi (0.30 km^{2})
- Elevation: 384 ft (117 m)

Population (2020)
  - Total: 7,234
  - Density: 2,794.8/sq mi (1,079.07/km^{2})
- Time zone: UTC-5 (Eastern (EST))
  - Summer (DST): UTC-4 (EDT)
- ZIP code: 13350
- Area code: 315
- FIPS code: 36-34121
- GNIS feature ID: 0952621
- Website: village.herkimer.ny.us

Herkimer is a village located in the Town Of Herkimer (population 9,566) on the north side of the Mohawk River and the county seat of Herkimer County, New York, United States, about 15 miles (24 km) southeast of Utica. As of the 2020 Census, it had a population of 7,234, and a predicted population of 7,283 on July 1, 2022. It was part of the Burnetsfield Patent and the first colonial settlement this far west in the Mohawk Valley.

The village takes its name from the Herkimer family, Palatine German immigrants who settled in the area in 1723. The most notable family member was Nicholas Herkimer, a general of the Tryon County militia, who died from wounds received at the Battle of Oriskany in the American Revolutionary War.

The village is located within the town of Herkimer and Herkimer County; together, they are referred to as "the Herkimers". The citizens of the village are served by three levels of government of the same name - the village, the town, and the county of Herkimer. (Only the residents of the village of Madison and New York County, also in New York, share a similar distinction.)

Herkimer County Community College, located in the northwest part of the village, was founded in 1966 by the Herkimer County Board of Supervisors.

== History ==
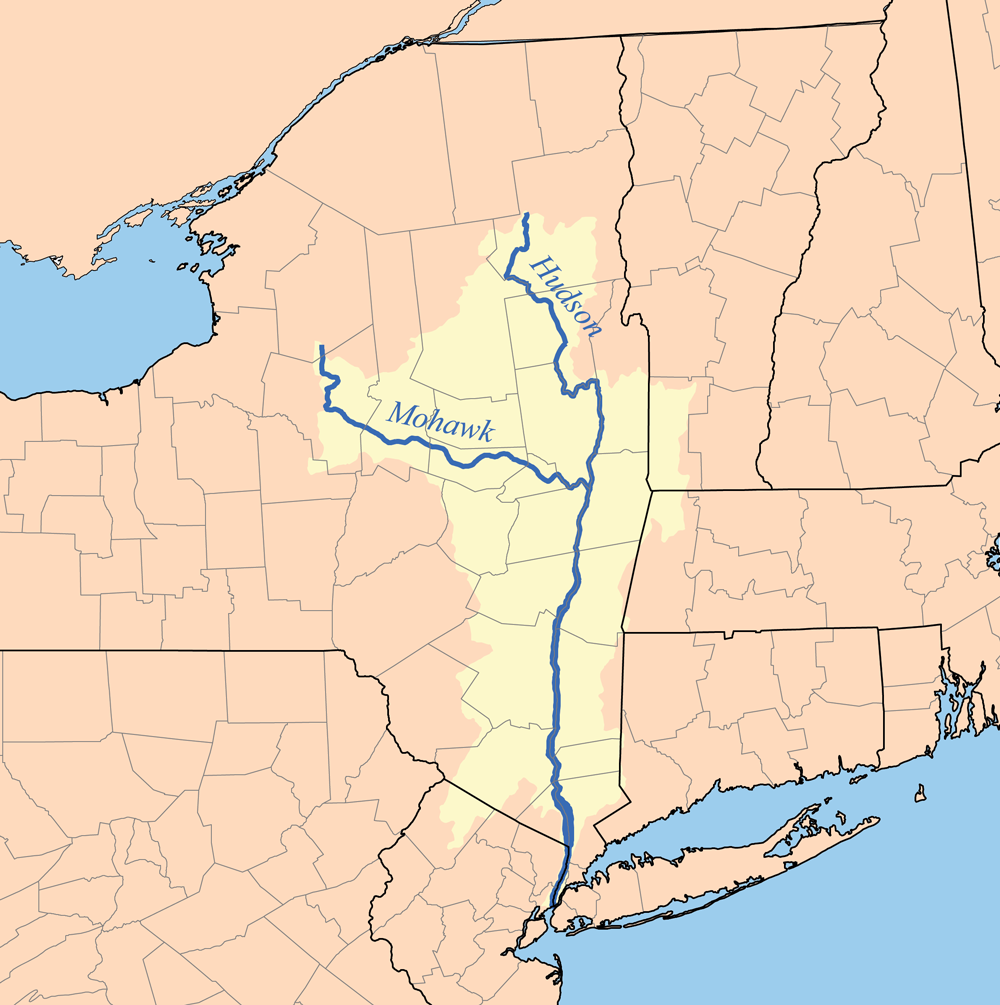
Hudson River watershed map showing the Mohawk River

=== Colonial era ===
The region had been part of the territory of the Iroquois Mohawk Native American people for centuries. Their villages were linked by winding paths through the wilderness and along the Mohawk River. By the early 18th century, they had two main villages in the Mohawk River Valley, Teantontalago to the east, known by the English as the Lower Mohawk Castle, and Canajoharie to the west, known as the Upper Mohawk Castle. The English built Fort Hunter near the Lower Mohawk Castle.

Palatine Germans first arrived in New York in August 1708, with most arriving in the summer of 1710. Refugees from religious wars in Europe, they had agreed to exchange work for passage to the New York Colony. This was arranged by Queen Anne's government, and in 1710, nearly 2,800 Germans arrived in 10 ships at present-day Manhattan. They were at first quarantined on Nutten Island (now known as Governors Island) until the ship fevers ran their course. In exchange, they worked for some time in camps along the Hudson River to manufacture British naval supplies. As early as 1712, some went on upriver to settle along Schoharie Creek in the Mohawk Valley.

In 1722, in response to a request by the German Palatine leaders Joseph Petrie and Conrad Rickert, Governor William Burnet granted the Palatines a lease to purchase land from the Mohawk Nation in the vicinity of the confluence of West Canada Creek and the Mohawk River. After a survey of the land was completed in 1723, many more settlers arrived in the area between 1723 and 1725. They settled on both the north and south sides of the Mohawk River. The area was originally known as "Burnetsfield", named in honor of the governor. The Burnetsfield Patent, granted April 13, 1725, assigned 100-acre (0.40 km^{2}) lots to about 90 heads of family. The area was also referred to at times as "Stone Ridge", "The Flats", "The Falls", and most commonly, due to the mostly German immigrant population and the flat floodplain topography, as German Flatts. This was the first colonial settlement this far west in the Mohawk Valley.

Shortly after 1722, a blockhouse and a church were erected in the village on the north side of the river. This site was later developed as the present Reformed Church. The first known minister was the Reverend George Michael Weiss, who served from 1735 to 1742. A schoolhouse was erected in 1745. Weiss was followed in 1751 by the Elder Rosencrantz, who was succeeded by his son, the Reverend Abraham Rosencrantz, the latter serving until his death in 1796.

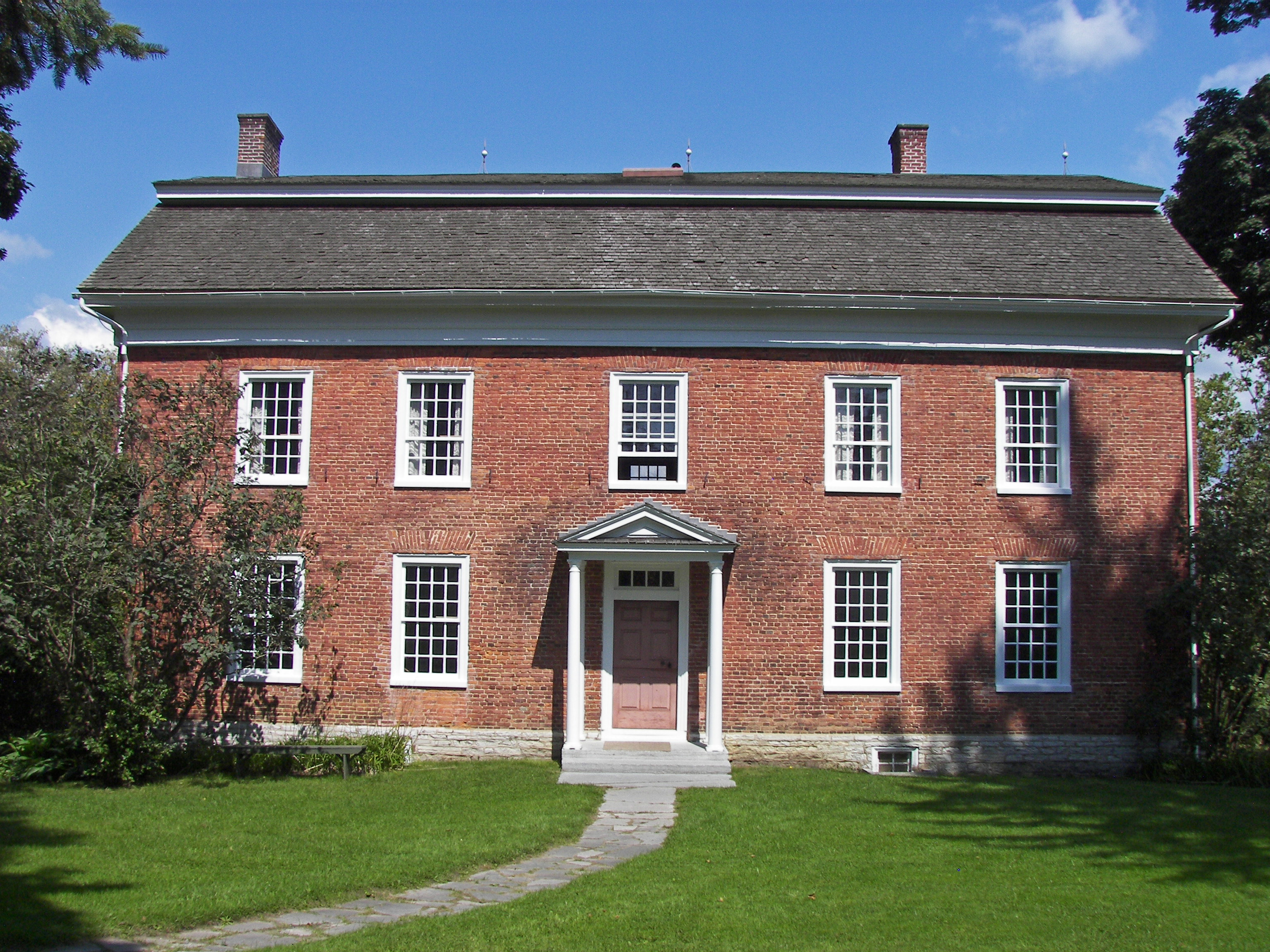
Nicholas Herkimer Home near Herkimer (2009)

During the French and Indian War, the town was twice attacked by the French and their native American allies, in November 1757 (cf. Attack on German Flatts (1757)) and again in April 1758, when the settlement on the south side of the river and Fort Herkimer were attacked, and about 30 settlers were killed. Captain Nicholas Herkimer held the command of the fort, assembling all of the settlers he could within it.

During the Revolutionary War, the town was attacked multiple times by Loyalists and Iroquois allies, as were other German settlements in the valley. One of these raids was by Butler's Rangers in September 1778. (See Attack on German Flatts (1778).) The village was defended by Fort Dayton.

Fort Herkimer and the settlement on the south side of the river were also attacked. George, Catherine, and Nicholas Demuth were among children captured by the Onondaga during a raid in 1779, while they were playing outside the fort. After the war, during prisoner exchange, George and Catherine returned to the Demuth family. Nicholas, the youngest, had been adopted by an Onondaga chief and become assimilated. He chose to stay with the tribe for the rest of his life. Although he maintained contact with his birth family, he accompanied the Onondaga and lived with them on a reservation outside Syracuse. He married into the tribe and worked as an interpreter and negotiator.

The village of Herkimer was attacked for the last time during the war on July 15, 1782, by about 500 Tories and Iroquois. Two residents were killed, Johann Christian Schell and his son, Denis Augustinius Schell. The rest managed to reach the safety of the fort. About 50 horses were taken and 15 were killed, 180 cattle were taken and 13 killed, and 13 houses and two barns were burned.

=== Village of Herkimer ===
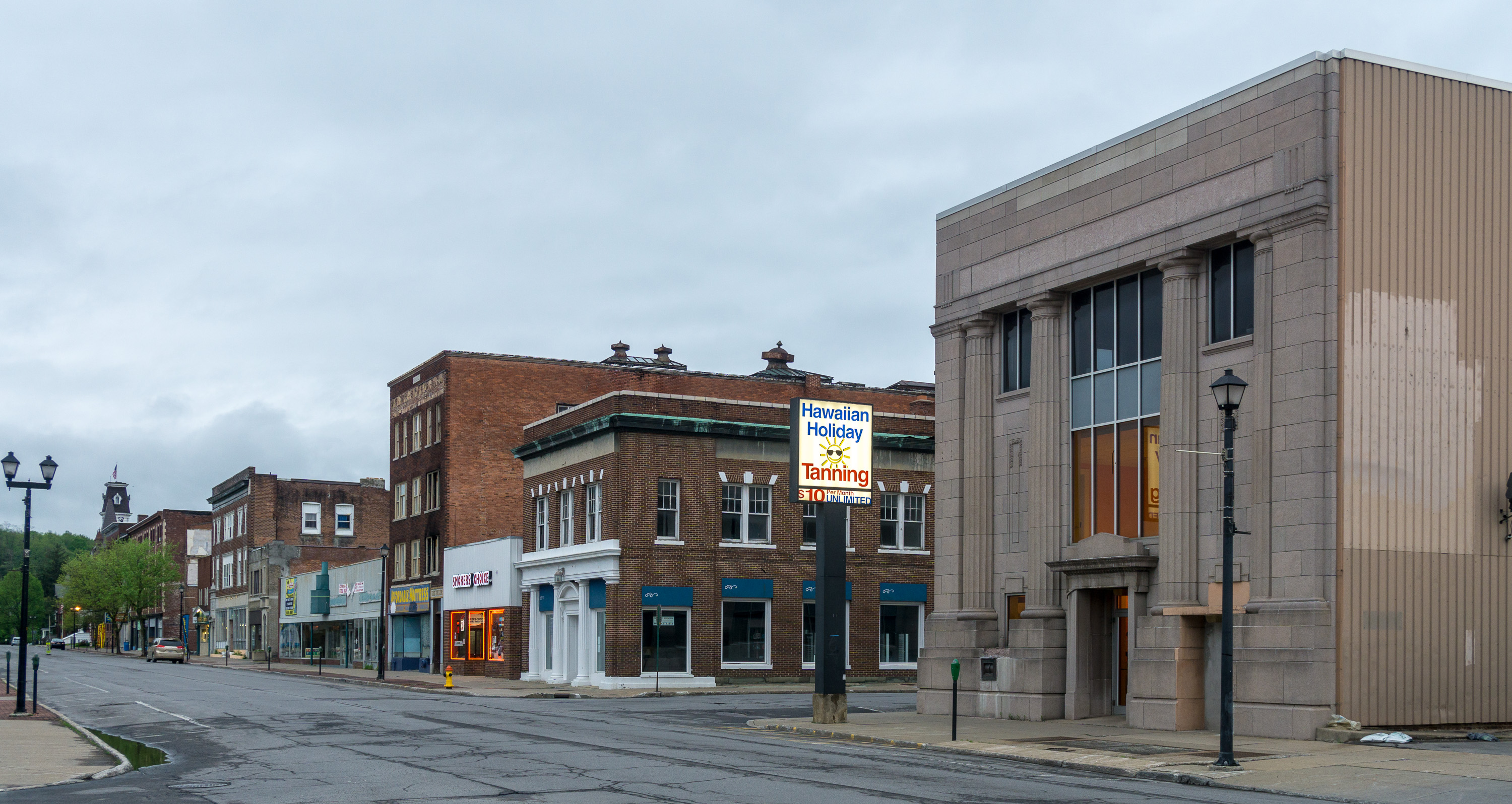
Main Street

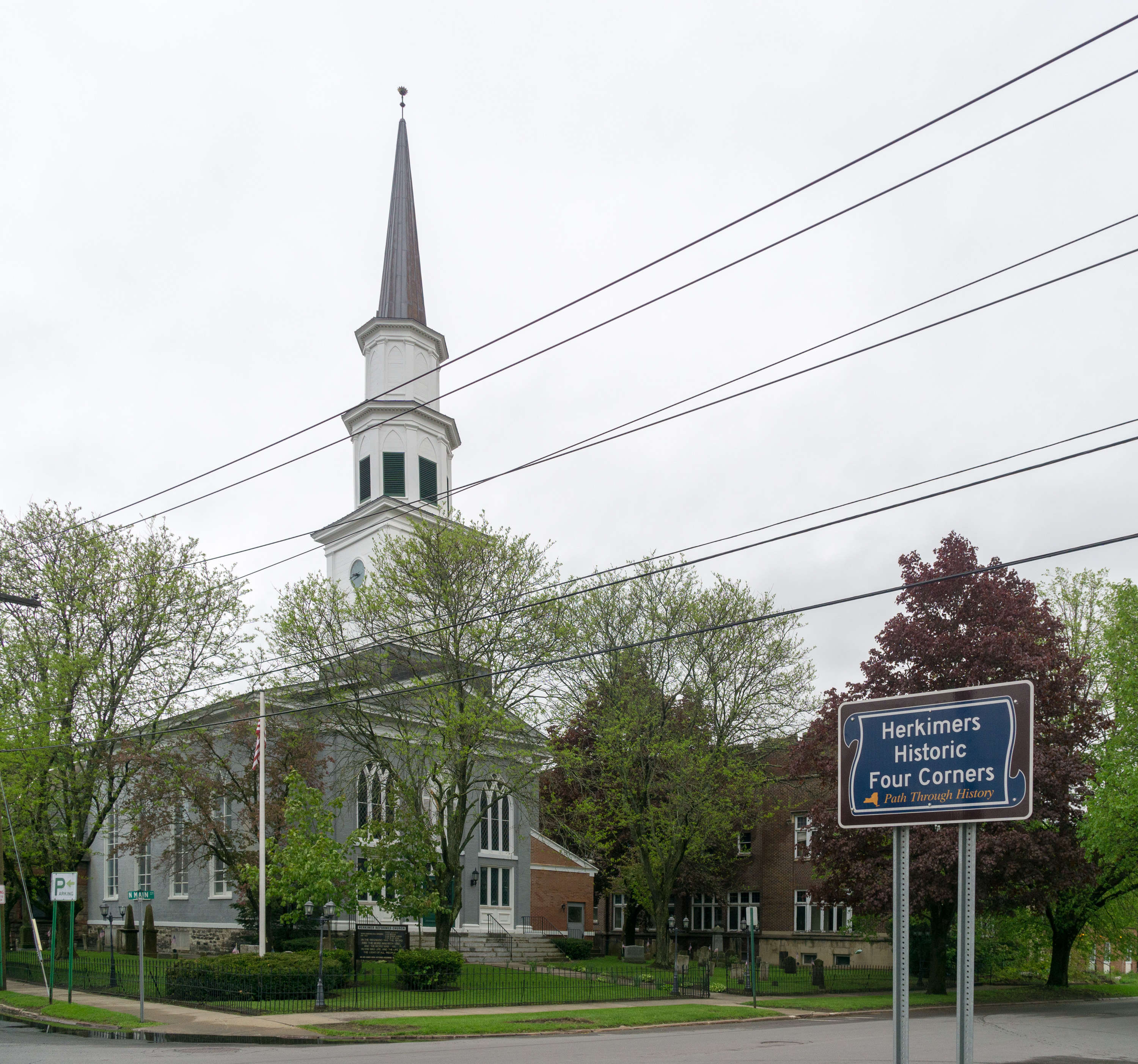
Reformed Church and Historic Four Corners sign at North Main Street and Church Street

In 1788, the township of Herkimer was organized, and the town had come to be known generally as the "Village of Herkimer". In 1791, when Herkimer County was organized, the village of Herkimer was established as the county seat. By 1797, the village had a courthouse, a jail, and a Reformed Dutch Church, with about 40 houses and a population around 250. The village was incorporated in 1807. Its charter was amended in 1832 to enlarge the village. In 1875, the village dispensed with its special charter and organized the village under the state law of the time.

In the early 19th century, Herkimer boasted of several whiskey distilleries and an ashery for the making of potash. By the mid- to late 19th century, the village was served by the New York Central & Hudson River Railroad, a branch of which (the Mohawk and Malone Railway) extended north through the Adirondacks to Malone. An inter-urban electric trolley traveled on railways among villages and Little Falls, Syracuse, Richfield Springs, Cooperstown, and Oneonta. The Erie Canal, built from 1817 to 1825, also served villages and towns in the valley, carrying increased traffic and trade between the Great Lakes and the Hudson River and port of New York.

Herkimer native Francis E. Spinner was treasurer of the United States during the Lincoln administration. Myers Park now contains a statue of him.

By the late 19th century, the village had a public library. The Folts Mission Institute opened in 1893 as a training school for young women under the auspices of the Women's Foreign Missionary Society of the Methodist Episcopal Church. In 1907, a monument was erected by the village to honor General Herkimer.

The Herkimer County shootings took place partially in Herkimer on March 13, 2013.

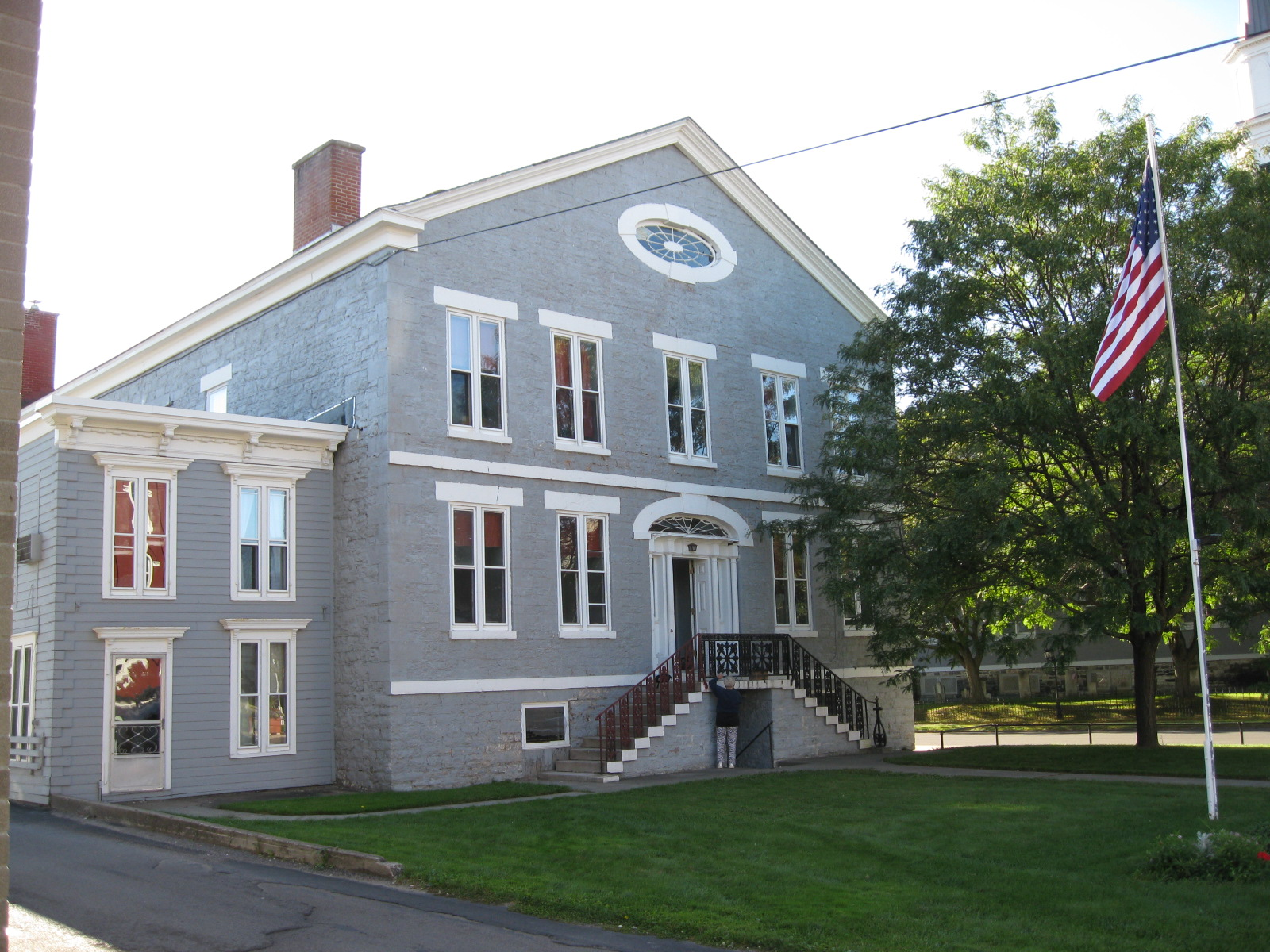
The historic Herkimer County Jail, where Chester Gillette was held during his 1908 trial for the murder of Grace Brown (2009 photo). The case inspired Theodore Dreiser's An American Tragedy.

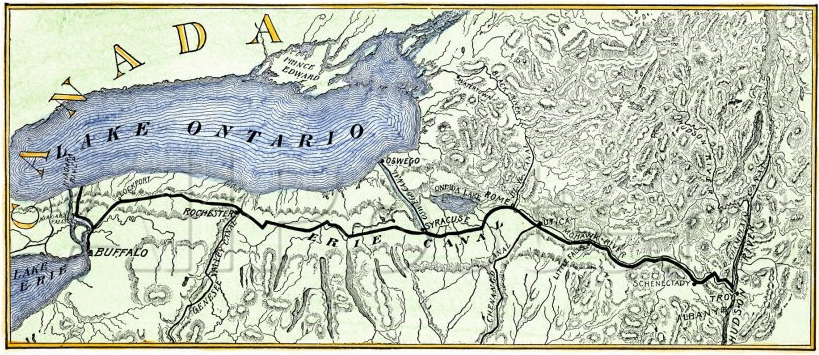
Map showing route of the Erie Canal, c. 1840

The Herkimer County Courthouse, Herkimer County Jail, Herkimer County Historical Society, The Reformed Church, Palatine German Frame House, and United States Post Office are all listed on the National Register of Historic Places. In 2000, the United States Congress designated the historic route of the Erie Canal, which runs through Herkimer village, as the Erie Canalway National Heritage Corridor. The villages, towns and landscape are all included in this designation as elements contributing to its significance.

== Geography ==
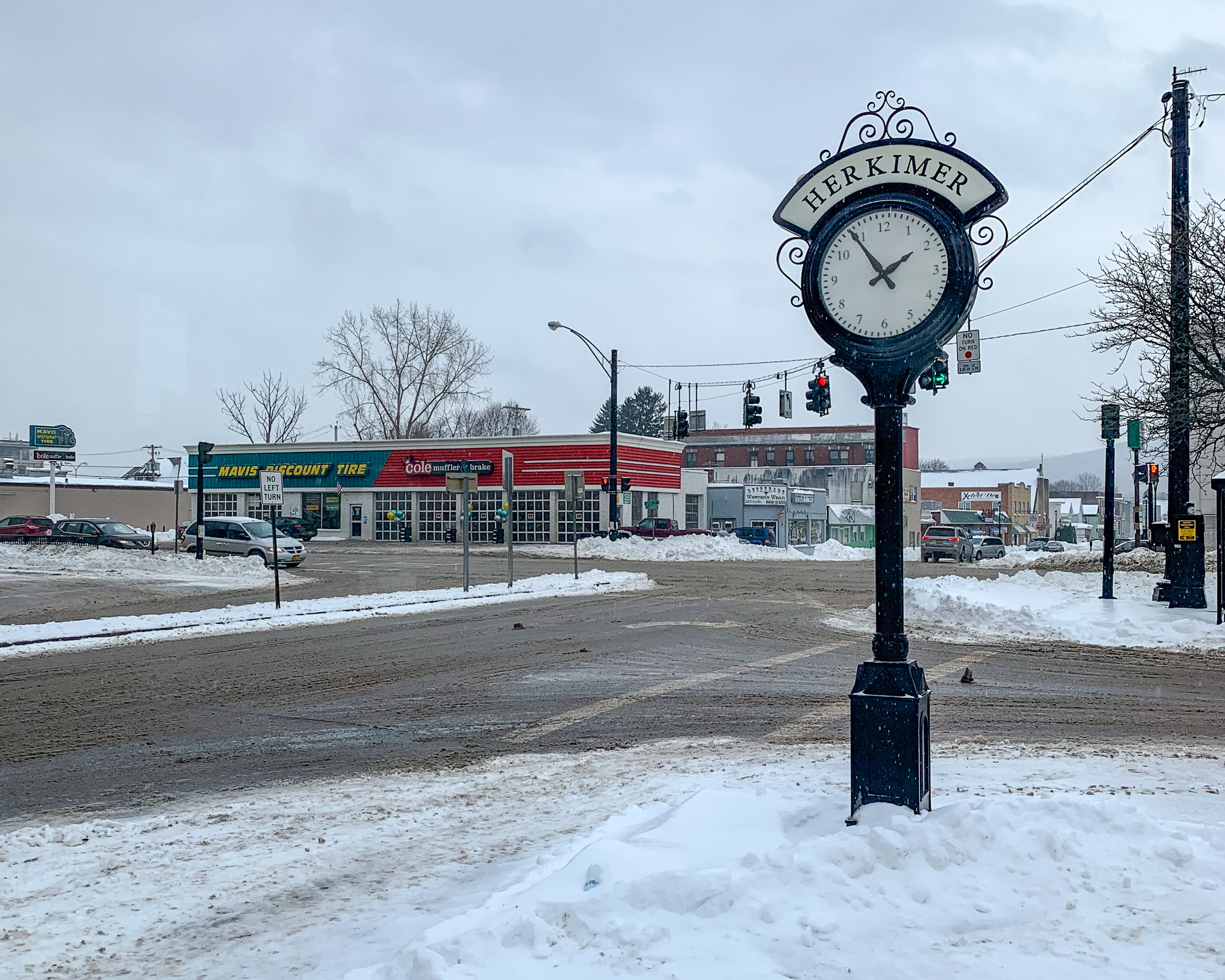
Downtown Herkimer

The village of Herkimer is located at coordinates 43°1′34″N 74°59′25″W (43.026207, -74.990304), in central New York state, roughly halfway between Syracuse and Albany and 15 miles (24 km) southeast of Utica. It is served by exit 30 on the New York State Thruway (Interstate 90). New York State Route 5 (State Street) and New York State Route 28 (Don Reile Boulevard/South Caroline Street/Mohawk Street) intersect and combine for a short distance within the village. The village is in the southern part of the town of Herkimer and has a total area of 2.7 square miles (7.0 km^{2}), of which 0.1 square miles (0.3 km^{2}), or 4.27%, is covered by water.

Herkimer is at the confluence of the Mohawk River and its tributary, West Canada Creek. The Plantation Island State Wildlife Management Area, consisting of round 300 acres (120 ha) of Mohawk River floodplain, lies on the opposite shore of West Canada Creek just southeast of the village. A smaller wildlife management area, providing access and parking for fishing on the creek, is just northeast of the village, along Shells Bush Road, across the Donald J. Mitchell Bridge from State Route 28.

=== Geological information ===
The Herkimer/Middleville area is a favorite collecting area for rockhounds due to its vast deposits of large, low-inclusion quartz crystals known as "Herkimer diamonds", similar to "Cape May diamonds". Although the minerals are not true diamonds, they are sometimes used as gemstones and incorporated into jewelry. The minerals formed in Cambrian-age limestone and dolomite, probably from groundwater action after the original formation of the rock in an ancient sea. According to locals, recovering a crystal still partly embedded in a chunk of its host rock is considered lucky.

Several commercial mines cater to tourists. They can break up rock or screen soil weathered from it to find the quartz. The quartz itself is resistant to weathering.

== Demographics ==
Historical population
| Census | Pop. | Note | %± |
|---|---|---|---|
| 1870 | 1,220 | | — |
| 1880 | 2,359 | | 93.4% |
| 1900 | 5,555 | | — |
| 1910 | 7,420 | | 33.6% |
| 1920 | 10,453 | | 40.9% |
| 1930 | 10,446 | | −0.1% |
| 1940 | 9,617 | | −7.9% |
| 1950 | 9,400 | | −2.3% |
| 1960 | 9,396 | | 0.0% |
| 1970 | 8,960 | | −4.6% |
| 1980 | 8,383 | | −6.4% |
| 1990 | 7,945 | | −5.2% |
| 2000 | 7,498 | | −5.6% |
| 2010 | 7,743 | | 3.3% |
| 2020 | 7,234 | | −6.6% |
U.S. Decennial Census 2020

As of the 2000 census, 7,498 people, 3,184 households, and 1,687 families were residing in the village. The population density was 3,107.1 inhabitants per square mile (1,199.7/km^{2}). There were 3,528 housing units at an average density of 1,462.0 per square mile (564.5/km^{2}).

The racial makeup of the village was 96.1% White, 1.2% African American, 0.2% Native American, 1.2% Asian, 0.5% from other races, and 0.6% from two or more races. Hispanics or Latinos of any race were 1.4% of the population.

Of the households, 23.6% had children under 18 living in them, 36.6% were married couples living together, 11.8% had a female householder with no husband present, and 47.0% were not family households. About 35.4% of all households were made up of individuals, and 17.8% had someone living alone who was 65 or older. The average household size was 2.21, and the average family size was 2.87.

In the village, the age distribution was 19.2% under 18, 15.3% from 18 to 24, 22.5% from 25 to 44, 20.5% from 45 to 64, and 22.6% who were 65 or older. The median age was 39.4 years. For every 100 females, there were 88.2 males. For every 100 females 18 and over, there were 84.9 males.

The median income for a household in the village was $24,762, and for a family was $38,892. Males had a median income of $30,266 versus $19,438 for females. The per capita income for the village was $16,498. About 8.1% of families and 14.8% of the population were below the poverty line, including 8.5% of children under age 18 and 10.0% of those age 65 or over.

== Major highways ==
- Interstate 90
- New York State Route 5
- New York State Route 28

== Media ==
Herkimer has one daily newspaper, the Times Telegram published in nearby Utica. Herkimer is also part of the Utica media market. Three radio stations are licensed to Herkimer: WNRS (1420 AM), WXUR (92.7 FM), and WVHC (91.5 FM) (which is licensed to Herkimer County Community College).

== Education ==
The village is part of the Herkimer Central School District.

Herkimer County Community College is a two-year community college in the northwestern part of the village, bounded on the north by Reservoir Road.

== Sports ==
The Herkimer Originals are owned by Scott Flansburg, and have competed in the American Basketball Association since 2021. They utilize numerous local venues including Herkimer County Community College, Notre Dame High School, and Utica University.

== Notable people ==
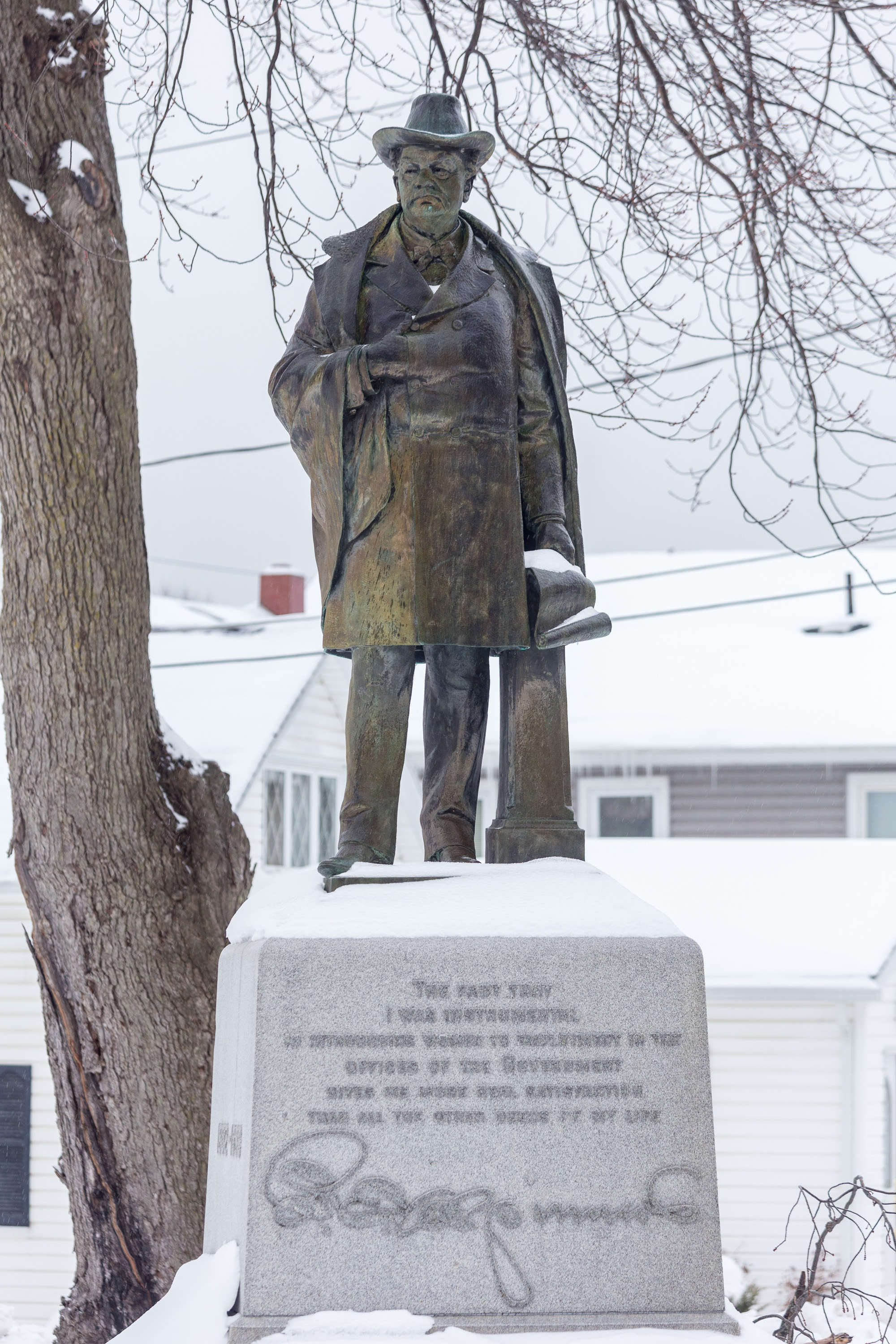
Statue of Francis E. Spinner in Myers Park

- George Cogar (1932–1983), computer pioneer, businessman
- Scott Flansburg (born 1963), listed in the Guinness Book of World Records for speed of mental calculation
- Jonas Folts (1808–1876; native of Herkimer), Wisconsin State Assemblyman and farmer
- Nicholas Herkimer (c. 1728–1777), American Revolutionary War general
- Charles S. Millington (1855–1913), U.S. congressman 1909–1911
- Donald J. Mitchell (1923–2003), U.S. congressman 1973–1983
- H.M. Quackenbush (1847–1933), inventor and industrialist, founder of the H.M. Quackenbush Co. in Herkimer
- Francis E. Spinner (1802–1890), treasurer of the United States during the Lincoln administration, longtime Herkimer resident honored with a statue in Myers Park
- Abram B. Steele (1845–1913), lawyer and member of the New York State Assembly
- Horace H. Witherstine (1852–1924), physician, mayor of Rochester, Minnesota, and Minnesota state senator

== In popular culture ==
- Theodore Dreiser's 1925 novel An American Tragedy is a fictionalized account of the events related to the 1908 trial and conviction of Chester Gillette for the murder of Grace Brown at Big Moose Lake in the Adirondacks. He was held in the Herkimer County Jail. The novel was adapted several times for stage plays, and for film and TV versions. These included the 1951 Paramount film A Place in the Sun, starring Elizabeth Taylor, Montgomery Clift, and Shelley Winters. Two nonfiction books recounted the historic murder case and execution of Gillette: Adirondack Tragedy: The Gillette Murder Case of 1906, by Joseph W. Brownell and Patricia A. Wawrzaszek, and Murder in the Adirondacks: An American Tragedy Revisited, by Craig Brandon.
- Walter D. Edmonds's novel Drums Along the Mohawk (1936) recounts the story of Adam Helmer's run to save the village during the Revolutionary War, together with an overview of the Germans' colonial settlement along the river. It was adapted as a film of the same name, released in 1939, directed by John Ford and starring Henry Fonda and Claudette Colbert.
- In the 1940s, the term "Herkimer jerkimer" was part of New York City slang, meaning yokel or country bumpkin.
