= Herkimer Central School District =

School district in New York, United States

- Herkimer, New York

District information
- Superintendent: Kathleen Carney
- School board: Herkimer Central School Board of Education
- Schools: 2

Other information
- Website: Official website

Herkimer Central School District is a public school district headquartered in Herkimer, New York. Two schools are in this district, Herkimer Elementary School and Herkimer High School.

In addition to the town of Herkimer, it extends into the Town of Little Falls. The district includes the Village of Herkimer.

== History ==
The school district was founded in 1899. The school's official colors are kelly green and white, and they are known as the magicians.

In 2012, voters in the district rejected proposals to merge with neighboring school districts.

In 2017 the school's board of education voted unanimously to move sixth graders from the elementary school to the high school beginning in the 2018–2019 school year.

== Board of education ==
The school district is overseen by the Herkimer Central School Board of Education, which is composed of seven duly elected members. As of 2022, the elected members of the board of education are:

- Brian Crandall (President)
- Michele Gilbert (Vice President)
- Joseph Lamanna
- Diann Fischer
- Aleksander Verenich
- Robert Mihevc
- Scott Petucci
