= Herkimer County Historical Society =

Historic house in New York, United States

- U.S. National Register of Historic Places
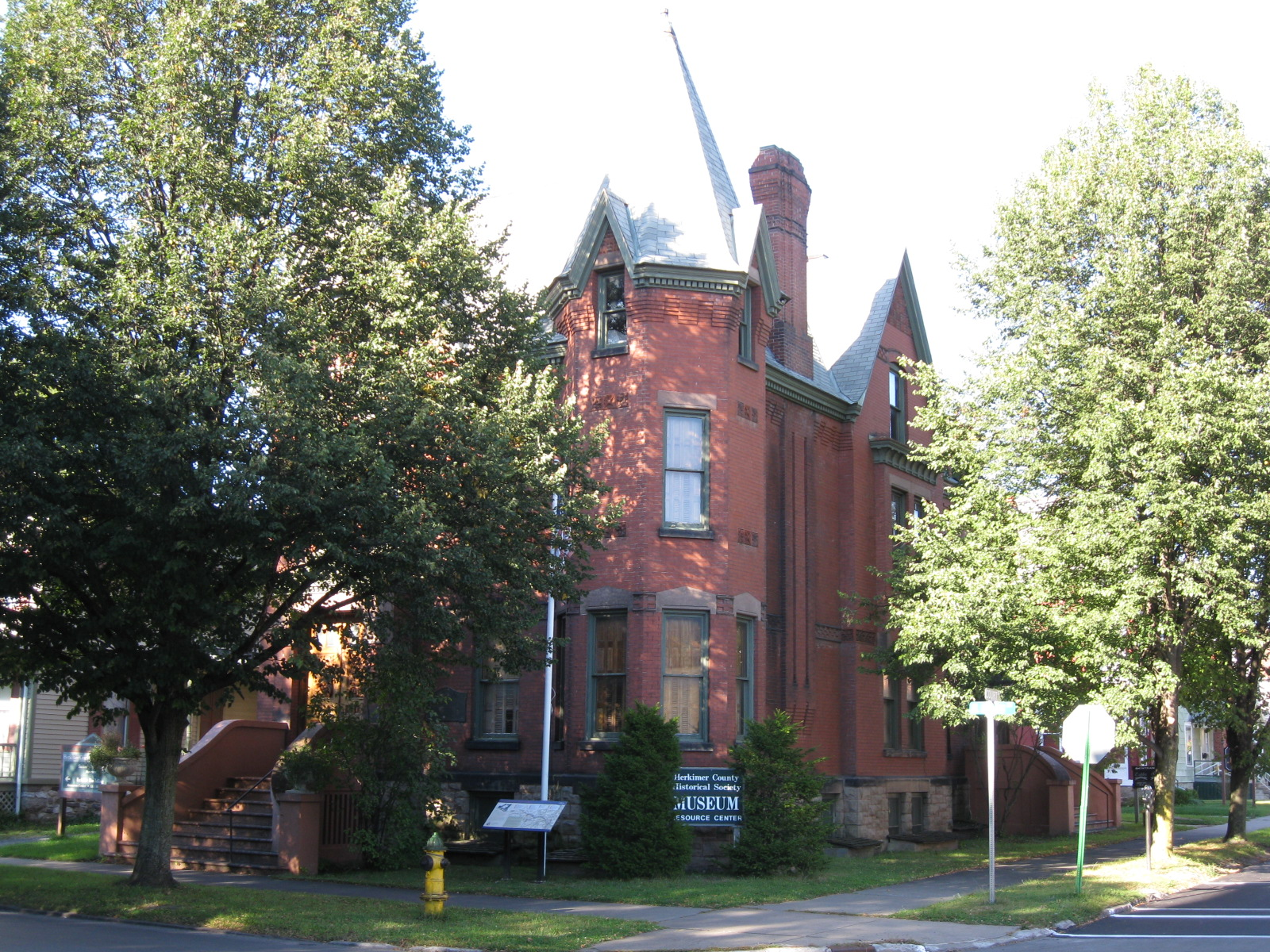
- Herkimer County Historical Society, September 2009

- Location within New York Location within the United States
- Location: 400 N. Main St., Herkimer, New York
- Coordinates: 43°1′45″N 74°59′22″W
- Area: 0 acres (0 ha)
- Built: 1884
- Architect: Cronk, E.C.; Brown, George
- NRHP reference No.: 72000845
- Added to NRHP: April 13, 1972

Herkimer County Historical Society is located in the Eckler House which is adjacent to the 1884 Suiter Building, a historic home in Herkimer, Herkimer County, New York. It is a 2 1/2-story, wood-frame structure with red pressed brick walls laid in black mortar built in 1884. It features a complex pitched roof of slate with a brick corbelled cornice and terra cotta ornament along the roof edge. There is also an octagonal peaked roof above the corner tower. Built originally as a private home, it was unfinished at the time of its builders death in 1925 and given to the Herkimer County Historical Society who occupied it in 1935. It the mid-1990s the Society built and renovated the adjacent Eckler House and moved its offices into that building. The Suiter building remained the museum and repository for artifacts and ephemera.

It was listed on the National Register of Historic Places in 1972.

The 1884 Herkimer County Historical Society Suiter Building Museum features exhibits about the county's early settlers and transportation, agriculture, industry and domestic life, and displays about the former Fairfield Academy.

The Historical Society is open for research and tours Monday-Friday from 10:00 to 4:00.
