= Herkimer County, New York =

County in New York, United States

- County
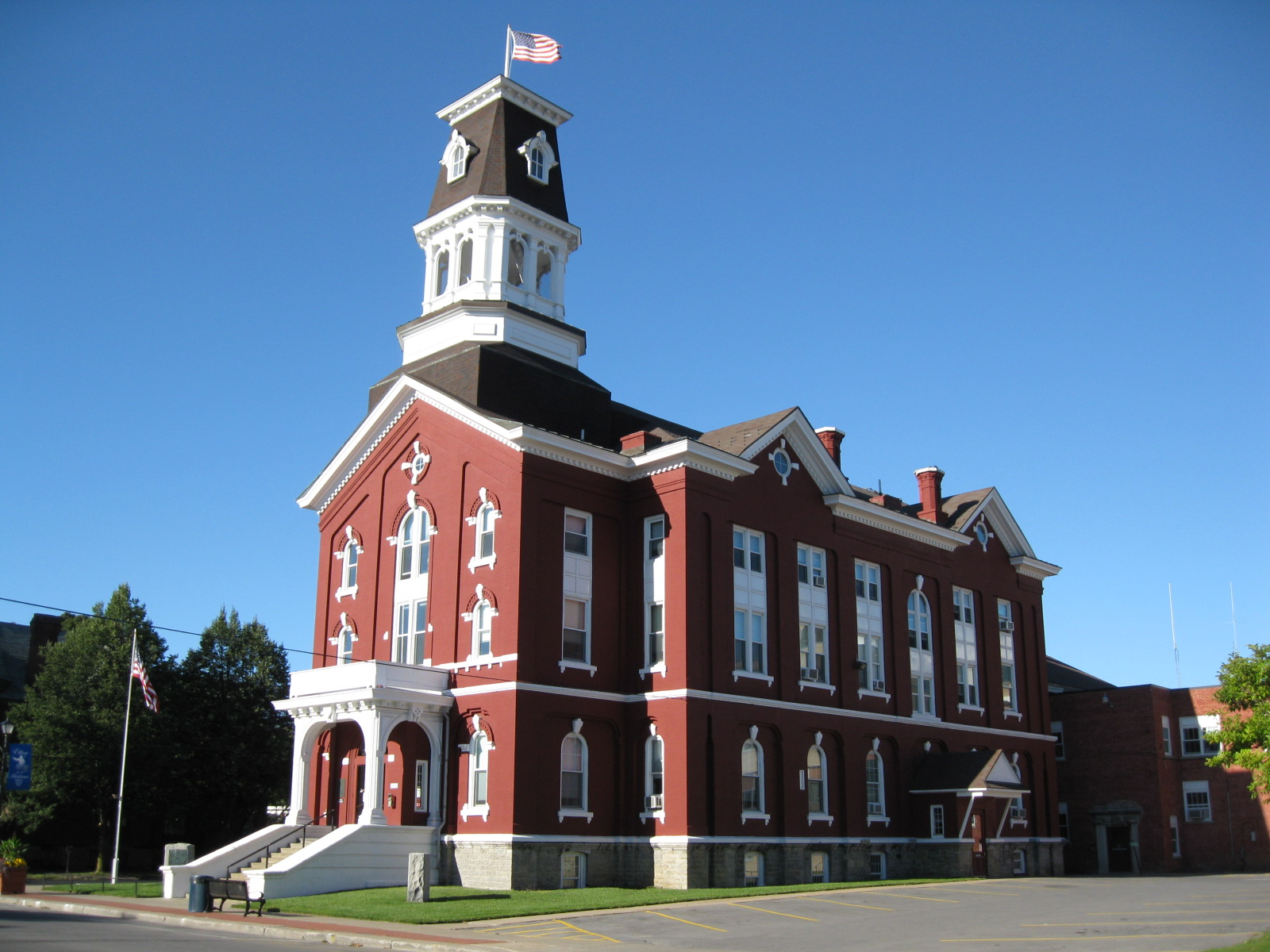
- Herkimer County Courthouse

- Flag Seal

- Location within the U.S. state of New York
- Coordinates: 43°25′N 74°58′W
- Country: United States
- State: New York
- Founded: 1791
- Named for: Nicholas Herkimer
- Seat: Herkimer
- Largest town: German Flatts

Area
  - Total: 1,458 sq mi (3,780 km^{2})
  - Land: 1,411 sq mi (3,650 km^{2})
  - Water: 46 sq mi (120 km^{2}) 3.2%

Population (2020)
  - Total: 60,139
  - Estimate (2025): 59,219 ▼
  - Density: 42.6/sq mi (16.4/km^{2})
- Time zone: UTC−5 (Eastern)
  - Summer (DST): UTC−4 (EDT)
- Congressional district: 21st
- Website: www.herkimercountyny.gov

Herkimer County is a county in the U.S. state of New York. As of the 2020 census, the population was 60,139. Its county seat is Herkimer. The county was created in 1791 north of the Mohawk River out of part of Montgomery County. It is named after General Nicholas Herkimer, who died from battle wounds in 1777 after taking part in the Battle of Oriskany during the Revolutionary War. The county is part of the Mohawk Valley region of the state.

Herkimer County is part of the Utica–Rome Metropolitan Statistical Area.

== History ==
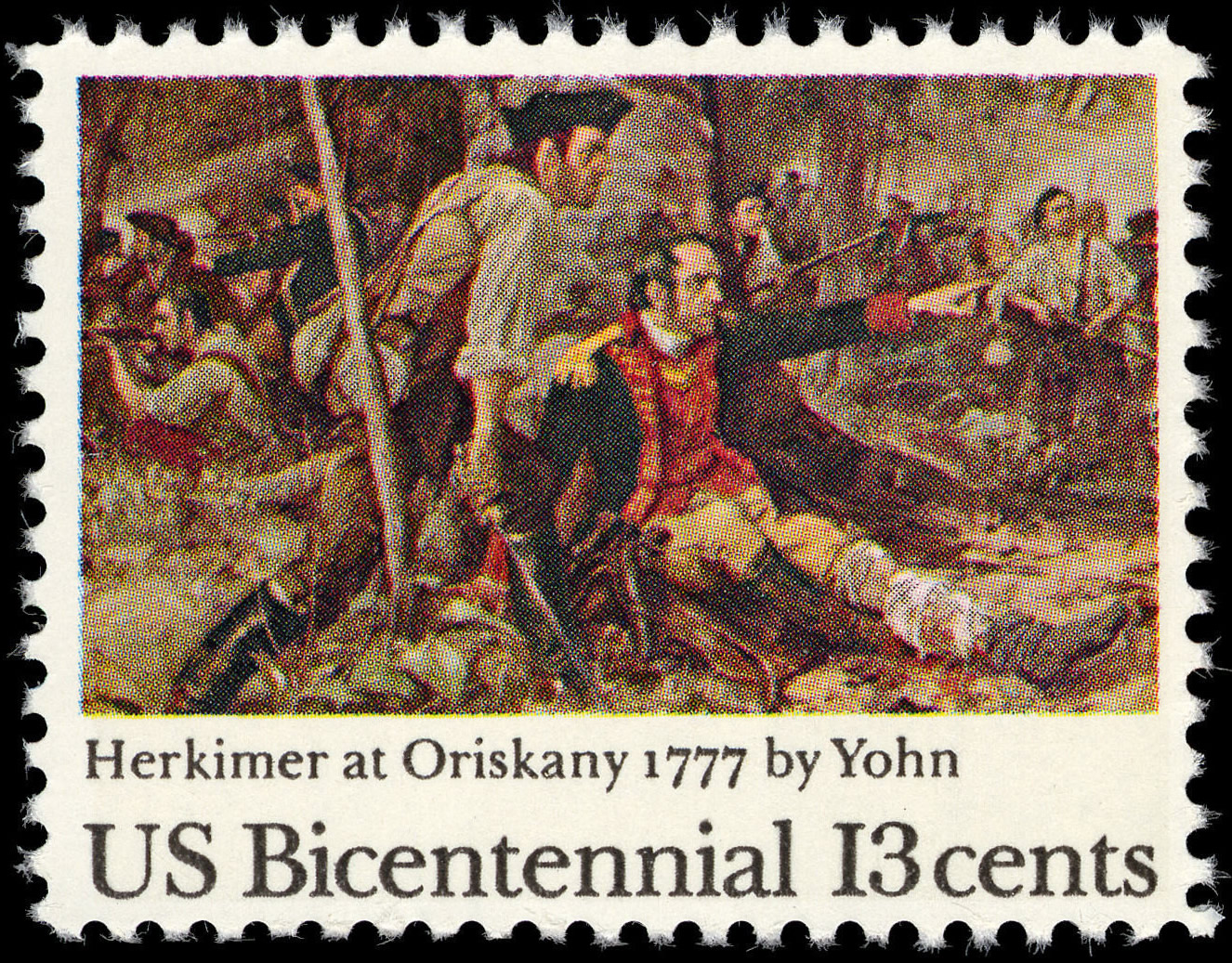
General Nicholas Herkimer, commander at the Battle of Oriskany in 1777 and namesake of Herkimer County

In 1791, Herkimer County was created as one of three counties split off from Montgomery (the other two being Otsego and Tioga counties) as New York State was developed after the American Revolutionary War. Its area was much larger than the present county, however, and was reduced subsequently as more counties were organized.

Part of Herkimer County was included in the Macomb's Purchase of 1791, during the wide-scale sale of public lands after the state forced Iroquois tribes allied with the British during the war to cede their territory. Suddenly the state was selling 5 million acres (20,000 km^{2}) of land in upstate, central and western New York.

In 1794, Onondaga County was split off from Herkimer County. This county was larger than the current Onondaga County, and included the present Cayuga, Cortland, and part of Oswego counties.

In 1798, portions of Herkimer and Tioga counties were taken to form Chenango County.

Another part of Herkimer was split off to form Oneida County. It was then larger than the current Oneida County, including the present Jefferson, Lewis, and part of Oswego counties.

In 1802, parts of Herkimer, Clinton and Montgomery counties were combined to form the new St. Lawrence County.

In the 1810s the county expanded to it's modern day borders with the county adding parts of southern Ostego and western Montgomery County under state laws passed in 1816 and 1817.

The rural economy was first based on general agriculture and then wheat, but after the opening of the Erie Canal, Herkimer farmers found that they could not compete with grain farmers to the west. By the mid-19th century, they had begun to specialize in dairy farming and created a cheese industry that supplied the New York City market, among others.

During the American Civil War, Herkimer contributed five companies to the 34th New York Volunteer Infantry Regiment, leading to the unit's nickname "The Herkimer Regiment".

The Herkimer County Jail, constructed in 1834, was used to hold the murderer Chester Gillette before his trial at the Herkimer County Courthouse. The jail is now disused, except for tours by the Herkimer County Historical Society.

The Herkimer County shootings took place in 2013, killing five people.

== Geography ==
According to the U.S. Census Bureau, the county has a total area of 1,458 square miles (3,780 km^{2}), of which 1,411 square miles (3,650 km^{2}) is land and 46 square miles (120 km^{2}) (3.2%) is water.

=== Adjacent counties ===
- St. Lawrence County - north
- Hamilton County - northeast
- Fulton County - east
- Montgomery County - southeast
- Otsego County - south
- Oneida County - west
- Lewis County - northwest

Herkimer County is in central New York State, northwest of Albany, and east of Syracuse. The northern part of the county is in the Adirondack Park. The Mohawk River flows across the southern part of the county. Herkimer County is larger than the State of Rhode Island

== Demographics ==
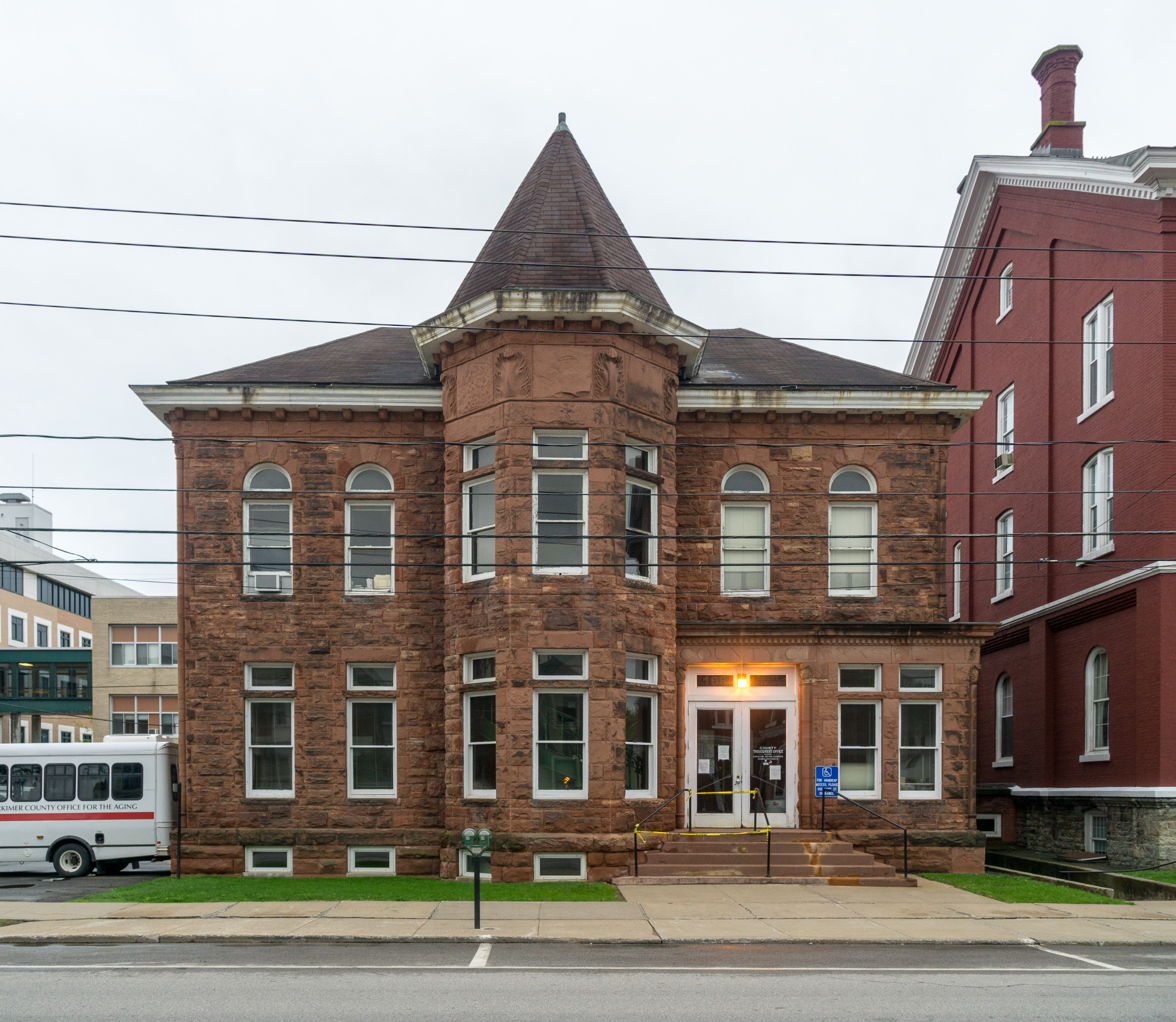
Herkimer County Treasurer's Office, 108 Court Street in Herkimer

Historical population
Census	Pop.	Note	%±
1800	14,479		—
1810	22,046		52.3%
1820	31,017		40.7%
1830	35,870		15.6%
1840	37,477		4.5%
1850	38,244		2.0%
1860	40,561		6.1%
1870	39,929		−1.6%
1880	42,669		6.9%
1890	45,608		6.9%
1900	51,049		11.9%
1910	56,356		10.4%
1920	64,962		15.3%
1930	64,006		−1.5%
1940	59,527		−7.0%
1950	61,407		3.2%
1960	66,370		8.1%
1970	67,633		1.9%
1980	66,714		−1.4%
1990	65,797		−1.4%
2000	64,427		−2.1%
2010	64,519		0.1%
2020	60,139		−6.8%
2025 (est.)	59,219	▼	−1.5%
U.S. Decennial Census; 1790–1960 1900–1990; 1990–2000 2010–2020

=== 2020 census ===
Herkimer County, New York – Racial and ethnic composition Note: the US Census treats Hispanic/Latino as an ethnic category. This table excludes Latinos from the racial categories and assigns them to a separate category. Hispanics/Latinos may be of any race.
Race / Ethnicity (NH = Non-Hispanic)	Pop 1980	Pop 1990	Pop 2000	Pop 2010	Pop 2020	% 1980	% 1990	% 2000	% 2010	% 2020
White alone (NH)	66,119	64,990	62,667	61,690	54,653	99.11%	98.77%	97.27%	95.62%	90.88%
Black or African American alone (NH)	114	182	305	640	682	0.17%	0.28%	0.47%	0.99%	1.13%
Native American or Alaska Native alone (NH)	83	106	121	137	76	0.12%	0.16%	0.19%	0.21%	0.13%
Asian alone (NH)	101	138	255	325	359	0.15%	0.21%	0.40%	0.50%	0.60%
Native Hawaiian or Pacific Islander alone (NH)	x	x	10	8	32	x	x	0.02%	0.01%	0.05%
Other race alone (NH)	38	11	15	36	153	0.06%	0.02%	0.02%	0.06%	0.25%
Mixed race or Multiracial (NH)	x	x	474	643	2,654	x	x	0.74%	1.00%	4.41%
Hispanic or Latino (any race)	259	370	580	1,040	1,530	0.39%	0.56%	0.90%	1.61%	2.54%
Total	66,714	65,797	64,427	64,519	60,139	100.00%	100.00%	100.00%	100.00%	100.00%

=== 2000 census ===
As of the census of 2000, there were 64,427 people, 25,734 households, and 17,113 families residing in the county. The population density was 46 inhabitants per square mile (18/km^{2}). There were 32,026 housing units at an average density of 23 units per square mile (8.9/km^{2}). The racial makeup of the county was 97.83% White, 0.51% Black or African American, 0.22% Native American, 0.41% Asian, 0.02% Pacific Islander, 0.18% from other races, and 0.84% from two or more races. 0.90% of the population were Hispanic or Latino of any race. 20.6% were of Italian, 16.3% German, 13.9% Irish, 9.3% English, 7.7% Polish, 6.2% American and 5.2% French ancestry according to Census 2000. 95.2% spoke English, 1.2% Spanish and 1.1% Italian as their first language.

There were 25,734 households, out of which 30.60% had children under the age of 18 living with them, 51.20% were married couples living together, 10.30% had a female householder with no husband present, and 33.50% were non-families. 27.60% of all households were made up of individuals, and 13.70% had someone living alone who was 65 years of age or older. The average household size was 2.46 and the average family size was 2.99.

In the county, the population was spread out, with 24.40% under the age of 18, 8.30% from 18 to 24, 26.60% from 25 to 44, 24.00% from 45 to 64, and 16.80% who were 65 years of age or older. The median age was 39 years. For every 100 females there were 94.20 males. For every 100 females age 18 and over, there were 91.70 males.

The median income for a household in the county was $32,924, and the median income for a family was $40,570. Males had a median income of $29,908 versus $21,518 for females. The per capita income for the county was $16,141. About 8.90% of families and 12.50% of the population were below the poverty line, including 15.60% of those under age 18 and 10.40% of those age 65 or over.

== Government and politics ==
United States presidential election results for Herkimer County, New York
Year	Republican		Democratic		Third party(ies)	
Year	No.	%	No.	%	No.	%
1884	6,138	51.79%	5,329	44.97%	384	3.24%
1888	6,683	52.87%	5,611	44.39%	346	2.74%
1892	6,219	49.94%	5,526	44.37%	709	5.69%
1896	8,096	59.77%	5,027	37.11%	422	3.12%
1900	8,100	57.77%	5,401	38.52%	521	3.72%
1904	8,319	56.80%	5,827	39.79%	499	3.41%
1908	8,202	55.88%	5,918	40.32%	559	3.81%
1912	4,665	34.35%	5,122	37.72%	3,793	27.93%
1916	7,934	54.42%	6,271	43.01%	375	2.57%
1920	14,310	65.27%	6,507	29.68%	1,107	5.05%
1924	15,625	66.31%	6,464	27.43%	1,474	6.26%
1928	18,624	62.69%	10,654	35.86%	431	1.45%
1932	15,158	56.58%	11,194	41.78%	438	1.63%
1936	15,941	54.73%	12,847	44.10%	341	1.17%
1940	17,590	57.38%	13,013	42.45%	54	0.18%
1944	15,656	55.75%	12,381	44.08%	48	0.17%
1948	14,688	51.83%	12,577	44.38%	1,073	3.79%
1952	20,980	64.26%	11,599	35.53%	70	0.21%
1956	22,246	71.68%	8,789	28.32%	0	0.00%
1960	17,758	54.19%	14,977	45.71%	33	0.10%
1964	10,159	33.51%	20,136	66.42%	22	0.07%
1968	15,192	54.91%	10,940	39.54%	1,533	5.54%
1972	20,194	67.84%	9,487	31.87%	86	0.29%
1976	15,362	54.14%	12,875	45.37%	140	0.49%
1980	14,105	50.58%	11,497	41.23%	2,286	8.20%
1984	18,827	64.35%	10,346	35.36%	85	0.29%
1988	15,104	53.90%	12,694	45.30%	224	0.80%
1992	12,052	40.26%	10,880	36.34%	7,007	23.40%
1996	10,085	37.88%	11,910	44.73%	4,631	17.39%
2000	14,147	51.06%	12,224	44.12%	1,334	4.82%
2004	16,024	56.60%	11,675	41.24%	611	2.16%
2008	14,619	53.78%	12,094	44.49%	471	1.73%
2012	13,282	53.04%	11,273	45.02%	485	1.94%
2016	16,699	63.60%	8,083	30.79%	1,473	5.61%
2020	18,871	64.36%	9,939	33.90%	512	1.75%
2024	19,557	67.77%	9,110	31.57%	190	0.66%

Herkimer County is one of the most Republican counties in New York. Since 1884, it has voted for a Democratic presidential candidate only three times, with vote splitting due to a third-party candidate playing a role in two of those races. In the Trump era, the county's Republican tilt has increased, with the 2020 and 2024 elections being the strongest performance for the party there since Nixon's 1972 landslide. Since 2022, the entire county is within New York's 21st congressional district, presently held by Republican Elise Stefanik.

The Herkimer County Legislature consists of 17 members, each elected from single-member districts. As of 2023 the county legislature is almost entirely Republican: the single Democratic legislator also ran on the Conservative Party line.

In January 2025, the chairman of the Herkimer County Legislature took a plea deal settling charges from May 2024 of drug possession, an open-container law violation, and failing to safely store a firearm. On May 1, 2025, after being arrested for parole violation, he stepped down as chairman.

== Economy ==
Unusually clear, doubly terminated quartz crystals called Herkimer diamonds can be found in, and are named for, Herkimer County.

Ilion was home to the original factory of the Remington Arms Company until it was closed in March 2024.

== Education ==
Herkimer County Community College is located in the Village of Herkimer.

School districts include:

- Adirondack Central School District
- Central Valley School District
- Dolgeville Central School District
- Fort Plain Central School District
- Frankfort-Schuyler Central School District
- Herkimer Central School District
- Holland Patent Central School District
- Little Falls City School District
- Mount Markham Central School District
- New Hartford Central School District
- Oppenheim-Ephratah-St. Johnsville Central School District
- Poland Central School District
- Remsen Central School District
- Richfield Springs Central School District
- Sauquoit Valley Central School District
- Town of Webb Union Free School District
- Van Hornesville-Owen D. Young Central School District
- West Canada Valley Central School District
- Whitesboro Central School District

== Transportation ==
=== Airport ===
The following public use airport is located in the county:

- Frankfort-Highland Airport (6B4) – Frankfort

=== Rail ===
Passenger rail service by Amtrak is available at Utica, nearby to the west of the county. Up to the latter 1950s, New York Central Railroad trains such as the North Shore Limited (New York-Chicago) made stops at Little Falls. Until 1965, the New York Central operated passenger trains through Thendara in the upper part of the county.

=== Roads ===
Interstate 90, as part of the New York State Thruway, runs east–west through the lower part of the county, as does New York State Route 5. State Route 28 runs north–south through the county.

== Communities ==
=== Larger settlements ===
#	Location	Population	Type	Area
1	Ilion	7,646	Village	Canalside
2	†Herkimer	7,234	Village	Canalside
3	Little Falls	4,605	City	Canalside
4	Mohawk	2,415	Village	Canalside
5	Frankfort	2,320	Village	Canalside
6	‡Dolgeville	2,042	Village	Center
7	East Herkimer	787	CDP	Canalside
8	West Winfield	733	Village	South
9	Old Forge	727	CDP	Adirondack Park
10	East Frankfort	496	CDP	Canalside
11	Poland	464	Village	Center
12	Middleville	407	Village	Center
13	Salisbury Center	323	CDP	Center
14	Cold Brook	250	Village	Center
15	Thendara	195	CDP	Adirondack Park
16	South Ilion	119	CDP	Canalside
17	Eagle Bay	54	CDP	Adirondack Park

=== Towns ===
- Columbia
- Danube
- Fairfield
- Frankfort
- German Flatts
- Herkimer
- Litchfield
- Little Falls
- Manheim
- Newport
- Norway
- Ohio
- Russia
- Salisbury
- Schuyler
- Stark
- Warren
- Webb
- Winfield

=== Hamlets ===
- Beaver River
- Jordanville
- Newville

== See also ==
- List of counties in New York
- List of New York State Historic Markers in Herkimer County, New York
- National Register of Historic Places listings in Herkimer County, New York
