= List of county routes in Herkimer County, New York =

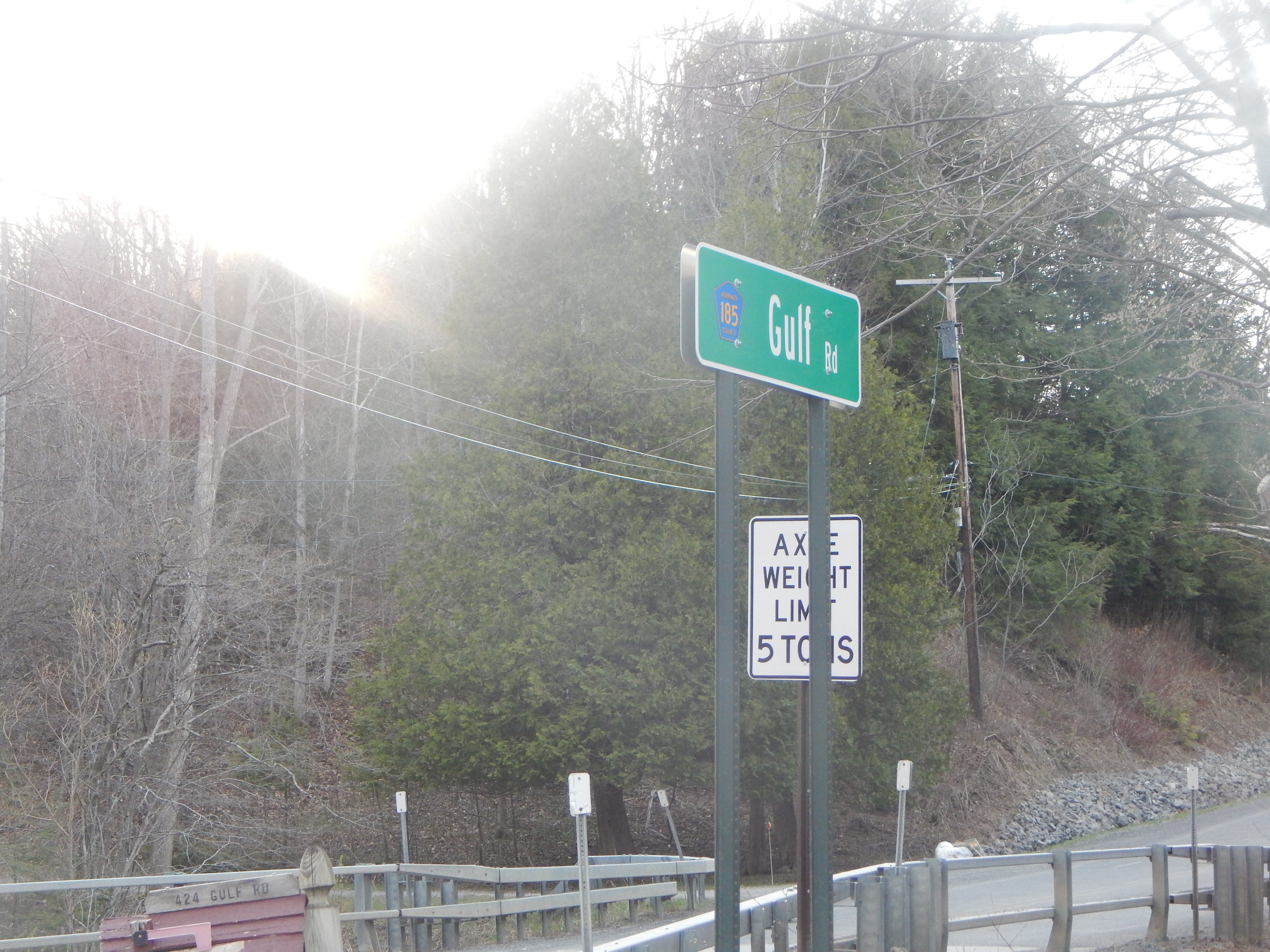
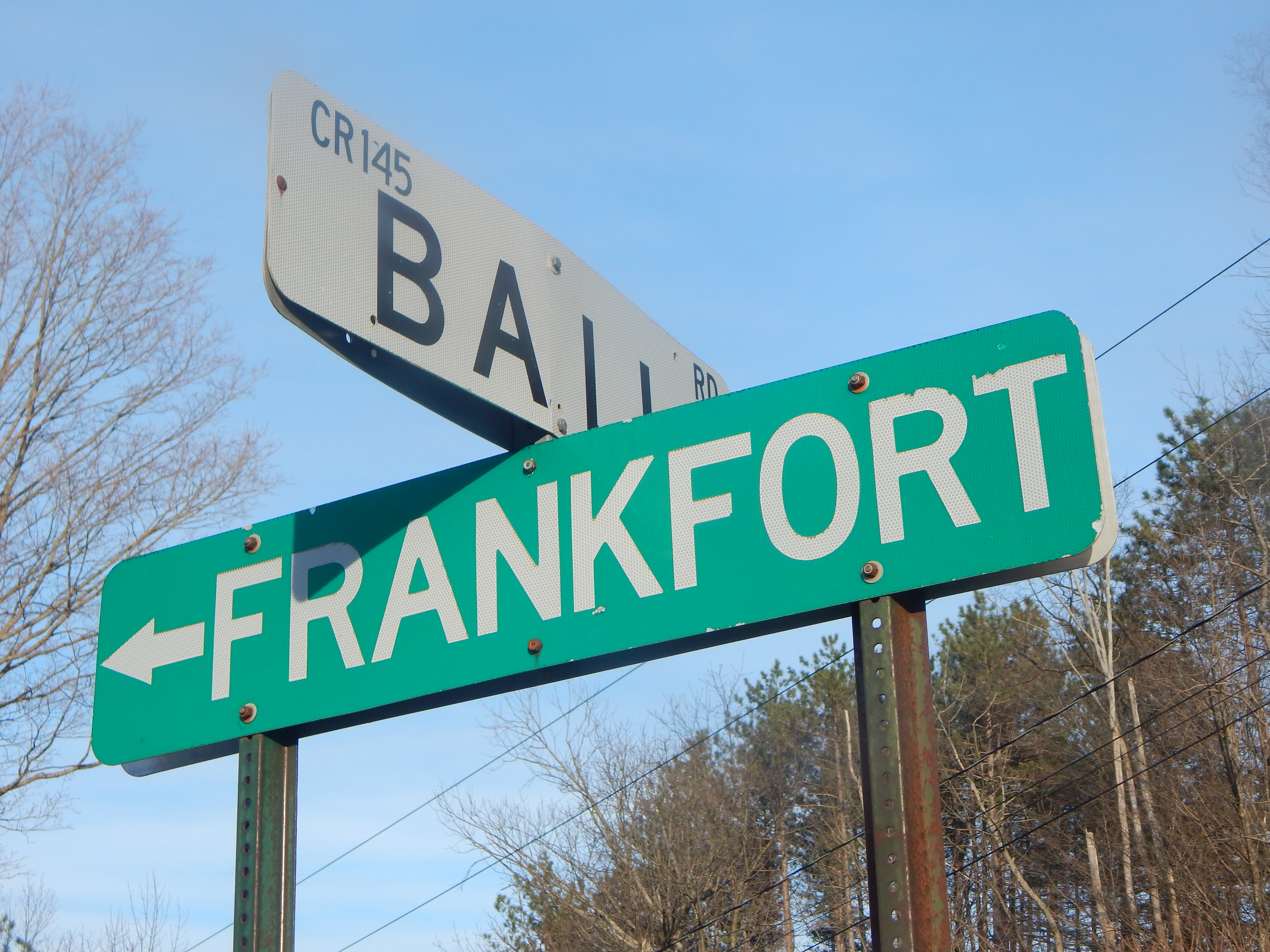
- Former (bottom) and current (top) signage systems of Herkimer County at the end of NY 171 in Gulph.

Highway names
- Interstates: Interstate X (I-X)
- US Highways: U.S. Route X (US X)
- State: New York State Route X (NY X)
- County: County Route X (CR X)

System links
- New York Highways; Interstate; US; State; Reference; Parkways

County routes in Herkimer County, New York, are typically signed only on street blade signs. Some routes are signed with the Manual on Uniform Traffic Control Devices-standard yellow-on-blue pentagon route marker; however, this is uncommon.

== Routes 1–100 ==
Route	Length (mi)	Length (km)	From	Via	To	Notes
CR 1	7.49	12.05	NY 28	Big Moose Road in Webb	Tracy Road	
CR 4	4.18	6.73	CR 111 at Norway town line	Gray Wilmurt Road in Ohio	CR 69	
CR 7	16.08	25.88	NY 28 in Herkimer	West End, Davis, and Castle roads	NY 28 in Newport	
CR 9	3.48	5.60	Little Falls city line	Burrell Road in Manheim	NY 170A	
CR 11	2.27	3.65	NY 5	Carder Lane Road in Schuyler	CR 53	
CR 13	6.39	10.28	NY 171	Furnace, Widrick, Center, and Welshbush roads in Frankfort	Oneida County line	
CR 14 (1)	2.55	4.10	CR 79 at Litchfield town line in Frankfort	Barringer Road	Ilion village line in German Flatts	
CR 14 (2)	0.55	0.89	CR 14 (segment 1)	Old Forge Road in German Flatts	NY 51	
CR 15	2.51	4.04	NY 51	Spinnerville Gulf Road in German Flatts	CR 124 at Columbia town line	
CR 16	6.77	10.90	Oneida County line (becomes CR 13)	Roberts, Ball, and Jerusalem Hill roads in Litchfield	NY 51	
CR 18	14.87	23.93	NY 51 in Columbia	Jordanville Road	NY 80 in Stark	
CR 21	4.49	7.23	CR 45	Fords Bush Road in Danube	Montgomery County line (becomes CR 109)	
CR 23	8.79	14.15	NY 5	Snells Bush and Bronner roads in Manheim	CR 9	
CR 26	1.91	3.07	NY 5	Newport and Cosby Manor roads in Schuyler	Oneida County line (becomes CR 29)	
CR 27	2.34	3.77	CR 79 in Litchfield	Joslin Hill Road	CR 81 in Frankfort	
CR 32	3.66	5.89	CR 102	Bellinger Road in Danube	NY 5S	
CR 34	5.45	8.77	CR 110 in Newport	Farrell, Hawthorne Gulf, and Newport roads and West Street	CR 200 in Newport village	
CR 36	10.00	16.09	CR 111 in Norway	Dairy Hill and Military roads	NY 29 / CR 114 in Salisbury	
CR 37	1.90	3.06	CR 241 in Frankfort	Dyke and Southside roads	NY 5 in Schuyler	
CR 42	1.45	2.33	NY 167	Dockey Road in Manheim	CR 23	Designated as part of NY 435 from ca. 1940 to ca. 1942; NY 435 continued south to NY 5 on current CR 23.
CR 43	4.42	7.11	NY 51	Elizabethtown Road in Columbia	CR 105 at German Flatts town line	
CR 45	2.64	4.25	NY 167 in Little Falls	Newville Road	CR 102 in Danube	
CR 46	5.20	8.37	NY 28 in German Flatts	Robinson Road	NY 167 in Warren	
CR 47	1.72	2.77	CR 242	Russia Road in Russia	CR 113	
CR 48	3.81	6.13	NY 8	Hurricane Road in Norway	CR 111	
CR 49	4.08	6.57	US 20 in Winfield	Wall Street	NY 51 in Litchfield	
CR 50	0.94	1.51	CR 13	Ferguson Road in Frankfort	CR 241	
CR 51	4.33	6.97	CR 13	Higby and Brockway roads in Frankfort	CR 104	
CR 52	3.06	4.92	CR 13	Mucky Run Road in Frankfort	Southside Road	
CR 53	6.39	10.28	NY 5	Windfall, Shortlots, Dutchtown, and Millers Grove roads in Schuyler	NY 5	
CR 54	0.63	1.01	NY 28	Crosby Road, Park Avenue, and South Shore Road in Webb	Former Old Forge village line	
CR 55	2.07	3.33	NY 167	Murphy Road in Manheim	CR 23	
CR 58	3.05	4.91	CR 163 in Newport	Summit Road	NY 28 in Middleville	
CR 59	3.65	5.87	Oneida County line in Litchfield (becomes CR 9)	Graffenburg Road	Oneida County line in Frankfort (becomes CR 22)	
CR 60	5.22	8.40	NY 28 in Newport	White Creek and Elm Tree roads	CR 111 in Norway	
CR 61	2.27	3.65	CR 53	Minots Corners Road in Schuyler	CR 165	
CR 62	4.84	7.79	CR 53 in Schuyler	Baum and Steuben Hill roads	Bridge over Mirror Lake canal in Herkimer village	
CR 65	2.35	3.78	Oneida County line (becomes CR 37)	North Gage Road in Newport	CR 200	
CR 66	4.01	6.45	Flint Ave Extension in Little Falls	Paradise Road	CR 45 in Danube	
CR 67	0.53	0.85	US 20 / NY 51	North Street in West Winfield	CR 119 at West Winfield village line	
CR 68	7.20	11.59	NY 28 in Mohawk	Shoemaker and Vrooman roads	NY 168 in German Flatts	
CR 69	5.06	8.14	CR 4	Gray Wilmurt Road in Ohio	NY 8	
CR 70	2.96	4.76	CR 126 at Little Falls town line	Cole Road in Fairfield	CR 7	
CR 71	1.78	2.86	CR 98	Chyle Road in Warren	Otsego County line (becomes CR 29)	
CR 73	3.63	5.84	CR 133 in Russia	Grant, Pardeeville, and Fisher roads	CR 112 at Black Creek bridge in Ohio	
CR 74	2.68	4.31	NY 80	Elwood Road in Stark	Montgomery County line (becomes CR 76)	
CR 75	0.40	0.64	Old railroad grade	Chepachet Road in Winfield	NY 51	
CR 76	1.14	1.83	NY 8	Nellis Road in Ohio	CR 4	
CR 77	0.13	0.21	NY 28	Military Road in Cold Brook	CR 113 at Cold Brook village line	
CR 78	2.26	3.64	NY 167	Millstone Road in Warren	US 20	
CR 79	5.72	9.21	NY 51	Cedarville and Barringer roads in Litchfield	CR 14 at Frankfort town line	
CR 81	1.07	1.72	Litchfield Road	Reese Road in Frankfort	Main Street	
CR 82	4.32	6.95	CR 21	Fiery Hill and Phillip roads in Danube	Montgomery County line (becomes CR 71)	
CR 83	0.77	1.24	McKinley Avenue	State Street Extension in Dolgeville	CR 114 at Dolgeville village line	
CR 84	2.04	3.28	NY 28	Joy Tract Road in Webb	NY 28	
CR 85	4.73	7.61	NY 51	Miller Mills and Casler roads in Columbia	CR 101	
CR 86	2.57	4.14	CR 7 in Fairfield	North Creek Road	NY 169 in Herkimer	
CR 87	4.99	8.03	CR 58 in Newport	Cook Hill and Schrader Hill roads	NY 28 in Newport	
CR 88	2.40	3.86	CR 128	Butler Road in Newport	CR 163	
CR 89	3.46	5.57	CR 110	Strumlock Road in Newport	CR 200	
CR 90	3.50	5.63	CR 73	Grant Road in Russia	CR 151	
CR 91	2.10	3.38	Oneida County line (becomes CR 1)	Babcock Hill Road in Winfield	CR 132	
CR 92	0.63	1.01	NY 170 in Little Falls	Yellow Church Road	CR 9 in Manheim	
CR 93	1.55	2.49	NY 28	Rondaxe Road in Webb	Dead end at Lake Rondaxe	
CR 94	2.49	4.01	NY 28	Shells Bush Road in Herkimer	CR 106	
CR 95	3.91	6.29	NY 80	Wiltse Hill Road in Stark	Otsego County line (becomes CR 30)	
CR 96	2.87	4.62	CR 13	Higby Road in Frankfort	NY 5S	
CR 97	1.60	2.57	Avery Road	McGowan Road and Prospect Street in Frankfort	NY 5S	
CR 98	3.12	5.02	CR 131	Little Lakes Road in Warren	CR 18	
CR 99	1.39	2.24	NY 167	Brockett and Lyon roads and Spencer Street in Manheim	CR 168 at Dolgeville village line	
CR 100	3.54	5.70	CR 106 in Herkimer	Burt Road	NY 169 in Little Falls	

== Routes 101–200 ==
Route	Length (mi)	Length (km)	From	Via	To	Notes
CR 101	2.83	4.55	Old railroad grade	McKoons Road in Columbia	CR 18	
CR 102	3.86	6.21	CR 21	Creek and Depot roads in Danube	Dead end at New York State Thruway	
CR 103	4.20	6.76	CR 7 in Newport	Platform Road	NY 29 in Fairfield	
CR 104	4.46	7.18	CR 107 at Litchfield town line	Albany Road in Frankfort	Oneida County line	
CR 105	1.25	2.01	CR 43 at Columbia town line	Elizabethtown Road in German Flatts	CR 15	
CR 106	2.93	4.72	CR 258	Pine Grove and Shells Bush roads in Herkimer	CR 126 at Little Falls town line	
CR 107	5.97	9.61	CR 104 at Frankfort town line	Albany Road in Litchfield	CR 119 at Winfield town line	
CR 109	2.15	3.46	CR 55	Davis Road in Manheim	End of county maintenance	
CR 110	1.97	3.17	Oneida County line	Steuben Road in Newport	CR 34	
CR 111	8.56	13.78	NY 28 in Newport village	Newport–Gray Road	CR 4 at Ohio town line in Norway	Part west of CR 36 was designated NY 317 from 1930 to early 1940s
CR 112	2.92	4.70	CR 73 at Black Creek bridge	Fisher and Santmire roads in Ohio	CR 4	
CR 113	7.57	12.18	CR 77 at Cold Brook village line	Military, Hinckley, and Black Creek roads in Russia	Oneida County line (becomes CR 51)	
CR 114	2.39	3.85	NY 29 / CR 36 in Salisbury	Military Road	CR 83 at Dolgeville village line in Manheim	
CR 115	5.10	8.21	CR 53	Windfall and Newport roads in Schuyler	CR 128 at Newport town line	
CR 116	4.53	7.29	NY 167 in Little Falls	Aney Hill Road	CR 18 in Stark	
CR 117	2.93	4.72	CR 121	Hicks Road in Warren	CR 18	
CR 118	9.87	15.88	Former Old Forge village line	South Shore Road in Webb	Hamilton County line (becomes CR 1)	
CR 119	3.60	5.79	CR 67 at West Winfield village line	North Winfield and Albany roads in Winfield	CR 107 at Litchfield town line	
CR 120	2.05	3.30	CR 68 in German Flatts	Oregon Road	NY 167 in Little Falls	
CR 121	0.60	0.97	NY 167	Hicks Road in Warren	CR 117	
CR 122	0.75	1.21	Kelly Road	Ohio City Road in Ohio	NY 8	Includes connector to NY 8 (Church Street) at east end
CR 123	2.12	3.41	CR 43	Brewer Road in Columbia	CR 124	
CR 124	1.70	2.74	CR 15 at German Flatts town line	Polly Miller Road in Columbia	CR 259	
CR 125	2.68	4.31	CR 15	Warren and Ward roads in German Flatts	NY 28	
CR 126	4.92	7.92	CR 106 at Herkimer in Little Falls	Shells Bush, Cole, and Top Notch roads	NY 170 in Little Falls	Includes spur (Cole Road) to CR 70 at Fairfield town line
CR 127	1.41	2.27	CR 42	Inghams Mills Road in Manheim	Fulton County line (becomes CR 108)	
CR 128	2.67	4.30	CR 115 at Schuyler town line	Newport Road in Newport	CR 34	
CR 129	3.63	5.84	CR 4	Bull Hill Road in Ohio	End CR 129	
CR 130	3.55	5.71	NY 29A	Emmonsburg Road in Salisbury	Fulton County line (becomes CR 104)	
CR 131	2.26	3.64	US 20	Little Lakes Road in Warren	CR 98	
CR 132	3.75	6.04	CR 119	Brace and Babcock Hill roads in Winfield	CR 49	
CR 133	3.13	5.04	CR 73	Russia and Grant roads in Russia	CR 73	
CR 135	3.55	5.71	NY 167 in Warren	Rock Hill Road	NY 168 in German Flatts	
CR 136	3.48	5.60	NY 167 in Little Falls	Johnnycake Road	CR 45 in Danube	
CR 137	1.92	3.09	End of county maintenance	Folts Road in Herkimer	CR 94	
CR 138	0.45	0.72	Otsego County line (becomes CR 29)	Chyle Road in Stark	NY 80	
CR 139	3.61	5.81	CR 89	Honey Hill Road in Newport	CR 200	
CR 140	2.17	3.49	NY 5	Gun Club Road in Little Falls	CR 100	
CR 141	2.70	4.35	US 20	Stone Road in Winfield	Oneida County line (becomes CR 2A)	
CR 142	8.33	13.41	CR 70 in Fairfield	Hardscrabble Road	CR 60 in Norway	
CR 144	3.60	5.79	CR 7 in Fairfield	Thompson Road	CR 114 in Salisbury	
CR 145	2.86	4.60	CR 16	Ball Road in Litchfield	NY 171	
CR 146	2.14	3.44	CR 23	Brockett Road in Manheim	CR 99	
CR 147	3.89	6.26	CR 36 in Norway	Black Creek Road	CR 129 in Ohio	
CR 148	3.32	5.34	CR 9	Peckville Road in Manheim	CR 99	
CR 149	1.85	2.98	CR 43	North Columbia Road in Columbia	CR 124	
CR 150	2.91	4.68	Old railroad grade	McKoons Road in Columbia	NY 28	
CR 151	3.96	6.37	Oneida County line	Hinckley and South Side roads in Russia	CR 90	
CR 153	1.52	2.45	US 20	Gulf Road in Winfield	Otsego County line (becomes CR 25)	
CR 154	3.11	5.01	CR 26	Newport Road in Schuyler	CR 115	
CR 155	4.64	7.47	CR 46 in German Flatts	Kingdom Road	NY 167 in Warren	
CR 156	2.92	4.70	CR 66	Lower Paradise Road in Danube	NY 5S	
CR 159	1.97	3.17	NY 169	Dise Road in Little Falls	NY 170	
CR 160	6.93	11.15	NY 80 in Stark	Travis Road	CR 136 in Danube	
CR 162	1.03	1.66	Otsego County line (becomes CR 18A)	Forks Road in Winfield	NY 51	
CR 163	6.24	10.04	CR 115 in Schuyler	Hawthorne Road	CR 88 in Newport	
CR 164	1.78	2.86	NY 29	Hopson Road in Salisbury	Nash Road	
CR 165	4.43	7.13	CR 62 in Herkimer	Steuben Hill and Upson roads	CR 180 in Schuyler	
CR 166	3.88	6.24	CR 145 in Litchfield	Clemons Road	CR 27 in Frankfort	
CR 167	2.49	4.01	CR 16	Silver Street in Litchfield	CR 79	
CR 168	0.40	0.64	CR 99 at Dolgeville village line	Spencer Street in Dolgeville	Helmer Avenue	
CR 169	3.44	5.54	CR 132 in Winfield	Berberick Road	CR 16 in Litchfield	
CR 170	1.77	2.85	CR 107	Prior Road in Litchfield	CR 16	
CR 171	1.31	2.11	CR 60	White Creek Road in Newport	CR 111	
CR 172	4.36	7.02	West Winfield village line	Fairground and Meeting House roads in Winfield	CR 132	
CR 173	1.95	3.14	US 20	Hoke Road in Warren	Otsego County line (becomes CR 53)	
CR 175	1.78	2.86	Oneida County line (becomes CR 5)	Goodier Road in Litchfield	CR 107	
CR 177	0.90	1.45	Otsego County line (becomes CR 55)	Chepachet Road in Winfield	CR 75	
CR 178	1.52	2.45	NY 168 in Stark	Fiery Hill Road	CR 82 in Danube	
CR 179	1.15	1.85	CR 116	Bush Road in Stark	CR 160	
CR 180	3.03	4.88	CR 53	Bush Road in Schuyler	CR 61	
CR 183	4.69	7.55	NY 28 in Columbia	Cullen and Hogsback roads	CR 98 in Warren	
CR 184	3.68	5.92	CR 90	Pardeeville Road in Russia	CR 73	
CR 185	1.25	2.01	CR 104	Gulf Road in Frankfort	NY 171	
CR 186	3.72	5.99	Oneida County line (becomes CR 24A)	Higby Road in Frankfort	CR 51	
CR 187	0.87	1.40	Oneida County line	Brayton Road in Newport	CR 89	
CR 188	2.03	3.27	NY 5S	River Road in Danube	Montgomery County line	
CR 189	1.63	2.62	NY 168	Upper Deck Road in Stark	CR 160	
CR 190	0.34	0.55	CR 49	Marriott Road in Winfield	CR 172	
CR 191	3.02	4.86	NY 169 in Middleville	Parkhurst Road	CR 142 in Fairfield	
CR 195	0.64	1.03	CR 132	Cross Road in Winfield	CR 172	
CR 196	1.33	2.14	NY 167 in Manheim	Barker Road	NY 167 in Dolgeville	
CR 197	2.90	4.67	CR 180	Mowers Road in Schuyler	CR 163	
CR 198	1.62	2.61	CR 165	Steuben Hill Road in Herkimer	CR 87	
CR 199	1.79	2.88	CR 164	Dutchtown Road in Salisbury	CR 130	
CR 200	3.46	5.57	NY 28 in Newport village	Bridge Street and Old State Road	NY 28 in Poland	

== Routes 201 and up ==
Route	Length (mi)	Length (km)	From	Via	To	Notes
CR 201	2.89	4.65	CR 58 in Newport	Fishing Rock Road	NY 28 in Middleville	
CR 202	2.43	3.91	CR 123	Spohn Road in Columbia	CR 259	
CR 203	0.90	1.45	CR 18	Puskarenko Road in Stark	CR 160	
CR 204	0.96	1.54	Otsego County line	Wiltse Corners Road in Stark	CR 95	
CR 205	1.00	1.61	CR 47	Hinckley Road in Russia	CR 113	
CR 206	2.73	4.39	NY 168 in Stark	Lighthall Road	Montgomery County line in Danube (becomes CR 72)	
CR 211	1.39	2.24	NY 5	Watkins Road in Schuyler	CR 62	
CR 212	1.96	3.15	CR 68	Griffin Road in German Flatts	NY 5S	
CR 213	1.74	2.80	NY 5S	Dillenbeck Road in Danube	CR 32	
CR 214	5.14	8.27	Oneida County line (becomes CR 73)	North Lake Road in Ohio	Farr Road	
CR 215	1.20	1.93	NY 28	Graves Road in Newport	NY 28	
CR 216	2.86	4.60	NY 28	Hollywood Road in Webb	NY 28	
CR 218	1.04	1.67	NY 8 in Poland	Buck Hill Road	CR 113 in Russia	
CR 220	1.90	3.06	NY 29 in Middleville	Reservoir Road	CR 103 in Fairfield	
CR 221	2.91	4.68	CR 36	Curtiss Road in Salisbury	North Street	
CR 222	0.41	0.66	Oneida County line	Mallory Road in Frankfort	CR 59	
CR 224	4.66	7.50	CR 111 in Newport	Rose Valley Road	NY 8 in Cold Brook	
CR 226	2.03	3.27	NY 5S	Sandy Lane Road in Little Falls	NY 5S	
CR 231	1.60	2.57	NY 5	Smalls Bush Road in Herkimer	Eatonville Road	
CR 234	1.96	3.15	CR 82	Klock Road in Danube	Montgomery County line (becomes CR 124)	
CR 235	1.15	1.85	NY 5	Bidleman Road in Manheim	NY 167	
CR 239	1.60	2.57	CR 164	Marsh Road in Salisbury	NY 29	
CR 240	1.37	2.20	CR 13	Center Road in Frankfort	CR 241	
CR 241	1.29	2.08	Oneida County line	Bleecker Street in Frankfort	CR 240	
CR 242	1.78	2.86	NY 28	Gravesville Road in Russia	NY 28	
CR 243	1.17	1.88	CR 154	Cosby Manor Road in Schuyler	CR 53	
CR 245	0.51	0.82	NY 5	West German Street in Herkimer	Herkimer village line	
CR 246	1.68	2.70	NY 5	Ashe Road in Manheim	NY 5	
CR 247	2.05	3.30	Oneida County line	Dover Road in Russia	CR 113	
CR 251	1.03	1.66	CR 142	Teall Road in Fairfield	CR 7	
CR 253	1.72	2.77	West Winfield village line	Burrows Road in Winfield	End of county maintenance	
CR 254	0.22	0.35	NY 51 in Litchfield	Johnson Road	CR 43 in Columbia	
CR 255	1.01	1.63	CR 16	Birdseye Road in Litchfield	CR 79	
CR 257	0.70	1.13	NY 5S	Washington Street	NY 28/NY 28	Former number; became NY 922B
CR 258	1.16	1.87	NY 5	Gros Blvd in Herkimer	Dead end	
CR 259	2.18	3.51	CR 18	Columbia Center Road in Columbia	NY 28	

== See also ==
- County routes in New York
- List of former state routes in New York (301–400)
