= Utica–Rome metropolitan area =

Utica–Rome, New York
- Metropolitan Statistical Area
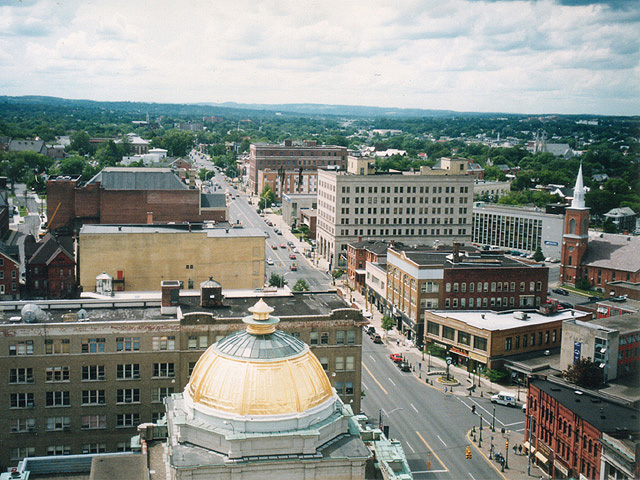
- Looking south on Utica's Genesee Street
Interactive Map of Utica–Rome, NY MSA
Utica–Rome, NY MSA
City of Utica
City of Rome
- Country: United States
- State: New York
- Counties: Herkimer; Oneida
- Principal cities: Utica; Rome

Area
  - Total: 2,620 sq mi (6,790 km^{2})

Population (2020)
  - Total: 292,264
  - Rank: US: 168

GDP
  - Total: $15.115 billion (2022)
- Time zone: UTC−5 (EST)
  - Summer (DST): UTC−4 (EDT)

The Utica–Rome Metropolitan Statistical Area, as defined by the United States Census Bureau, is an area consisting of two counties in Central New York anchored by the cities of Utica and Rome (both in Oneida County). As of the 2020 census, the MSA had a population of 292,264.

== Counties ==
- Oneida (not to be confused with the city of Oneida, New York in the neighbouring Madison County)
- Herkimer

== Communities ==
=== Places with more than 30,000 inhabitants ===
- Utica (Principal city)
- Rome (Principal city)

=== Places with 10,000 to 30,000 inhabitants ===
- German Flatts (town)
- Kirkland (town)
- New Hartford (town)
- Whitestown (town)

=== Places with 5,000 to 10,000 inhabitants ===
- Frankfort (town)
- Herkimer (town)
- Herkimer (village)
- Ilion (village)
- Lee (town)
- Marcy (town)
- Vernon (town)
- Verona (town)
- Vienna (town)
- Westmoreland (town)

=== Places with 1,000 to 5,000 inhabitants ===
- Annsville (town)
- Augusta (town)
- Boonville (town)
- Boonville (village)
- Bridgewater (town)
- Camden (town)
- Camden (village)
- Chadwicks (census-designated place)
- Clark Mills (census-designated place)
- Clinton (village)
- Columbia (town)
- Danube (town)
- Deerfield (town)
- Dolgeville (village; partial)
- Fairfield (town)
- Florence (town)
- Floyd (town)
- Forestport (town)
- Frankfort (village)
- Litchfield (town)
- Little Falls (city)
- Little Falls (town)
- Manheim (town)
- Marshall (town)
- Mohawk (village)
- New Hartford (village)
- New York Mills (village)
- Newport (town)
- Oriskany (village)
- Paris (town)
- Remsen (town)
- Russia (town)
- Salisbury (town)
- Sangerfield (town)
- Schuyler (town)
- Sherrill (city)
- Steuben (town)
- Sylvan Beach (village)
- Trenton (town)
- Vernon (village)
- Warren (town)
- Waterville (village)
- Webb (town)
- Western (town)
- Whitesboro (village)
- Winfield (town)
- Yorkville (village)

=== Places with less than 1,000 inhabitants ===
- Ava (town)
- Barneveld (village)
- Bridgewater (village)
- Clayville (village)
- Cold Brook (village)
- Holland Patent (village)
- Middleville (village)
- Newport (village)
- Norway (town)
- Ohio (town)
- Oneida Castle (village)
- Oriskany Falls (village)
- Poland (village)
- Prospect (village)
- Remsen (village)
- Stark (town)
- West Winfield (village)

=== Hamlets ===
- Jordanville
- McConnellsville
- Old Forge
- Sauquoit
- Thendara

== Demographics ==
As of the census of 2020, there were 299,896 people residing within the MSA. The racial makeup of the MSA was 82.2% White, 5.8% African American, 0.3% Native American, 3.8% Asian, 0.1%< Pacific Islander, 2.2% from other races, and 5.7% from two or more races. Hispanic or Latino of any race were 5.7% of the population.

In 2000, the median income for a household in the MSA was $34,417, and the median income for a family was $42,956. Males had a median income of $31,051 versus $22,907 for females. The per capita income for the MSA was $17,329.

County	Seat	2025 estimate	2020 census	Change	Land area	Density
Oneida	Utica	226,392	232,125	−2.47%	456 sq mi (1,180 km^{2})	187/sq mi (72/km^{2})
Herkimer	Herkimer	59,219	60,139	−1.53%	490 sq mi (1,300 km^{2})	42/sq mi (16/km^{2})
Total		285,611	292,264	−2.28%	2,623 sq mi (6,794 km^{2})	109/sq mi (42/km^{2})

== Colleges and universities ==
- Herkimer County
  - Herkimer County Community College, in Herkimer
- Oneida County
  - Hamilton College, in Clinton
  - Mohawk Valley Community College, in Rome and Utica
  - State University of New York Polytechnic Institute, in Marcy
  - In Utica:
    - Empire State University
    - St. Elizabeth College of Nursing
    - Utica University

== See also ==
- New York census statistical areas
