= New York State Route 168 =

State highway in Herkimer County, New York, US

New York State Route 168
- Map of Herkimer County in eastern New York with NY 168 highlighted in red

Route information
- Maintained by NYSDOT
- Length: 14.32 mi (23.05 km)
- Existed: 1930–present

Major junctions
- West end: NY 28 in Mohawk
- East end: NY 80 in Stark

Location
- Country: United States
- State: New York
- Counties: Herkimer

Highway system
- New York Highways; Interstate; US; State; Reference; Parkways
← NY 167	→ NY 169

New York State Route 168 (NY 168) is an east–west state highway in southern Herkimer County, New York, in the United States. The highway runs for 14.32 miles (23.05 km) through a largely rural area of Upstate New York, from an intersection with NY 28 in the village of Mohawk to a junction with NY 80 in Stark. Along the way, it intersects one state highway and crosses multiple creeks. The route was originally designated as part of Route 5, an unsigned legislative route, in 1908 and as part of the signed NY 28 in 1924. In the 1930 renumbering of state highways in New York, NY 28 was realigned to follow a new alignment to the west while its former routing between Mohawk and Paines Hollow became NY 168. The route was extended eastward to its current terminus at NY 80 c. 1932.

== Route description ==
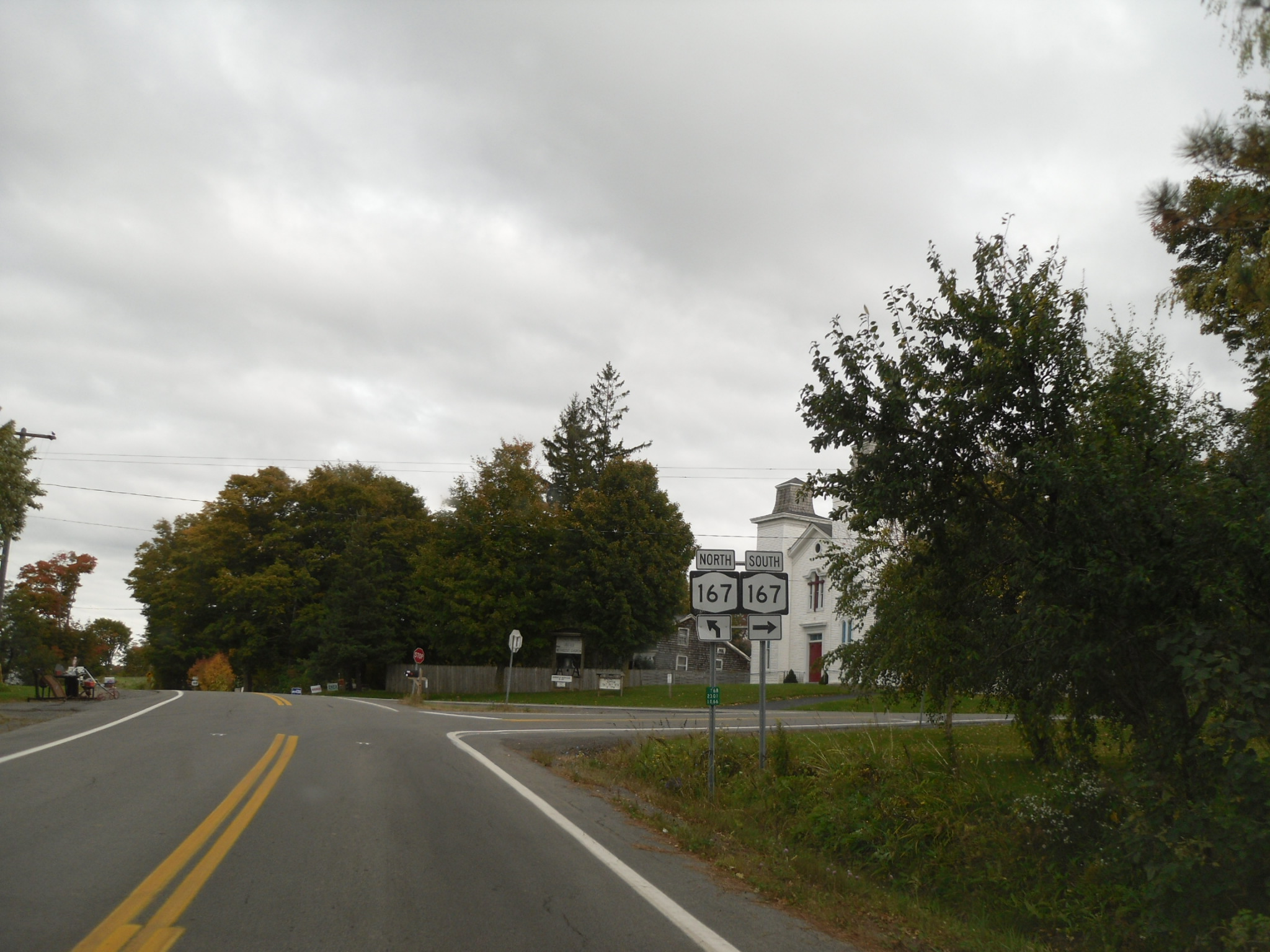
NY 168 east at the junction with NY 167 in Paines Hollow

NY 168 begins at a fork from NY 28 (Columbia Street) in the village of Mohawk. NY 168 immediately proceeds southward into the town of German Flatts, crossing through a small residential area as a two-lane roadway. Winding alongside Fulmer Creek, the route is going to pass through the dense wilderness of German Flatts, crossing past several residences hidden in the woods. NY 168 leaves the dense wilderness, winding southwest past Casey Road and crossing over Fulmer Creek several times. The route does not change scenery much in the first several miles, crossing an intersection with the northern terminus of Rock Hill Road (unsigned County Route 135) in the Days Rock hamlet of the town of German Flatts.

NY 168 bends eastward along Fulmer Creek, crossing through the mix of wilderness and residences. The route crosses through the hamlet of Edicks and an intersection with Heath Road. The route becomes much more residential through German Flatts, passing numerous residences and an intersection with Vrooman Road (CR 68). After CR 68, NY 168 winds southeast alongside the creek once again. After another bend, now to the east, NY 168 enters the town of Little Falls and the hamlet of Paines Hollow, a small residential community where it intersects with NY 167. After NY 167, the route continues east through the town of Little Falls, bending southeast past multiple farms and into the town of Stark.

In Stark, NY 168 crosses southeast into the hamlet of Deck, a residential hamlet near the junction with Upper Deck Road (CR 189). After CR 189, NY 168 turns eastward along a rural two-lane road through Stark, soon intersecting with Travis Road (CR 160). Paralleling several power lines, the route winds southeast through the dense wilderness of Stark, soon crossing several local farms. A short eastbound portion of NY 168 appears near the intersection with Fiery Hill Road (CR 178), until turning southeast again at a fork from Lighthall Road (CR 206). Continuing southeast, the dense wilderness returns until entering the hamlet of Starkville, where NY 168 intersects with NY 80. This intersection serves as the eastern terminus of NY 168.

== History ==
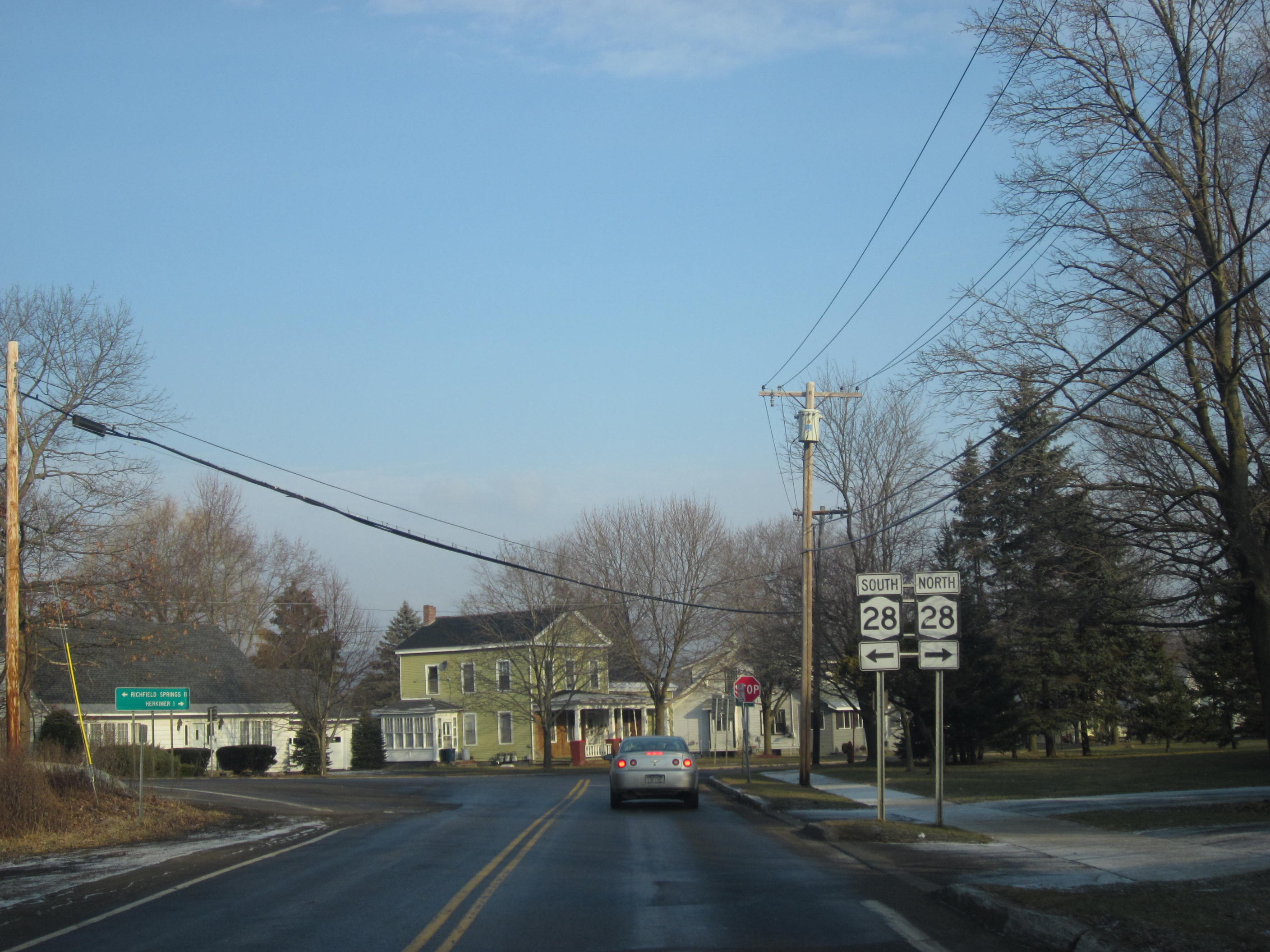
NY 168 westbound approaching the junction with NY 28 in Mohawk

The highway connecting Mohawk to Paines Hollow was originally designated as part of Route 5, an unsigned legislative route, by the New York State Legislature in 1908. It was improved to state highway standards by way of two separate projects assigned and completed during the 1910s. The first contract, awarded on September 30, 1915, covered the 6.55-mile (10.54 km) portion of the road from the Mohawk village line to the current intersection with NY 167 in Paines Hollow. The second contract, let on December 14, 1916, called for the improvement of the section of modern NY 168 within the village of Mohawk and what is now NY 28 between NY 168 and West Main Street (old NY 5S), a total distance of 0.71 miles (1.14 km).

Construction on the Mohawk–Paines Hollow segment cost about $127,000 (equivalent to $2.3 million in 2024), and required 62,000 square yards (51,840 m^{2}) of pavement while the latter project cost $38,000 (equivalent to $794,385 in 2024) to complete. The highway improved by the second project was added to the state highway system as State Highway 5631 (SH 5631) on May 3, 1918, and the Mohawk–Paines Hollow road was added as SH 5579 on May 31, 1919. When the first set of posted routes in New York were assigned in 1924, the section of legislative Route 5 between Mohawk and Paines Hollow became part of NY 28. In the 1930 renumbering of state highways in New York, NY 28 was realigned to use its modern alignment between Cooperstown and Mohawk while its former routing from Mohawk to Paines Hollow was redesignated as NY 168. The route was extended eastward to NY 80 in Starkville c. 1932.

== Major intersections ==
The entire route is in Herkimer County.

Location	mi	km	Destinations	Notes
Mohawk	0.00	0.00	NY 28 (Columbia Street) – Richfield Springs, Herkimer	Western terminus
Town of Little Falls	6.64	10.69	NY 167 – Little Falls, Richfield Springs	Hamlet of Paines Hollow
Stark	14.32	23.05	NY 80	Eastern terminus; hamlet of Starkville
1.000 mi = 1.609 km; 1.000 km = 0.621 mi
