= New York State Route 167 =

Highway in New York

New York State Route 167
- NY 167 highlighted in red

Route information
- Maintained by NYSDOT, the city of Little Falls, and the town of Little Falls
- Length: 26.17 mi (42.12 km)
- Existed: 1930–present

Major junctions
- South end: US 20 in Richfield Springs
- NY 5 / NY 169 in Little Falls
- North end: NY 29 in Dolgeville

Location
- Country: United States
- State: New York
- Counties: Otsego, Herkimer

Highway system
- New York Highways; Interstate; US; State; Reference; Parkways
← NY 166	→ NY 168

New York State Route 167 (NY 167) is a north–south state highway in the Mohawk Valley region of New York in the United States. It extends for 26.17 miles (42.12 km) from an intersection with U.S. Route 20 (US 20) in the Otsego County village of Richfield Springs to a junction with NY 29 in the Herkimer County village of Dolgeville. Midway between the two endpoints, NY 167 passes through the city of Little Falls, where it meets NY 5 and indirectly connects to the New York State Thruway by way of NY 169. Most of NY 167 is a two-lane rural highway; however, in Little Falls, NY 167 ranges in width from two to four lanes as it serves commercial and industrial sections of the city.

The piece of NY 167 between Richfield Springs and Paines Hollow, New York a small hamlet southwest of Little Falls, was originally part of an unsigned legislative route in the early 20th century. Farther north, the segment between Little Falls and Dolgeville was added to the legislative route system in 1910. In 1924, the Richfield Springs–Paines Hollow route became part of NY 28; however, that route was altered as part of the 1930 renumbering of state highways in New York to follow a new alignment to the west. NY 28's former routing between Richfield Springs and Paines Hollow became part of the new NY 167, which continued north through Little Falls to Dolgeville as it does today.

== Route description ==
=== Richfield Springs to Little Falls ===
NY 167 begins at an intersection with US 20 (West Main Street) near the northern tip of Canadarago Lake in the village of Richfield Springs. The route proceeds north as a two-lane highway along Church Street, passing through the village's residential northern portion before leaving Richfield Springs and crossing the Otsego–Herkimer county line just a half-mile (0.8 km) from the junction with US 20. The residential surroundings follow NY 167 into the town of Warren; however, they give way to more open, undeveloped areas as the route intersects Millstone Road (County Route 78 or CR 78, an unsigned number) about a half-mile (0.8 km) from the county line. From Millstone Road, the route winds northeast through Warren, traveling through increasingly rural areas as it serves the hamlet of Cullen and intersects Cullen and Hogsback roads (CR 183) in the center of the small community.

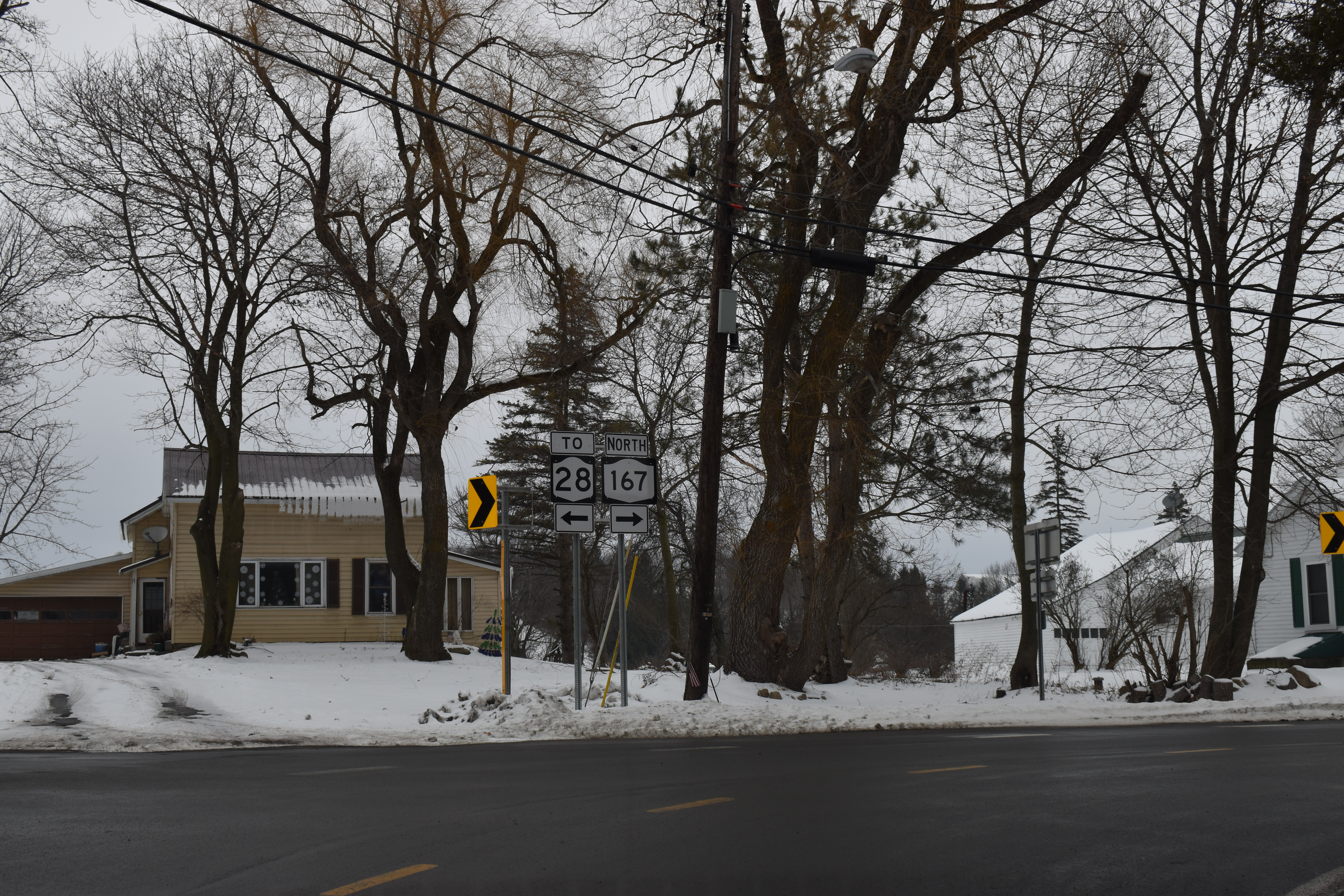
NY 167 in Jordanville

Past Cullen, NY 167 makes a gradual bend to the northeast, passing by a series of farms on its way to the hamlet of Jordanville. Here, the highway intersects with Jordanville Road (CR 18), an east–west two-lane road that NY 167 briefly follows as it runs through the community. A short distance east of Jordanville, NY 167 splits from Jordanville Road to head northeast as a two-lane rural road. It intersects with country roads, such as Rock Hill Road (CR 135) and Robinson Road (CR 46) For the next 4 miles (6.4 km), the route meanders across Warren, following an erratic northeasterly course across largely undeveloped areas to reach the rural hamlet of Paines Hollow, located at the junction of NY 167 and NY 168.

After leaving Paines Hollow, NY 167 continues northeast into the town of Little Falls. The route remains rural through the town, intersecting with Johnny Cake and Oregon roads (CR 136 and CR 120, respectively) as it winds to the northeast. Just under 2 miles (3.2 km) from Paines Hollow, the highway briefly curves to the southeast ahead of a hairpin turn that leads northward to a junction with Newville Road (CR 45).

=== Little Falls to Dolgeville ===
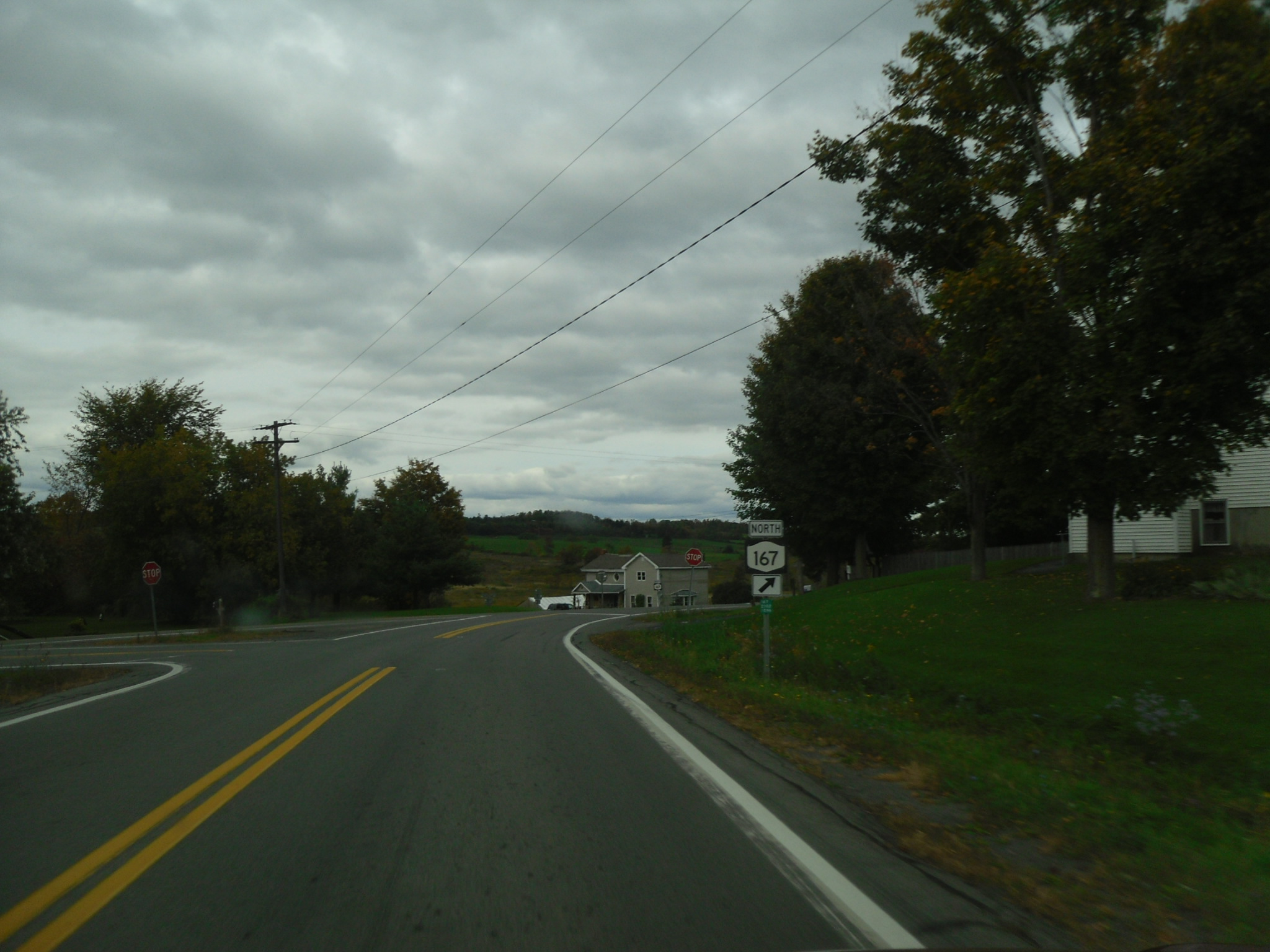
NY 167 northbound at the junction with NY 168 in Paines Hollow

NY 167 heads generally northward through Little Falls, veering to the east and west at various points as it traverses the town. About 3 miles (4.8 km) south of the city of Little Falls, the highway passes under the New York State Thruway (Interstate 90 or I-90) with no connection to the road. After the Thruway overpass, NY 167 heads into a residential area surrounding its junction with NY 5S. The two routes briefly overlap before NY 167 turns north into a less populated, mostly wooded area along the southern bank of the Mohawk River (here part of the Erie Canal). NY 167 follows the river into an industrial section of the city of Little Falls, where it becomes Overhead Street and soon crosses the Mohawk via the Overhead Street Bridge.

North of the river, the highway passes over NY 5 before intersecting Albany Street just west of downtown Little Falls. Albany Street is the eastbound half of a one-way couplet with nearby Main Street; as a result, the two directions of NY 167 split to follow different alignments through western Little Falls. From Overhead Street, northbound NY 167 turns east to follow Albany Street for two blocks to Little Falls' commercial center, where it intersects with southbound NY 169 at South Ann Street. NY 169 turns east here to follow Albany Street while NY 167 heads south along the two-way South Ann Street for one block to reach NY 5, a four-lane divided highway on the north bank of the Mohawk River. At this point, NY 167 northbound reconnects to the southbound route, which follows NY 5 west from South Ann Street to NY 5's junction with the west end of Albany Street.

East of South Ann Street, both directions of NY 167 overlap with NY 5, following the four-lane road along the southern edge of downtown to a junction with East Main Street on the city's east side. NY 167 reconnects with NY 169 here, which leaves East Main Street to briefly follow NY 5 and NY 167 along the riverside arterial. The resulting overlap between NY 167 and NY 169 is a wrong-way concurrency, with NY 169 southbound overlapping NY 167 northbound and vice versa. NY 169 splits from the highway after just one block to proceed south across the Mohawk River while NY 5 and NY 167 remain concurrent to the eastern edge of the city. Here, NY 167 forks from NY 5, running east as a two-lane street through the undeveloped eastern fringe of Little Falls. The highway rises in elevation as it heads out of the Mohawk River valley and passes into the adjacent town of Manheim.

Now known as Dolgeville Road, NY 167 heads northeastward through dense forests to the hamlet of Manheim Center, a small residential community 3 miles (4.8 km) from Little Falls. Here, the route connects to Dockey Road (CR 42). After leaving Manheim Center, the route becomes rural again, heading northward for several miles past farms, power lines, and the terminus of Snells Bush Road (CR 23). North of Snells Bush Road, NY 167 trends to the northeast, loosely paralleling East Canada Creek as it heads toward the village of Dolgeville as South Main Street. The rural areas along the route gradually give way to homes, which in turn lead to Dolgeville's central business district. In the center of Dolgeville, NY 167 runs alongside the creek for several blocks before ending at an intersection with NY 29 (State Street).

== History ==
Two sections of what is now NY 167 were included as part of legislative routes when the New York State Legislature created a statewide legislative route system in 1908. From Richfield Springs to Paines Hollow, it was designated as part of Route 5, which continued southeast to Kingston via Oneonta and northwest to Mohawk. The section of what is now NY 167 north of Little Falls became part of Route 26, which ran from Little Falls to Remsen via Dolgeville. In 1910, Route 26 was realigned to follow a more direct routing between Little Falls and Remsen via Middleville and Poland. The former alignment of Route 26 between Little Falls and Dolgeville went unnumbered until March 1, 1921, when it became part of Route 37, which was extended southwestward from Dolgeville to Little Falls.

The alignment of NY 167 follows the Paine's Hollow Road, constructed between Little Falls and Paines Hollow. This new road would shorten time between the two communities through Herkimer County. The Paine's Hollow Road opened on October 4, 1921, opening a new road through the dairy country of the Mohawk Valley. The new road had branch alignments toward Oneonta, Cooperstown and Richfield Springs. At 1 p.m. (1800 UTC) that day, a convoy of vehicles drove the route south from Little Falls, with a band on a large truck and a coach with six horses. When the group reached Paines Hollow, a ceremony was held, led by the president of the Little Falls Chamber of Commerce and H.P. Snyder, the local legislator for Herkimer County. The new section between Paines Hollow and Jordanville cost $123,136.25 (equivalent to $2.17 million in 2024) and was designated as State Highway 1363.

When the first set of posted routes in New York were assigned in 1924, most of legislative Route 5 north of Oneonta—including the section between Richfield Springs and Mohawk—became part of NY 28, which originally began in Oneonta and headed north through Richfield Springs and Mohawk before ending in Utica. In the 1930 renumbering of state highways in New York, the section of NY 28 between Richfield Springs and Mohawk was moved onto a new highway to the west that went directly between the two locations. The portion of its former routing between Richfield Springs and Paines Hollow became part of the new NY 167, which continued north from Paines Hollow to Dolgeville via Little Falls and old legislative Route 37.

=== Realignments ===
In June 2003, a project began to replace the bridge that carries NY 167 across the Erie Canal, Moss Island, Mohawk River, CSX Railroad, and NY 5 in Little Falls. On September 15, 2005, the new $17.4 million (equivalent to $29.7 million in 2024) bridge opened and replaced two deteriorated structures that were built in two phases from 1936 to 1962. The new bridge also eliminated a dangerous at-grade crossing at the CSX Railroad where low profile vehicles frequently got stuck. The bridge was dedicated to Dr. Bernard J. Burke, a local physician remembered for his total dedication to his patients and the community for over 35 years. The Lancaster Construction Company of Richmondville was the contractor of this project.

== Major intersections ==
County	Location	mi	km	Destinations	Notes
Otsego	Richfield Springs	0.00	0.00	US 20 (West Main Street) – Cherry Valley, West Winfield	Southern terminus
Herkimer	Warren	5.25	8.45	To NY 28 via Jordanville Road (CR 18)	Hamlet of Jordanville
Herkimer	Town of Little Falls	10.03	16.14	NY 168 – Mohawk, Starkville	Hamlet of Paines Hollow
Herkimer	Town of Little Falls	15.68	25.23	NY 5S east to I-90 / New York Thruway east – Fort Plain	Eastern terminus of NY 5S / NY 167 overlap
Herkimer	Town of Little Falls	15.73	25.31	NY 5S west to I-90 / New York Thruway west – Mohawk	Western terminus of NY 5S / NY 167 overlap
Herkimer	City of Little Falls	17.97	28.92	NY 5 west	Western terminus of NY 5 / NY 167 overlap
Herkimer	City of Little Falls	18.42	29.64	NY 169 north (East Main Street)	Western terminus of NY 167 / NY 169 overlap
Herkimer	City of Little Falls	18.64	30.00	NY 169 south to I-90 / New York Thruway	Eastern terminus of NY 167 / NY 169 overlap
Herkimer	City of Little Falls	19.04	30.64	NY 5 east – St. Johnsville	Eastern terminus of NY 5 / NY 167 overlap
Herkimer	Dolgeville	26.17	42.12	NY 29 (State Street)	Northern terminus
1.000 mi = 1.609 km; 1.000 km = 0.621 mi: Concurrency terminus
