= List of New York State Historic Markers in Herkimer County, New York =

This is an incomplete list of New York State Historic Markers in Herkimer County, New York.

== Listings county-wide ==
	Marker name	Image	Date designated	Location	City or Town	Coords	Marker text
1	MASONIC LODGE			On County Rd. About 2 Mis. W. Of Orendorf Corners	Columbia, Town Of, New York		Built By D.v.w. Golden 1812 For Warren Lodge No. 155 Organized March 4, 1807 Ceased Paying Dues 1818.
2	ORENDORF BARN			On Nys 28 About 1/2 Mi. N. Of Orendorf Corners	Columbia, Town Of, New York		First Building Where Religious Service Was Held Bodies Were Buried Until 1803 At Northeast Corner
3	PETRIE'S CORNERS			At Intersection County Rds. At Columbia Center	Columbia, Town Of, New York		On Route Of Scout Adam F. Helmer's Famous Fun To Warn Settlers Of German Flatts Of Approach Of Brant's Indians September 17, 1778
4	PIONEER HOME			At Intersection Of County Rds. At Columbia Center	Columbia, Town Of, New York		Of Col. Jacob D. Petrie, Who With Six Sons Founded Petrie's Corners
5	REFORMED PROTESTANT DUTCH			On County Rd. About 1 Mi. W. Of Orendorf Corners	Columbia, Town Of, New York		Church, Organized July 8, 1798. Cemetery Dedicated 1803. Has 20 Revolutionary Veterans And 22 Soldiers Of War Of 1812
6	SITE OF			On Town Rd. At Millers Mills	Columbia, Town Of, New York		Pioneer Home Of Andrew Miller & 6 Sons Who Founded Miller's Mills About 1790. Built Sawmill And Gristmill.
7	SITE OF			On County Rd. About 1½ Mis. W. Of Orendorf Corners	Columbia, Town Of, New York		First Store And House Built By David V.w. Golden Before 1798, Who Was First Judge Of Court Held At Whitestown.
8	FT. HENDRICK			On Nys 5 At Leroy Village Line	Danube, Town Of, New York		1754–1760 British Post Guarding Mohawk Castle. Named For King Hendrick Killed At Lake George, Sept. 1755
9	FOLTS HOMESTEAD			On Nys 5S At Ilion	Frankfort, Town Of, New York		Erected 1796 By Major Warner Folts Who Served In War Of 1812 At Sackets Harbor; Member Of Assembly 1823–24. House Occupied Since By His Descendants
10	OLD REMINGTON HOMESTEAD			On County Rd. About 4 Mis. S.w. Of Ilion	Frankfort, Town Of, New York		Built In 1799 By Eliphalet Remington Who Forged The First Remington Gun; Birthplace Of Philo Remington
11	F.E. SPINNER HOME			On Nys 5S & Nys 28 At Mohawk	German Flatts, Town Of, New York		Herkimer Co. Sheriff 1834 Member Of Congress 1854–1860 Appointed Treasurer Of The United States By Lincoln Served 1861–1875
12	MOHAWK'S FIRST			On Nys 28 At Mohawk	German Flatts, Town Of, New York		Public School Built In 1809 On This Site. Used As A School Until 1853. Served As A Church For Five Years. House Now Stands In Rear
13	SHOEMAKER TAVERN			On Nys 5S At Mohawk	German Flatts, Town Of, New York		Built Before The Revolution Gen. Washington Had Dinner Here Under Tree On His Valley Tour In 1783. Walter Butler Captured Here; Later Escaped Albany Jail
14	TRAIL OF SCOUT			On Nys 5S At Mohawk	German Flatts, Town Of, New York		Adam F. Helmer Entering Mohawk Valley To Warn German Flatts Of Approach Of Brant's Indians, Sept. 17, 1778
15	BIRTHPLACE OF			On Tn. Rd. At Jerusalem Hill	Litchfield, Town Of, New York		John Curtis Underwood 1809–1873 U.s. District Judge Of Virginia. Appointed By Pres. Lincoln 1863
16	BIRTHPLACE OF			On Tn. Rd. About 1/2 Mi. N. Of Cranes Corners	Litchfield, Town Of, New York		Charles F. Wheelock 1849–1928 School Teacher And Educator For Half Century
17	FURNACE SITE			On Co. Rd. About 1 Mi. S. Of Gulph	Litchfield, Town Of, New York		Of Litchfield Iron Mfg. Co. Incorporated 1813 Makers Of Pig Iron And Various Kinds Of Iron Hollow Ware
18	HOME SITE OF			On Tn. Rd. About 1 Mi. N. Of Cranes Corners	Litchfield, Town Of, New York		Elijah Snow Who Settled Here In 1786 Locality Then Called Snow's Bush Now Litchfield
19	JERUSALEM			On Town Rd. At Jerusalem Hill	Litchfield, Town Of, New York		Hill Cemetery Oldest Burial Ground In Town Of Litchfield First Interment In 1791
20	OLIVE BRANCH LODGE			On Co. Rd. At Cranes Corners	Litchfield, Town Of, New York		No. 40, F. And A.m. First Meeting On This Site July 16, 1812. Dewitt Clinton Was Grand Master At The Time
21	SITE OF			On County Rd. About 4 Mis. S.w. Of Ilion	Litchfield, Town Of, New York		Avery Homestead Purchased In 1819 By John Stanton Avery, One Of The Earlier Settlers In Litchfield. Home Destroyed By Fire In 1934.
22	SITE OF HOME OF			On Co. Rd. About 2 Mis. S. Of Gulph	Litchfield, Town Of, New York		Nathaniel Ball Where The First Baptist Church In Litchfield Was Organized March 15, 1795
26	OCTAGONAL HOUSE		1932	On Nys 28 At Newport	Newport, Town Of, New York		Built About 1850 By Linus Yale Inventor Of The Yale Lock
27	THE YALE LOCK		1932	On Nys 28 At Newport	Newport, Town Of, New York		Was First Made By Linus Yale In A Shop On This Site 1847
23	A RAIDING FORCE LED BY			On Co. Rd. About 3 Mis. S.e. Of Gray	Norway, Town Of, New York		Major Ross & Walter Butler Was Here Attacked By Co. Marinus Willet's Patriot Soldiers October 30, 1781
24	IN THIS CEMETERY ARE THE			On County Rd. At Norway	Norway, Town Of, New York		Graves Of Soldiers Of The Four Wars French-Indian, Revolution, War Of 1812, Civil War
25	WOOD HOME			On County Rd. About 4 Mis. E., Gray	Ohio, Town Of, New York		Wheelock Wood (1894–1887) Wife, Hannah Southwick Comstock (1797–1892) Of Mass. Located Here In 1829 And Built This House.
28	EAST OF THIS POINT			On County Rd. About 2 Mis. N. Of East Schuyler	Schuyler, Town Of, New York		Of Bridenbecker Creek John Finster Built The First Sawmill Operated Successfully In Town Of Schuyler
29	FIRST CHURCH			On County Rd. About 3 Mis. N. Of East Schuyler	Schuyler, Town Of, New York		School House In Town Of Schuyler Built Here In 1809
30	FIRST PUBLIC			On County Rd. About 2½ Mis. N. Of East Schuyler	Schuyler, Town Of, New York		Burying Ground 1766–1840 In Town Of Schuyler Was Located On This Flat
31	NEW PETERSBURGH			On Nys 5 About 3 Mis. West Of North Ilion	Schuyler, Town Of, New York		Fort A Stockade Built And Used By The Pioneers Of Schuyler Prior To And During The American Revolution
32	SITE OF HOME			On Nys 5 About 4 Mis. East Of West Schuyler	Schuyler, Town Of, New York		Heinrich Staring B. 1730 - D. 1808 Captain 4Th Regiment Tryon County Militia And 1St Judge Of Court Of Common Pleas Of Herkimer County
33	HENDERSON HOUSE			On County Rd. About 4 Mis. N. Of Jordanville	Warren, Town Of, New York		Former Cruger Mansion Grant 1739 Frame House Built 1787 Stone House Built 1832
34	JOHN TUNNICLIFF, JR.			On Us 20 At Warren	Warren, Town Of, New York		B. 1751, Derby, England, Came To America 1772; Revolutionary Soldier; Settled Here 1793; Died 1814; Buried One Mile South, Tunnicliff Cemetery.
35	MARSHALL CEMETERY			On Us 20 At Warren	Warren, Town Of, New York		[Arrow] 1/2 Mile John Marshall, 1764–1863 Revolutionary Soldier; With Washington At Yorktown; Witnessed Surrender Of Cornwallis.
36	SITE OF			On County Rd. About 2 Mis. S. Of Henderson	Warren, Town Of, New York		Paul Crim House Paul Crim Came From Germany About 1757. One Of Founders Of Andrustown. House Burned At Andrustown Massacre.
37	SITE OF HOME OF FREDERICK			On Town Rd. About 1/2 Mi. N. Of Cranes Corners	Warren, Town Of, New York		Bell, Federick, Jr. And Wife Dorothy Crim Father And Son Massacred Frederick Bell Iii Stolen By Indians—July 18, 1778

== See also ==
- List of New York State Historic Markers
- National Register of Historic Places listings in New York
- List of National Historic Landmarks in New York
