= New York State Route 169 =

State highway in Herkimer County, New York, US

New York State Route 169
- NY 169 highlighted in red

Route information
- Maintained by NYSDOT and the city of Little Falls
- Length: 12.42 mi (19.99 km)
- Existed: 1930–present

Major junctions
- South end: NY 5S in Danube
- NY 5 / NY 167 in Little Falls
- North end: NY 28 / NY 29 in Middleville

Location
- Country: United States
- State: New York
- Counties: Herkimer

Highway system
- New York Highways; Interstate; US; State; Reference; Parkways
← NY 168	→ NY 170

New York State Route 169 (NY 169) is a 12.42-mile-long (19.99 km) north–south state highway located within Herkimer County, New York, in the United States. It extends from an intersection with NY 5S in the town of Danube to a junction with NY 28 and NY 29 in the village of Middleville. The route connects the city of Little Falls to the New York State Thruway (Interstate 90 or I-90), which bypasses the city to the south. Outside of Little Falls, NY 169 is a two-lane highway that passes through sparsely developed areas.

In 1910, the portion of NY 169 between Little Falls and Middleville became part of Route 26, an unsigned legislative route created by the New York State Legislature. In the 1930 renumbering of state highways in New York, it became signed as NY 169 and originally extended from NY 5 in Little Falls to NY 28 and NY 29 in Middleville. It was then later extended southward in the late 1970s to connect to a new exit on the Thruway.

== Route description ==
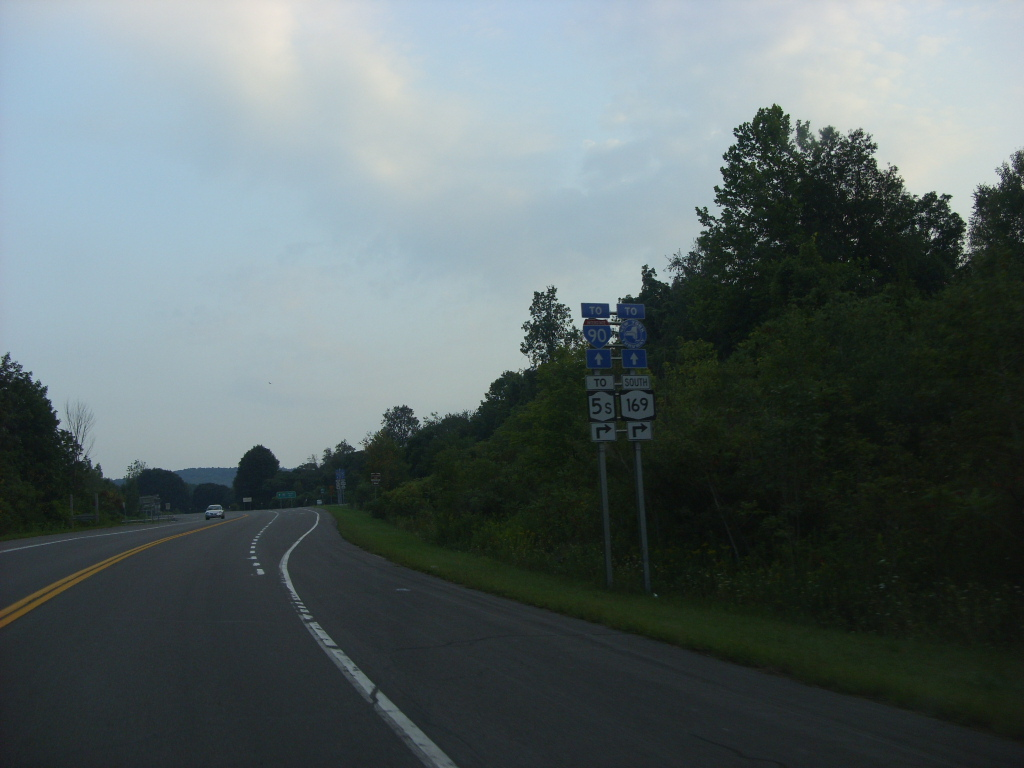
NY 169 approaching the Thruway and NY 5S

NY 169 begins a short distance north of New York State Thruway (I-90) exit 29A at an intersection with NY 5S in the town of Danube. It initially heads northward, paralleling a north–south roadway leading away from the exit that overpasses NY 5S. The two roads converge after 0.37 miles (0.60 km), directly connecting NY 169 to the Thruway. NY 169 continues on a northward course to just south of the Mohawk River, where it turns to the northwest and subsequently follows the river, through a wooded area that leads toward the city of Little Falls.

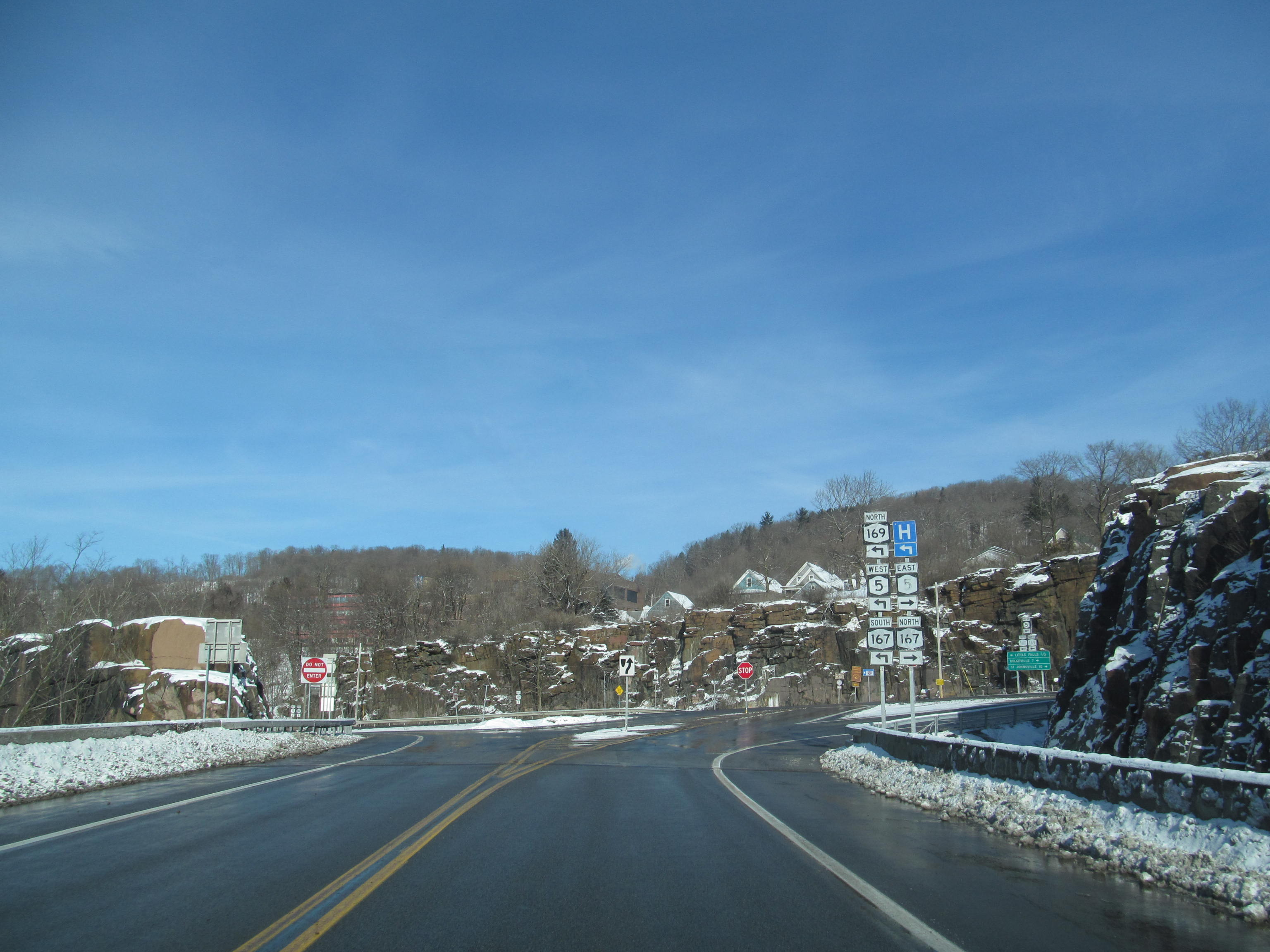
NY 169 northbound at junction with NY 5 and NY 167

As the route approaches Little Falls, it makes a slight turn to the north, crossing over the Mohawk River (here part of the Erie Canal) and the CSX Railroad, on its way to an intersection with a divided highway carrying NY 5 and NY 167. NY 169 turns west here, following the highway for 0.22 miles (0.35 km) toward Little Falls. The resulting overlap with NY 167 is a wrong-way concurrency as NY 169 northbound is concurrent to NY 167 southbound and vice versa. At East Main Street, NY 169 leaves NY 5 and NY 167 to follow East Main Street into the city. The street splits into a one-way couplet three blocks later, at which point southbound NY 169 is shifted one block south onto Albany Street.

The route follows the couplet for three blocks, passing through the city's central business district prior to intersecting Ann Street. Here, the two directions of NY 169 converge to follow Ann Street north into a more residential neighborhood. The junction of Albany Street and Ann Street also features northbound NY 167, which approaches the same intersection from the west along Albany Street and abuts NY 169 southbound as the latter route turns east on Albany Street from Ann Street. NY 169 follows Ann Street for four blocks (five southbound) to Monroe Street, where it intersects the southern terminus of NY 170.

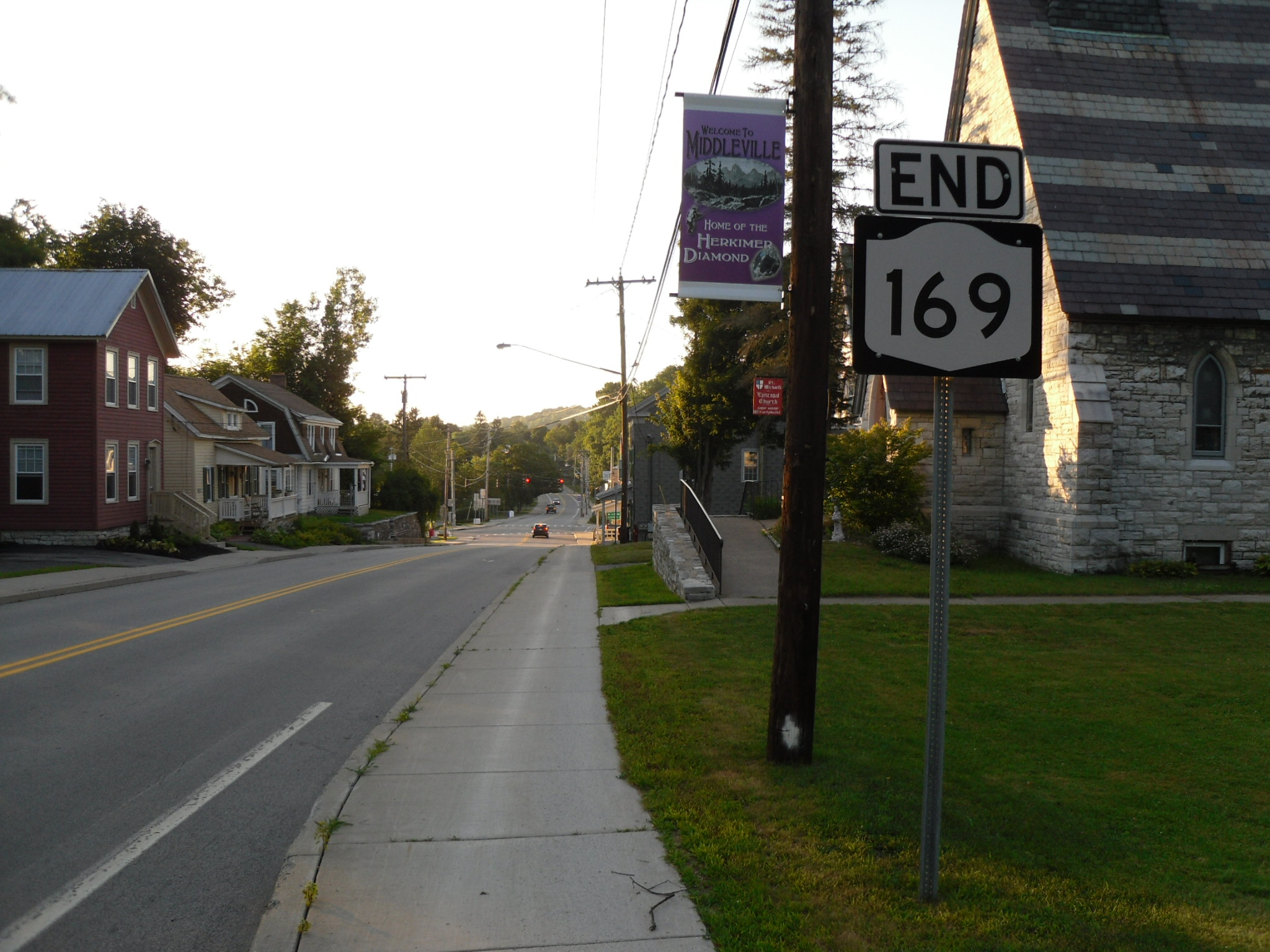
NY 169 at its terminus with NY 28 and NY 29 in Middleville

While East Monroe Street, located to the east of Ann Street, heads along the northern fringe of Little Falls as NY 170, West Monroe Street carries NY 169 northwestward past more homes and, eventually, out of the city limits. Now in the town of Little Falls, the route passes through mostly open areas while serving a small handful of isolated homes. It eventually crosses into the town of Fairfield, where it takes on a more northerly and more winding alignment. After 4.5 miles (7.2 km), the route reaches the village of Middleville, located eight miles (13 km) northwest of Little Falls. Within Middleville, NY 169 passes by a row of homes prior to ending at an intersection with NY 28 and the western terminus of NY 29.

== History ==
The portion of what is now NY 169 between the Little Falls city line and Middleville became part of a realigned Route 26, an unsigned legislative route, created by the New York State Legislature in 1910. Route 26 extended from Routes 5 and 6 in Mohawk, eastward to the city of Little Falls, then north to Trenton, via Middleville and Newport, where it intersected Route 25. NY 169 was not assigned a posted designation until the 1930 renumbering of state highways in New York when it was designated as NY 169, which originally began in downtown Little Falls at NY 5.

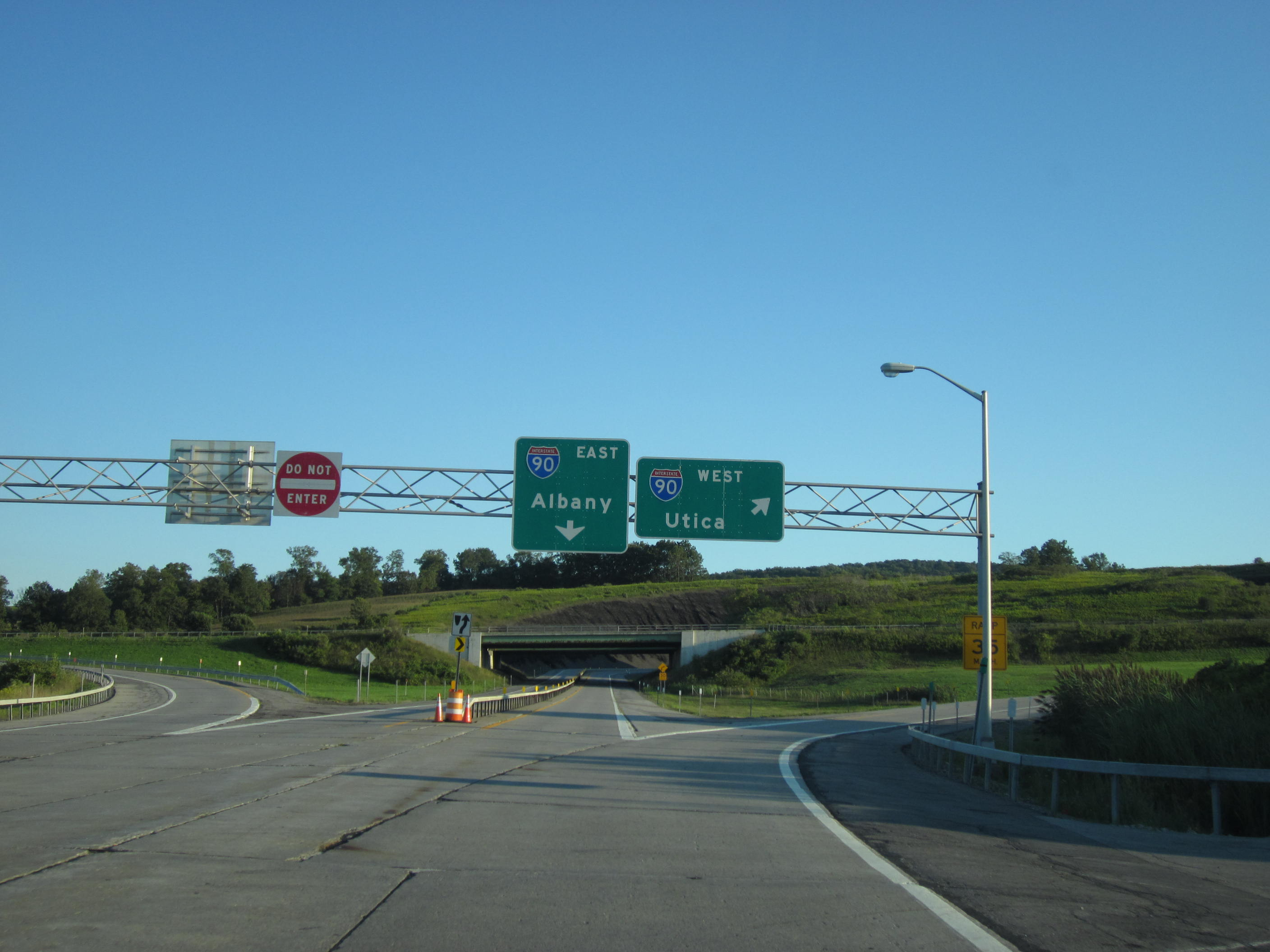
Thruway exit 29A

By December 1973, exit 29A on the Thruway was completed, along with new roadway leading from the exit to the south end of the Finks Basin Bridge. Then by December 1974, the NY 5 arterial was completed in Little Falls. At this time the only main connection between the Thruway and Little Falls was the Finks Basin Bridge, a one-way signalized bridge with a 15 ton limit. This caused trucks over 15 tons to detour 5.21 miles (8.38 km) along NY 5S and NY 167 to access Little Falls. Along NY 5S trucks had to climb a steep 7.2% grade for just over one mile (1.6 km) then descend 7% grade for .5 miles (0.80 km). Then by 1978, a new two-lane arterial highway was being built from NY 5 to the south side of the Finks Basin Bridge, where it intersected the previously built roadway linking to the Thruway. By 1981, the new roadway was completed and NY 169 was extended south to NY 5S and better accessed the new exit 29A on the New York State Thruway.

On August 4, 2006, a section of NY 169 was closed to traffic, .5 miles (0.80 km) north of the intersection with North Creek Road, due to a deficient culvert pipe. The new pipe, installed by Reale Construction Company, was installed and open to traffic on October 6, 2006. On April 9, 2010, the bridge that carries NY 169 over Stoney Creek was closed to traffic, to perform repairs. The bridge was reopened May, 2010.

== Major intersections ==
The entire route is in Herkimer County.

Location	mi	km	Destinations	Notes
Danube	0.00	0.00	NY 5S – Fort Plain, Mohawk	Southern terminus
Danube	0.37	0.60	To I-90 / New York Thruway – Albany, Utica	
City of Little Falls	2.31	3.72	NY 5 east / NY 167 north – Dolgeville, St. Johnsville	Southern terminus of NY 5 / NY 167 overlap
City of Little Falls	2.53	4.07	NY 5 west / NY 167 south	Northern terminus of NY 5 / NY 167 overlap
City of Little Falls			NY 167 north	No northbound access
City of Little Falls	3.28	5.28	NY 170 north (East Monroe Street)	Southern terminus of NY 170
Middleville	12.42	19.99	NY 28 / NY 29 east – Poland, Herkimer, Fairfield	Northern terminus; western terminus of NY 29
1.000 mi = 1.609 km; 1.000 km = 0.621 mi: Concurrency terminus; Electronic toll collection; Incomplete access
