= Lalino Stone Arch Bridge =

- U.S. National Register of Historic Places
- Location within New York Location within the United States
- Nearest city: Middleville, New York
- Coordinates: 43°8′14″N 74°56′42″W
- Area: less than one acre
- Built: 1870
- Architect: Todd, Charles & Eugene
- NRHP reference No.: 01001397
- Added to NRHP: December 28, 2001

Lalino Stone Arch Bridge is a historic stone arch bridge located near Middleville in Herkimer County, New York. It was constructed in 1870 and spans Perkosky brook a tributary of Maltanner Creek, which empties into West Canada Creek. It is 35 feet long and has a single arch with a span of 23 feet and rise of eight feet, six inches.

It was listed on the National Register of Historic Places in 2001.
