= Jacksonburg, New York =

- Hamlet
- Location within New York Location within the United States
- Coordinates: 43°00′51″N 74°54′55″W
- Country: United States
- State: New York
- County: Herkimer
- Town: Little Falls
- Elevation: 423 ft (129 m)
- Time zone: UTC-5 (Eastern (EST))
  - Summer (DST): UTC-4 (EDT)
- ZIP code: 13407
- Area code: 315

Jacksonburg or Jacksonburgh is a hamlet located on NY 5S, southwest of the city of Little Falls in Herkimer County, New York, United States. Erie Canal Lock 18 is located in Jacksonburg.
