= New York State Route 171 =

State highway in Herkimer County, New York, US

New York State Route 171
- Map of Herkimer and Oneida counties with NY 171 highlighted in red

Route information
- Maintained by NYSDOT and the village of Frankfort
- Length: 5.69 mi (9.16 km)
- Existed: 1930–present

Major junctions
- West end: CR 145 / CR 185 in Frankfort town
- East end: Main Street in Frankfort village

Location
- Country: United States
- State: New York
- Counties: Herkimer

Highway system
- New York Highways; Interstate; US; State; Reference; Parkways
← NY 170A	→ NY 172

New York State Route 171 (NY 171) is a state highway running east to west through Herkimer County, New York, in the United States. It connects the hamlet of Gulph in the town of Frankfort to the village of Frankfort by way of the Frankfort Gorge. Its western end is at the junction of County Route 145 (CR 145) and CR 185 southeast of Gulph. The eastern end is 5.69 miles (9.16 km) to the east at an intersection with Main Street in Frankfort village. NY 171 is a narrow, two-lane highway for its whole length.

NY 171 is the only signed state highway in New York that does not intersect any other signed New York state routes. However, this was not always the case. When it was originally assigned as part of the 1930 renumbering of state highways in New York, Main Street in Frankfort was part of NY 5S. A new freeway alignment for NY 5S was constructed between Utica and Ilion in the late 1960s, isolating NY 171 from the remainder of the state highway system. Frankfort's interchange with NY 5S is now at Cemetery Street, 0.75 miles (1.21 km) to the west.

== Route description ==
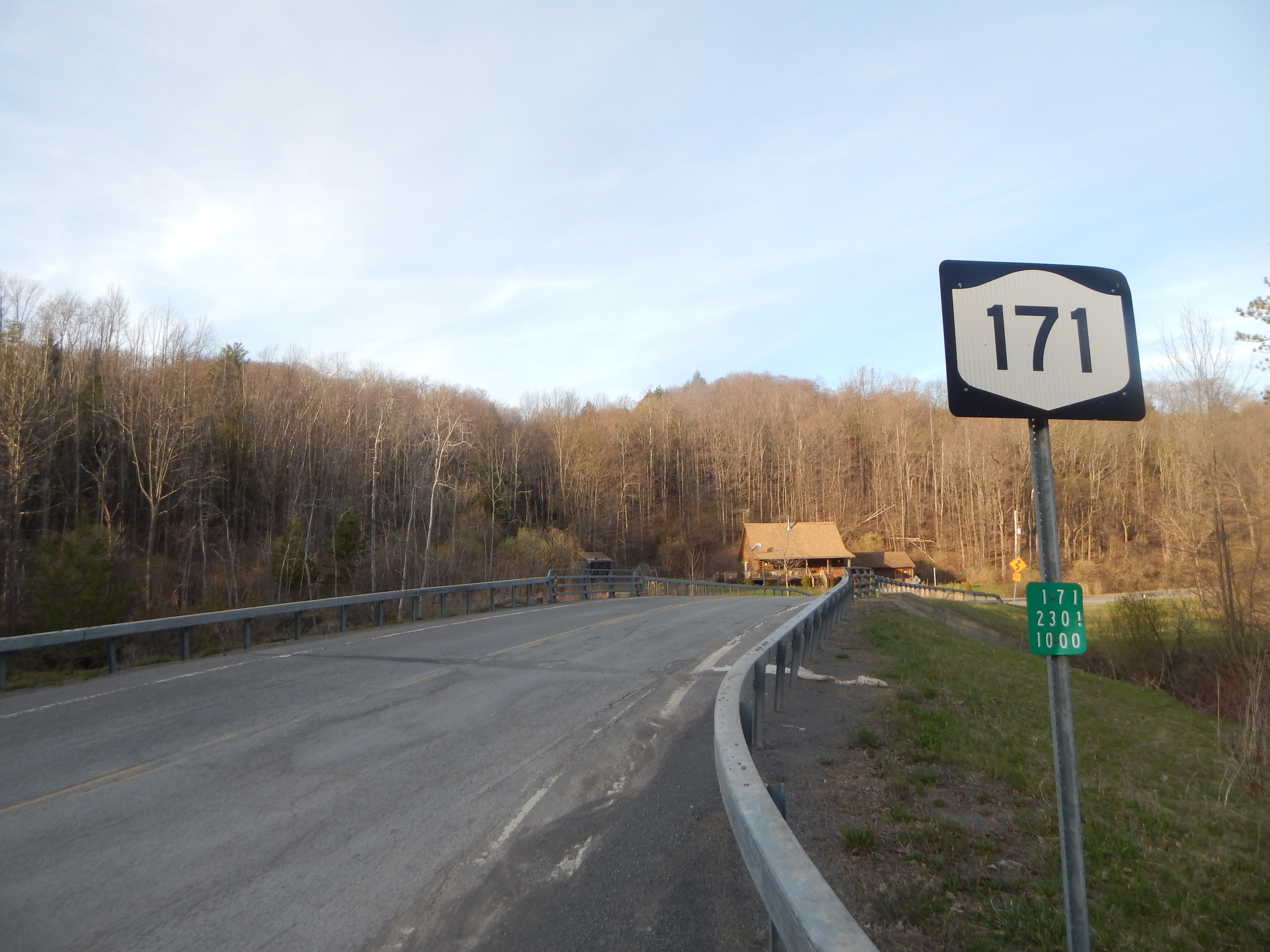
First reassurance and reference markers on NY 171 eastbound in Gulph

NY 171 begins at an intersection with CR 145 (Ball Road) and CR 185 (Gulph Road) southeast of the hamlet of Gulph. The route heads eastward, passing through a dense forest in the town of Frankfort. The forest surrounds NY 171 for a substantial distance, separating it from more developed areas of the town. The highway eventually turns to the northeast, following a winding, curve-filled route that leads through the Frankfort Gorge towards the village of Frankfort. As it heads through the valley, NY 171 intersects with CR 13, known locally as Furnace Road. CR 13 and NY 171 parallel for a short distance as CR 13 climbs the north face of the gorge and then turns northward at its top.

The route then passes under a series of power lines, loosely paralleling the more northerly CR 96 (Higby Road) to the outskirts of the village of Frankfort. Here, NY 171 intersects with several roads of local importance before crossing over the NY 5S freeway to enter the village itself. On the eastern side of the highway, NY 171 becomes South Litchfield Street and passes through areas that are mostly residential. It continues to the village's central business district. State maintenance of the route ends at a junction with Canal Street. but the route continues as a village-maintained highway for one more block to an intersection with Main Street.

== History ==
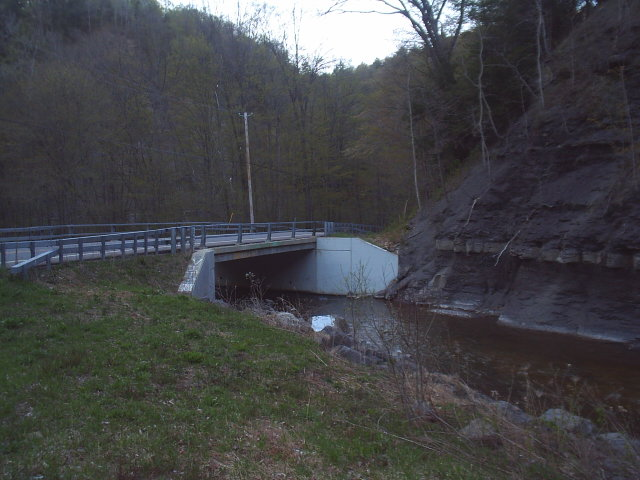
NY 171 crossing a bridge in Frankfort

Most of what is now NY 171 was improved to state highway standards as part of a project contracted out by the state of New York on July 12, 1916. The work covered the 5.10 miles (8.21 km) of the route outside of the Frankfort village limits. The reconstruction was completed in the 1920s, and the Frankfort Gorge road was added to the state highway system as unsigned State Highway 1346 (SH 1346) by 1926. In the 1930 renumbering of state highways in New York, SH 1346 became part of NY 171, which continued northeast to Main Street in Frankfort on several state and locally maintained streets. At the time, Main Street was part of NY 5S, another route assigned as part of the renumbering.

In the late 1960s, a limited-access highway was constructed between Utica and Ilion alongside NY 5S. The new highway became part of a rerouted NY 5S in the early 1970s. As a result, NY 171, which does not interchange with the highway, no longer connects to any other signed state routes. NY 171 is the only signed state highway in New York that is completely isolated from the remainder of the state highway system.

== Major intersections ==
The entire route is in Herkimer County.

Location	mi	km	Destinations	Notes
Town of Frankfort	0.00	0.00	Ball Road (CR 145) / Gulph Road (CR 185)	Western terminus; hamlet of Gulph
Village of Frankfort	5.69	9.16	Main Street	Eastern terminus; former routing of NY 5S
1.000 mi = 1.609 km; 1.000 km = 0.621 mi
