= New York State Route 170 =

State highway in Herkimer County, New York, US

New York State Route 170
- NY 170 in red, NY 170A in blue

Route information
- Maintained by NYSDOT and the city of Little Falls
- Length: 7.33 mi (11.80 km)
- Existed: 1930–present

Major junctions
- South end: NY 169 in Little Falls
- North end: NY 29 in Fairfield

Location
- Country: United States
- State: New York
- Counties: Herkimer

Highway system
- New York Highways; Interstate; US; State; Reference; Parkways
← NY 169	→ NY 171

New York State Route 170 (NY 170) is a 7.33-mile-long (11.80 km) north–south state highway in Herkimer County, New York, in the United States. It runs from NY 169 in the city of Little Falls to NY 29 in the town of Fairfield. It has only one other junction with a signed state highway, that being NY 170A, its spur route in the town of Fairfield. NY 170 was assigned as part of the 1930 renumbering of state highways in New York and has not been altered since.

== Route description ==
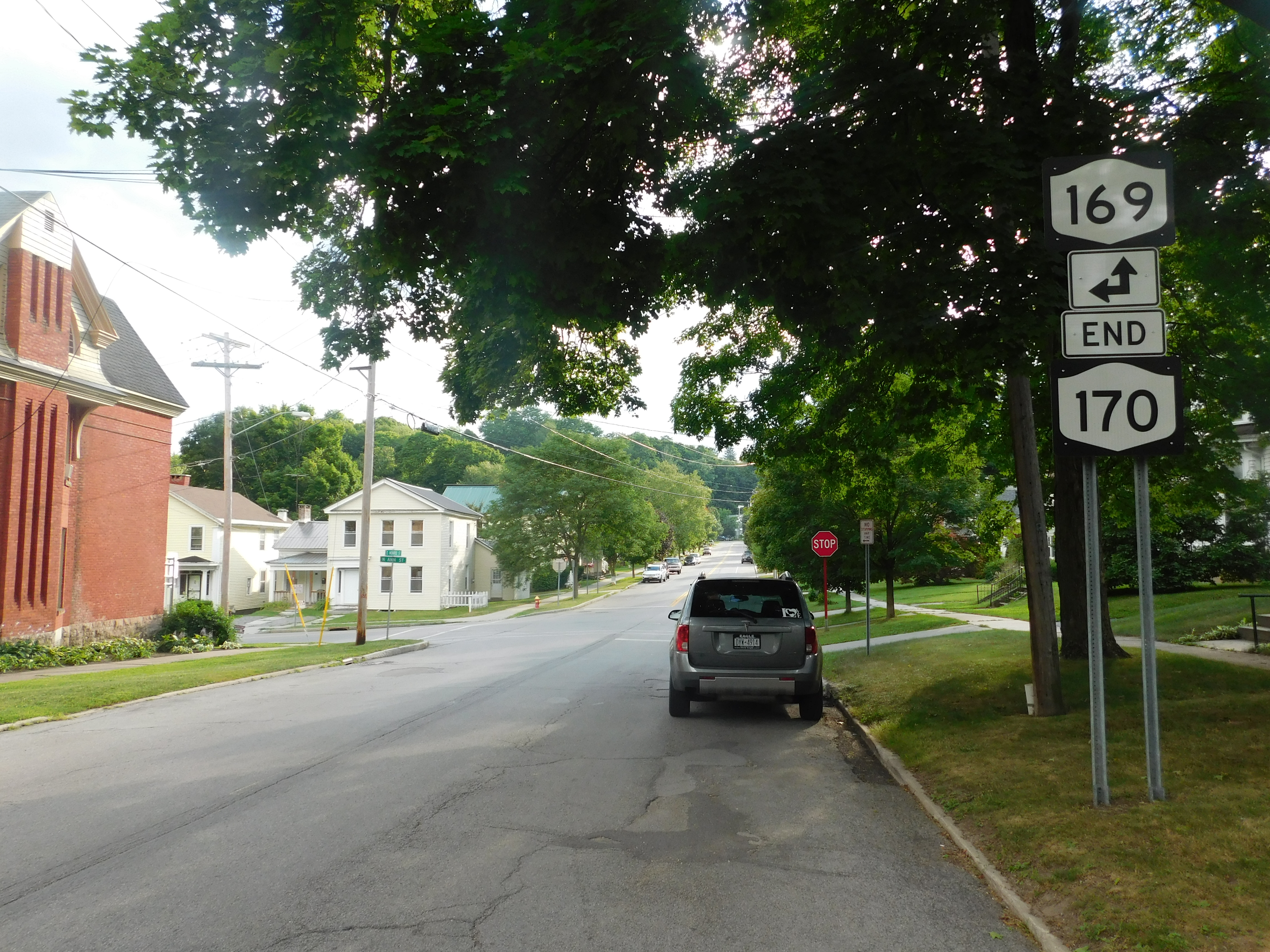
NY 170 southbound approaching NY 169 in Little Falls

NY 170 begins at an intersection with NY 169 (West Monroe and North Ann streets) in the city of Little Falls. The route proceeds eastward through the north end of Little Falls along the two-lane East Monroe Street, traversing several blocks of homes until the intersection with Moreland Street. At Moreland Street, NY 170 winds northward on a gradual bend up a hill west of Moreland Park. The route then gradually curves northwest, passing Holy Trinity Cemetery and an intersection with the western terminus of Burrell Road (unsigned County Route 9 or CR 9). NY 170 passes a large complex in Little Falls before turning north past the Little Falls Municipal Golf Course. Continuing north through Little Falls, the route intersects with Sabin Road and Dise Road (CR 159) at a four-way junction.

Still in the town of Little Falls, NY 170 crosses under power lines, crossing an intersection with Top Notch Road (CR 126) and Yellow Church Road (CR 92). At this intersection, the route crosses into the town of Fairfield, where two-lane rural roadway continues north, winding past several farms in Fairfield. The route soon intersects with the terminus of NY 170A, a short spur route of NY 170. At NY 170A, NY 170 bends northwest, crossing past several farms and an intersection with Castle Road (CR 7). The surroundings of NY 170 remain unchanged as the road continues northwest to an intersection with NY 29 in Fairfield that serves as NY 170's north end.

== History ==
The origins of NY 170 date back to the mid-1910s when the portion of the route outside of Little Falls was first brought up to state highway standards. A contract to rebuild the road was awarded on July 29, 1914, and the improved highway was added to the state highway system on August 27, 1918, as unsigned State Highway 468 (SH 468). In the 1930 renumbering of state highways in New York, hundreds of state-maintained highways were assigned a posted route number for the first time. SH 468 became part of NY 170, which continued southwest to NY 169 in Little Falls by way of locally maintained streets. An alternate route of NY 170 through the town of Fairfield was designated as NY 170A by the following year. Most of what became NY 170A was added to the state highway system in the 1920s; however, the northernmost 1.24 miles (2.00 km) were added on October 11, 1912, as part of a larger project that rebuilt a 4-mile (6.4 km) section of modern NY 29.

== Major intersections ==
The entire route is in Herkimer County.

Location	mi	km	Destinations	Notes
City of Little Falls	0.00	0.00	NY 169 (West Monroe Street / North Ann Street)	Southern terminus
Fairfield	4.17	6.71	NY 170A north	Southern terminus of NY 170A
Fairfield	7.33	11.80	NY 29	Northern terminus
1.000 mi = 1.609 km; 1.000 km = 0.621 mi

== NY 170A ==
New York State Route 170A
- Location: Fairfield
- Length: 2.95 mi (4.75 km)
- Existed: 1931–

NY 170A is a 2.95-mile (4.75 km) spur connecting NY 170 to the hamlet of Salisbury in Fairfield, where it ends at NY 29. NY 170A was designated by 1931.
