= Starkville, New York =

- Hamlet
- Location within New York Location within the United States
- Coordinates: 42°55′09″N 74°46′30″W
- Country: United States
- State: New York
- County: Herkimer
- Town: Stark
- Elevation: 679 ft (207 m)
- Time zone: UTC-5 (Eastern (EST))
  - Summer (DST): UTC-4 (EDT)
- Area code: 315

Starkville is a hamlet located west of Fort Plain on NY 80, in the eastern part of the town of Stark in southern Herkimer County, New York, United States. Established in the late 18th century, at one time the hamlet had a post office, three churches (Lutheran, Methodist, and Baptist), two hotels, a store, several mills, a cheese factory, a number of shops and about 40 homes. In 2014, many of these structures are gone, but several remain, including an old carriage house factory and two churches on Rt. 80, one of which is in private ownership as an art studio.

In 1905, Starkville had a population of about 150 people.

== Notable person ==
- Amelia Minerva Starkweather (1840–1926), educator and author
