= Stark, New York =

- Town
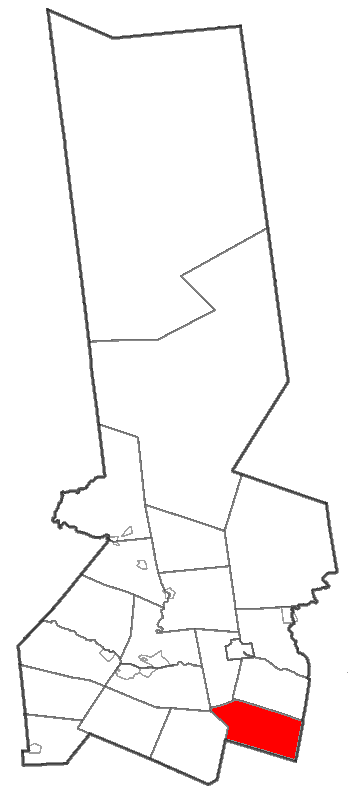
- Location of Stark in Herkimer County

- Location within New York Location within the United States
- Coordinates: 42°54′54″N 74°48′56″W
- Country: United States
- State: New York
- County: Herkimer

Government
  - Type: Town Council
  - Town Supervisor: Richard Bronner (D)
  - Town Council: Members' List: • Emil M. Ziaja (R); • Anne L. Miller (D); • Tom Puskarenko (D); • John D. Sprague, Sr. (R)

Area
  - Total: 31.58 sq mi (81.78 km^{2})
  - Land: 31.57 sq mi (81.77 km^{2})
  - Water: 0.0039 sq mi (0.01 km^{2})
- Elevation: 1,283 ft (391 m)

Population (2010)
  - Total: 757
  - Estimate (2016): 726
  - Density: 23.0/sq mi (8.88/km^{2})
- Time zone: UTC-5 (Eastern (EST))
  - Summer (DST): UTC-4 (EDT)
- ZIP Codes: 13475 (Van Hornesville); 13339 (Fort Plain); 13361 (Jordanville); 13407 (Mohawk)
- FIPS code: 36-043-70794
- GNIS feature ID: 0979520
- Website: https://www.townofstarkny.org/

Stark is a town in Herkimer County, New York, United States. The population was 757 at the 2010 census. The town was named after Revolutionary War general John Stark.

The town of Stark is in the eastern part of Herkimer County.

== History ==
Settlement took place before 1775, but many residents departed during the Revolutionary War. The town was established from part of the town of Danube in 1828.

== Notable people ==
- Marjorie Kinnan Rawlings bought property in Van Hornesville to obtain background for her novel, The Sojourner, and spent time there every year up to her death.
- Ray V. Pierce, former US congressman
- Owen D. Young, founder of the Radio Corporation of America, was a lifelong resident of Van Hornesville.

== Geography ==
According to the United States Census Bureau, the town has a total area of 31.9 square miles (82.5 km^{2}), of which 1.61 acres (6,520 m^{2}), or 0.01%, are water.

The eastern town line is the border of Montgomery County, and the southern town line is the border of Otsego County.

Otsquago Creek, a tributary of the Mohawk River, flows across the town from southwest to northeast.

== Demographics ==
Historical population
Census	Pop.	Note	%±
1830	1,781		—
1840	1,766		−0.8%
1850	1,576		−10.8%
1860	1,543		−2.1%
1870	1,541		−0.1%
1880	1,476		−4.2%
1890	1,248		−15.4%
1900	1,030		−17.5%
1910	897		−12.9%
1920	811		−9.6%
1930	844		4.1%
1940	858		1.7%
1950	793		−7.6%
1960	783		−1.3%
1970	739		−5.6%
1980	824		11.5%
1990	759		−7.9%
2000	767		1.1%
2010	757		−1.3%
2016 (est.)	726		−4.1%
U.S. Decennial Census

As of the census of 2000, there were 767 people, 286 households, and 215 families residing in the town. The population density was 24.3 inhabitants per square mile (9.4/km^{2}). There were 334 housing units at an average density of 10.6 per square mile (4.1/km^{2}). The racial makeup of the town was 99.09% White, 0.39% African American, 0.39% Pacific Islander, and 0.13% from two or more races. Hispanic or Latino of any race were 0.26% of the population.

There were 286 households, out of which 36.0% had children under the age of 18 living with them, 61.2% were married couples living together, 8.4% had a female householder with no husband present, and 24.8% were non-families. 20.6% of all households were made up of individuals, and 11.9% had someone living alone who was 65 years of age or older. The average household size was 2.68 and the average family size was 3.13.

In the town, the population was spread out, with 29.2% under the age of 18, 5.5% from 18 to 24, 27.0% from 25 to 44, 23.1% from 45 to 64, and 15.3% who were 65 years of age or older. The median age was 37 years. For every 100 females, there were 110.1 males. For every 100 females age 18 and over, there were 106.5 males.

The median income for a household in the town was $31,518, and the median income for a family was $34,545. Males had a median income of $27,813 versus $21,042 for females. The per capita income for the town was $14,128. About 14.1% of families and 19.9% of the population were below the poverty line, including 33.3% of those under age 18 and 10.8% of those age 65 or over.

== Communities and locations in Stark ==
- Cramer Corners – A location near the northern town line.
- Deck – A hamlet west of Smith Corners.
- Smith Corners – A hamlet in the northwestern part of the town.
- Starkville – A hamlet in the eastern part of the town on Route 80.
- Van Hornesville – A hamlet in the southwestern part of the town.
- Willse Four Corners – A location near the southern town line.
