= Schuyler, New York =

Town in Herkimer County, New York, US

- Town
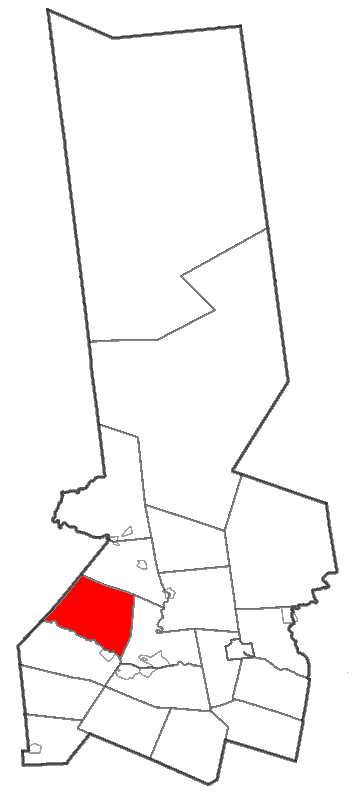
- Location of Schuyler in Herkimer County

- Location within New York Location within the United States
- Coordinates: 43°5′46″N 75°5′53″W
- Country: United States
- State: New York
- County: Herkimer

Government
  - Type: Town Council
  - Town Supervisor: John J. Werczynski (R)
  - Town Council: Members' List: • vacant (Deputy Supervisor) (R); • Eric Kane (R); • George Luther III (R); • Joseph Juliano (R); • Dale Dodge (R)

Area
  - Total: 40.23 sq mi (104.20 km^{2})
  - Land: 39.87 sq mi (103.27 km^{2})
  - Water: 0.36 sq mi (0.93 km^{2})
- Elevation: 669 ft (204 m)

Population (2010)
  - Total: 3,420
  - Estimate (2016): 3,352
  - Density: 84.1/sq mi (32.46/km^{2})
- Time zone: UTC-5 (Eastern (EST))
  - Summer (DST): UTC-4 (EDT)
- ZIP Codes: 13340 (Frankfort); 13502 (Utica); 13416 (Newport); 13431 (Poland)
- Area code: 315
- FIPS code: 36-043-65695
- GNIS feature ID: 0979473
- Website: townofschuylerny.gov

Schuyler (/skaɪlər/ SKY-lər) is a town in Herkimer County, New York, United States. The population was 3,420 at the 2010 census. The town is in the western part of Herkimer County and is east of Utica.

== History ==
The area was first settled around 1765. The town of Schuyler was formed in 1792 from part of the town of Herkimer. In 1797, part of Schuyler was taken to form the newer town of Trenton. Schuyler was further reduced in 1798 to form the town of Deerfield (Oneida County) and in 1806 to form the town of Newport.

== Geography ==
According to the United States Census Bureau, the town of Schuyler has a total area of 40.2 square miles (104.2 km^{2}), of which 39.9 square miles (103.3 km^{2}) are land and 0.3 square miles (0.9 km^{2}), or 0.89%, are water.

The western town line is the border of Oneida County, and the southern town line is marked by the Mohawk River.

The New York State Thruway (Interstate 90) and the Erie Canal pass across the southern part of the town, and the Schuyler Travel Plaza is on the westbound side of the Thruway within the town.

== Demographics ==
Historical population
Census	Pop.	Note	%±
1820	1,837		—
1830	2,074		12.9%
1840	1,798		−13.3%
1850	1,696		−5.7%
1860	1,715		1.1%
1870	1,558		−9.2%
1880	1,452		−6.8%
1890	1,259		−13.3%
1900	1,365		8.4%
1910	1,227		−10.1%
1920	1,007		−17.9%
1930	1,146		13.8%
1940	1,176		2.6%
1950	1,169		−0.6%
1960	1,893		61.9%
1970	2,808		48.3%
1980	2,886		2.8%
1990	3,508		21.6%
2000	3,385		−3.5%
2010	3,420		1.0%
2016 (est.)	3,352		−2.0%
U.S. Decennial Census

As of the census of 2000, there were 3,385 people, 1,418 households, and 937 families residing in the town. The population density was 85.0 inhabitants per square mile (32.8/km^{2}). There were 1,541 housing units at an average density of 38.7 per square mile (14.9/km^{2}). The racial makeup of the town was 97.96% White, 0.50% African American, 0.03% Native American, 0.44% Asian, 0.06% Pacific Islander, 0.15% from other races, and 0.86% from two or more races. Hispanic or Latino of any race were 0.62% of the population.

There were 1,418 households, out of which 28.9% had children under the age of 18 living with them, 50.9% were married couples living together, 10.9% had a female householder with no husband present, and 33.9% were non-families. 28.4% of all households were made up of individuals, and 12.4% had someone living alone who was 65 years of age or older. The average household size was 2.38 and the average family size was 2.93.

In the town, the population was spread out, with 23.8% under the age of 18, 6.5% from 18 to 24, 28.9% from 25 to 44, 25.3% from 45 to 64, and 15.5% who were 65 years of age or older. The median age was 40 years. For every 100 females, there were 95.3 males. For every 100 females age 18 and over, there were 90.9 males.

The median income for a household in the town was $35,375, and the median income for a family was $42,500. Males had a median income of $30,078 versus $22,407 for females. The per capita income for the town was $18,205. About 6.4% of families and 9.4% of the population were below the poverty line, including 14.8% of those under age 18 and 9.1% of those age 65 or over.

== Communities and locations in Schuyler, New York ==
- Baker Corners – A hamlet north of West Schuyler
- Carey Corners – A location in the northeastern corner of the town
- East Schuyler – A hamlet in the southeastern part of the town
- Johnson Corners – A location northwest of East Schuyler
- Minott Corners – A location near the eastern town line, north of Johnson Corners
- Sheaf Corners – A location northwest of Johnson Corners
- West Schuyler – A hamlet on Route 5 in the southwestern corner of the town
- Windfall – A location northeast of Baker Corners

The now-defunct hamlet of Dutch Settlement is also listed in the official New York State Gazetteer, maintained and published by the New York State Department of Health, which includes numerous defunct hamlets and towns, some with alternate or archaic spellings.
