= Danube, New York =

- Town
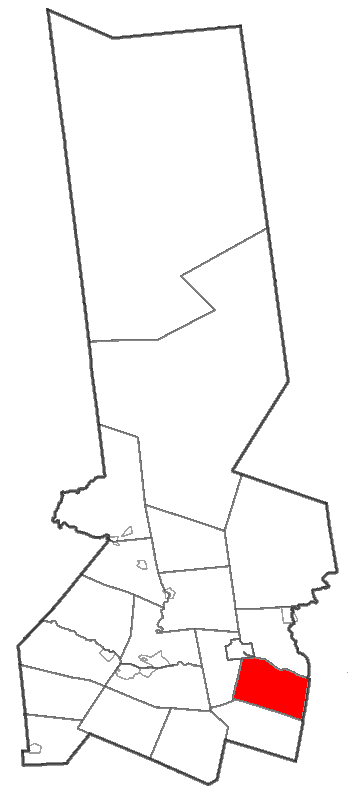
- Location within Herkimer County

- Location within New York Location within the United States
- Coordinates: 42°59′17″N 74°48′9″W
- Country: United States
- State: New York
- County: Herkimer

Government
  - Type: Town Council
  - Town Supervisor: Rick Mosher
  - Town Council: Members' List: • Patricia A. Jodway (D); • Alicia B. Cook (R); • Lee Ann Stock (R); • James L. Lasher (R)

Area
  - Total: 29.61 sq mi (76.70 km^{2})
  - Land: 29.36 sq mi (76.03 km^{2})
  - Water: 0.26 sq mi (0.67 km^{2})
- Elevation: 443 ft (135 m)

Population (2020)
  - Total: 953
  - Density: 32.5/sq mi (12.54/km^{2})
- Time zone: UTC-5 (Eastern (EST))
  - Summer (DST): UTC-4 (EDT)
- ZIP Code: 13365 (Little Falls); 13339 (Fort Plain); 13407 (Mohawk)
- FIPS code: 36-043-19686
- GNIS feature ID: 0978885
- Website: www.town.danube.ny.us

Danube is a town in Herkimer County, New York, United States. The population was 953 at the 2020 census, down from 1,039 in 2010. Early Palatine German immigrants in the eighteenth century named the town after the Danube River in Europe.

The town is in southeastern Herkimer County, southeast of the city of Little Falls and south of the Mohawk River.

== History ==
The town was first settled by Europeans around 1730 on the territories of Lindsey's (1730) and Van Horne's (1731) patents. The town was within the territory of the Mohawk people.

In coordination with the colonial government, the Mohawk had allowed a fortified settlement east of here. They had agreed in 1712 to allow some settlement by Palatine Germans in exchange for Queen Anne helping with their defense against the French and Indian allies. Fort Schuyler was constructed south of the Mohawk River near one of their major settlements at the time.

The town of Danube was formed in 1817 from the town of Minden (in Montgomery County). Part of Danube was taken off in 1828 to form the town of Stark.

The Herkimer Home and Mohawk Upper Castle Historic District are listed on the National Register of Historic Places.

== Notable people ==
- King Hendrick, Mohawk leader, lived in Canajoharie, what was also known to the English as the Upper Indian Castle. The site of the village is a National Historic Landmark.
- Nicholas Herkimer, German descendant, had his house here; he became a New York state militia general during the Revolutionary War and died due to wounds incurred in the Battle of Oriskany.
- John Herkimer, his nephew, judge, soldier and New York congressman
- William Sickles, Medal of Honor winner, Civil War.

== Geography ==
According to the United States Census Bureau, the town has a total area of 29.6 square miles (76.7 km^{2}), of which 29.3 square miles (76.0 km^{2}) are land and 0.3 square miles (0.7 km^{2}), or 0.87%, are water.

The eastern town line is the border of Montgomery County. The northern town boundary is marked by the Mohawk River and the Erie Canal.

The New York State Thruway (Interstate 90) passes across the northern part of the town. New York State Route 5S is an east–west highway that parallels the Thruway. New York State Route 169 intersects NY-5S and the Thruway in the northwestern part of Danube.

== Demographics ==
Historical population
Census	Pop.	Note	%±
1820	3,187		—
1830	1,723		−45.9%
1840	1,960		13.8%
1850	1,730		−11.7%
1860	1,711		−1.1%
1870	1,324		−22.6%
1880	1,235		−6.7%
1890	1,116		−9.6%
1900	1,043		−6.5%
1910	941		−9.8%
1920	746		−20.7%
1930	790		5.9%
1940	849		7.5%
1950	847		−0.2%
1960	911		7.6%
1970	1,015		11.4%
1980	1,081		6.5%
1990	1,077		−0.4%
2000	1,098		1.9%
2010	1,039		−5.4%
2020	953		−8.3%
U.S. Decennial Census

As of the census of 2000, there were 1,098 people, 398 households, and 280 families residing in the town. The population density was 37.4 inhabitants per square mile (14.4/km^{2}). There were 442 housing units at an average density of 15.0 per square mile (5.8/km^{2}). The racial makeup of the town was 96.90% White, 0.82% African American, 0.36% Native American, 0.91% Asian, 0.09% from other races, and 0.91% from two or more races. Hispanic or Latino of any race were 0.91% of the population.

There were 398 households, out of which 35.9% had children under the age of 18 living with them, 52.8% were married couples living together, 9.3% had a female householder with no husband present, and 29.6% were non-families. 23.6% of all households were made up of individuals, and 9.8% had someone living alone who was 65 years of age or older. The average household size was 2.76 and the average family size was 3.22.

In the town, the population was spread out, with 31.1% under the age of 18, 6.6% from 18 to 24, 28.8% from 25 to 44, 22.8% from 45 to 64, and 10.8% who were 65 years of age or older. The median age was 35 years. For every 100 females, there were 111.6 males. For every 100 females age 18 and over, there were 112.0 males.

The median income for a household in the town was $31,815, and the median income for a family was $32,500. Males had a median income of $28,661 versus $20,000 for females. The per capita income for the town was $13,572. About 15.5% of families and 18.4% of the population were below the poverty line, including 27.8% of those under age 18 and 6.2% of those age 65 or over.

== Communities ==
- Danube – A location in the northern part of the town on NY-5S.
- Davys Corners – A location in the northeastern corner of the town.
- Fink Basin – A hamlet near the Mohawk River by NY-169
- Herkimer Home State Historic Site – The home of Nicholas Herkimer is near Fink Basin and the Mohawk River.
- Indian Castle – A hamlet in the northeastern part of the town, east of Danube village.
- Newville-- A hamlet in the southwestern part of the town on County Road 32. The Zoller-Frasier Round Barn was added to the National Register of Historic Places in 1984.
