= Newport, New York =

- Town
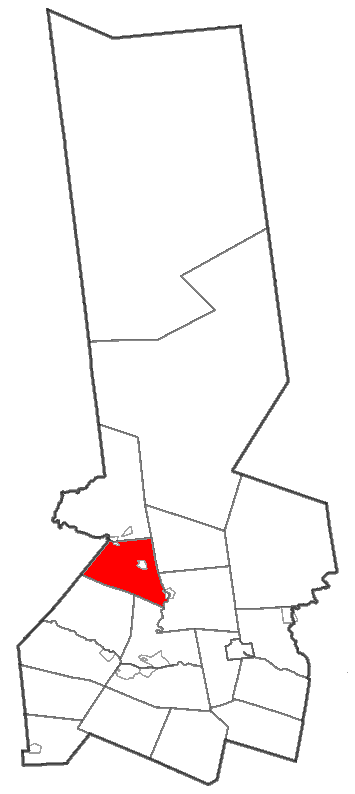
- Location of Newport in Herkimer County
- Coordinates: 43°10′43″N 75°00′53″W
- Country: United States
- State: New York
- County: Herkimer

Government
  - Type: Town Council
  - Town Supervisor: Nathaniel Lowell (D)
  - Town Board: Members' List: • Curtis Damone (R); • John Brucker (R); • Patricia Goodman (R); • Josephine Coleman (D)

Area
  - Total: 32.45 sq mi (84.05 km^{2})
  - Land: 32.01 sq mi (82.90 km^{2})
  - Water: 0.44 sq mi (1.15 km^{2})

Population (2010)
  - Total: 2,302
  - Estimate (2019): 2,225
  - Density: 70.9/sq mi (27.36/km^{2})
- Time zone: EST
  - Summer (DST): EDT
- ZIP Codes: 13416 (Newport); 13431 (Poland); 13324 (Cold Brook); 13350 (Herkimer)
- Area code: 315
- FIPS code: 36-043-50584
- Website: townofnewportny.gov

Newport is a town in Herkimer County, New York, United States. The population was 2,302 at the 2010 census. The town, located on the western edge of the county, contains the village of Newport. The town is northeast of Utica.

== History ==
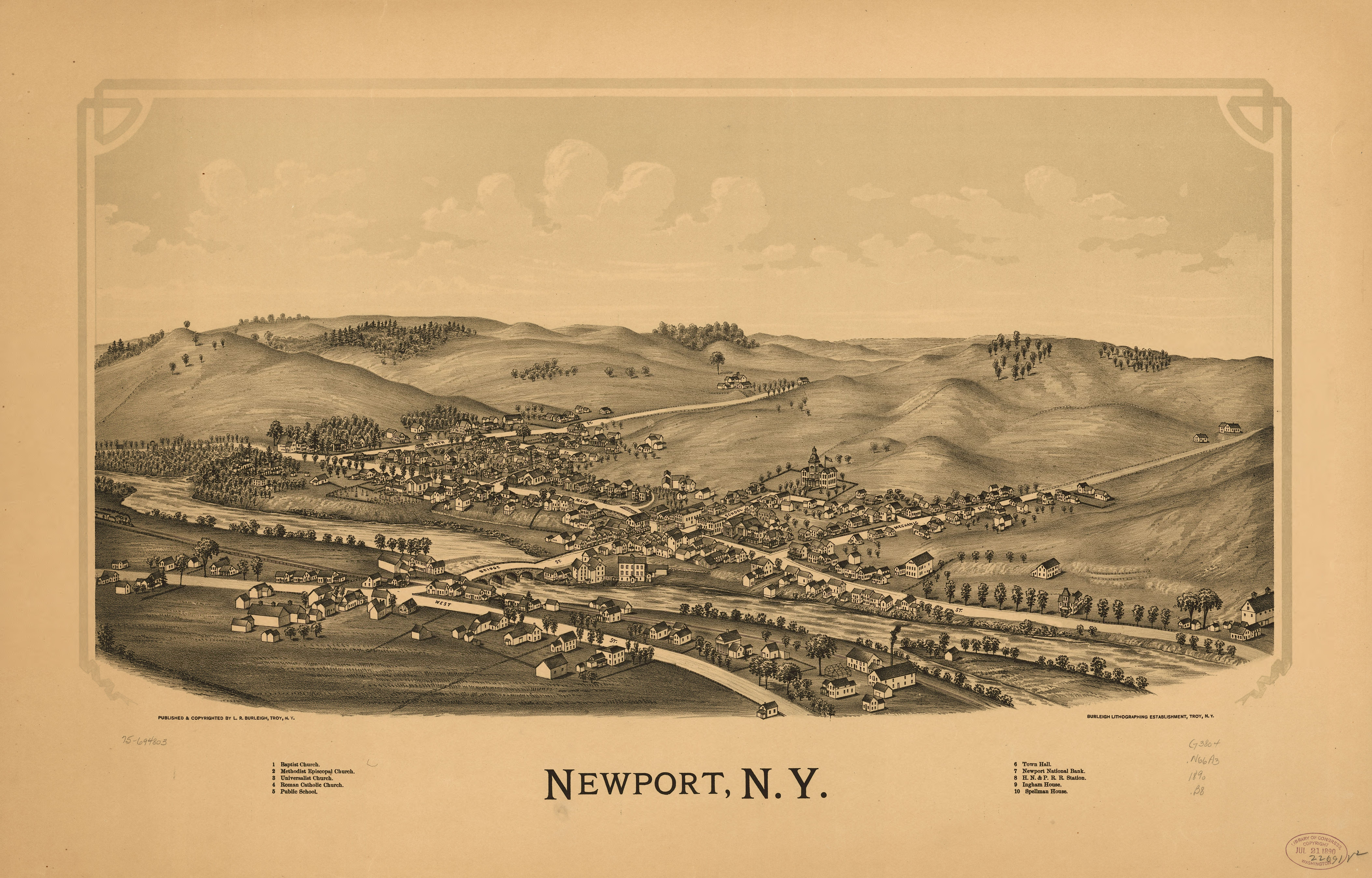
Perspective map of Newport, New York and list of landmarks published by L.R. Burleigh in 1890

The first settlement took place after 1786. The town was formed in 1805 from parts of the towns of Fairfield, Herkimer, Norway, and Schuyler.

Two structures in the town are listed on the New York State Register of Historic Places and the National Register of Historic Places:

James Keith House and Brown-Morey-Davis Farm

== Geography ==
According to the United States Census Bureau, the town has a total area of 32.4 square miles (84.0 km^{2}), of which 32.0 square miles (82.9 km^{2}) are land and 0.42 square miles (1.1 km^{2}), or 1.37%, are water.

The western town line is the border of Oneida County. West Canada Creek, a tributary of the Mohawk River, flows through the town and partly defines the eastern boundary.

== Demographics ==
Historical population
Census	Pop.	Note	%±
1820	1,746		—
1830	1,863		6.7%
1840	2,020		8.4%
1850	2,125		5.2%
1860	2,113		−0.6%
1870	1,954		−7.5%
1880	1,953		−0.1%
1890	1,835		−6.0%
1900	1,613		−12.1%
1910	1,490		−7.6%
1920	1,700		14.1%
1930	1,768		4.0%
1940	1,481		−16.2%
1950	1,626		9.8%
1960	1,907		17.3%
1970	1,992		4.5%
1980	2,206		10.7%
1990	2,148		−2.6%
2000	2,202		2.5%
2010	2,302		4.5%
2019 (est.)	2,225	▼	−3.3%
U.S. Decennial Census

As of the census of 2000, there were 2,192 people, 831 households, and 595 families residing in the town. The population density was 68.4 inhabitants per square mile (26.4/km^{2}). There were 897 housing units at an average density of 28.0 per square mile (10.8/km^{2}). The racial makeup of the town was 98.77% White, 0.41% Black or African American, 0.05% Asian, 0.23% from other races, and 0.55% from two or more races. Hispanic or Latino of any race were 0.82% of the population.

There were 831 households, out of which 35.0% had children under the age of 18 living with them, 58.7% were married couples living together, 9.1% had a female householder with no husband present, and 28.3% were non-families. 23.7% of all households were made up of individuals, and 11.1% had someone living alone who was 65 years of age or older. The average household size was 2.64 and the average family size was 3.11.

In the town, the population was spread out, with 26.6% under the age of 18, 6.0% from 18 to 24, 28.6% from 25 to 44, 24.8% from 45 to 64, and 14.1% who were 65 years of age or older. The median age was 38 years. For every 100 females, there were 89.9 males. For every 100 females age 18 and over, there were 93.0 males.

The median income for a household in the town was $37,300, and the median income for a family was $42,273. Males had a median income of $30,433 versus $25,391 for females. The per capita income for the town was $17,044. About 5.3% of families and 8.2% of the population were below the poverty line, including 14.1% of those under age 18 and 7.8% of those age 65 or over.

== Government and politics ==
Democrat Nathaniel E. Lowell was elected to a two-year term as Town Supervisor in 2023, and took office at the start of 2024. "November 7, 2023 General Official Results". 2023. The Town has a Town Council form of government, with a Town Board consisting of five members, including the Town Supervisor.

Town Departments include an Animal Control Department, Assessment Department, Codes Department, Highway Department, History Center, Planning Board, Town Board, Town Clerk, Town Justice Court, Town Supervisor, and Zoning Board of Appeals. www.townofnewportny.org

== Communities and locations in the town of Newport ==
- Farrel Corner – A hamlet west of Newport village.
- Harter Hill – A pair of elevations located west of Middleville.
- Honey Hill – An elevation located west of Newport.
- Irish Settlement – A hamlet near the southern town line.
- Martin Corner – A location near the western town line.
- Middleville – Part of the village of Middleville is on Route 28 by the eastern town line and the West Canada Creek.
- Newport – The village of Newport is on Route 28 by the eastern town line and the West Canada Creek.
- Poland – The south part of the village of Poland is in the northwestern corner of the town.
- Old City – A hamlet at the east town line.
- Schrader Hill – An elevation located west of Middleville. Partially in the Town of Herkimer.
- Tanner Hill – An elevation located west-northwest of Middleville.
- Welch Corners – A location at the eastern town line, south of Old City.
- Woodchuck Hill – An elevation located east of Newport.
