= Little Falls (town), New York =

Little Falls, New York
- Town
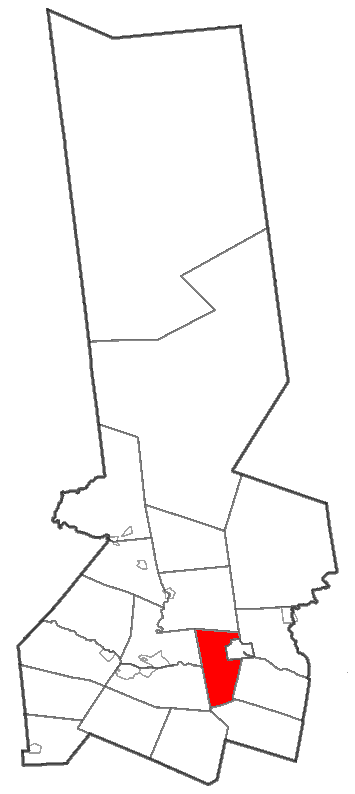
- Location of town in Herkimer County

- Location within New York Location within the United States
- Coordinates: 43°1′2″N 74°53′26″W
- Country: United States
- State: New York
- County: Herkimer

Government
  - Type: Town Council
  - Town Supervisor: Brian T. Marhaver (D)
  - Town Council: Members' List: • Eric Gehring (R); • Kirk J. Schwasnick (R); • Allan Beadle (R); • William R. Klock, Jr. (R)

Area
  - Total: 22.50 sq mi (58.28 km^{2})
  - Land: 22.34 sq mi (57.86 km^{2})
  - Water: 0.16 sq mi (0.42 km^{2})
- Elevation: 404 ft (123 m)

Population (2020)
  - Total: 1,497
  - Density: 67.0/sq mi (25.87/km^{2})
- Time zone: UTC-5 (Eastern (EST))
  - Summer (DST): UTC-4 (EDT)
- ZIP code: 13365
- Area code: 315
- FIPS code: 36-42752
- GNIS feature ID: 0979158
- Website: townoflittlefallsny.com

Little Falls is a town in Herkimer County, New York, United States. The population was 1,497 at the 2020 census, down from 1,587 at the 2010 census. The town is named after falls and rapids on the Mohawk River nearby.

The town of Little Falls is bordered on the east by the separate city of Little Falls. Both town and city are east of Utica. It was formed in 1829 from the town of Herkimer.

== Geography ==
According to the United States Census Bureau, the town has a total area of 22.5 square miles (58.3 km^{2}), of which 22.4 square miles (57.9 km^{2}) are land and 0.2 square miles (0.4 km^{2}), or 0.72%, are water.

The Mohawk River and the Erie Canal cross the central portion of the town.

North-south highways New York State Route 169 and New York State Route 170 converge on the city of Little Falls. New York State Route 5 is an east-west highway north of the Mohawk River. New York State Route 5S is an east-west highway south of the Mohawk River.

The town is surrounded by hills.

== Demographics ==
Historical population
Census	Pop.	Note	%±
1830	2,539		—
1840	3,881		52.9%
1850	4,855		25.1%
1860	5,989		23.4%
1870	5,612		−6.3%
1880	6,913		23.2%
1890	1,055		−84.7%
1900	931		−11.8%
1910	638		−31.5%
1920	684		7.2%
1930	741		8.3%
1940	777		4.9%
1950	874		12.5%
1960	1,188		35.9%
1970	1,411		18.8%
1980	1,434		1.6%
1990	1,635		14.0%
2000	1,544		−5.6%
2010	1,587		2.8%
2020	1,497		−5.7%
U.S. Decennial Census

As of the census of 2000, there were 1,544 people, 580 households, and 454 families residing in the town. The population density was 68.9 inhabitants per square mile (26.6/km^{2}). There were 637 housing units at an average density of 28.4 per square mile (11.0/km^{2}). The racial makeup of the town was 98.51% White, 0.26% Black or African American, 0.06% Native American, 0.71% Asian, 0.06% from other races, and 0.39% from two or more races. Hispanic or Latino of any race were 0.26% of the population.

There were 580 households, out of which 35.9% had children under the age of 18 living with them, 65.0% were married couples living together, 7.8% had a female householder with no husband present, and 21.6% were non-families. 17.8% of all households were made up of individuals, and 8.8% had someone living alone who was 65 years of age or older. The average household size was 2.66 and the average family size was 2.98.

In the town, the population was spread out, with 25.7% under the age of 18, 6.7% from 18 to 24, 29.7% from 25 to 44, 24.2% from 45 to 64, and 13.7% who were 65 years of age or older. The median age was 39 years. For every 100 females, there were 101.8 males. For every 100 females age 18 and over, there were 103.0 males.

The median income for a household in the town was $38,875, and the median income for a family was $43,393. Males had a median income of $30,952 versus $21,065 for females. The per capita income for the town was $20,383. About 7.8% of families and 10.7% of the population were below the poverty line, including 13.3% of those under age 18 and 6.5% of those age 65 or over.

== Communities and locations in the Town of Little Falls ==
- Jacksonburg – A hamlet located west of the city of Little Falls on NY 5S.
- Kelhi Corners – A hamlet located in the northern part of the town on NY 169.
- Paines Hollow – A hamlet located in the southern part of the town at the corner of NY 167 and NY 168.
- Wrights Corners – A hamlet located in the southern part of the town on NY 167.
