= Dolgeville Central School District =

School district in New York, United States

Location
- Coordinates: 43°06′15″N 74°46′45″W

District information
- Type: Public
- Grades: K-12
- Superintendent: Joseph Gilfus
- Schools: 1
- NCES District ID: 3600001.

Students and staff
- Students: 828
- Teachers: 67.5
- Student–teacher ratio: 12.27
- District mascot: Blue Devil
- Colors: Blue and White

Other information
- Website: Official website

Dolgeville Central School District is a school district in Herkimer County, New York and Fulton County, New York.

A large rural district, it covers parts of the towns of Fairfield, Manheim, and Salisbury in Herkimer County, and parts of the towns of Ephratah, Oppenheim, and Stratford in Fulton County. It includes the entirety of the village of Dolgeville and the hamlet of Salisbury Center. It also includes a very small portion of Morehouse, Hamilton County.

It is part of Herkimer-Fulton-Hamilton-Otsego BOCES. The high school was built in 1954, and an attached elementary school was built in the 1980s after the Stratford school district was annexed. The old elementary school building on Main Street remains vacant.

The district received statewide attention in 2015 when 89% of students opted out of standardized testing for third through eighth graders, tied with the Chateaugay district for highest opt-out rate in the state.

Bullying incidents in 2025 and 2026 were investigated by police, with the latter resulting in criminal charges for a student.
