= Oak Mountain =

Oak Mountain may refer to:

- Oak Mountain (Missouri), a summit in Missouri
- Oak Mountain State Park, a southern spur of the Appalachian Mountains in Shelby County, Alabama, home to Double Oak mountain
- Oak Mountain High School, in Birmingham, Alabama
- Oak Mountain Amphitheatre, formerly known as the Verizon Wireless Music Center, Pelham, Alabama
- The original name of Mount Lowe in California
- Oak Mountain (Herkimer County, New York), a summit located in Central New York
- Oak Mountain (Riverside County)
