= Jerseyfield Mountain =

Mountain in New York, United States

- Location within New York Location within the United States

Highest point
- Elevation: 2,287 feet (697 m)
- Coordinates: 43°15′50″N 74°43′54″W, 43°15′43″N 74°45′01″W

Geography
- Location: NW of Stratford, New York, U.S.
- Topo map: USGS Stratford

Jerseyfield Mountain is a summit located in Central New York Region of New York located in the Town of Salisbury in Herkimer County, northwest of Stratford.

Jerseyfield Mountain has an elevation of 697 metres (2,287 ft) above sea level and rises about 85 metres (279 ft) above the surrounding terrain.
