= Salisbury, Herkimer County, New York =

Salisbury, New York
- Town
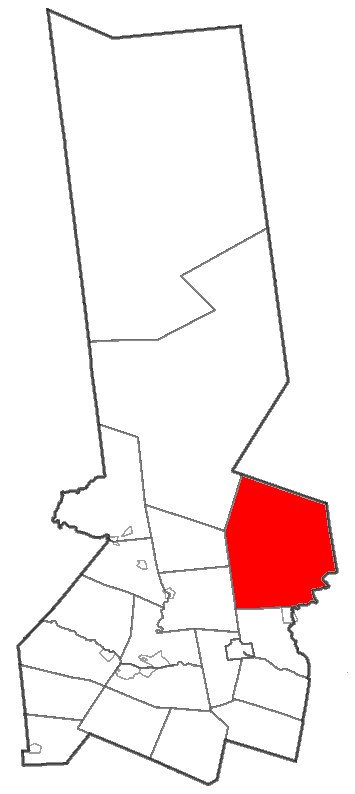
- Location of Salisbury in Herkimer County

- Location within New York Location within the United States
- Country: United States
- State: New York
- County: Herkimer

Government
  - Type: Town council

Area
  - Total: 108.20 sq mi (280.24 km^{2})
  - Land: 107.37 sq mi (278.08 km^{2})
  - Water: 0.83 sq mi (2.16 km^{2})
- Elevation: 1,736 ft (529 m)

Population (2010)
  - Total: 1,958
  - Density: 18/sq mi (7/km^{2})
- Time zone: UTC-5 (Eastern (EST))
  - Summer (DST): UTC-4 (EDT)
- ZIP Codes: 13454 (Salisbury Center); 13329 (Dolgeville); 13365 (Little Falls); 13470 (Stratford); 13324 (Cold Brook)
- Area code: 315
- FIPS code: 36-043-64837
- GNIS feature ID: 979454
- Website: https://townofsalisburyny.gov/

Salisbury is a town in Herkimer County, New York, United States. The population was 1,958 at the 2010 census. The town is on the eastern edge of the county, north of the city of Little Falls. The northern part of the town is in the Adirondack Park. The town was formed in 1797 from the town of Palatine.

== History ==
Salisbury contains parts of the Jerseyfield Patent of 1770. The town was formed in 1797 from the town of Palatine while in Montgomery County. Salisbury was annexed to Herkimer County in 1817.

The population of Salisbury in 1865 was 2,123.

The town justice was removed in 2024 for multiple acts of misconduct.

The Augustus Frisbie House, Salisbury Center Covered Bridge, and Salisbury Center Grange Hall are listed on the National Register of Historic Places. The covered bridge is celebrated by the annual Covered Bridge Day town festival.

== Geography ==
According to the United States Census Bureau, the town has a total area of 108.2 square miles (280.2 km^{2}), of which 107.4 square miles (278.1 km^{2}) are land and 0.85 square miles (2.2 km^{2}), or 0.77%, are water.

The northern town line is the border of Hamilton County, and the eastern town line is the border of Fulton County. East Canada Creek marks the southeastern town line.

== Demographics ==
Historical population
Census	Pop.	Note	%±
1820	1,458		—
1830	1,999		37.1%
1840	1,859		−7.0%
1850	2,035		9.5%
1860	2,325		14.3%
1870	1,933		−16.9%
1880	1,884		−2.5%
1890	1,800		−4.5%
1900	1,426		−20.8%
1910	1,468		2.9%
1920	1,418		−3.4%
1930	1,244		−12.3%
1940	1,319		6.0%
1950	1,469		11.4%
1960	1,551		5.6%
1970	1,741		12.3%
1980	1,946		11.8%
1990	1,934		−0.6%
2000	1,953		1.0%
2010	1,958		0.3%
2014 (est.)	1,921		−1.9%
U.S. Decennial Census

As of the census of 2000, there were 1,953 people, 689 households, and 507 families residing in the town. The population density was 18.2 inhabitants per square mile (7.0/km^{2}). There were 926 housing units at an average density of 8.6 per square mile (3.3/km^{2}). The racial makeup of the town was 98.36% White, 0.15% African American, 0.05% Native American, 0.41% Asian, 0.10% from other races, and 0.92% from two or more races. Hispanic or Latino of any race were 0.15% of the population.

There were 689 households, out of which 40.1% had children under the age of 18 living with them, 56.7% were married couples living together, 9.1% had a female householder with no husband present, and 26.3% were non-families. 20.5% of all households were made up of individuals, and 9.4% had someone living alone who was 65 years of age or older. The average household size was 2.83 and the average family size was 3.24.

In the town, the population was spread out, with 28.8% under the age of 18, 7.7% from 18 to 24, 29.3% from 25 to 44, 23.3% from 45 to 64, and 10.9% who were 65 years of age or older. The median age was 36 years. For every 100 females, there were 104.7 males. For every 100 females age 18 and over, there were 103.2 males.

The median income for a household in the town was $32,469, and the median income for a family was $36,384. Males had a median income of $26,314 versus $18,594 for females. The per capita income for the town was $12,642. About 8.4% of families and 12.3% of the population were below the poverty line, including 15.2% of those under age 18 and 14.0% of those age 65 or over.

== Notable people ==
- Adelbert Bleekman, former Wisconsin state senator
- Walter S. Greene, former Wisconsin state senator
- Hamilton Ward Sr., former US congressman
- Linus Yale Jr., mechanical engineer, inventor of the Pin-Tumbler Lock and founder of Yale Lock Co.

== Communities and locations in Salisbury ==
- Burrell Corners – A location southwest of Salisbury village.
- Curtis – A hamlet north of Salisbury village.
- Diamond Hill – An elevation located northwest of Salisbury.
- Emmonsburg – A location at the eastern town line.
- Fairview Corners – A location west of Irondale.
- Hedgehog Mountain – An elevation located north-northeast of Salisbury Center.
- Irondale – A hamlet north of Salisbury Center.
- Ives Hollow – A hamlet north of Salisbury village.
- Jerseyfield Mountain – An elevation located north of Oak Mountain.
- Oak Mountain – An elevation located northwest of Stratford.
- Paper Mill Corners – A hamlet northwest of Salisbury village.
- Poplar Knoll – An elevation located north-northeast of Salisbury Center.
- Salisbury – The hamlet of Salisbury is located on Route 29.
- Salisbury Center – A hamlet east of the hamlet of Salisbury on Route 29.
- Shed Corners – A location in the southeastern corner of the town.
- Spruce Lake – A small lake northwest of Salisbury village.
- The Pinnacle – An elevation located northeast of Salisbury Center.
- Woods Corners – A location east of Irondale.
