= Stouts Creek =

Stream in Iron and Madison counties in Missouri, United States

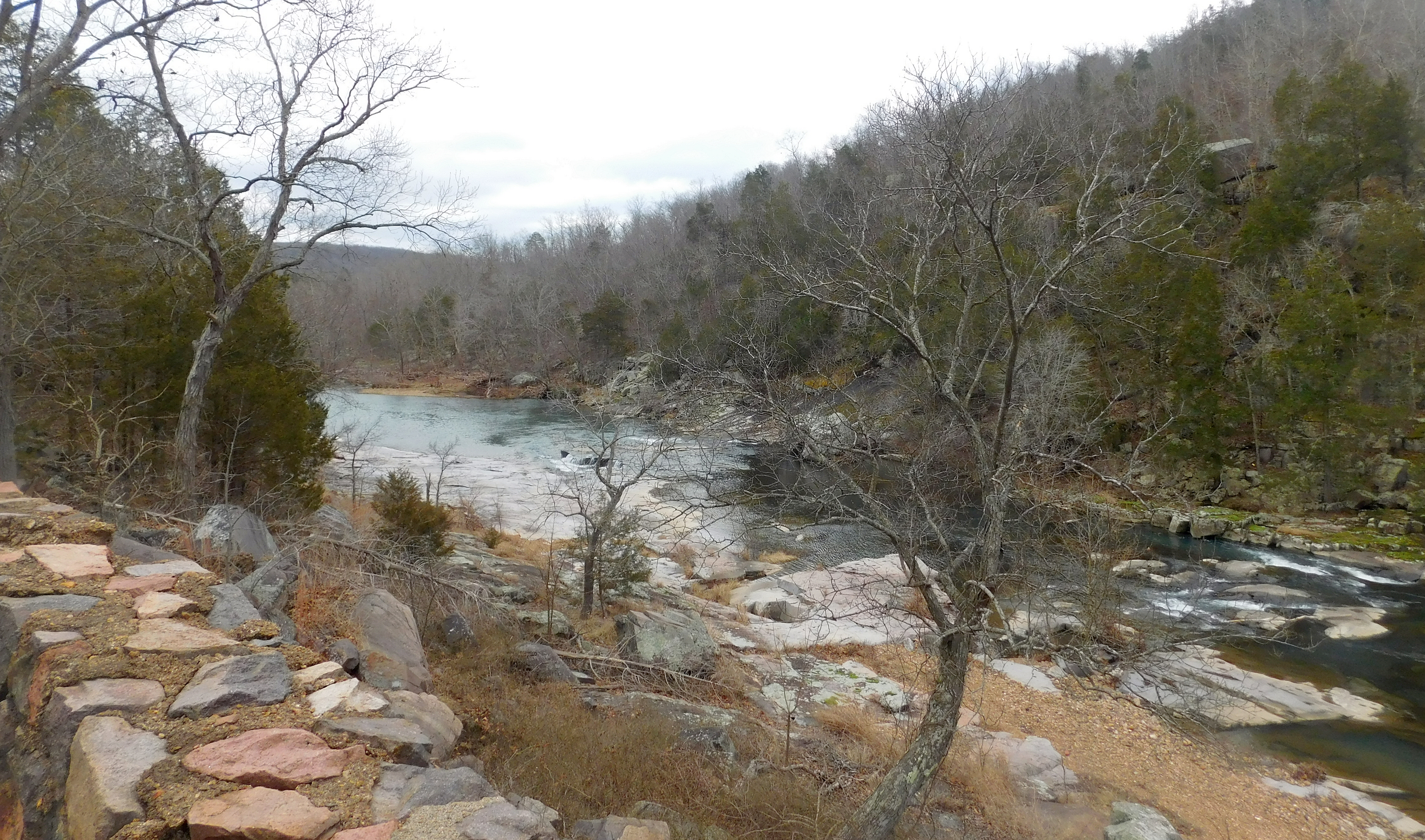
- Stouts Creek east of Arcadia, January 2017

Location
- Country: United States
- State: Missouri
- Counties: Iron and Madison

Physical characteristics
- Source
  - location: Iron County, Missouri
  - coordinates: 37°34′41″N 90°44′05″W
  - elevation: Approximately 410 m (1,350 ft)
- Mouth: St. Francis River
  - location: Madison County, Missouri
  - coordinates: 37°35′31″N 90°29′54″W
  - elevation: 208 m (682 ft)

Basin features
- Tributaries
  - left: Knob Creek
  - right: Buckner Branch

Stouts Creek is a stream in Iron and Madison counties in Missouri, United States.

== Description ==
The stream headwaters lie just northwest of Taum Sauk Mountain and it flows north then east to cross under Missouri Route 21 between Ironton and Arcadia. It continues east passing under Missouri Route 72 and past Lake Killarney. It flows into Madison County to its confluence with the St. Francis River east of Roselle.

Stouts Creek has the name of Ephraim Stout, a pioneer citizen.

== See also ==
- List of rivers of Missouri
