= List of places in New York: I =

This list of current cities, towns, unincorporated communities, counties, and other recognized places in the U.S. state of New York also includes information on the number and names of counties in which the place lies, and its lower and upper zip code bounds, if applicable.

List of places in New York: A | B | C | D | E | F | G | H | I | J | K | L | M | N | O | P | Q | R | S | T | U | V | W | X | Y | Z

Name of place	Counties	Principal county	Lower zip code	Upper zip code
Idaho	1	Livingston County		
Idle Hour	1	Suffolk County	11769	
Idlewood	1	Erie County	14085	
Igerna	1	Warren County	12853	
Ilion	1	Herkimer County	13357	
Imperial Plaza	1	Dutchess County	12590	
Inavale	1	Allegany County		
Independence	1	Allegany County	14806	
Independence	1	Allegany County		
Index	1	Otsego County	13326	
Indian Castle	1	Herkimer County	13365	
Indian Cove	1	Cayuga County	13118	
Indian Falls	1	Genesee County	14036	
Indian Hill	1	Orange County		
Indian Kettles	1	Warren County	12836	
Indian Lake	1	Hamilton County	12842	
Indian Lake	1	Hamilton County		
Indian Park	1	Orange County	10925	
Indian River	1	Lewis County	13327	
Indian Springs	1	Onondaga County	13027	
Indian Village	1	Onondaga County	13120	
Industry	1	Monroe County	14474	
Ingham Mills	2	Fulton County	13365	
Ingham Mills	2	Herkimer County	13365	
Ingham Mills Station	1	Herkimer County		
Ingleside	1	Steuben County	14512	
Ingraham	1	Clinton County	12992	
Inlet	1	Hamilton County	13360	
Inlet	1	Hamilton County		
Inman	1	Franklin County	12968	
Interlaken	1	Seneca County	14847	
Interlaken Beach	1	Seneca County	14847	
International Junction	1	Erie County	14223	
Invale	1	Allegany County	14739	
Inverness	1	Livingston County		
Inwood	1	Nassau County	11696	
Inwood	1	New York County	10034	
Inwood L I	1	Nassau County	11696	
Ionia	1	Onondaga County		
Ionia	1	Ontario County	14475	
Ira	1	Cayuga County	13033	
Ira	1	Cayuga County		
Ira Station	1	Cayuga County	13033	
Ireland Corners	1	Ulster County	12525	
Irelandville	1	Schuyler County	14891	
Irish Settlement	1	Herkimer County		
Irish Settlement	1	St. Lawrence County	13625	
Irishtown	1	Essex County		
Irona	1	Clinton County	12910	
Irondale	1	Dutchess County		
Irondale	1	Herkimer County		
Irondequoit	1	Monroe County		
Irondequoit	1	Monroe County	14617	
Irondequoit Manor	1	Monroe County	14617	
Iron Furnace	1	Washington County		
Irongate	1	Onondaga County	13088	
Ironsides	1	Onondaga County		
Ironton	1	St. Lawrence County		
Ironville	1	Essex County	12928	
Iroquois	1	Erie County		
Irvine Mills	1	Cattaraugus County		
Irving	1	Chautauqua County	14081	
Irvington	1	Westchester County	10533	
Ischua	1	Cattaraugus County	14743	
Ischua	1	Cattaraugus County		
Island	1	New York County	10040	
Island Cottage Beach	1	Monroe County	14612	
Islandia	1	Suffolk County	11722	
Island Park	1	Nassau County	11558	
Isle of San Souci	1	Westchester County	10805	
Islip	1	Suffolk County	11751	
Islip	1	Suffolk County		
Islip Manor	1	Suffolk County	11751	
Islip Terrace	1	Suffolk County	11752	
Italy	1	Yates County	14512	
Italy	1	Yates County		
Italy Hill	1	Yates County		
Itaska	1	Broome County	13862	
Ithaca	1	Tompkins County	14850	
Ithaca	1	Tompkins County		
Ithaca College	1	Tompkins County	14850	
Ithaca Junction	1	Cayuga County	13021	
Ivanhoe	1	Delaware County	13839	
Ives Hollow	1	Herkimer County		
Ives Settlement	1	Chenango County		
Ivory	1	Chautauqua County	14738	
