= Salisbury Center, New York =

- Hamlet and CDP
- Location within New York Location within the United States
- Coordinates: 43°08′33″N 74°47′12″W
- Country: United States
- State: New York
- County: Herkimer
- Town: Salisbury

Area
  - Total: 0.92 sq mi (2.38 km^{2})
  - Land: 0.92 sq mi (2.37 km^{2})
  - Water: 0.0039 sq mi (0.01 km^{2})
- Elevation: 1,073 ft (327 m)
- Time zone: UTC-5 (Eastern (EST))
  - Summer (DST): UTC-4 (EDT)
- ZIP Codes: 13454 (Salisbury Center); 13329 (Dolgeville)

Salisbury Center is a hamlet (and census-designated place) located in the Town of Salisbury in Herkimer County, New York, United States. Salisbury Center has a post office with zip code 13454. As of the 2020 census, Salisbury Center had a population of 323.

New York State Route 29 and New York State Route 29A intersect in the CDP, with NY 29A having its western terminus at the intersection.

== Education ==
It is in the Dolgeville Central School District.
