= James Michael Newell =

American artist

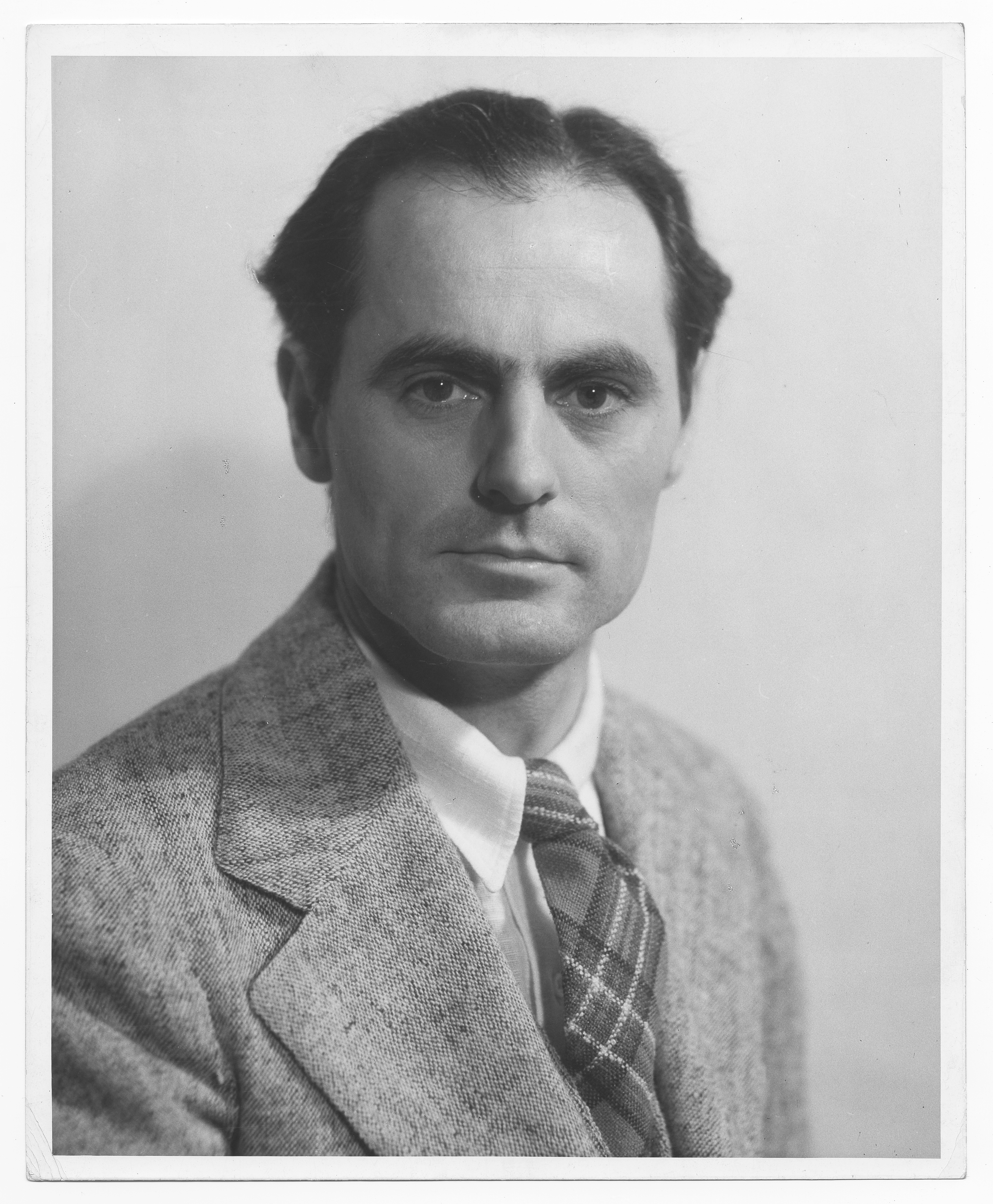
- Born: February 21, 1900; Carnegie, Pennsylvania, United States
- Died: 1985
- Education: Académie Julian, École des Beaux-Arts
- Known for: Muralist

James Michael Newell (February 21, 1900 – December 1985) was a gold medaled WPA artist, best known for his fresco murals. He was born in Carnegie, Pennsylvania into a large Irish family. His birth name was James Erbin Newell but he changed it when becoming an artist. He had one child with his first wife, Emma Greaves. His daughter Patricia Ann Newell was born in 1927. His work was also part of the painting event in the art competition at the 1932 Summer Olympics.

== Life ==
James Newell was given a scholarship from a Colonel Mills to study in Paris, France. Newell studied painting at Académie Julian, and then fresco at Beaux-Arts. While in Paris Newell met an art student, Mardy Allen, who later became his second wife. The two researched Renaissance frescoes in Italy. In 1930 Newell assisted La Montagne St. Hubert on frescoes in the American dormitory at La Cité universitaire in Paris.

James Michael Newell was commissioned by Potomac Electric Power Company to paint murals in lobbies of Washington D.C. offices. During the late 1930s, Newell worked under the Public Works of Art Project (PWAP), and the Federal Art Project (one of the divisions of the WPA created under Federal Project One), painting eight murals titled "The History of Western Civilization", at Evander Childs High School in 1938. Newell's additional works include "Alaska" and "Insular Possessions" done in the year 1939. In 1940, Newell was commissioned by the Section of Fine Arts of Federal Works Agency to paint "The Underground Railroad", in the Dolgeville, NY post office. In the same year, Newell painted an oil on canvas named "The Death of Pere Marquette" in the U.S. Post Office in Des Plaines, Illinois.

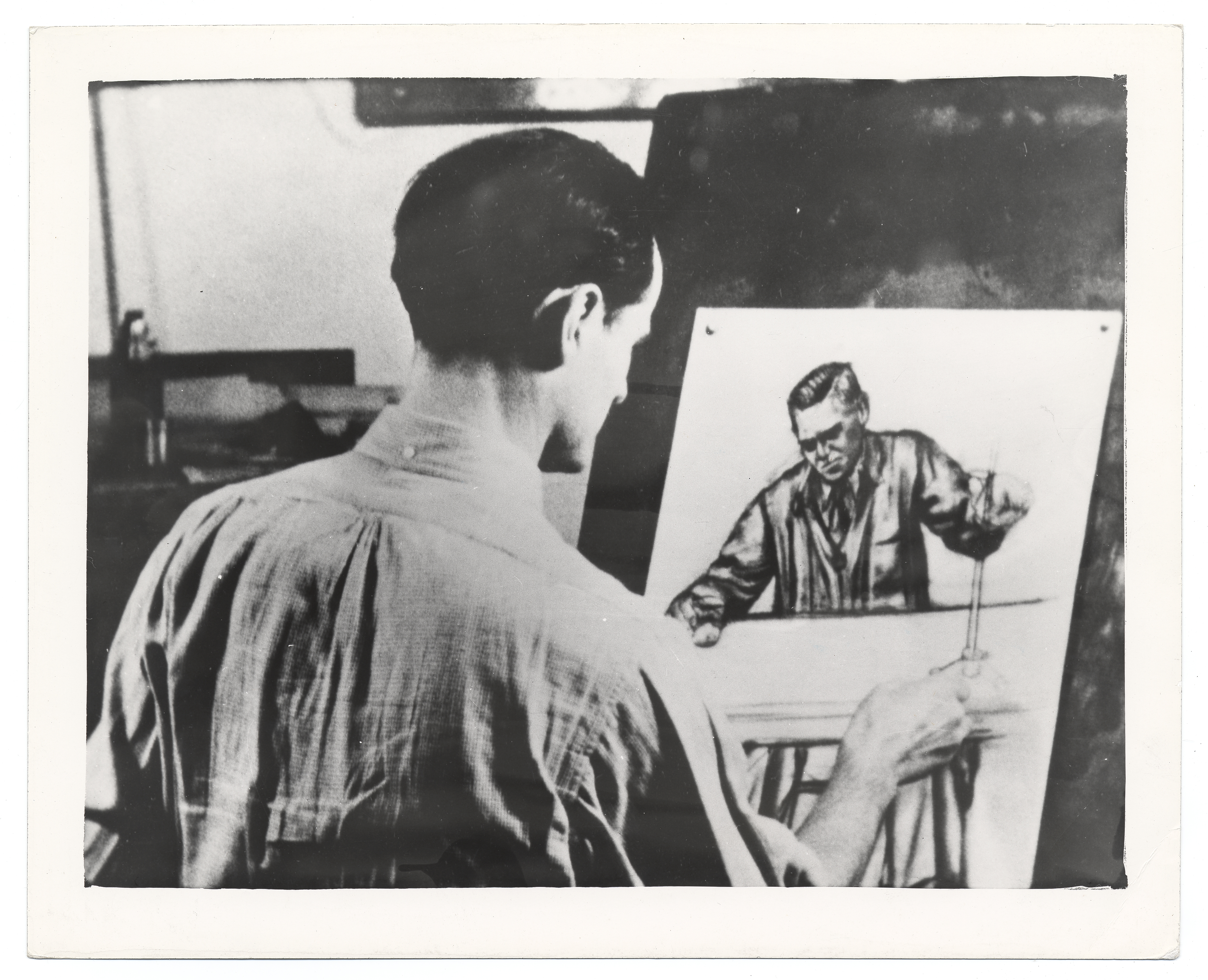
Newell at work on a mural for the Works Progress Administration, ca. 1935

Often compared to Diego Rivera's murals, Newell depicted the social scene of his nation. His works have been exhibited and placed in permanent collections at the Museum of Modern Art (MOMA, NYC), the Smithsonian, the White House, the Metropolitan Museum of Art (NYC) and other major institutions. A film based on his work in frescoes is in use by the Metropolitan Museum, other museums and universities throughout the country. In addition, his murals, selected by President and Mrs. Roosevelt have been the focus in films highlighting the art of the WPA.
