= John Neulinger =

German-American psychologist

- John Neulinger circa 1989
- Born: 26 April 1924; Dresden, Germany
- Died: 20 June 1991 (aged 67); Dolgeville, New York, USA
- Education: Hunter College; New York University
- Known for: Leisure model, leisure lack, universal leisure society
- Scientific career
- Fields: Social psychology Leisure studies
- Workplaces: City College of New York; Society for the Reduction of Human Labor

John Neulinger (April 26, 1924 – June 20, 1991) was a German-American psychologist and Professor Emeritus of psychology at City College of New York. Neulinger is best known for contributing a social psychological theory of leisure to the field of leisure studies.

Neulinger's theory of leisure is defined by a psychological state of mind that requires perceived freedom and intrinsic motivation. Individuals are at leisure if they perceive that they have the freedom to choose activities and are motivated by an activity for its own sake, not just for its consequences. Neulinger first popularized his ideas in the 1974 book, The Psychology of Leisure.

== Early life ==
Neulinger was born in Dresden, Germany to Rudolf and Julie Neulinger née Konirsch. At least two siblings are known, a brother Kurt and a sister, Liselotte. Neulinger attended the Staatsoberrealgymnasium in Děčín, Czechoslovakia as a child, but was taken to a Nazi concentration camp during World War II. His experience in Nazi Germany influenced his psychological theories regarding the connection between freedom and leisure in the same way as psychologist Viktor Frankl.

Having survived the war, Neulinger became a naturalized citizen in the United States. Neulinger attended Hunter College and graduated in 1960. He received his doctorate in psychology from New York University in 1965. Neulinger married Josephine Levitus on July 22, 1950, and later had one son, Ronald. In 1970 the couple divorced. He later married fellow psychologist Gabrielle Stutman.

== Career ==
From 1964 to 1965, Neulinger was a research associate for the Russell Sage Foundation in New York City. After 1967, he spent the rest of his life working at the City College of the City University of New York: as an assistant professor from 1967 to 1971; an associate professor from 1972 to 1976; and finally as a professor of psychology from 1977 to 1986.

In the late 1960s, Neulinger and Miranda Breit were one of the first leisure researchers to use attitudinal data instead of participation data to define activity clusters. They published their attitudinal analysis as "Attitude Dimensions of Leisure" in the Journal of Leisure Research.

Neulinger was a member of the International Sociological Association, the American Psychological Association, the Gerontological Society, and Phi Beta Kappa. He helped found the Academy of Leisure Sciences and was president of the academy from 1982 to 1983. Neulinger was Director of the Leisure Institute in his home town of Dolgeville, New York, and helped found and chaired the Society for the Reduction of Human Labor.

== Leisure theory ==
"Leisure is a state of mind; it is a way of being, of being at peace with oneself and what one is doing...Leisure has one and only one essential criterion, and that is the condition of perceived freedom. Any activity carried out freely without constraint or compulsion, may be considered to be leisure. To leisure implies being engaged in an activity as a free agent, and of one's own choice."

— John Neulinger, in The Psychology of Leisure (1974)

Neulinger's leisure theory, sometimes referred to as the Neulinger paradigm, was first published in his 1974 book, The Psychology of Leisure. The theory is a continuum model of leisure, with the criterion a condition Neulinger calls perceived freedom. This perceived freedom is a state of mind where one freely chooses to perform an activity—any activity—because one "wants to do it". If an individual is involved in an activity that offers only intrinsic reward and perceived freedom, that person is said to be at leisure. However, if the activity involves only extrinsic reward and the absence of perceived freedom, leisure is not present. Neulinger described six states: Pure leisure, leisure-work, leisure-job, pure work, work-job, and pure job.

Neulinger's theory of leisure argued that intrinsic motivation and perceived freedom can directly change the perception of leisure. But, like other social psychological theories of leisure, Neulinger's theory was criticized for its lack of "discriminant power". The criterion of perceived freedom is not exclusive to leisure activities, and the failure of the theory to account for the differences between real freedom and the illusion of freedom was challenged. Nevertheless, Neulinger's theory exerted considerable influence on the social theory of leisure, and perceived freedom is still a popular concept in leisure studies.

Neulinger believed that human civilization could one day look forward to a society based on leisure, a leisure society where technology and science free the average person from concern over subsistence. Neulinger envisioned a world where the very concept of a "job" was no longer plausible, where work would be leisure-oriented. Neulinger's vision was of a society where non-leisure activities form a minimal part of our day, where work would be carried out with meaning and without coercion, freely chosen, self-rewarding, and intrinsically motivating. In his final publication, Neulinger advocated for a societal transformation to that of a "universal leisure society instead of more centuries of useless destruction and worldwide conflicts".

== Death ==
Neulinger died at home of a heart attack at the age of 67 on June 20, 1991, in Dolgeville, New York. Since his death, colleagues in the field of leisure studies have referred to Neulinger as a "leisure visionary".

== Publications ==
=== Books ===
- Neulinger, John (1981) [1974]. The Psychology of Leisure. Springfield, Illinois: Charles C. Thomas. ISBN 0-398-03106-1.
- Neulinger, John (1986) [1977]. What Am I Doing? The WAID. Dolgeville, New York: Leisure Institute.
- Neulinger, John (1981). To Leisure: An Introduction. Boston: Allyn and Bacon. ISBN 0-205-06936-3.
- Neulinger, John (1990). Road to Eden After All: A Human Metamorphosis. Leisure Institute. ISBN 90-5013-014-3.

=== Articles ===
- Brim, Orville G.; John Neulinger; D. C. Glass (1965). "Experiences and Attitudes of American Adults concerning Standardized Intelligence Tests". Technical Report No. 1 on the Social Consequences of Testing. New York: Russell Sage Foundation.
- Neulinger, John; Miranda Breit (Summer 1969). "Attitude Dimensions of Leisure". Journal of Leisure Research. 1 (3): 255–261. doi:10.1080/00222216.1969.11969737.
- Neulinger, John; Miranda Breit (Spring 1971). "Attitude Dimensions of Leisure: A Replication Study". Journal of Leisure Research. 3 (2): 108–115. doi:10.1080/00222216.1971.11970019.
- Neulinger, John (Jul 1971). "Leisure and Mental Health: A Study in a Program of Leisure Research". The Pacific Sociological Review. 14 (3). University of California Press: 288–300. doi:10.2307/1388643. JSTOR 1388643. S2CID 149489413.(subscription required)
- Glass, David C.; John Neulinger; Orville G. Brim, Jr. (1974). "Birth Order, Verbal Intelligence, and Educational Aspiration". Child Development. 45 (3). Blackwell Publishing: 807–811. doi:10.2307/1127851. JSTOR 1127851. PMID 4143834.(subscription required)
- Neulinger, John (1979). "Leisure: A State of Mind That All Desire but Few Achieve". In Hillel Ruskin (ed.). Leisure, Toward a Theory and Policy: Proceedings of the International Seminar on Leisure Policies, Jerusalem, 11–14 June 1979. Fairleigh Dickinson University Press. pp. 172–181. ISBN 0-8386-3134-7.
- Neulinger, John; Steven Kopor (Spring–Summer 1981). "Leisure Experienced by an Intellectual Elite: A Survey of the Mensa Society". Mensa Research Journal. 10 (17). Mensa Education and Research Foundation: 25–33.
- Neulinger, John (Jan 1982). "Leisure Lack and the Quality of Life: The Broadening Scope of the Leisure Professional". Leisure Studies. 1 (1). Routledge: 53–63. doi:10.1080/02614368200390051.

== See also ==
- Sebastian de Grazia, (contemplation theory of leisure)
- Seppo Iso-Ahola, (optimal arousal theory of leisure)
- Mihaly Csikszentmihalyi, (flow theory of leisure)
- Post-work society
