= Salisbury Center Grange Hall =

- U.S. National Register of Historic Places
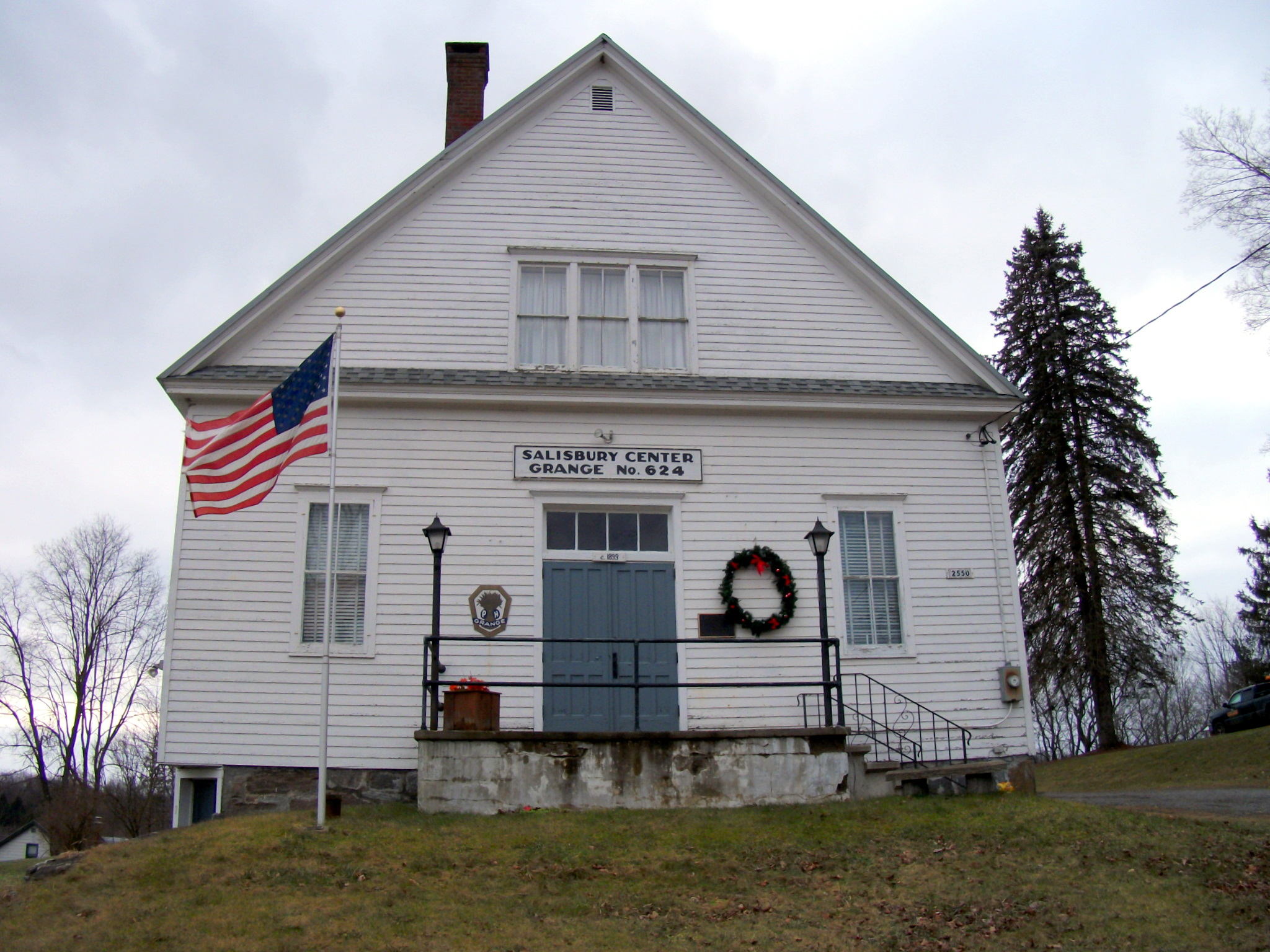
- Salisbury Center Grange Hall, January 2011

- Location within New York Location within the United States
- Location: 2550 NY 29, Salisbury Center, New York
- Coordinates: 43°8′32″N 74°47′18″W
- Area: less than one acre
- Built: 1929
- NRHP reference No.: 99000056
- Added to NRHP: February 12, 1999

Salisbury Center Grange Hall is a historic Grange Hall located at Salisbury Center in Herkimer County, New York. It was built in 1899 and occupied by the Salisbury Center Grange No. 624 since 1929. It is a 2 1/2-story, gable-roofed, vernacular frame structure. It is sheathed in clapboard siding and rests on a foundation of fieldstone and concrete.

It was listed on the National Register of Historic Places in 1999.
