= United States Post Office (Dolgeville, New York) =

- US Post Office-Dolgeville
- U.S. National Register of Historic Places
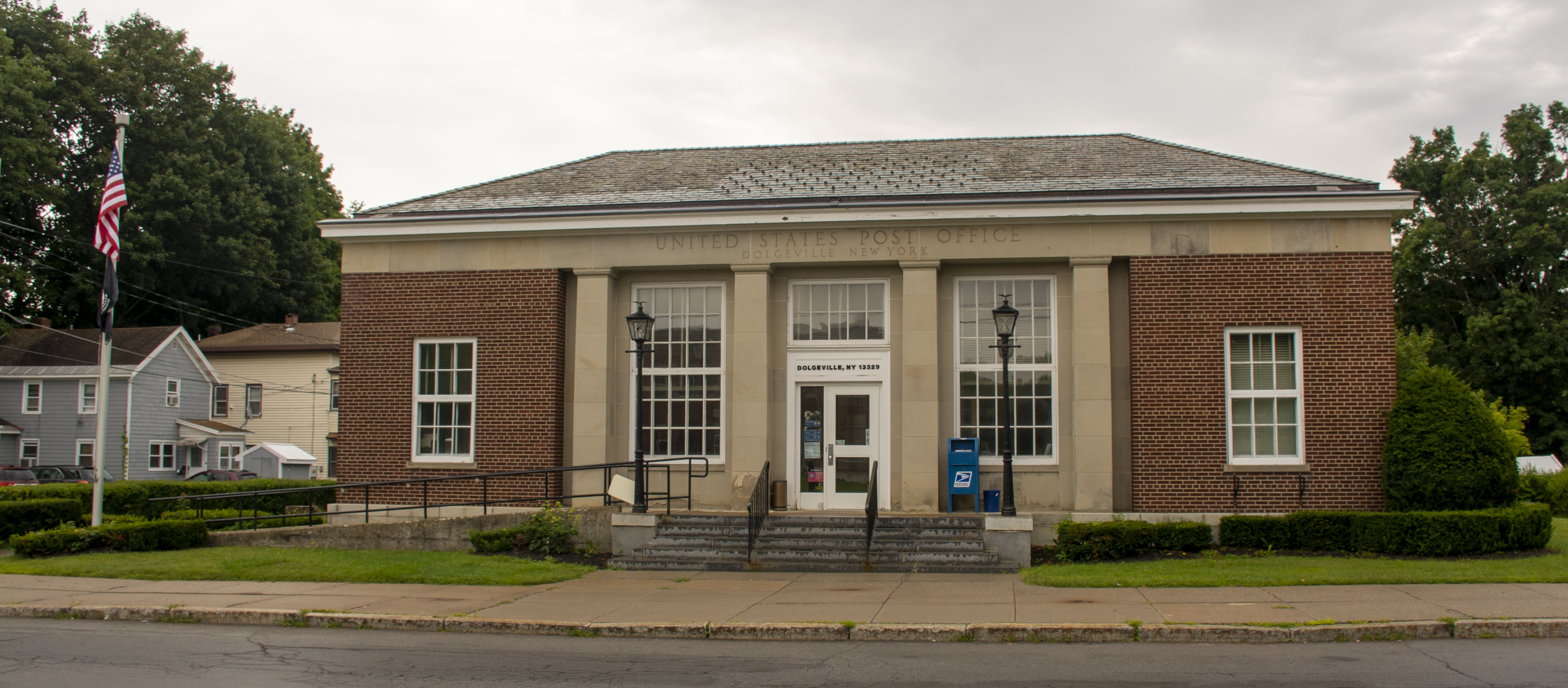

- Location within New York Location within the United States
- Interactive map showing the location of the U.S. Post Office-Dolgeville
- Location: 41 S. Main St. Dolgeville, New York
- Coordinates: 43°6′1″N 74°46′22″W
- Area: less than one acre
- Built: 1939
- Architect: Simon, Louis A.
- Architectural style: Colonial Revival
- MPS: US Post Offices in New York State, 1858-1943, TR
- NRHP reference No.: 88002486
- Added to NRHP: November 17, 1988

US Post Office-Dolgeville is a historic post office building located at Dolgeville in Herkimer County, New York, United States. It was built in 1939–1940, and is one of a number of post offices in New York State designed by the Office of the Supervising Architect of the Treasury Department, Louis A. Simon. It is a one-story, five bay building with a granite clad foundation, brick facades laid in common bond, and limestone trim in the Colonial Revival style. It features a slate-covered hipped roof on the front section. The interior features a 1940 fresco by artist James Michael Newell titled "Underground Railroad."

It was listed on the National Register of Historic Places in 1988.
