= Salisbury (hamlet), Herkimer County, New York =

Salisbury, New York
- Hamlet
- Location within New York Location within the United States
- Coordinates: 43°08′03″N 74°49′27″W
- Country: United States
- State: New York
- County: Herkimer
- Town: Salisbury
- Elevation: 1,220 ft (372 m)
- Time zone: UTC-5 (Eastern (EST))
  - Summer (DST): UTC-4 (EDT)

Salisbury is a hamlet located in the Town of Salisbury in Herkimer County, New York, United States.
