= Menge House Complex =

Historic house in New York, United States

- U.S. National Register of Historic Places
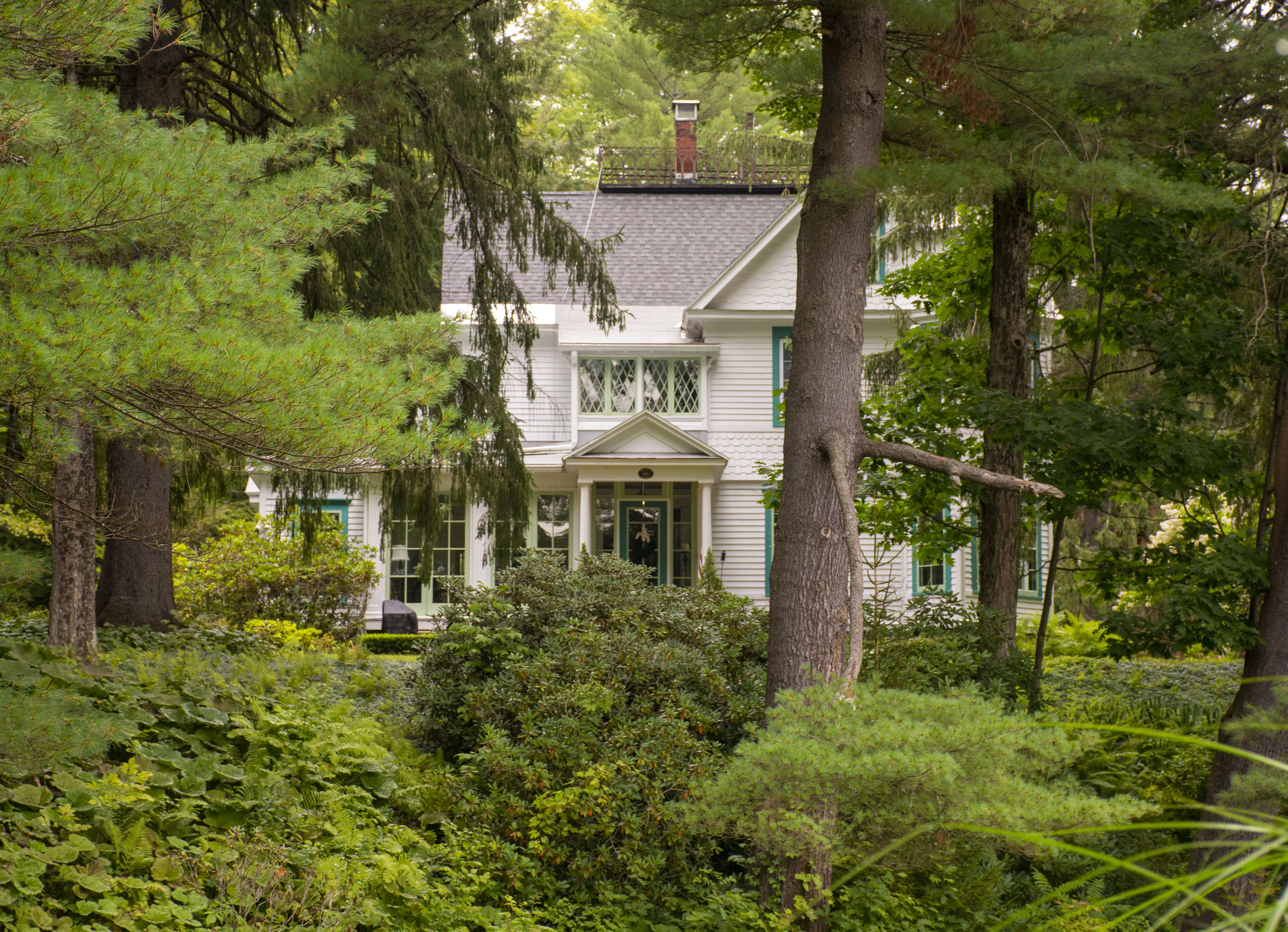

- Location within New York Location within the United States
- Location: 98 Van Buren St. Dolgeville, New York
- Coordinates: 43°5′38″N 74°46′12″W
- Area: 4.8 acres (1.9 ha)
- Built: 1893
- Architect: Adolph Wegner
- Architectural style: Queen Anne
- NRHP reference No.: 96001425
- Added to NRHP: December 16, 1996

Menge House Complex is a historic home located at Dolgeville in Herkimer County, New York. It was built in 1893 and is a 2 1/2-story, asymmetrically massed Queen Anne–style frame on a stone foundation. It features an engaged corner tower with a pyramidal roof. Also on the property is a carriage house/garage, woodshed, and a stone and wrought iron arched gate bearing the name "Menge."

It was listed on the National Register of Historic Places in 1996.
