= Roselle, Missouri =

Unincorporated community in Missouri, U.S.

Coordinates: 37°35′58″N 90°31′33″W

Roselle is an unincorporated community in northwest Madison County, in the U.S. state of Missouri.

The community is situated on Missouri Route 72, approximately 13 miles west of Fredericktown and five miles east of Ironton. Stouts Creek flows past the south of the community and the St. Francis River is about 1.5 miles east.

== History ==
A post office called Roselle was established in 1895, and remained in operation until 1959. Some say the community was named after Roselle, a circus performer who paid the town a visit, while others believe the community's name is an amalgamation of Rose and Ella, the daughters of a pioneer citizen.
