= Breckwoldt-Ward House =

Historic house in New York, United States

- U.S. National Register of Historic Places
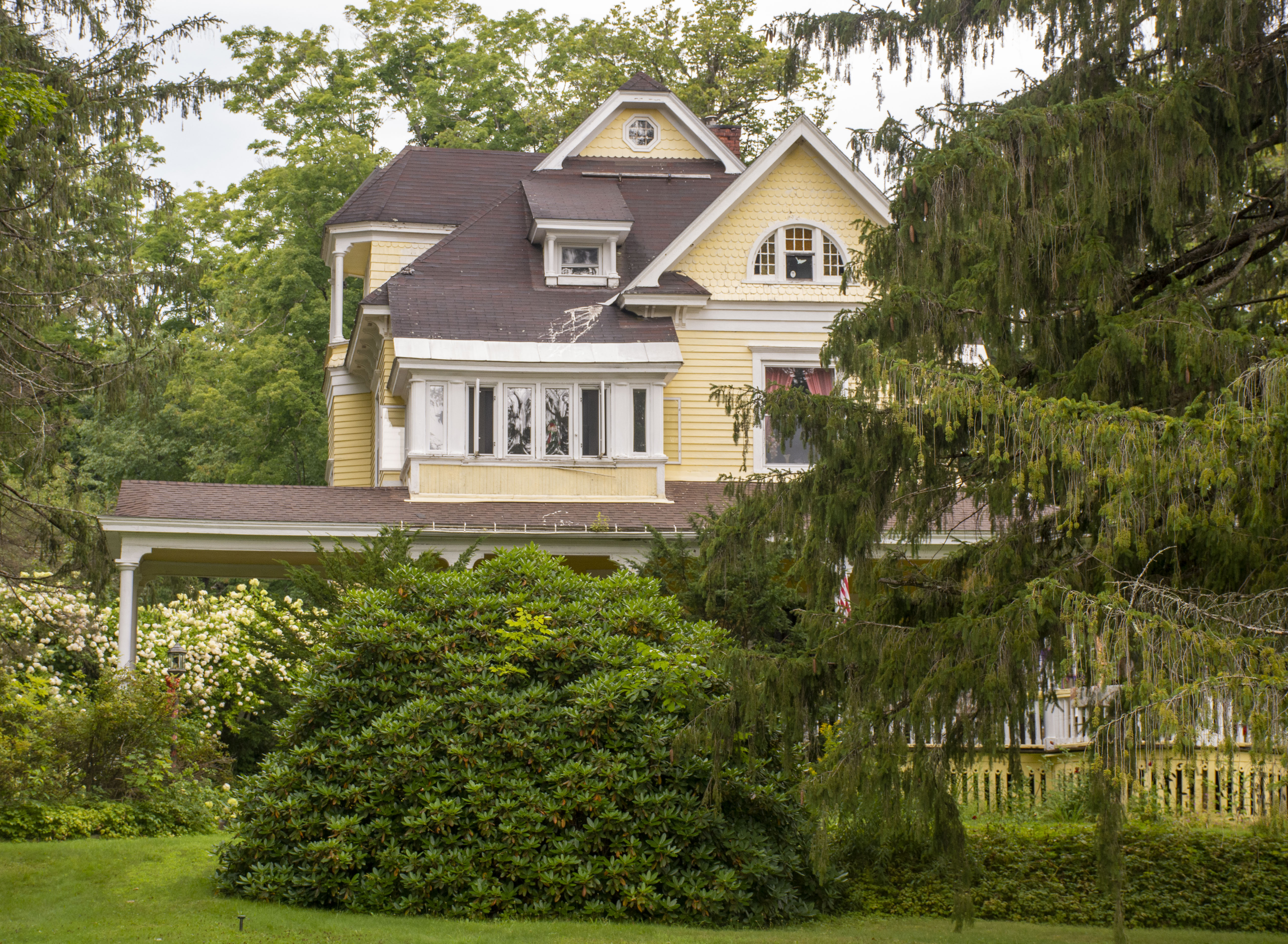

- Location within New York Location within the United States
- Location: 90 Van Buren St. Dolgeville, New York
- Coordinates: 43°5′41″N 74°46′10″W
- Area: 5 acres (2.0 ha)
- Built: 1893
- Architectural style: Queen Anne
- NRHP reference No.: 05000164
- Added to NRHP: March 15, 2005

The Breckwoldt-Ward House is a historic house located at 90 Van Buren Street in Dolgeville, Herkimer County, New York.

== Description and history ==
It was built in 1893, and is an asymmetrically massed, 2 1/2-story Queen Anne–style single family dwelling over a cut-stone foundation. Also on the property is a 1 1/2-story, gable-roofed carriage house/garage. From 1903 to 1918 it was owned by George Ward, successful prosecutor in the Chester Gillette murder trial of 1906.

It was listed on the National Register of Historic Places on March 15, 2005.

Currently, it is a private residence.
