= Augustus Frisbie House =

Historic house in New York, United States

- U.S. National Register of Historic Places
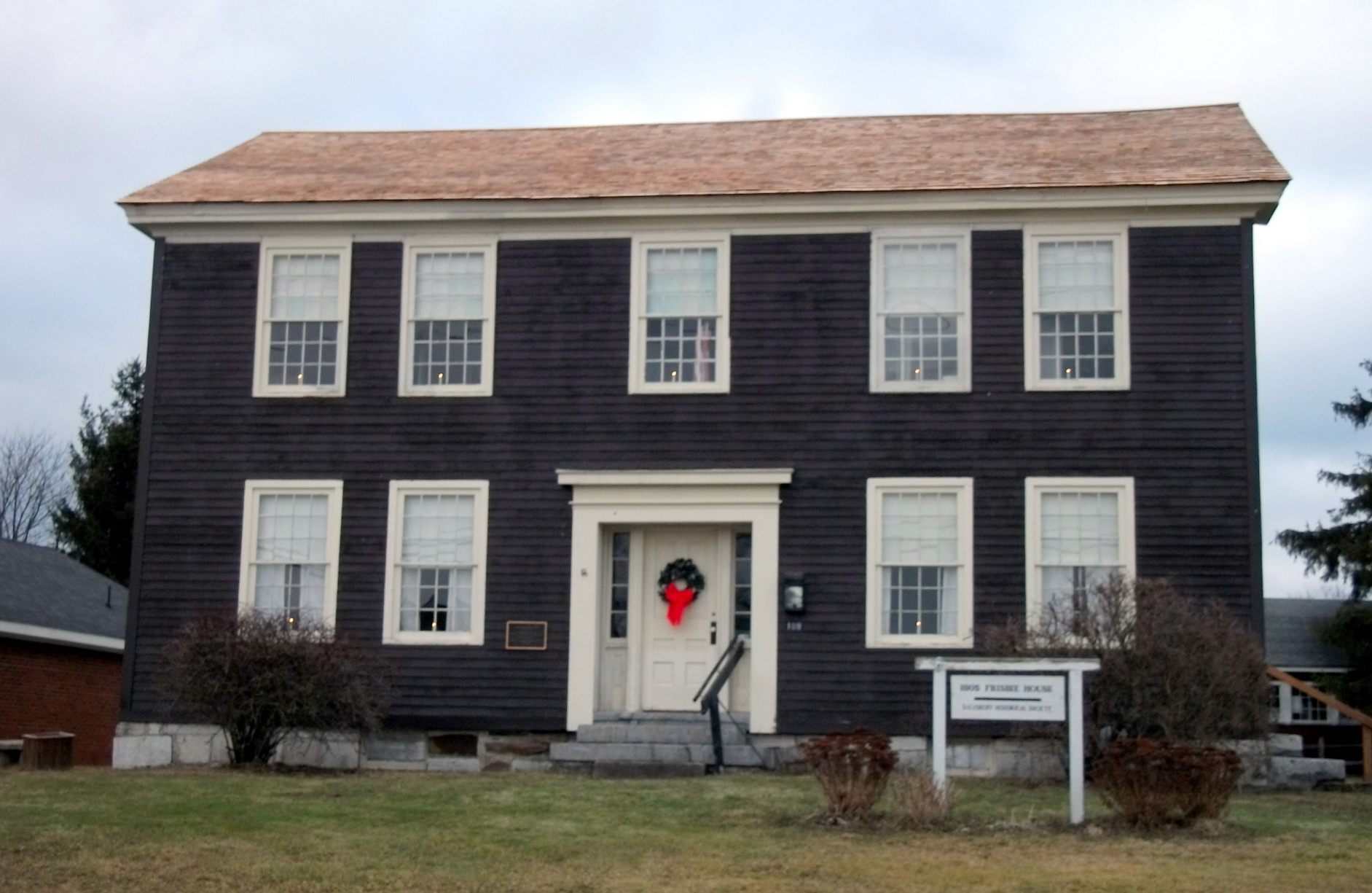
- Augustus Frisbie House, January 2011

- Location within New York Location within the United States
- Location: NY 29A, Salisbury Center, New York
- Coordinates: 43°8′34″N 74°47′13″W
- Area: less than one acre
- Built: 1805; 221 years ago
- Architect: Avery, Billious
- Architectural style: Federal
- NRHP reference No.: 99001487
- Added to NRHP: December 9, 1999; 26 years ago

Augustus Frisbie House is a historic home located at Salisbury Center in Herkimer County, New York. It was built in 1805 and is a two-story, five-bay, gable roofed frame residence with a one-story, gable roofed wing in the Federal style. The main block is over a cut limestone foundation above a full basement. It is preserved as a museum of local history by the Salisbury Historical Society.

It was listed on the National Register of Historic Places in 1999.
