= Ingham Mills, New York =

- Hamlet
- Location within New York Location within the United States
- Coordinates: 43°03′27″N 74°45′50″W
- Country: United States
- State: New York
- County: Fulton, Herkimer
- Towns: Oppenheim, Manheim
- Elevation: 518 ft (158 m)
- Time zone: UTC-5 (Eastern (EST))
  - Summer (DST): UTC-4 (EDT)

Ingham Mills is a hamlet located in the Town of Oppenheim in Fulton County and partially in the Town of Manheim in Herkimer County, New York, United States. It was founded in 1802 with the construction of grist and saw mills. Kyser Lake is located north of Ingham Mills.
