= Dolge Company Factory Complex =

Historic district in New York, United States

- U.S. National Register of Historic Places
- U.S. Historic district
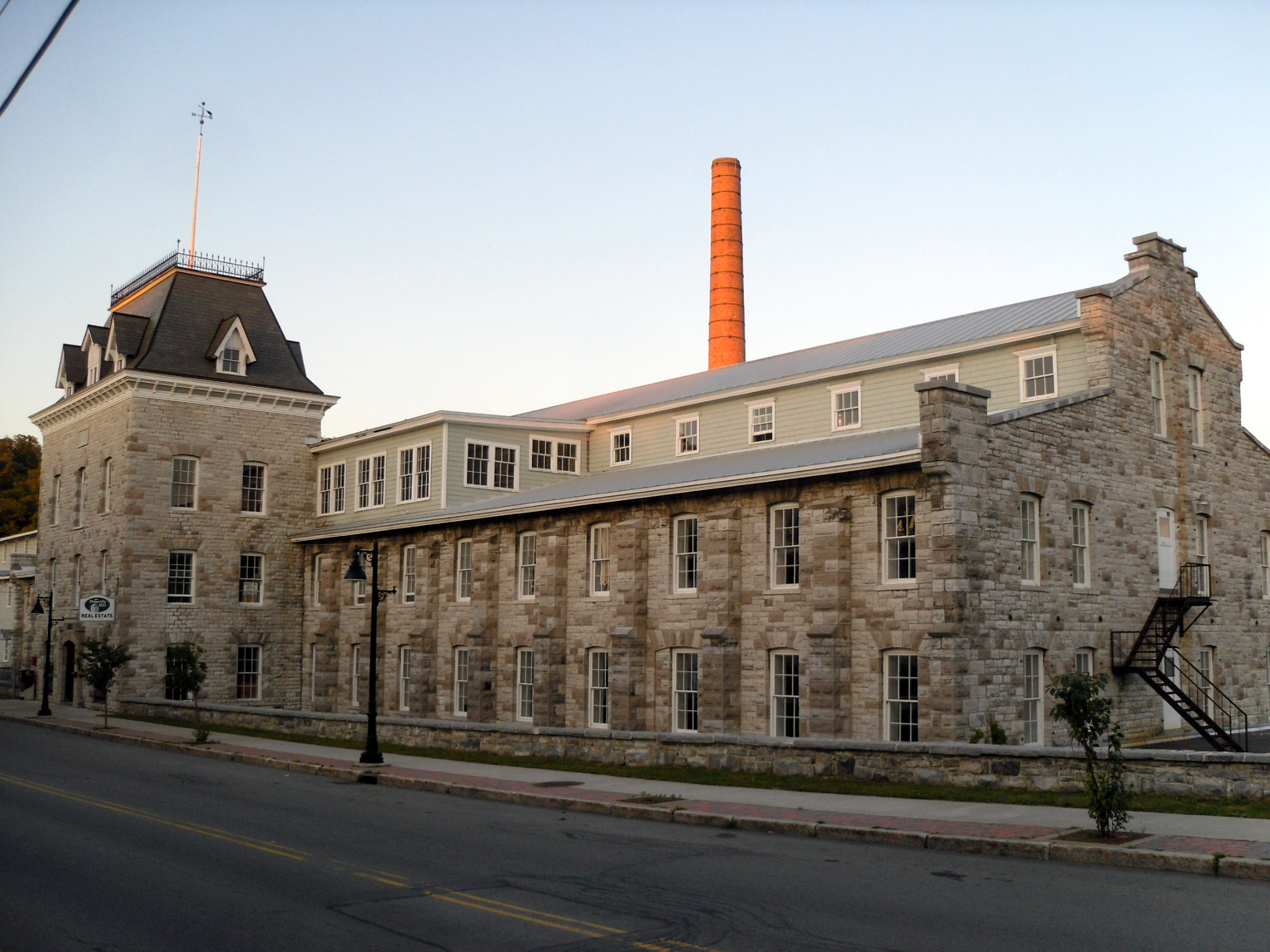
- Dolge Company Factory Complex, July 2010

- Location within New York Location within the United States
- Location: S. Main St., Dolgeville, New York
- Coordinates: 43°6′7″N 74°46′9″W
- Area: 17 acres (6.9 ha)
- Built: 1876
- Architectural style: Pratt Truss Bridge
- NRHP reference No.: 74001238
- Added to NRHP: September 17, 1974

Dolge Company Factory Complex, also known as Alfred Dolge and Sons Felt and Sounding Board Factories and Daniel Green Factory Complex, is a national historic district located at Dolgeville in Herkimer County, New York. The district contains 10 contributing buildings and one contributing structure. The complex includes a large limestone building built in 1886, a frame factory building, a double span Pratt truss bridge on limestone and concrete supports (1887), another large wood factory building, a complex of lesser buildings, and the Alfred Dolge mansion (1895). The limestone factory structure is a long (300 by 700) feet, 3 1/2-story structure with a clerestory running the length of the roof ridge. It features a mansard roofed tower with dormers. The East Canada Creek runs through the complex.

The complex was built by Alfred Dolge (1848–1922), who desired to establish an ideal society for his factory workers. In the 1890s the complex was acquired by Daniel Green and William R. Green, who manufactured felt shoes and slippers. It was listed on the National Register of Historic Places in 1974. In late 2014 the Dolge mansion was destroyed in a fire.

== Gallery ==
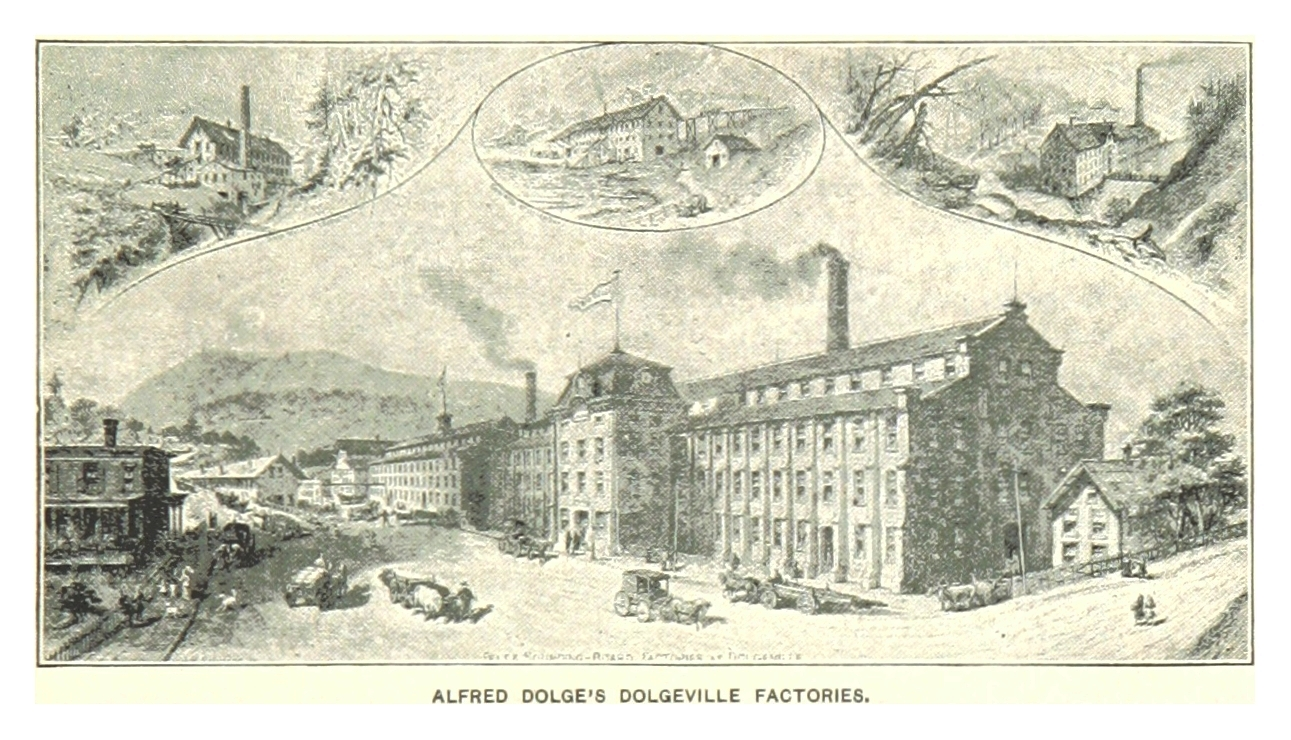
Dolge Company Factory Complex, 1893

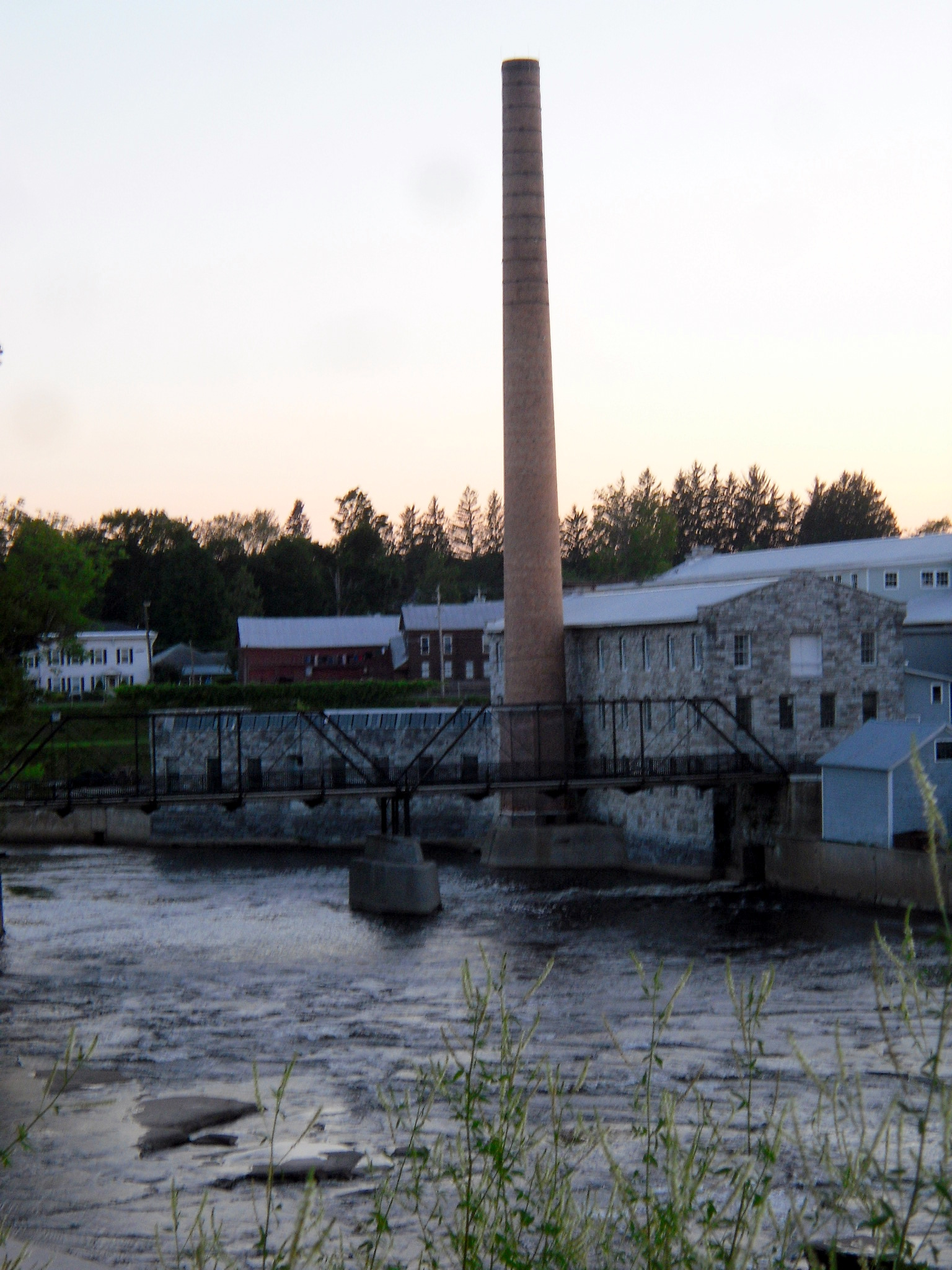
Dolge Company Factory Complex, July 2010

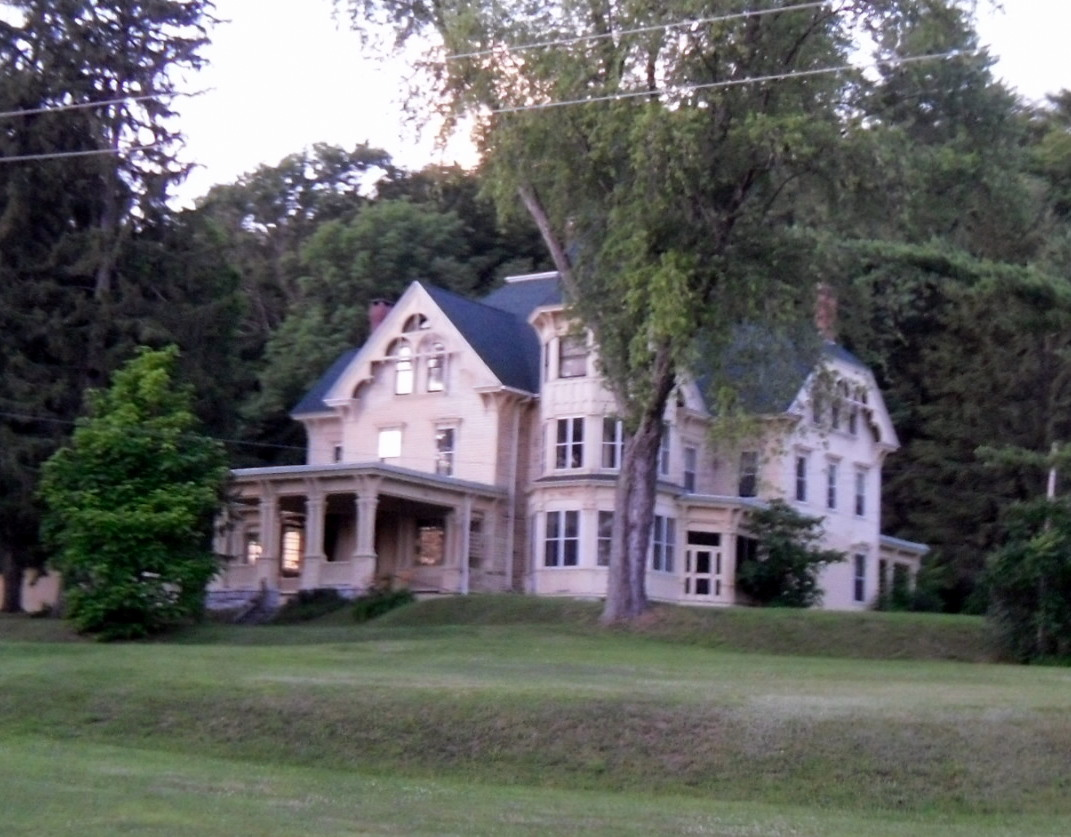
Alfred Dolge Mansion, July 2010
