= Alfred Dolge =

German-born American industrialist (1848-1922)

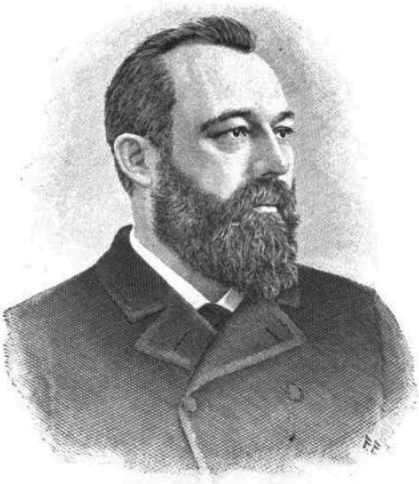
- Born: December 22, 1848; Chemnitz, Saxony
- Died: January 5, 1922 (aged 73); Milan, Italy
- Occupations: Industrialist, author
- Known for: Social reform

Alfred Dolge (December 22, 1848 – January 5, 1922) was a German-born industrialist, inventor, and author.

Originally an importer and manufacturer of piano materials he later founded his own factory, manufacturing felt products at Brockett's Bridge, Fulton County, New York, which in 1887 was renamed to Dolgeville, named after him.

== Biography ==
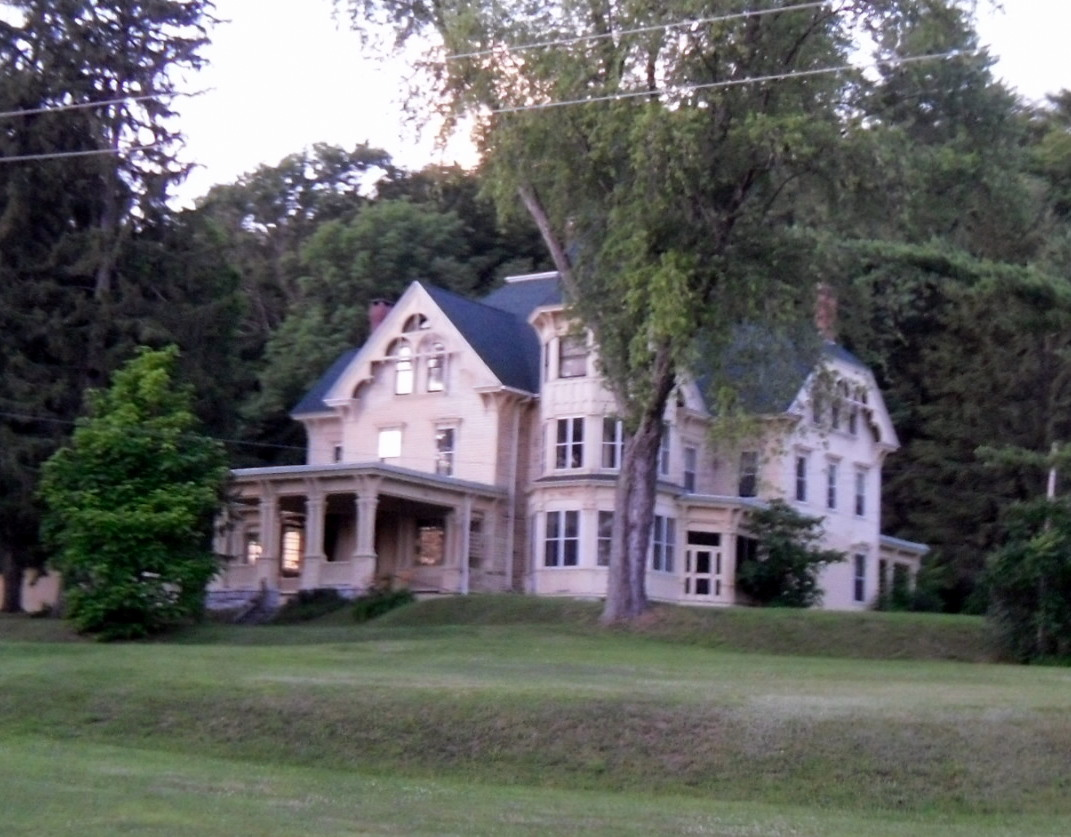
Dolge's mansion in Dolgeville, New York

Alfred Dolge was born December 22, 1848, in Chemnitz, Saxony. He attended public school in Leipzig until he was 17 when he entered his father's business, the A. Dolge and Co., Piano Manufacturers, as an apprentice. He pursued high school studies in a night school conducted by the Free Masons in Leipzig and received his diploma from them. He first came to the United States in 1865, when he was 17. He remained permanently in 1868 and worked in piano making and importing in New York City.

In 1874 Dolge went to Brockett's Bridge, Fulton County, New York, prospecting for spruce wood to be used for piano sounding boards. He purchased the old Herkimer County Tannery and in April 1875, he began manufacturing felt in it, later known as the Dolge Company Factory Complex. Within a few years Brockett's Bridge grew from 325 to over 2,000 inhabitants, many of whom were German immigrants, whom he had interested in the area by advertisements and agents. Eventually, Dolge built felt mills, made felt shoes, autoharps, piano cases, piano sounding boards, piano hammers, ran lumber yards, and contributed to the local physical infrastructure and educational needs. In 1881 the citizens unanimously petitioned the authorities at Washington to change the name of the place from Brockett's Bridge to Dolgeville, New York.

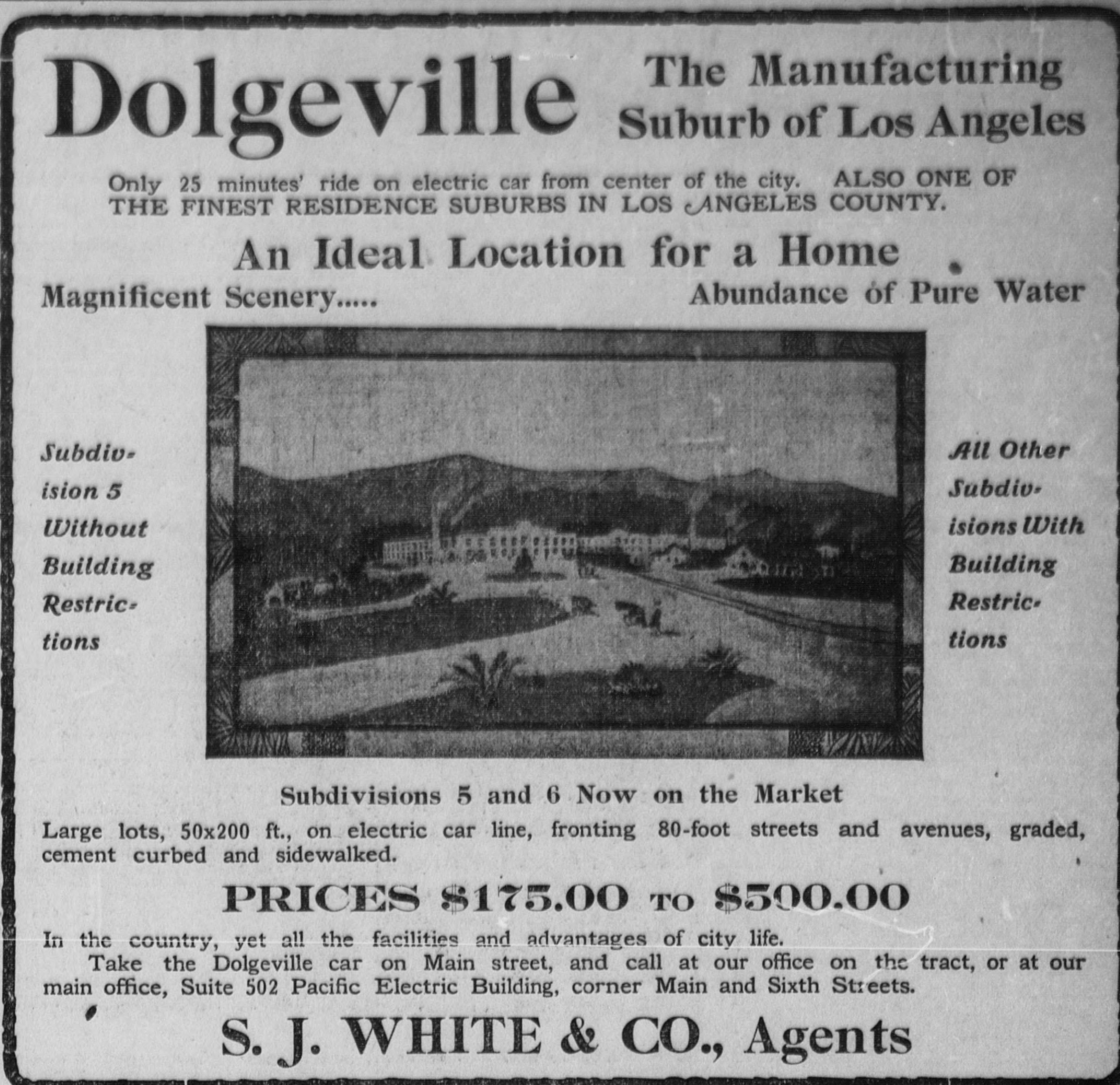
Advertisement for real estate in Dolgeville, Los Angeles

Dolge failed financially and left Dolgeville in May 1899. He partnered with Henry E. Huntington on a similar project in Los Angeles in 1903, also called Dolgeville; Huntington forced him out of the project in 1910. In 1912 he was reported as living in Covina, California. He died in Milan, Italy on January 5, 1922, on a round the world tour. His ashes are interred in the Dolgeville, New York cemetery.

== Philosophy ==
Inspired by his early readings of Liebknecht, Marx, Mill, and Adam Smith, Dolge instituted at Dolgeville a form of what we now call social security in his attempt to create an idealistic socialistic utopia. About 1876, when the factory was first well established, Dolge began to set up his Pension Plan which remained almost exactly the same throughout his tenure. It was extremely generous, ranging from 50 percent of wages for disability after 10 years service up to 100 percent after 25 years.

Later he added a system of life insurance paid for by the firm. He also instituted a program of Earning-Sharing whereby an employee received a portion of the earnings according to his contribution in brains or the value of his work. This was not to be turned over until retirement, but was to be reinvested. The Pension Plan was non-contributory by the employee. The employer paid all. When Dolge's business failed in 1899, few of the benefits which he had envisioned had been paid, but the ideas which he pioneered proved to be very lasting. His ideas gained worldwide attention. The government of Germany officially requested details of his Plan and adopted it with some changes. In 1889, the government of France asked for a detailed account. The insurance, pension and endowment plans instituted by Dolgeville were also copied and adapted by railroads and many other corporations in America.

== Books ==
In 1896, he printed a 243-page paperbound book entitled The Practical Applications of Economic Theories in the Factories of Alfred Dolge and Son. In 1911 he published a book on the development of the piano in Europe, America, Russia and Japan. Volume II followed in 1913.

== Legacy ==
Because of Dolge, Dolgeville had the:

- first Social Security, 1876
- first felt slipper and shoes made in America, 1881
- Edison's second electric dynamo and first run by water power, 1879
- first public kindergarten in New York State, 1889
- first park system in the Dolgeville area, 1876
- first upstate village lighted by electricity, Dolgeville 1891

== Family ==
Dolge's son William was born in 1879 in New York City. He became an accountant and sat on the finance committee for the city of San Francisco.
