= Manheim, New York =

- Town
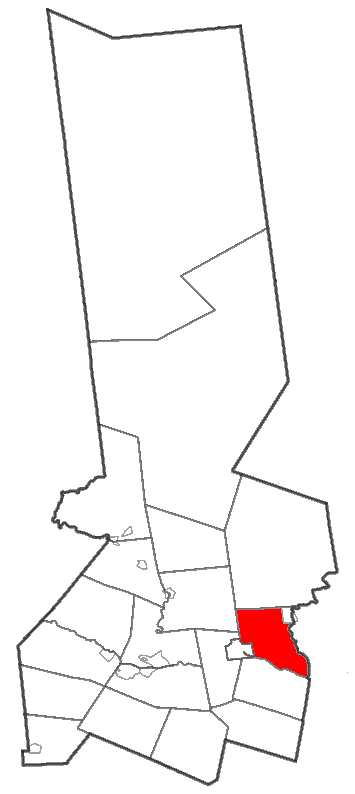
- Location of Manheim in Herkimer County

- Location within New York Location within the United States
- Coordinates: 43°4′N 74°48′W
- Country: United States
- State: New York
- County: Herkimer

Government
  - Type: Town Council
  - Town Supervisor: John D. Haughton (R)
  - Town Council: Members' List: • Larry B. Austin (R); • Peter Jaikin (R); • Kevin Snell (R); • Frederick Doerrer (R)

Area
  - Total: 29.69 sq mi (76.90 km^{2})
  - Land: 29.14 sq mi (75.46 km^{2})
  - Water: 0.56 sq mi (1.44 km^{2})
- Elevation: 738 ft (225 m)

Population (2010)
  - Total: 3,334
  - Estimate (2019): 3,166
  - Density: 110.5/sq mi (42.68/km^{2})
- Time zone: UTC-5 (Eastern (EST))
  - Summer (DST): UTC-4 (EDT)
- ZIP Codes: 13329 (Dolgeville); 13365 (Little Falls)
- Area code: 315
- FIPS code: 36-043-44974
- GNIS feature ID: 0979191
- Website: townofmanheim.gov

Manheim is a town in Herkimer County, New York, United States. The population was 3,334 at the 2010 census. The town name is derived from Mannheim in Baden, Germany.

The town is in the southeastern part of the Herkimer County and is bordered to the southwest by the city of Little Falls. The village of Dolgeville is in the northeastern corner of the town. Manheim is east of Utica.

The Mohawk River forms the southern border of the town.

== History ==
The town was first settled around 1756 by natives of German states.

In 1780, during the American Revolution, Loyalists and native allies attacked settlements in the town.

Manheim was formed from the town of Palatine (Montgomery County) in 1797.

In 1865, the population of Manheim was 1,831.

The Snells Bush Church and Cemetery was added to the National Register of Historic Places in 2004.

== Geography ==
According to the United States Census Bureau, the town of Manheim has a total area of 29.7 square miles (76.9 km^{2}), of which 29.2 square miles (75.5 km^{2}) are land and 0.54 square miles (1.4 km^{2}), or 1.88%, are water.

The eastern town line is the border of Fulton County, marked by East Canada Creek. The southern town line is marked by the Mohawk River.

New York State Route 5 is an east–west highway in the southern part of the town. New York State Route 167 and New York State Route 170A are north–south highways. NY-170A is in the northwest part of Manheim, and NY-167 connects Little Falls to Dolgeville.

== Demographics ==
Historical population
Census	Pop.	Note	%±
1820	1,777		—
1830	1,937		9.0%
1840	2,095		8.2%
1850	1,902		−9.2%
1860	1,868		−1.8%
1870	2,000		7.1%
1880	2,421		21.1%
1890	2,078		−14.2%
1900	2,648		27.4%
1910	3,355		26.7%
1920	3,886		15.8%
1930	3,831		−1.4%
1940	3,748		−2.2%
1950	3,897		4.0%
1960	3,872		−0.6%
1970	3,752		−3.1%
1980	3,634		−3.1%
1990	3,527		−2.9%
2000	3,171		−10.1%
2010	3,334		5.1%
2019 (est.)	3,166		−5.0%
U.S. Decennial Census

As of the census of 2000, there were 3,171 people, 1,297 households, and 885 families residing in the town. The population density was 109.2 inhabitants per square mile (42.2/km^{2}). There were 1,480 housing units at an average density of 51.0 per square mile (19.7/km^{2}). The racial makeup of the town was 97.86% White, 0.35% African American, 0.47% Native American, 0.38% Asian, 0.03% Pacific Islander, 0.06% from other races, and 0.85% from two or more races. Hispanic or Latino of any race were 0.69% of the population.

There were 1,297 households, out of which 30.8% had children under the age of 18 living with them, 51.7% were married couples living together, 10.4% had a female householder with no husband present, and 31.7% were non-families. 27.8% of all households were made up of individuals, and 14.9% had someone living alone who was 65 years of age or older. The average household size was 2.43 and the average family size was 2.92.

In the town, the population was spread out, with 24.7% under the age of 18, 7.7% from 18 to 24, 25.2% from 25 to 44, 25.8% from 45 to 64, and 16.7% who were 65 years of age or older. The median age was 40 years. For every 100 females, there were 93.7 males. For every 100 females age 18 and over, there were 91.5 males.

The median income for a household in the town was $31,750, and the median income for a family was $39,032. Males had a median income of $28,424 versus $18,264 for females. The per capita income for the town was $15,429. About 9.0% of families and 12.7% of the population were below the poverty line, including 15.2% of those under age 18 and 8.5% of those age 65 or over.

== Communities and locations in Manheim ==
- East Canada Lake – A small lake at the eastern town line.
- Dolgeville – The village of Dolgeville is in the northeastern corner of the town on NY-167.
- East Creek – A hamlet in the southeastern part of the town on NY-5 at County Road 42, by the Mohawk River.
- Five Mile Dam – A location by the Mohawk River.
- Garlock Corners – A location northwest of Manheim Center, on County Road 55.
- Ingham Mills – A hamlet at the eastern town line, south of Dolgeville. Partially in Town of Oppenheim in Fulton County. The community was founded in 1802 with the construction of grist and saw mills.
- Ingham Mills Station – A hamlet southeast of Manheim Center on County Road 42.
- Kyser Lake – A small lake north of Ingham Mills.
- Manheim Center – A hamlet in the south-central part of the town on NY-167.
- Ransom Creek – A stream entering the northern end of Kyser Lake.
