= Spectacle Lake (New York) =

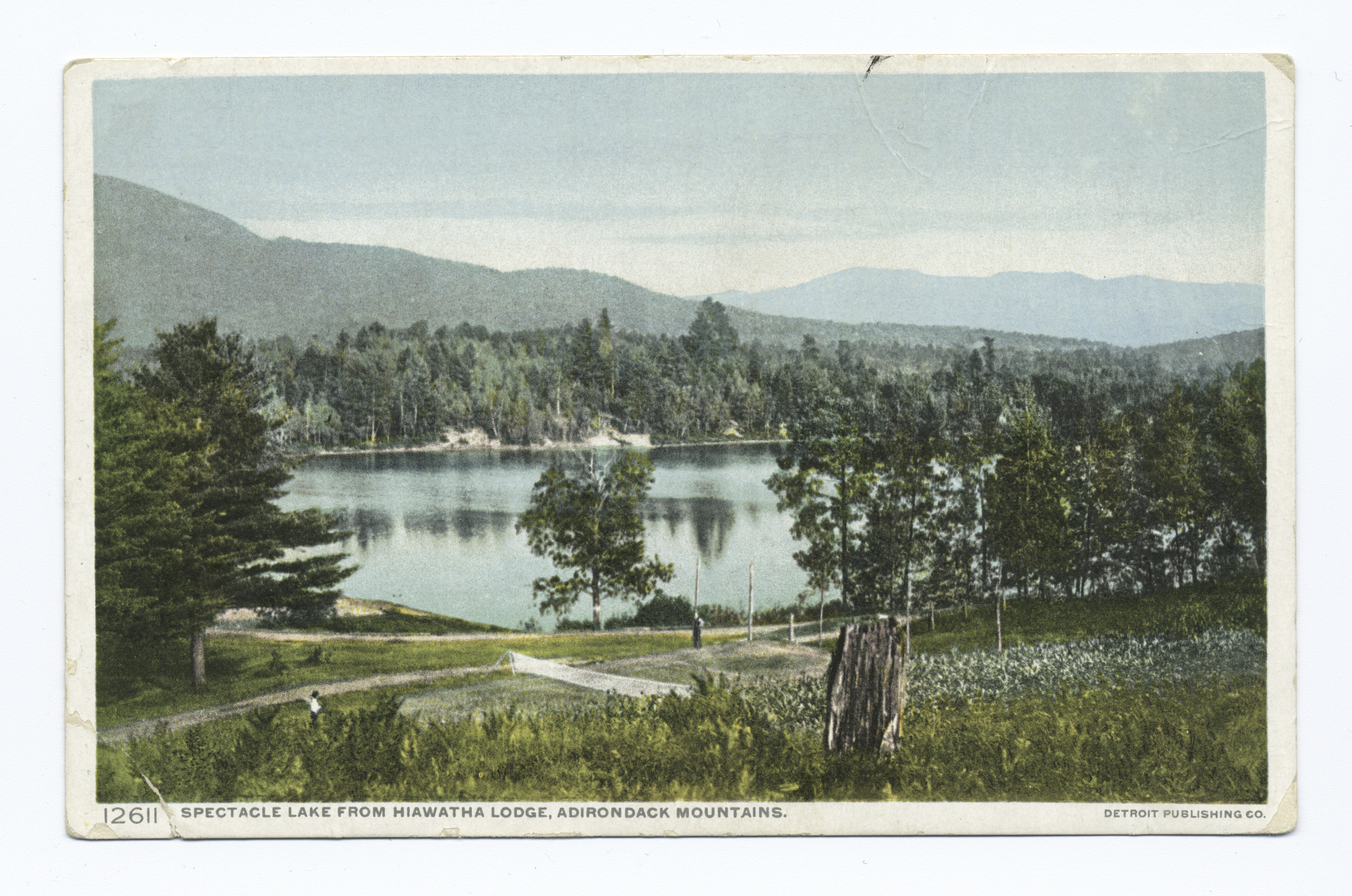

- Location within New York Location within the United States
- Location: Fulton County, Hamilton County, New York, United States
- Coordinates: 43°14′22.92″N 74°34′46.92″W
- Type: Lake
- Primary outflows: Spectacle Outlet
- Basin countries: United States
- Surface area: 165 acres (0.67 km^{2})
- Average depth: 12 feet (3.7 m)
- Max. depth: 46 feet (14 m)
- Shore length^{1}: 4.3 miles (6.9 km)
- Surface elevation: 1,729 feet (527 m)
- Islands: 2
- Settlements: Stratford, New York
- ^{1} Shore length is not a well-defined measure.

Spectacle Lake is located northeast of Stratford, New York. Fish species present in the lake are chain pickerel, black bullhead, yellow perch, and pumpkinseed sunfish. There is carry down access via trail off NY-10 and a second off NY-29A. The largest island has a primitive campsite on it.
