= Knob Creek (Stouts Creek tributary) =

Stream in the U.Sl state of Missouri

Knob Creek is a stream in Iron and St. Francois counties in the U.S. state of Missouri. It is a tributary of Stouts Creek.

The stream headwaters arise on the west flank of Oak Mountain at an elevation of 1400 feet. The stream flows west-southwest to enter the adjacent valley near Lopez about one mile south of Middlebrook in the southwest corner of St. Francois County. The stream enters Iron County and turns south-southeast and flows past Pilot Knob and Ironton to its confluence with Stouts Creek.

The source area is at 37°39′14″N 90°37′59″W and the confluence is at 37°36′01″N 90°36′51″W.

Knob Creek was named for a summit along its course called Pilot Knob.

== See also ==
- List of rivers of Missouri
