= Alfred Dolge Hose Co. No. 1 Building =

- U.S. National Register of Historic Places
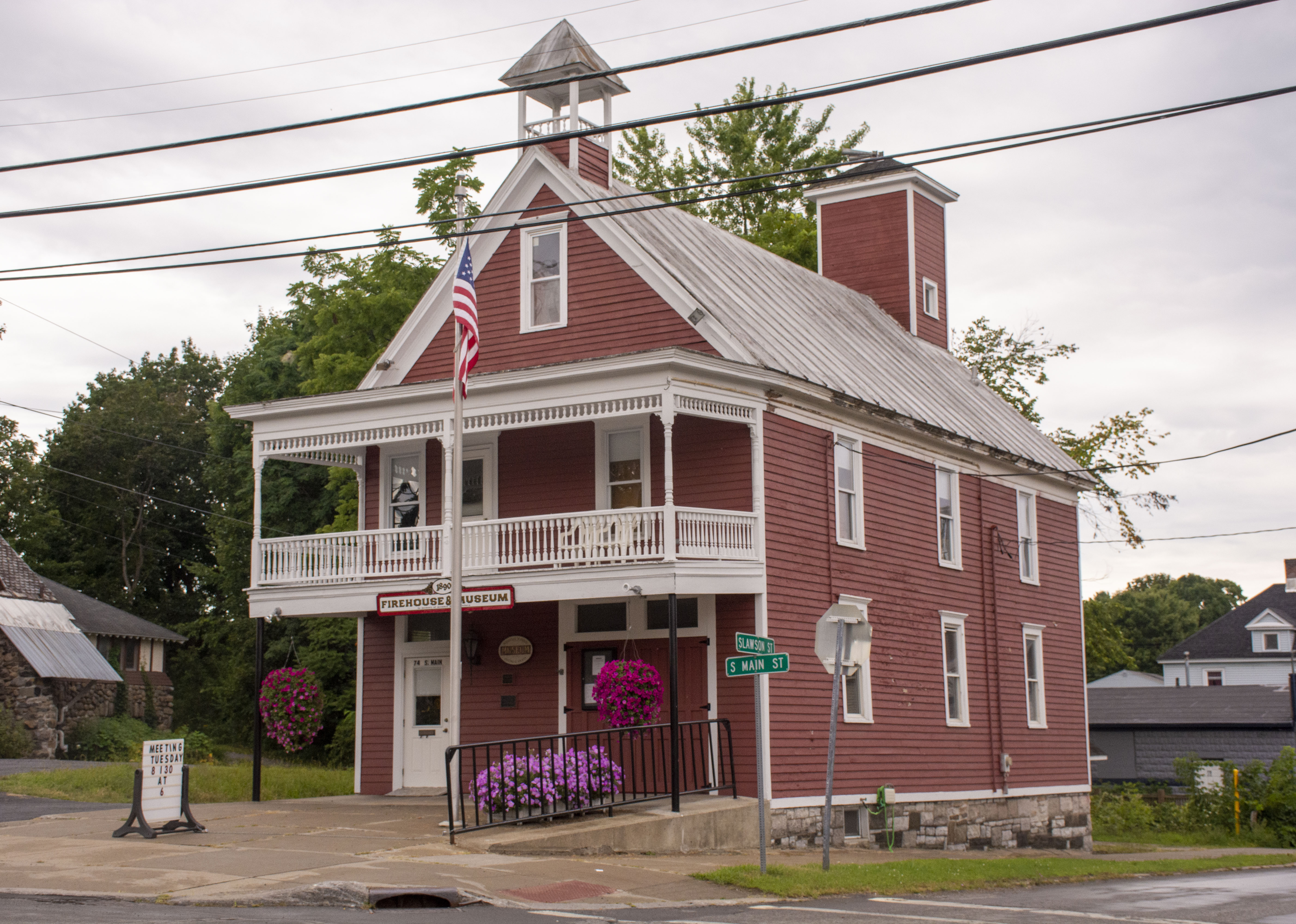

- Location within New York Location within the United States
- Location: Jct. of S. Main and Slawson Sts., SW corner, Dolgeville, New York
- Coordinates: 43°6′0″N 74°46′28″W
- Area: less than one acre
- Architectural style: Late Victorian
- NRHP reference No.: 94001003
- Added to NRHP: August 19, 1994

Alfred Dolge Hose Co. No. 1 Building is a historic fire station located at Dolgeville in Herkimer County, New York. It was built about 1890 and is a two-story, gable roofed, utilitarian frame structure above a cut stone basement. It features a steeply pitched, standing seam metal roof and open belfry with a pyramidal roof. It was originally built as a commercial structure, converted for use as a fire station in 1901, and used as such until 1991.

It was listed on the National Register of Historic Places in 1994.

The building is currently occupied by the Dolgeville-Manheim Historical Society.
