= Oak Mountain (Herkimer County, New York) =

Mountain in New York, United States

- Location within New York Location within the United States

Highest point
- Elevation: 1,968 feet (600 m)
- Coordinates: 43°12′21″N 74°43′45″W

Geography
- Location: NW of Stratford, New York, U.S.
- Topo map: USGS Stratford

Oak Mountain is a summit located in Central New York Region of New York located in the Town of Salisbury in Herkimer County, northwest of Stratford.
