= Snells Bush Church and Cemetery =

Historic site in Herkimer County, New York, US

- U.S. National Register of Historic Places
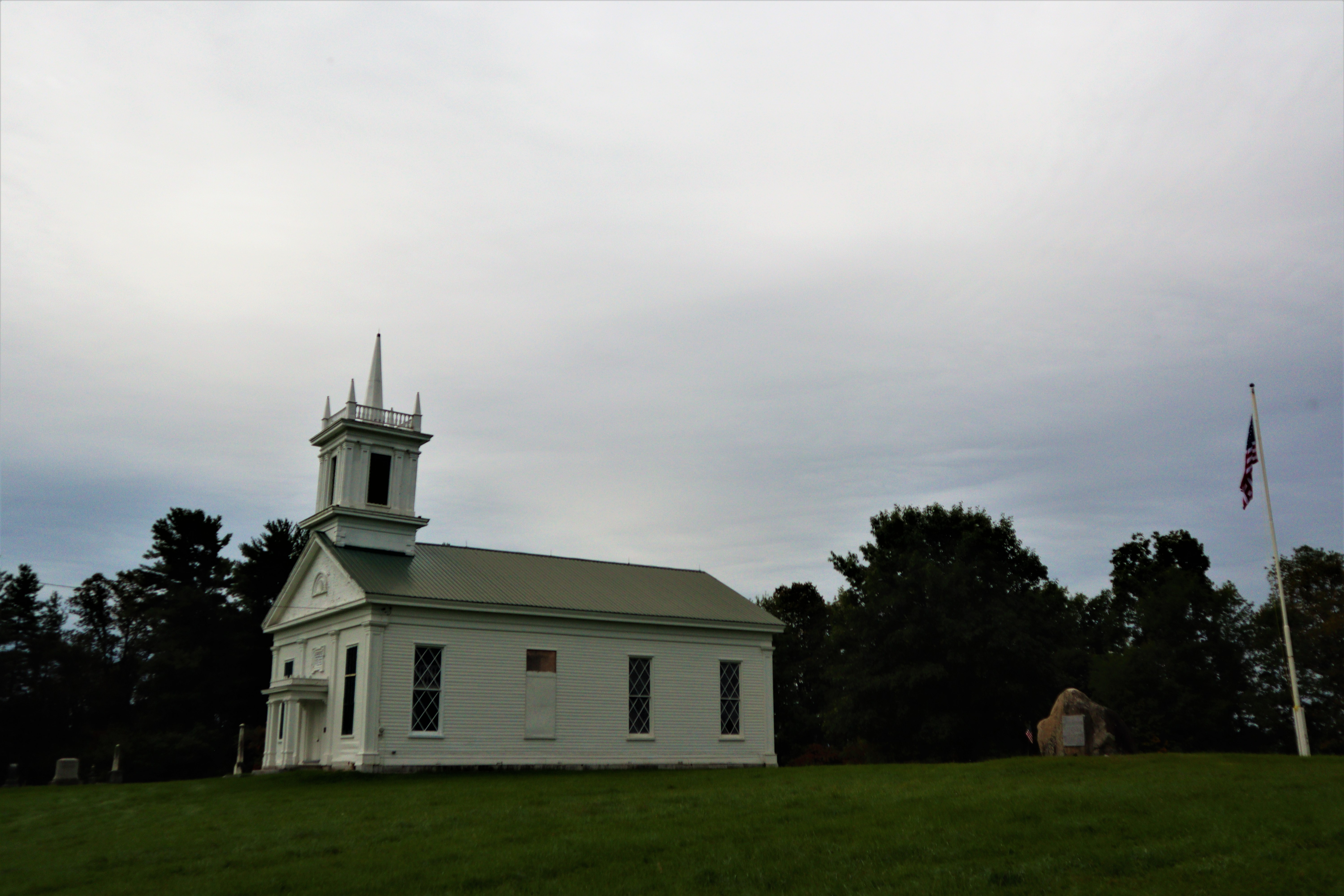

- Location within New York Location within the United States
- Location: Snells Bush Rd., Manheim, New York
- Coordinates: 43°2′18″N 74°46′26″W
- Area: 5.5 acres (2.2 ha)
- Architect: Perrine, Lewis
- Architectural style: Greek Revival
- NRHP reference No.: 04000092
- Added to NRHP: February 26, 2004

Snells Bush Church and Cemetery, also known as St. Paul's Dutch Reformed Church is a historic Dutch Reformed church located in Manheim, Herkimer County, New York. It was built in 1852, and is a one-story, rectangular, Greek Revival style timber frame church. The front gable roof is topped by a two-stage belfry. Adjacent to the church is the contributing cemetery containing 345 recorded burials. The earliest burial dates to 1804.

It was added to the National Register of Historic Places in 2004.
