= Oak Mountain (Missouri) =

Summit in the US state of Missouri

Coordinates: 37°38′50″N 90°37′37″W

Oak Mountain is a summit in the southwestern corner of St. Francois County in the U.S. state of Missouri. The summit has an elevation of 1,631 feet (497 m). The peak is on a north-south trending ridge that extends south into Iron County and the city of Pilot Knob lies just southwest of the mountain. The community of Middlebrook is to the northwest and Iron Mountain Lake is to the north. The source area of Knob Creek is on the west flank of the mountain.

Oak Mountain was so named on account of oak trees which grew there. A variant name was "Buzzard Mountain".
