= Buckner Branch =

Stream in the American state of Missouri

Coordinates: 37.583661°N 90.6501221°W

Buckner Branch is a stream in Iron County in the U.S. state of Missouri.

Buckner Branch has the name of Lewis Buckner, an early settler.

== See also ==
- List of rivers of Missouri
