= Kyser Lake =

- Location within New York Kyser Lake (the United States)
- Location: Herkimer County, New York
- Coordinates: 43°04′05″N 74°46′14″W
- Type: Reservoir
- Primary inflows: East Canada Creek, Ransom Creek
- Primary outflows: East Canada Creek
- Basin countries: United States
- Surface area: 153 acres (62 ha)
- Surface elevation: 656 ft (200 m)
- Settlements: Dolgeville

Kyser Lake is on the Herkimer County and Fulton County line, located south of Dolgeville, New York. East Canada Creek is the main inlet. Kyser Lake drains south via East Canada Creek which flows into the Mohawk River.
