= Stratford, New York =

- Town
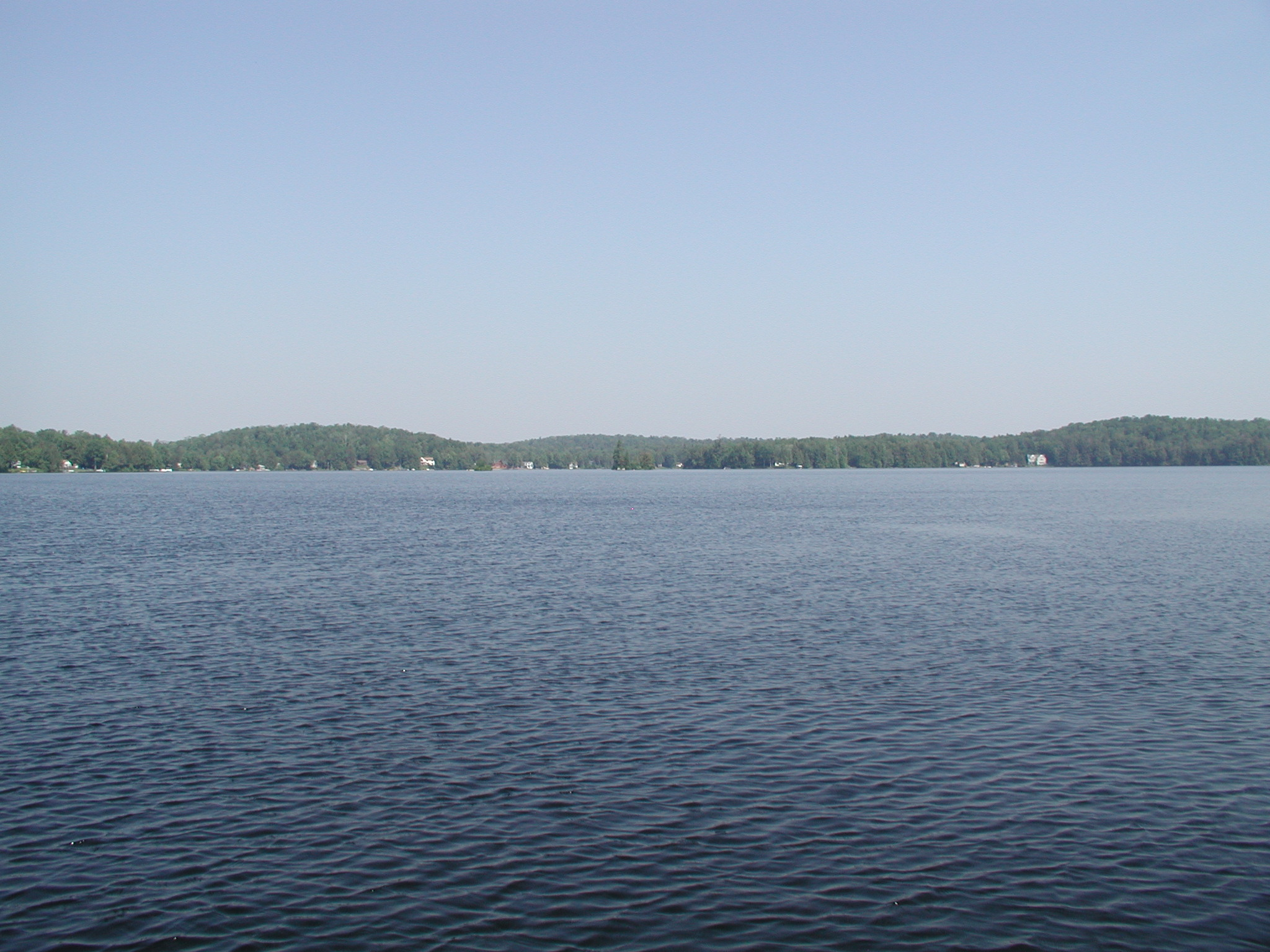
- Pleasant Lake, Stratford, NY

- Location within New York Location within the United States
- Coordinates: 43°10′45″N 74°39′7″W
- Country: United States
- State: New York
- County: Fulton

Government
  - Type: Town Council
  - Town Supervisor: Richard Fogarty (R)
  - Town Council: Members' List: • Todd N. Vedder (R); • Scott R. Seeley (R); • Lorraine Rumrill (R); • John Ploss (R)

Area
  - Total: 76.67 sq mi (198.58 km^{2})
  - Land: 74.88 sq mi (193.93 km^{2})
  - Water: 1.80 sq mi (4.65 km^{2})
- Elevation: 1,506 ft (459 m)

Population (2010)
  - Total: 610
  - Estimate (2016): 587
  - Density: 7.8/sq mi (3.03/km^{2})
- Time zone: UTC-5 (Eastern (EST))
  - Summer (DST): UTC-4 (EDT)
- ZIP Codes: 13470 (Stratford); 13329 (Dolgeville)
- Area code: 315
- FIPS code: 36-035-71784
- GNIS feature ID: 0979533
- Website: stratfordny.com

Stratford is a town in Fulton County, New York, United States. The population was 610 at the 2010 census. The town is in the northwestern corner of the county, northeast of the village of Dolgeville. It was named after Stratford, Connecticut.

== History ==
The town comprises patents of various pre-Revolutionary grants, including part of the extensive land grants of Sir William Johnson. Settlement began circa 1800, by settlers from Connecticut. The town was formed in 1805 from the town of Palatine while still part of Montgomery County. Part of the town was removed in 1842 to create part of the town of Caroga.

The population of Stratford was 353 in 1810.

== Notable residents ==
- Adolphus C. Bartlett (1844-1922), American businessman and philanthropist
- Harmon L. Remmel (1852-1927), German-American politician and businessman

== Geography ==
According to the United States Census Bureau, the town has a total area of 76.7 square miles (198.6 km^{2}), of which 74.9 square miles (193.9 km^{2}) is land and 1.8 square miles (4.6 km^{2}), or 2.34%, is water.

The northern town line is the border of Hamilton County, and the western town boundary is the border of Herkimer County, partially delineated by East Canada Creek. The town is in the Adirondack Park.

New York State Route 29A is an east-west highway in Stratford.

== Demographics ==
Historical population
Census	Pop.	Note	%±
1820	407		—
1830	552		35.6%
1840	500		−9.4%
1850	801		60.2%
1860	1,172		46.3%
1870	1,163		−0.8%
1880	1,066		−8.3%
1890	997		−6.5%
1900	830		−16.8%
1910	607		−26.9%
1920	453		−25.4%
1930	384		−15.2%
1940	401		4.4%
1950	464		15.7%
1960	421		−9.3%
1970	495		17.6%
1980	625		26.3%
1990	586		−6.2%
2000	640		9.2%
2010	610		−4.7%
2016 (est.)	587		−3.8%
U.S. Decennial Census

As of the census of 2000, there were 640 people, 237 households, and 167 families residing in the town. The population density was 8.5 inhabitants per square mile (3.3/km^{2}). There were 525 housing units at an average density of 7.0 per square mile (2.7/km^{2}). The racial makeup of the town was 97.19% White, 1.09% African American, 0.47% Native American, 0.31% from other races, and 0.94% from two or more races. Hispanic or Latino of any race were 1.56% of the population.

There were 237 households, out of which 31.6% had children under the age of 18 living with them, 54.4% were married couples living together, 8.4% had a female householder with no husband present, and 29.5% were non-families. 23.6% of all households were made up of individuals, and 11.0% had someone living alone who was 65 years of age or older. The average household size was 2.64 and the average family size was 3.08.

In the town, the population was spread out, with 24.2% under the age of 18, 6.4% from 18 to 24, 29.4% from 25 to 44, 26.4% from 45 to 64, and 13.6% who were 65 years of age or older. The median age was 41 years. For every 100 females, there were 114.0 males. For every 100 females age 18 and over, there were 115.6 males.

The median income for a household in the town was $27,813, and the median income for a family was $33,125. Males had a median income of $26,103 versus $20,526 for females. The per capita income for the town was $13,120. About 20.1% of families and 24.4% of the population were below the poverty line, including 34.8% of those under age 18 and 6.4% of those age 65 or over.

== Communities and locations in Stratford ==
- Ayers Creek – A stream flowing into the East Canada Creek at Stratford village.
- Ayers Lake – A lake north of Pleasant Lake.
- Bliss Corner – A hamlet southeast of Stratford village. It is named after one of the first settlers.
- Emmonsburg – A hamlet on the western town line by the East Canada Creek, located at the junction of County Roads 104 and 119. The community was formerly known as "Hart's Bridge" and "Whitesburg."
- Knappville – A hamlet north of Stratford village.
- Middle Sprite – A hamlet on the southern town line, taking its name from Middle Sprite Creek.
- Oregon – A hamlet in the northwestern section of the town, north of Knappville.
- Pleasant Lake – A lake in the eastern part of the town, north of NY-29A.
- Spectacle Lake – An irregularly shaped lake by the northern town line.
- Stewart Landing – A hamlet in the southeastern part of the town.
- Stratford – The hamlet of Stratford is located at the western town line on NY-29A. Part of the community is in the town of Salisbury in Herkimer County. It was once called "Deveraux" and "Nicholsville."
