= East Canada Creek =

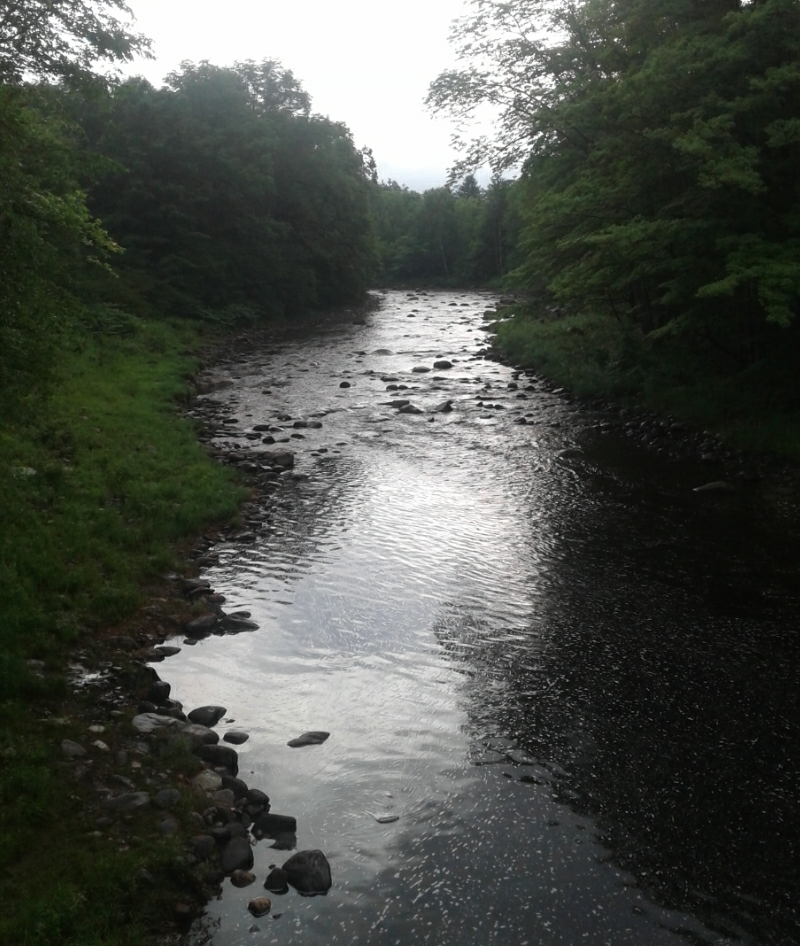
- East Canada Creek upstream of Emmonsburg Road

- Location of the mouth of East Canada Creek East Canada Creek (the United States)

Location
- Country: United States
- State: New York
- Regions: Central New York, North Country
- Counties: Hamilton, Fulton, Herkimer, Montgomery

Physical characteristics
- Source
  - location: Northeast of Powley Place
  - coordinates: 43°20′18″N 74°37′36″W
- Mouth: Mohawk River
  - location: South of East Creek
  - coordinates: 42°59′58″N 74°44′37″W
  - elevation: 305 ft (93 m)
- Length: 34.6 mi (55.7 km)
- Basin size: 289 sq mi (750 km^{2})

Basin features
- Tributaries
  - left: Sprite Creek

East Canada Creek is a 34.6-mile-long (55.7 km) river in upstate New York, United States. It is a tributary of the Mohawk River and flows southward from New York's Adirondack Park. The name "Canada" may be derived from the St. Lawrence Iroquoian word Kanata, meaning "village"; the name may also refer to the creek's importance as a trail to Canada in colonial times.

== Course ==
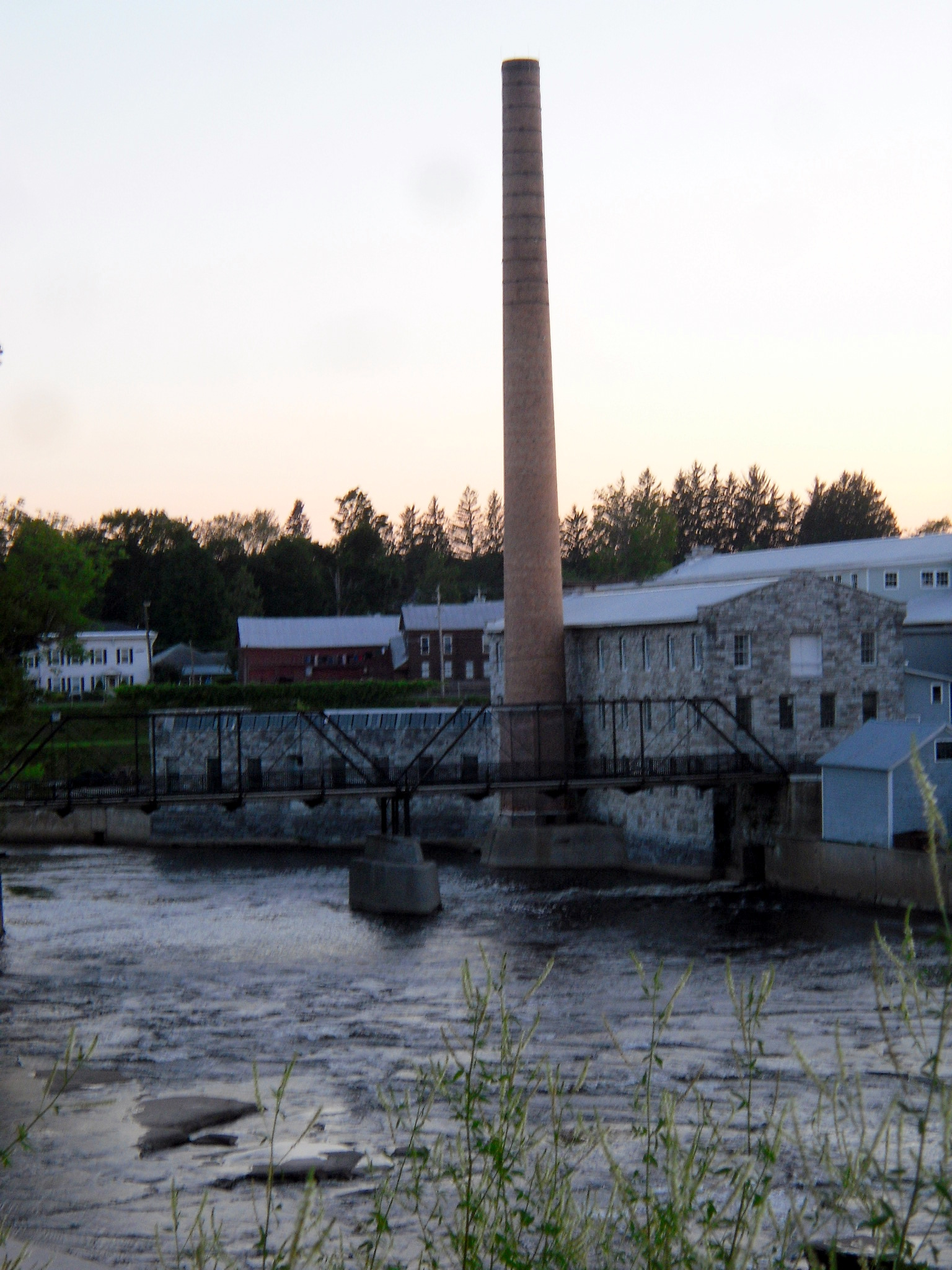
East Canada near the Dolge Company Factory Complex in Dolgeville

The creek is formed northeast of Powley Place in the Town of Arietta in Hamilton County, where it is created by the confluence of smaller streams. It goes on to form part of the boundary between Herkimer, Fulton, and Montgomery counties. It flows through Dolgeville, then enters Kyser Lake.

== Hydrology ==
One stream gauge is located 1.2 miles (1.9 km) upstream from mouth, and 3.5 miles (5.6 km) northwest of the village of St. Johnsville, at the hamlet of East Creek. It has been in service from December 1945 to March 1995, 1998, 2000, 2003-2014, and July 2014 to current year. The station had a maximum discharge of 31,500 cu ft/s (890 m^{3}/s) and a gauge height of 10.99 feet (3.35 m) on June 28, 2006. It had a minimum discharge of 0.05 cu ft/s (0.0014 m^{3}/s) and a gauge height of 0.47 feet (0.14 m) on July 9, 1978. Outside the period of record in the flood of 1945, there was an estimated discharge of 24,000 cu ft/s (680 m^{3}/s) and gauge height of 9 feet (2.7 m).

== See also ==
- West Canada Creek
- List of rivers in New York
