= Dolgeville, New York =

- Village
- Seal

- Location within the state of New York Dolgeville (the United States)
- Coordinates: 43°06′08″N 074°46′20″W
- Country: United States
- State: New York
- Counties: Herkimer, Fulton
- Towns: Manheim, Oppenheim

Area
  - Total: 1.83 sq mi (4.75 km^{2})
  - Land: 1.79 sq mi (4.64 km^{2})
  - Water: 0.042 sq mi (0.11 km^{2})
- Elevation: 791 ft (241 m)

Population (2020)
  - Total: 2,042
  - Density: 1,140.4/sq mi (440.33/km^{2})
- Time zone: UTC-5 (Eastern (EST))
  - Summer (DST): UTC-4 (EDT)
- ZIP code: 13329
- Area code: 315
- FIPS code: 36-20731
- GNIS feature ID: 948550
- Website: villageofdolgeville.gov

Dolgeville is a village in Herkimer and Fulton counties, New York, United States. As of the 2020 census, Dolgeville had a population of 2,042. The village is named after the industrialist Alfred Dolge.

The village is mostly in the eastern part of the town of Manheim (Herkimer County), but is partly in the western edge of the town of Oppenheim (Fulton County). Dolgeville is east of Utica.

== History ==
The village was founded in 1794 by Samuel Low with the construction of two mills. A grist mill and later a saw mill were built by Captain John Favill on Ransom Creek about 1795. Soon a little settlement sprang up as other settlers moved in; with a blacksmith shop, tannery and school house. Families by the names of Ayers, Spencer, Ransom, Spofford, Lamberson, Brockett and Rundell soon followed and settled the adjoining lands which they cleared for farms.

The area was at first called "Green's Bridge" in 1805, as a settler named Green built a bridge over East Canada Creek. In 1826 the area received its first post office, with Zephi Brockett as postmaster, and the area was renamed "Brockett's Bridge" in his honor. In 1881 the citizens unanimously petitioned the authorities at Washington to change the name of the place from "Brockett's Bridge" to "Dolgeville". The village of Dolgeville was incorporated in 1891.

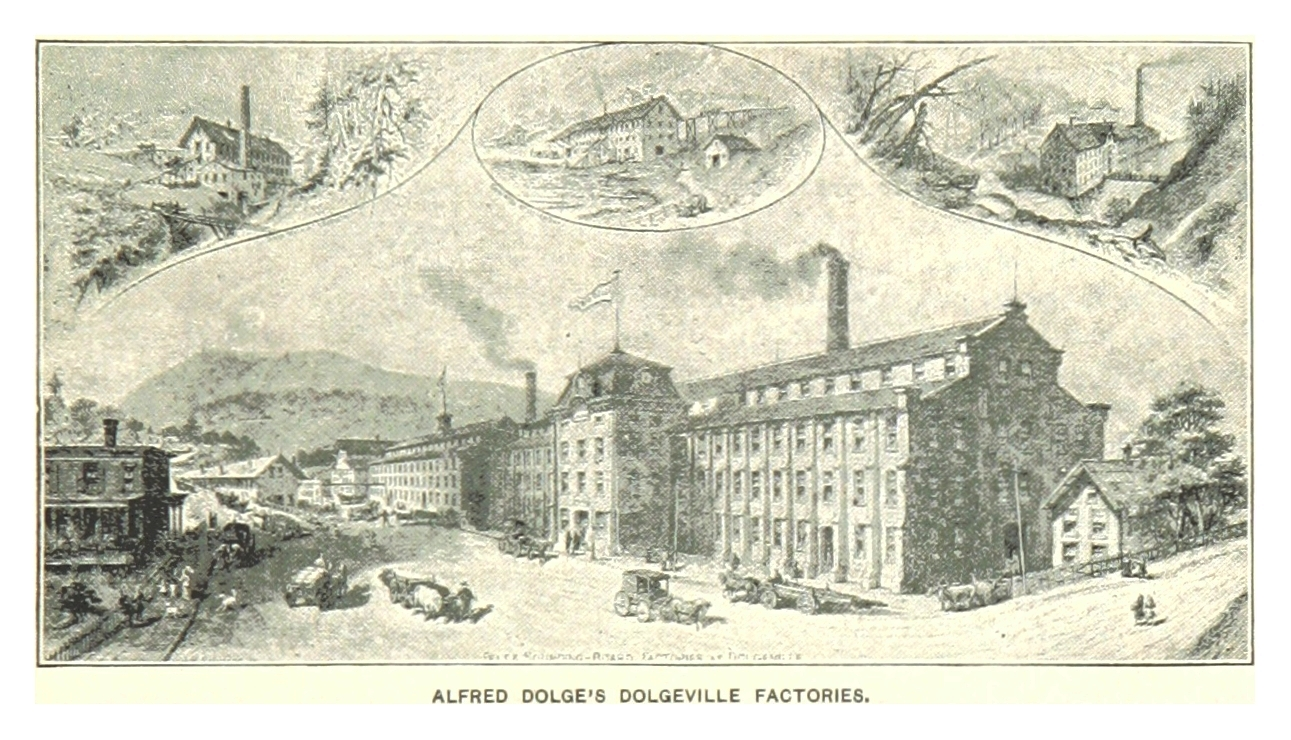
The Dolge Company Factory Complex in 1883

The village changed its name to Dolgeville because of the economic growth promoted by Alfred Dolge (1848–1922), a pioneering and benevolent industrialist. In addition to factories, Dolge built a railroad, laid out the village, built two schools, installed an electric system, a water system, sewage, a fire department, a free library, a concert hall, a gymnasium, public parks, a newspaper, and pioneered in a pension and profit sharing system for employees. Thomas Edison's first water-powered dynamo was installed in Dolge's factory. Dolge's factory largely produced parts and materials for pianos. The Daniel Green shoe company partnered with Dolge after finding that the factory's piano felt was also well-suited for slippers. Dolge's factory and social endeavors failed financially in 1899, and the Dolge Company Factory Complex became property of the Daniel Green company. Daniel Green was the largest employer in the village until 1999, when it shuttered its operations there.

Lyndon Lyon, who lived in Dolgeville until his death in 1999, developed about 800 hybrid varieties of African violet and helped popularize its use as a houseplant. Lyon's greenhouse in Dolgeville still operates and is known for violets and orchids, and Dolgeville's annual Violet Festival commemorates him.

In 1965, a caver named James G. Mitchell became trapped under a waterfall while exploring a cave near Dolgeville. Despite a team of cave rescuers arriving on Air Force 2, Mitchell died. Mitchell's entrapment and death became a national news story and raised awareness among cavers of the risk of hypothermia. Part of the cave collapsed during the initial attempt to retrieve Mitchell's body, and the attempt was abandoned. At the time, the cave mouth was dynamited shut to prevent future mishaps. Mitchell's corpse was finally retrieved in 2006 and returned to his family.

In late 2014, Alfred Dolge's 1895 mansion, which stood behind the historic factory complex, was destroyed by fire. The cause of the fire has yet to be determined.

The Breckwoldt-Ward House, Menge House Complex, Alfred Dolge Hose Co. No. 1 Building, Dolge Company Factory Complex, and United States Post Office are listed on the National Register of Historic Places. The Beaversprite nature preserve is partially in the Fulton County portion of Dolgeville.

== Geography ==
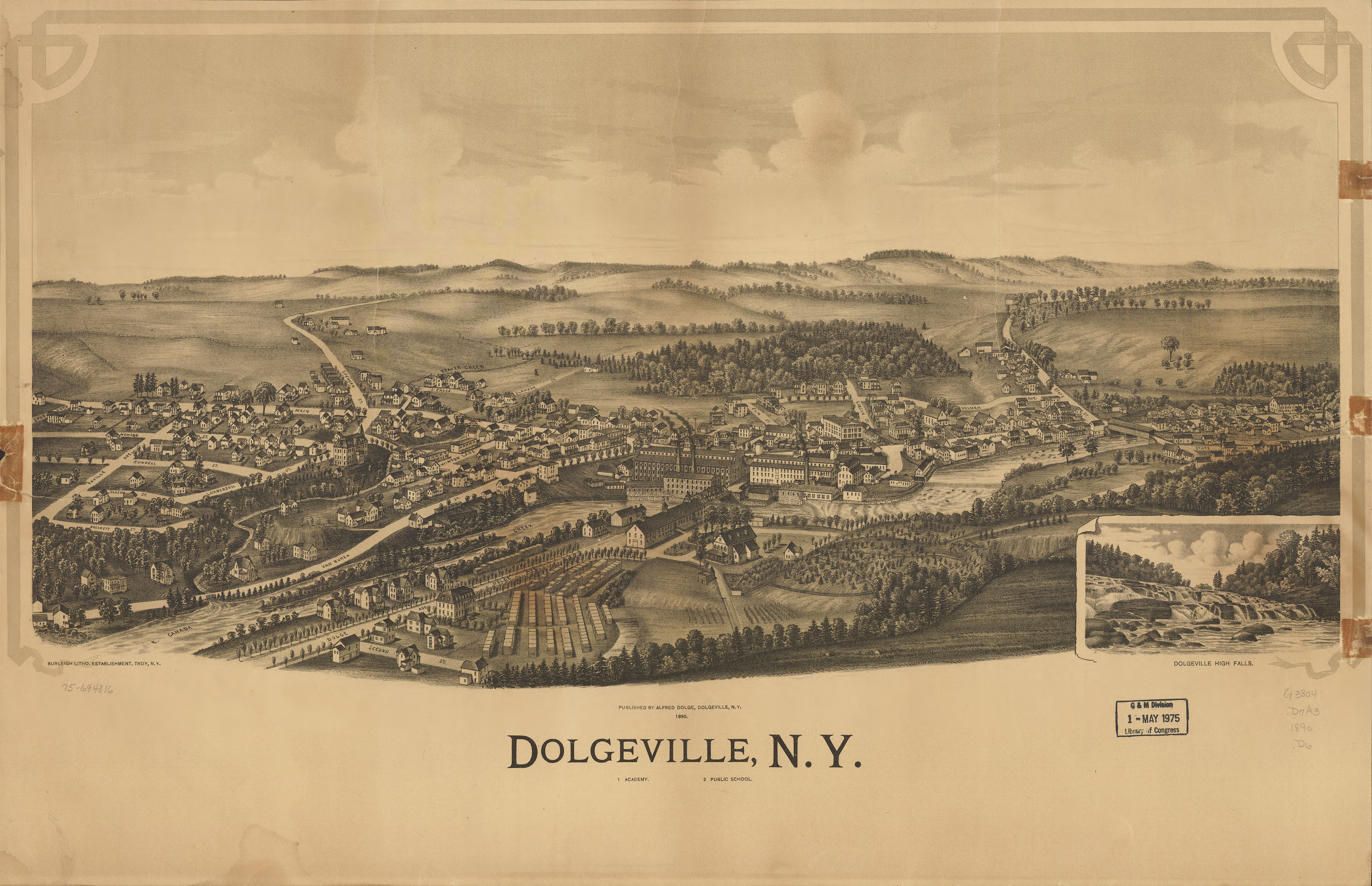
Perspective map of Dolgeville in 1890

Dolgeville is located in east-central Herkimer County and western Fulton County at 43°06′08″N 74°46′20″W (43.102233, -74.772294). According to the United States Census Bureau, the village has a total area of 1.83 square miles (4.75 km^{2}), of which 1.79 square miles (4.64 km^{2}) is land and 0.04 square miles (0.11 km^{2}), or 2.38%, is water.

The main part of the village is in the northeastern corner of the town of Manheim, on the west side of East Canada Creek, a southward-flowing tributary of the Mohawk River. The section of the village on the east side of the creek is in the town of Oppenheim. The northern end of the village near the East Canada suffers from periodic flooding, with major floods in 2006, 2019, and 2022.

New York State Route 29 (North Helmer Avenue/State Street) and New York State Route 167 (Main Street) intersect in Dolgeville, with NY 167 having its northern terminus at the intersection. Route 29 leads east 24 miles (39 km) to Johnstown, the Fulton County seat, and west 12 miles (19 km) to Middleville, while Route 167 leads southwest 8 miles (13 km) to Little Falls on the Mohawk River.

== Demographics ==
Historical population
Census	Pop.	Note	%±
1900	1,915		—
1910	2,685		40.2%
1920	3,448		28.4%
1930	3,309		−4.0%
1940	3,195		−3.4%
1950	3,204		0.3%
1960	3,058		−4.6%
1970	2,872		−6.1%
1980	2,602		−9.4%
1990	2,452		−5.8%
2000	2,166		−11.7%
2010	2,206		1.8%
2020	2,042		−7.4%
U.S. Decennial Census

=== 2020 census ===
As of the 2020 census, Dolgeville had a population of 2,042. The median age was 42.5 years. 22.6% of residents were under the age of 18 and 22.9% of residents were 65 years of age or older. For every 100 females, there were 92.5 males, and for every 100 females age 18 and over, there were 88.2 males age 18 and over.

0.0% of residents lived in urban areas, while 100.0% lived in rural areas.

There were 888 households in Dolgeville, of which 29.1% had children under the age of 18 living in them. Of all households, 38.9% were married-couple households, 18.4% were households with a male householder and no spouse or partner present, and 32.4% were households with a female householder and no spouse or partner present. About 33.9% of all households were made up of individuals, and 18.9% had someone living alone who was 65 years of age or older.

There were 1,056 housing units, of which 15.9% were vacant. The homeowner vacancy rate was 3.1% and the rental vacancy rate was 9.4%.

Racial composition as of the 2020 census
Race	Number	Percent
White	1,886	92.4%
Black or African American	4	0.2%
American Indian and Alaska Native	2	0.1%
Asian	11	0.5%
Native Hawaiian and Other Pacific Islander	0	0.0%
Some other race	20	1.0%
Two or more races	119	5.8%
Hispanic or Latino (of any race)	43	2.1%

=== 2000 census ===
As of the census of 2000, there were 2,166 people, 915 households, and 592 families residing in the village. The population density was 1,182.4 inhabitants per square mile (456.5/km^{2}). There were 1,018 housing units at an average density of 555.7 per square mile (214.6/km^{2}). The racial makeup of the village was 97.41% White, 0.23% African American, 0.69% Native American, 0.42% Asian, 0.05% Pacific Islander, 0.09% from other races, and 1.11% from two or more races. Hispanic or Latino of any race were 0.97% of the population.

There were 915 households, out of which 29.8% had children under the age of 18 living with them, 46.7% were married couples living together, 12.8% had a female householder with no husband present, and 35.2% were non-families. 31.5% of all households were made up of individuals, and 17.6% had someone living alone who was 65 years of age or older. The average household size was 2.35 and the average family size was 2.91.

In the village, the population was spread out, with 24.3% under the age of 18, 7.8% from 18 to 24, 23.9% from 25 to 44, 25.8% from 45 to 64, and 18.3% who were 65 years of age or older. The median age was 41 years. For every 100 females, there were 87.4 males. For every 100 females age 18 and over, there were 85.1 males.

The median income for a household in the village was $30,863, and the median income for a family was $38,646. Males had a median income of $29,667 versus $17,500 for females. The per capita income for the village was $14,787. About 7.4% of families and 10.9% of the population were below the poverty line, including 12.3% of those under age 18 and 10.9% of those age 65 or over.

== Economy ==
The Dolge factory complex remains vacant, notwithstanding some failed revitalization attempts, but other factories operate in the village. A Rawlings plant in Dolgeville makes a large percentage of the baseball bats used by Major League Baseball under the brand "Adirondack", as well as other wood products. North Hudson Woodcraft Corp., which had manufactured piano parts for Steinway since the 1800s until about 2005, now manufactures other wood products such as kitchen cabinets and caskets. Other companies include Gehring-Tricot, which manufactures textile products, and Tumbleforms and Bergeron By Design, which manufacture physical therapy products.

== Education ==
The Dolgeville Central School District covers the village. The high school was built in 1954, and an attached elementary school was built in the 1980s after the Stratford school district was annexed.

== Media ==
Most of the village is served by television stations in the Utica media market as well as the Observer-Dispatch, also in Utica. The small portion in Fulton County is served by stations in the Albany market and The Leader Herald in Gloversville. The Times Telegram in nearby Herkimer also serves the entire village.

== Notable people ==
- Alfred Dolge (1848–1922), industrialist and village namesake
- Rudolf Ruedemann (1864–1956), German-American paleontologist
- Henry I. Patrie (1874–1935), businessman and politician
- Hal Schumacher (1910–1993), baseball player
- Harold C. Luther (1915–1973), politician
- John Neulinger (1924–1991), psychologist
- Peter Fehlner (1931–2018), Roman Catholic priest, writer, and theologian, was born in Dolgeville.

== Organizations based in Dolgeville ==
- North American Vegetarian Society has been headquartered in Dolgeville since it was founded in 1974.
