= Yatika Starr Fields =

American painter (born 1980)

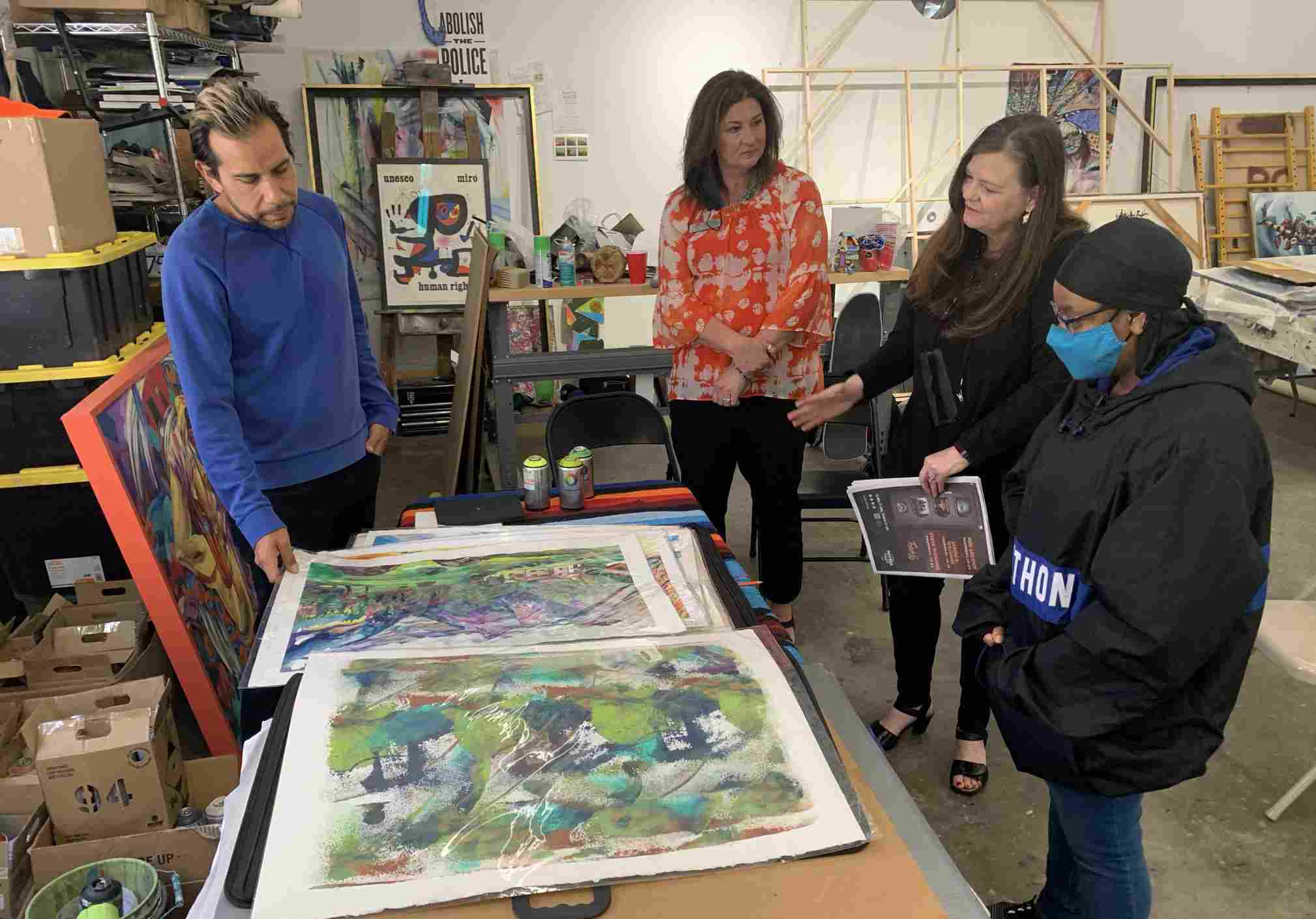
- Yatika Starr Fields in his Tulsa Studio to discuss the mural Fields will paint at the NOC Tonkawa campus. From left Yatika Starr Fields, Sheri Snyder, NOC Vice President for Development and Community Relations, Cheryl Evans, NOC President, and NOC student representative Morshayla Dumas.
- Born: Tulsa, Oklahoma
- Citizenship: American
- Occupations: Artist, Muralist, Painter

Yatika Starr Fields (born 1980) is a Native American painter, muralist and street artist, born in the city of Tulsa, Oklahoma. His artworks were shown at numerous galleries and museums, including the APEC Young Artist Exhibition and recently in the Sam Noble Museum.

Fields' artworks explores the themes of family, community, and cultural diversity to illustrate its significance in societal norms for Native Americans.

== Biography ==
Yatika Fields grew up in an artistic family and followed in the footsteps of his parents, Tom and Anita Fields, who are both Native artists themselves. Yatika Fields is part of the Cherokee, Creek and Osage tribes. He is also a Bear clan member. In the Creek and Osage tribes, he is named Yvtekv (meaning "interpreter"), and has some multivalent projects that are open to the audience. The name Ho-moie was also given to him from the members of the Osage tribes. Fields' techniques involve using oil, acrylic, and watercolour mediums on canvases and paper to create his works of art. He utilizes bright, vibrant colours which are visible in his large illustrations. His mural pieces are expressed inside galleries and outside on the streets, which is where he continues to produce his graffiti art.

== Life and education ==
Yatika Starr Fields attended Stillwater High School where he found his passion for painting. In high school, he was given many opportunities where he learned a variety of different techniques.

Fields has been able to travel the world and engage with diverse cultural communities. “I got to meet all of these artists who were quite young, but older than me. They were already making good work,” remembers Fields. “I saw on a global scale what artists were doing and the dialogue they were having, and that shifted my perception of what I wanted to do.”

In 2000, Yatika attended a college-level summer painting course in Italy, which was organized by an art professor from Oklahoma State University (OSU). In November, he presented himself at the APEC Economic Leaders’ Meeting where he was chosen to represent young Native American artists. In this regard, he studied how to paint with materials, such as light and colour.

=== Graffiti art ===
In his graffiti pieces, Fields uses distinctive approaches (lines, movement, layering), which differentiates him from other painters. He then graduated from high school and attended The Art Institute of Boston from 2001 to 2004. During these years, he continued to paint, and he began to work on large murals. This was where he developed his interest in graffiti art. "Graffiti is very confrontational. This was me rebelling against the Western idea of fine art. It was me finding another new voice and new style and rejecting everything I had just learned (in college)," says Fields adding that his graffiti work added to his ability to work large-scale and use full body motion are skills that he continues to utilize when creating large murals in front of an audience: "It's almost choreographed, like you're putting on a performance."

=== Indigenous culture ===
The use of strong and vibrant colours in his pieces portray the diverse groups of Indigenous people. Through Yatika's artworks, he encourages individuals to have an enhanced understanding on indigenous culture because of the way they are misrepresented in society. He paints his large murals in Indigenous areas and in places that aren't as wealthy. He creates his art in these communities because he wants to brighten these sites with bold colours in order to show the beauty of that specific place.

Fields has emphasized the importance of mentorship and community engagement within the Native American art world. He has noted that, while he spent his twenties being mentored by older artists, his later career has shifted toward supporting younger artists, citing his philosophy of "giving back" to a community. Fields specifically advocates for artists who challenge traditional perceptions of Native American art and maintain active ties to their communities.

=== Standing Rock protests ===
Fields was at Standing Rock in 2016 when he joined the Standing Rock Sioux Tribe and their supporters at the Dakota Access Pipeline, a major event in his life as an activist. Fields says being a part of the protests significantly shifted the content of his artwork and how he perceives his responsibility not only as an artist. “My dad was at Alcatraz and we had family friends at Wounded Knee, so I’ve always known about Native American occupations and the politics of the United States,” said Fields. “There was an opportunity to go, not just as a spectator, but to be a believer for who we are as a people and to fight for our rights just like my ancestors did. It was very powerful.”

=== War Club ===
Fields is working with his mother (Fiber Artist Anita Fields) to create a community engagement project titled “War Club" which will focus on Oklahoma Indigenous activism from the late 1960s to present day. “As a Native, we are political just by being alive and existing,” says Fields. “I’m an artist, I’m an image maker and thinker. I want my work to be with dialogue to make you think about things. Maybe we can find a solution through these works. I’m not for sure, but it’s worth trying, and we have to do it together.”

== Artworks ==
=== White Buffalo Calf Woman ===
In 2017, Yatika Starr Fields took part in a protest against the Dakota Access Pipeline (#NODAPL), which involved an oil pipeline running through rivers near the Standing Rock reservation. The Standing Rock tribe saw this as an issue because it could have harmed their indigenous land containing ancestral burial grounds. He showed his involvement in the protest through his art. This oil on canvas artwork is divided into three sections that illustrate different elements. The sunrise and sunset are painted on the top and lower half of the painting to indicate the time the ceremony took place. In the centre, there are three women marching on the street, wearing a long skirt or dress with winter boots. The shawl that is worn over the women's clothes is a symbol for the White Buffalo Calf Woman. Yatika Fields painted this piece to show his support for the women protesting and standing up for the Standing Rock tribes.

=== Sami Solidarity ===
An oil on canvas painted by Yatika Fields in 2017 portrays the hardships of protecting Indigenous land. There are many vibrant colours that was used in this piece. In 2016, Norwegian, Swedish and Finnish indigenous people and two Sami women were leaving the Oceti Sakowin. This was a camp resisting the Dakota Access Pipeline where indigenous people would stand up for their rights against government oppression. The two indigenous individuals in the painting are wearing gákti which is a traditional item of clothing. The gákti is worn during ceremonies that are "characterized by bands of contrasting colors, a high collar embroidery and tin art" Yatika Fields captured this moment to illustrate the realities of indigenous people.

=== Prayer for the Return of Bees ===
This is an oil on canvas, painted in 2008. Through this piece, Yatika Fields tried to imagine a world where bees were extinct. Thus, he wanted to show the global issue of the decline in bee population. He added elements of nature while using bright and bold colours.

=== Mural in Cultural Engagement Center at Northern Oklahoma College ===
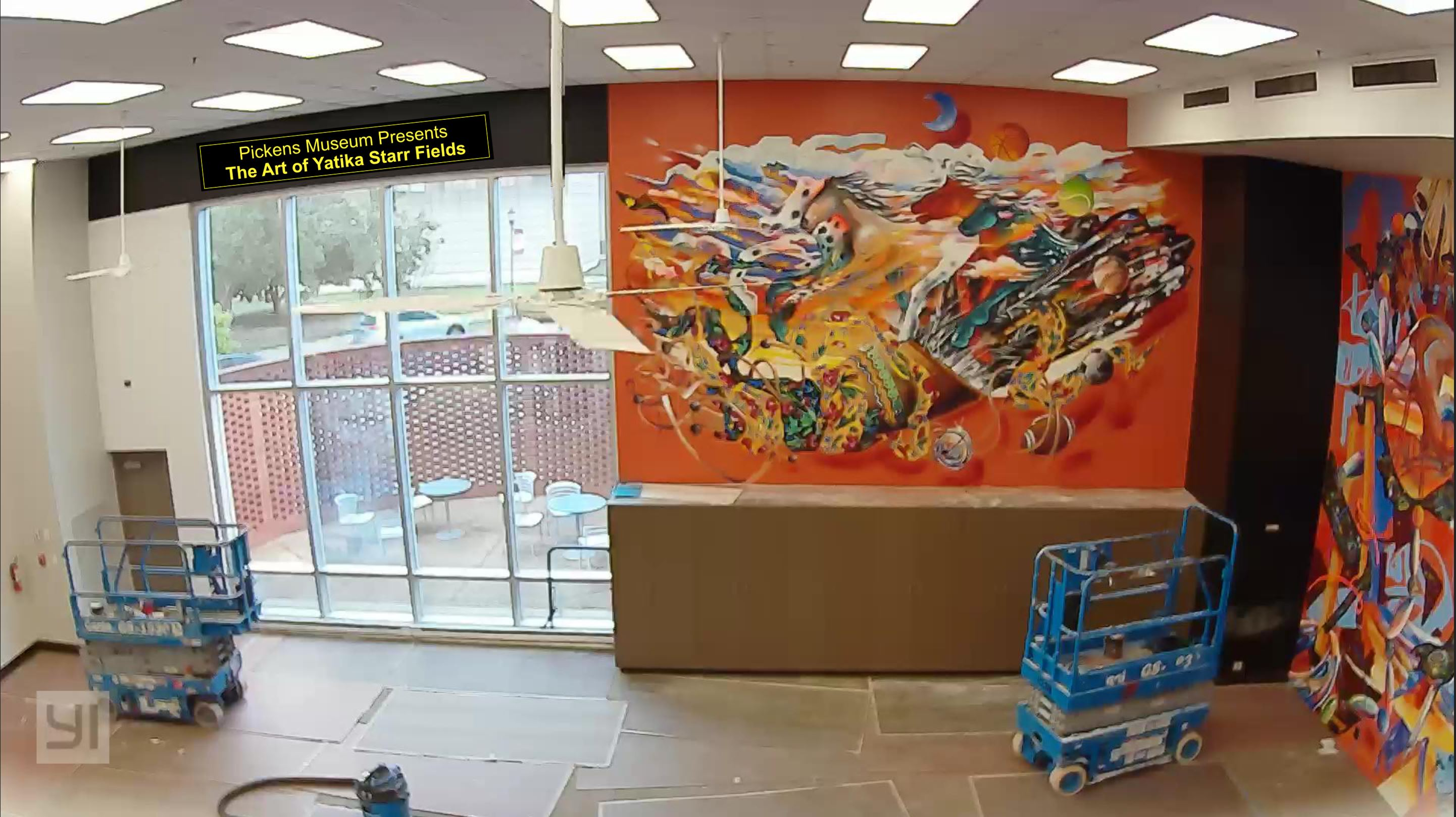
Pickens Museum commissioned a mural by Osage Artist Yatika Starr Fields in the Cultural Engagement Center at Northern Oklahoma College in Tonkawa in 2020.

In 2021 Pickens Museum commissioned a 20 foot by 60 foot mural by Osage Artist Yatika Starr Fields in the Cultural Engagement Center at Northern Oklahoma College. The CEC opened in 2017 with learning spaces where students, faculty, and tribal leaders can meet, study, teach, and hold events. Fields emulates movement and rhythm in her mural depicting drums, beads, dancers, and horses to in an attempt to stress the cultural importance of dancing to Native communities.

“When (NOC President) Cheryl Evans said they were looking for an artist to paint a mural for the engagement center, I immediately recommended Yatika,” says Hugh Pickens, executive director of Pickens Museum adding that Pickens Museum already has ten paintings by Fields in its permanent collection. “Yatika was delighted to have the opportunity to paint a mural that will inspire Native American students at NOC.”

=== Mural in Pickens Museum at Northern Oklahoma College in Tonkawa ===
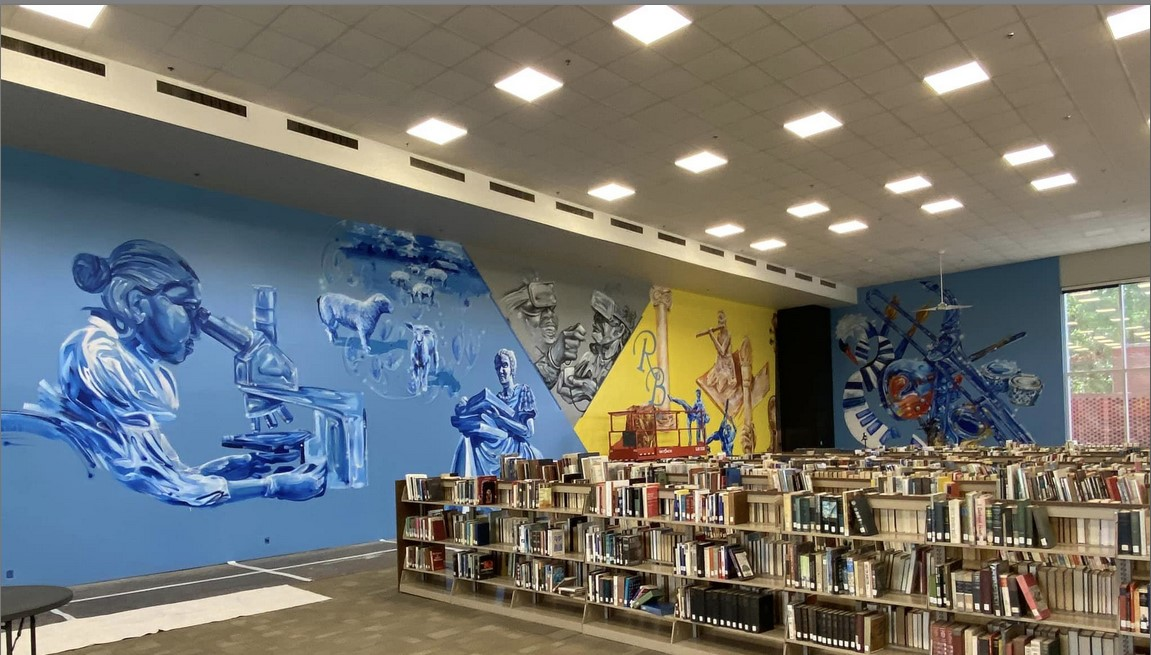
Mural by Yatika Starr Fields in Pickens Learning Commons at Northern Oklahoma College in Tonkawa.

In February 2021 Northern Oklahoma College signed an agreement to display art works from Pickens Museum on their Tonkawa campus. “This is an exciting opportunity for us to share our art and culture with the Northern Oklahoma College community," said Hugh Pickens, executive director of Pickens Museum. Phase One of the project included the display of “Fool’s Crow” by native artist C. J. Wells in the library entrance of the Vineyard Library Administration Building and "Apache Warrior" by Malvina Hoffman. “This collection of art will add to the cultural enhancement of the Library and Cultural Engagement Center on the NOC Tonkawa campus. We are grateful for friends such as the Pickens who have chosen to share their gifts with us," said NOC President Cheryl Evans.

In August, 2022, Northern Oklahoma College announced the transformation of Vineyard Library into a contemporary Student Learning Commons named the Pickens Learning Commons, that includes two new permanent murals totaling 100’x20’ by artist Yatika Starr Fields, along with eighty art works from the Doctor Pickens Museum to be on long-term display. Fields already created two existing murals in the Cultural Engagement Center, commissioned by the Doctor Pickens Museum in November 2020 and completed in June 2021.

Yatika Starr Fields' 100' x 20' mural in the Pickens Learning Commons includes several different scenes from Northern Oklahoma College including a woman looking through a microscope, show lambs, another woman looking through a stack of books, men in space looking through VR systems, NOC's mascot, Mav the bull, the Roustabouts, and the different performing arts. "These all flow in a beautiful display of colors and an incredible show of knowledge."

== Ultra-running and painting ==
Fields runs Ultramarathons several times each year and in August, 2019 completed the Ultra-Trail du Mont-Blanc (UTMB) TDS, a 145-kilometer (90-mile) trail race in the Alps with 9,100-meters of elevation change. Fields says there is a connection between his running and his painting.

I’m still figuring it out, but I think it’s the same thing: It’s about being patient with results. It’s about being consistent to the devotion of the art—running is an art form; painting is an art form; your body is an art form; movement is an art form. These are all things that are both shared between the brush and the legs and the mind. Running is colorful; painting is colorful. Running is poetry; painting is poetry. I’ve found a really eloquent correlation between the two that’s kind of hard to describe almost, but it’s about movement.

== Personal ==
At the moment, Fields lives in Brooklyn, New York City. He still paints, and he is inspired by the energetic and lively city which fuels his creativity.

== Exhibitions ==
Yatika Starr Fields has his artworks exhibited in these exhibitions. His resume lists the following:

- National Scholastic Art Exhibit, Corcoran Gallery of Art, Washington DC (1999)
- Contemporary Indigenous Arts: Discovering the Roots (APEC) Young Artist Exhibition, Malaysia (2000)
- Contemporary Indian Market Show, Santa Fe (2007)
- Dynamic Interpretations, Southern Plains Museum, Oklahoma (2008)
- In-Visibility, Amerinda, New York City (2009)
- Inside-Outside, Lovetts Gallery, Oklahoma (2010)
- Exhibit of the Salon du Dessin et de la Peinture à l’Eau, Grand Palais, Paris, France (2011)
- Indigenous Water Rights, MainSite Gallery, Oklahoma (2012)
- Unraveling Time, Alexandria Museum of Art, Alexandria, LA (2013)
- Affiliated: The Art of the Urban Experience, Brisky Gallery, Florida (2013)
- Contemporary Native Group Show, Chiaroscuro Contemporary Art, Santa Fe (2013)
- Annual Contemporary Native American Group Show, Chiaroscuro Contemporary Art, Santa Fe (2014)
- Santa Fe Indian Market Group Show, BlueRain Gallery, Santa Fe (2015)
- Cultural Crossroads Group Exhibition, Joseph Gierek Fine Art, Tulsa Oklahoma (2017)
- Solo Exhibition, Rainmaker Gallery, Bristol UK (2017)
- Fluent Generations: The Art of Anita, Tom, and Yatika Fields, Oklahoma (2018)
- Decadence, Solo Exhibition, TAC Gallery, Oklahoma (2018)
- Art For A New Understanding, IAIA, Santa Fe (2019)
- Monarchs, Bluestar Contemporary, San Antonio (2019)
- Artist in Residence, Crow's Shadow Institute of the Arts (2019)

== Honors and awards ==
In 2000, Yatika Starr Fields received the American Vision Award after he graduated from Stillwater High School. He took part in the Unexpected and the Fort Smith Symphony collaboration. Yatika Fields and students from the University of Arkansas-Fort Smith (UAFS) painted what they envisioned when they heard an orchestral piece being played.

== Collections ==
Fields is represented by the Garth Greenen Gallery (NYC), Rain Maker Gallery (Bristol, UK) and Joseph Gierek Fine Art (Tulsa, OK). His work can be seen in:

- Oklahoma State Museum
- Sam Noble Museum
- Heard Museum
- Gilcrease Museum
- Hood Museum Dartmouth
- Volkenkunde Museum

=== Pickens Museum ===
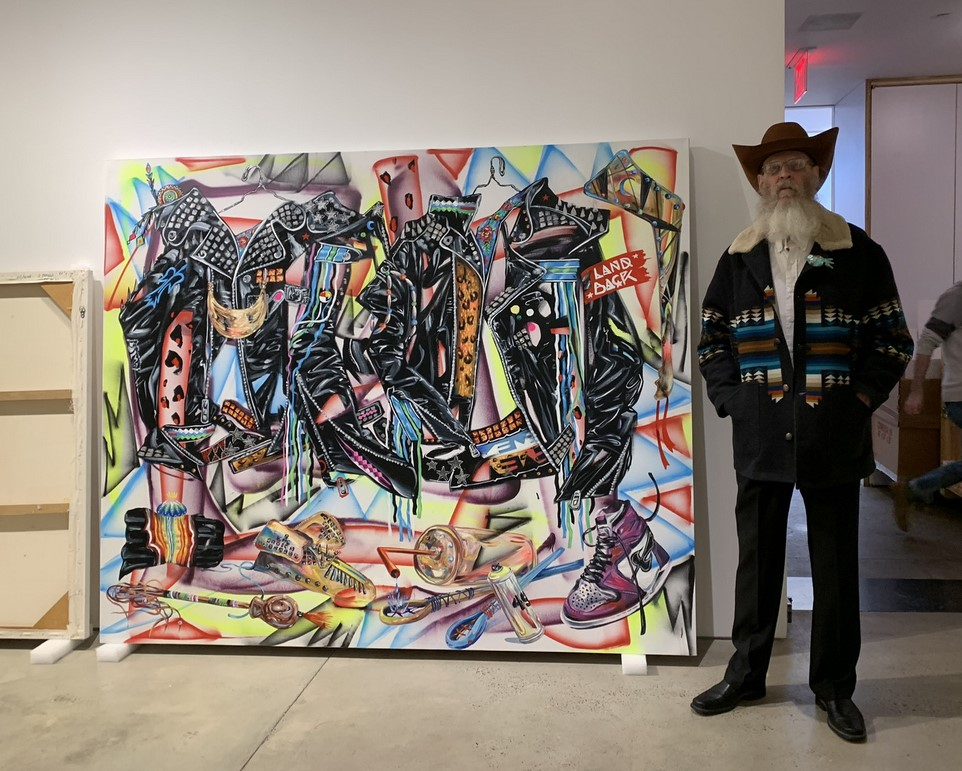
"War Club" by Yatika Starr Fields was acquired by Pickens Museum in 2022 joining another dozen paintings by Fields in its collection.

Pickens Museum has an extensive collection of over a dozen of Fields' paintings. Pickens Museum commissioned a 20' by 60' mural for the Cultural Engagement Center at Northern Oklahoma College (NOC) in Tonkawa in 2021 and also commissioned a 20' by 100' mural for Pickens Learning Commons at NOC in 2022.
