= Balloon Farm =

Balloon Farm may refer to:

- Balloon Farm (Frankfort, New York), a historic home at Frankfort in Herkimer County, New York
- Balloon Farm (film), a 1999 TV movie
- The Balloon Farm, a musical act from New Jersey
