= Pickens Museum =

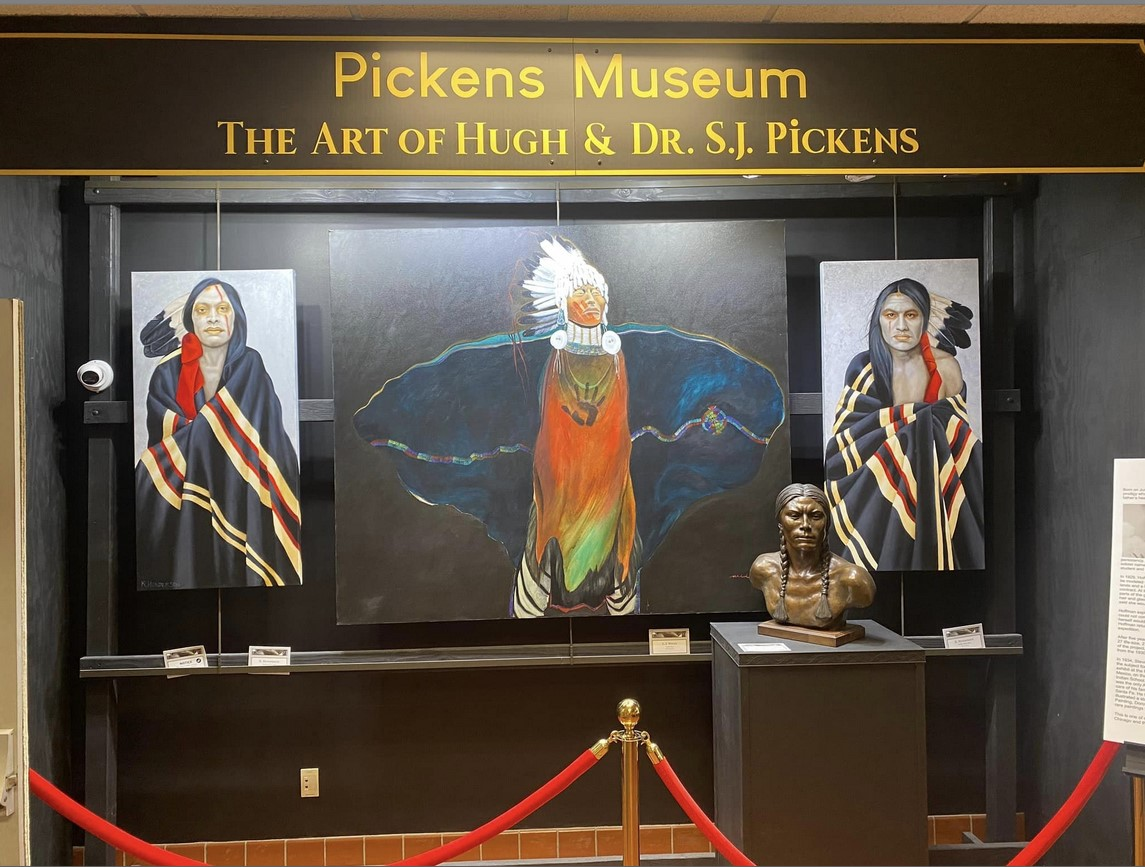
- Entrance to Pickens Museum at Northern Oklahoma College in Tonkawa
- Established: 2018
- Location: Ponca City, Oklahoma; Tonkawa, Oklahoma; Woolaroc
- Coordinates: 36.6783°N 97.2968°W
- Type: Art Museum
- Founder: Hugh Pickens
- Owner: Independent non-profit (503c)
- Website: PickensMuseum.com

Pickens Museum is a fine arts museum with exhibition spaces at three locations in North Central Oklahoma: Pickens Learning Commons in the Vineyard Building at Northern Oklahoma College in Tonkawa, Oklahoma; Pickens Museum at City Central in Ponca City, Oklahoma, and Pickens Art Gallery at Woolaroc Museum in the Osage Hills of Northeastern Oklahoma between Barnsdall and Bartlesville

Pickens Museum displays Native American jewelry, African American Art, Native American art, art by Oklahoma artists, bronze sculptures and verdite sculptures from Zimbabwe.

== Collection ==
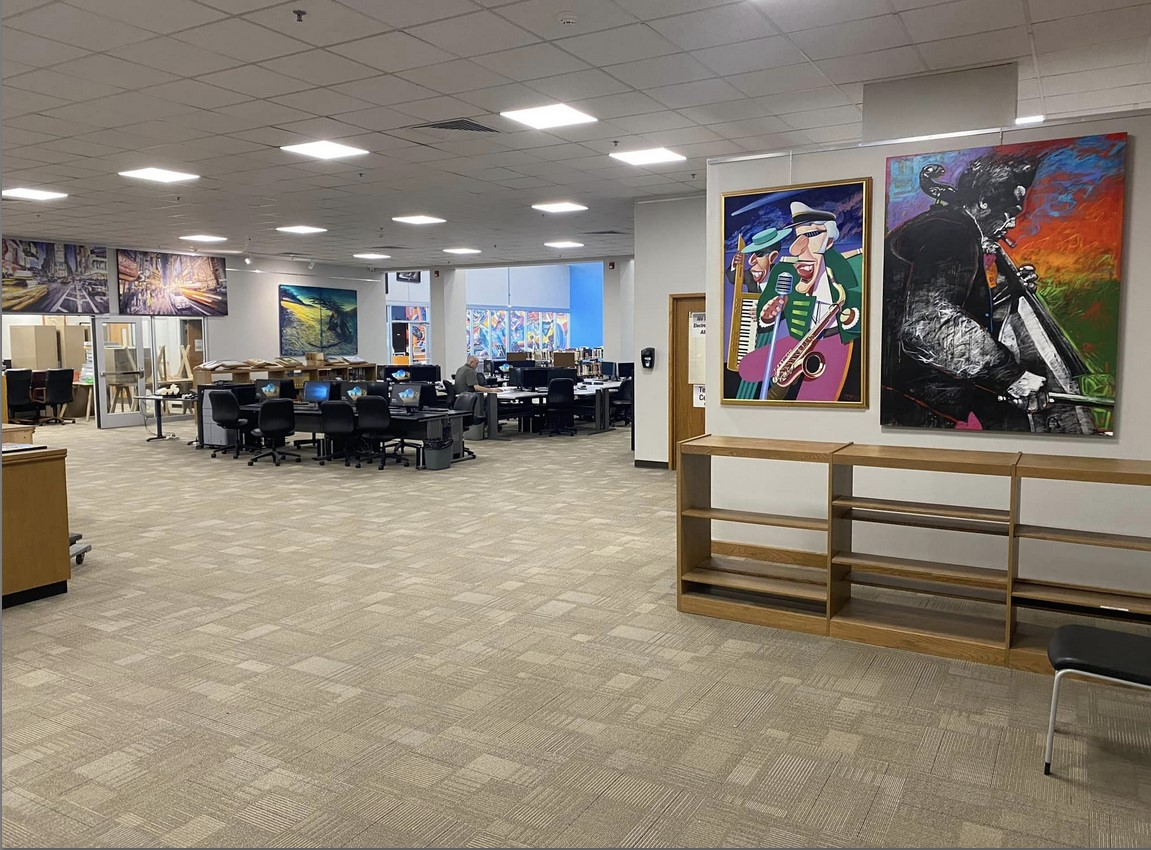
Pickens Learning Commons at Northern Oklahoma College in Tonkawa.

Pickens Museum's collection includes Native American turquoise jewelry and art by Jolene Bird, Bryon Yellowhorse, as well as art by Allan Houser, Josué Sánchez, Yatika Starr Fields, among others. Also represented in the collection are works by African American artists Malvin Gray Johnson, Faith Ringgold, Varnette Honeywood, Barbara Chase-Riboud, among others. The collection also includes Oklahoma art by Eugene Bavinger, and bronze sculptures by Donald De Lue, Paul Manship, Malvina Hoffman, Jo Davidson, Hermon Atkins MacNeil, Charles Cordier, Bryant Baker, and Albert Wein; and Verdite Sculptures from Zimbabwe.

== Pickens Learning Commons at Northern Oklahoma College ==
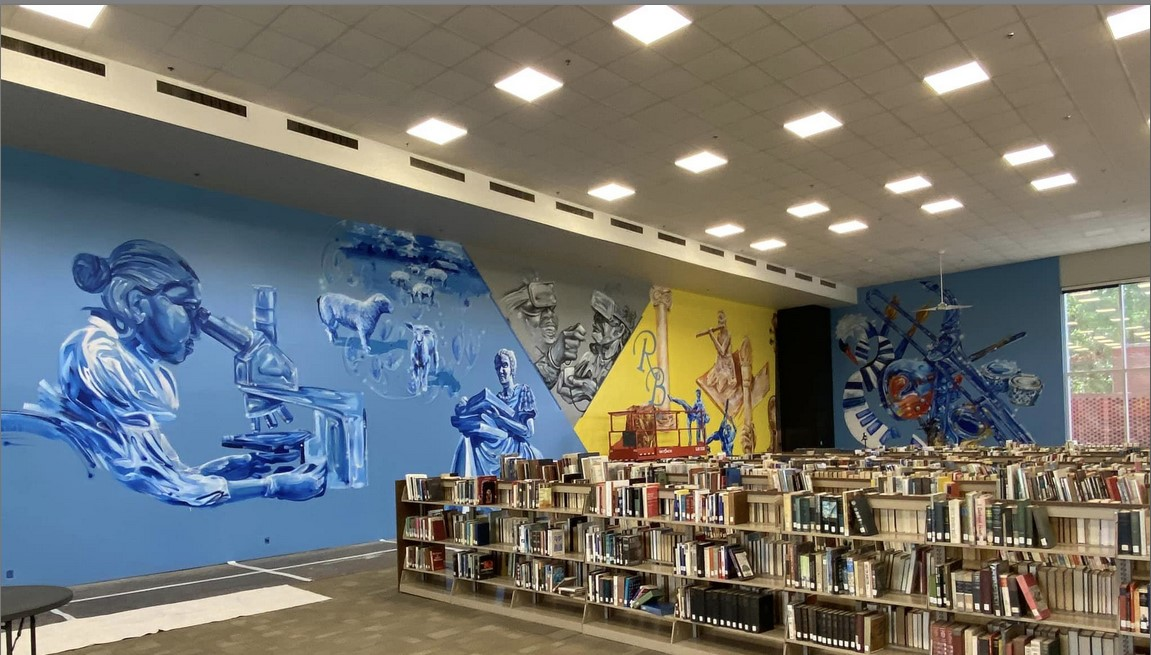
Mural by Yatika Starr Fields in Pickens Learning Commons at Northern Oklahoma College in Tonkawa.

In February 2021 Northern Oklahoma College signed an agreement to display art works from the museum on their Tonkawa campus. Phase One of the project included the display of “Fool’s Crow” by native artist C. J. Wells in the library entrance of the Vineyard Library Administration Building and "Apache Warrior" by Malvina Hoffman.

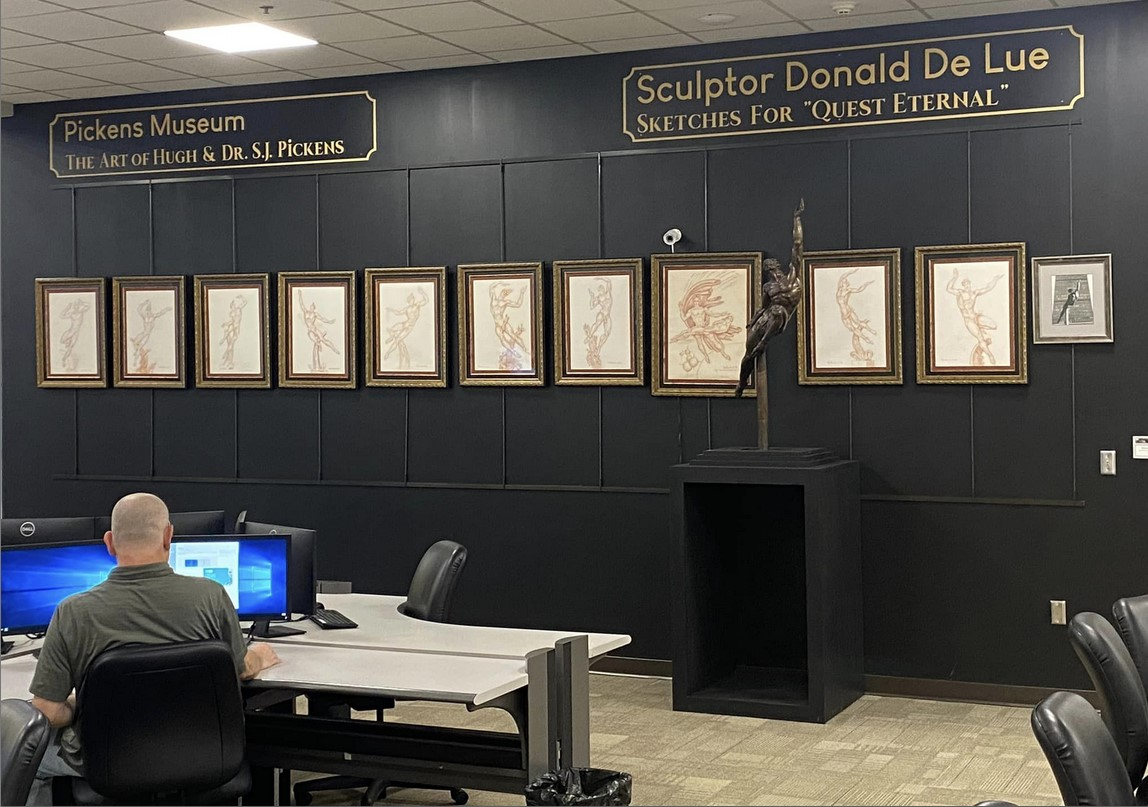
Donald De Lue Exhibit at Pickens Learning Commons at Northern Oklahoma College in Tonkawa.

In March 2021 the museum exhibited "Quest Eternal" by American sculptor Donald De Lue as well as over forty of De Lue’s sculptures, over 100 of his original sketches, and 135 of De Lue’s original sketch books.

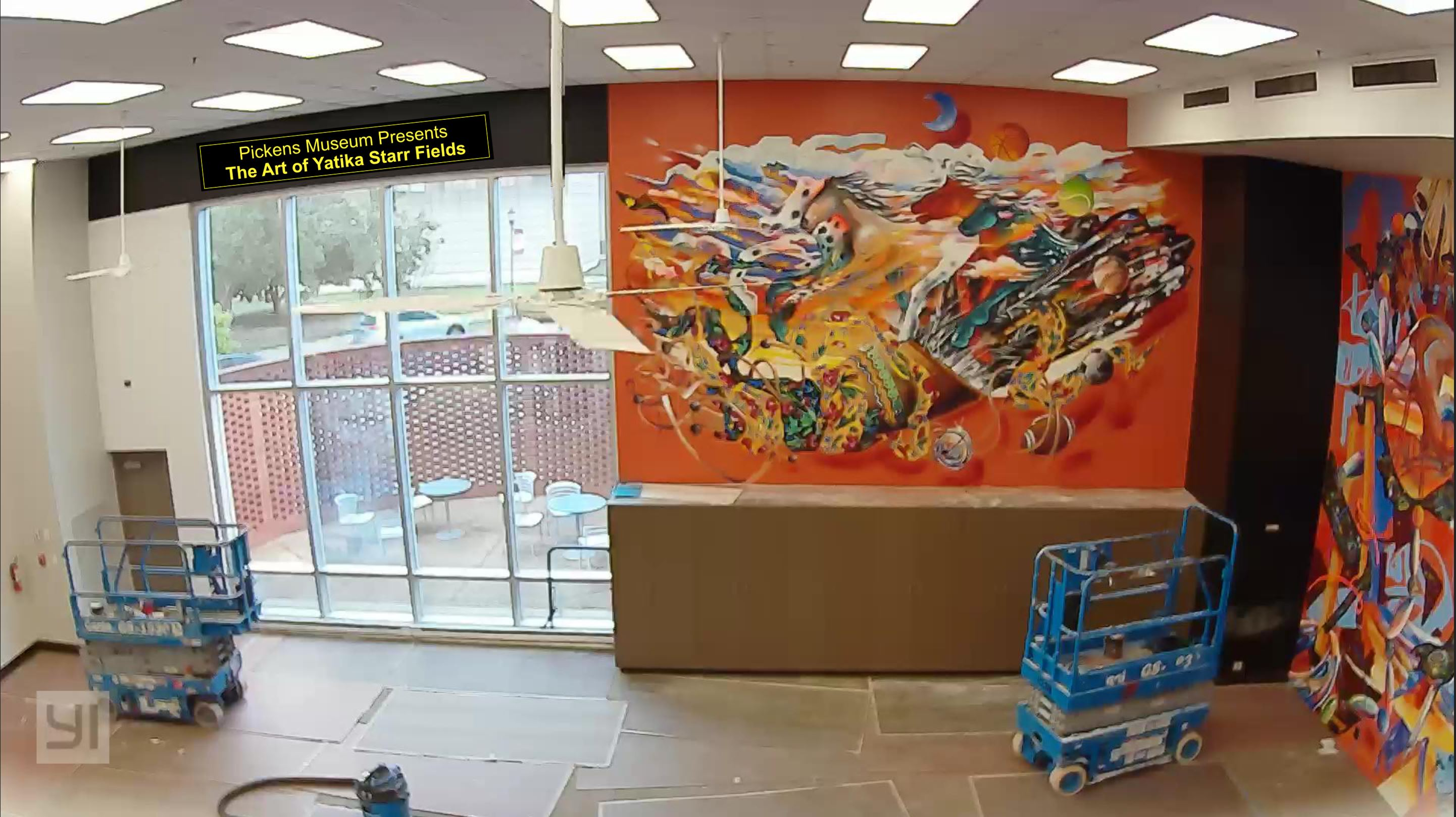
mural by Osage Artist Yatika Starr Fields

Also in 2021 Osage Artist Yatika Starr Fields was commissioned to produce a 20' x 60' mural in the Cultural Engagement Center at Northern Oklahoma College. Fields’ mural refers to movement, rhythm and Native American dance. Additionally Fields has ten paintings by Fields in the permanent collection.

In August, 2022, Northern Oklahoma College announced the transformation a library into the Pickens Learning Commons for students, that includes two permanent murals totaling 100’x20’ by artist Yatika Starr Fields, along with eighty art works from the museum to be on long-term display.

In September 2022, Northern Oklahoma College inaugurated a virtual museum at Pickens Learning Commons which shows seven web cams throughout the commons with views of the art on display in the museum.

== City Central in Ponca City location ==
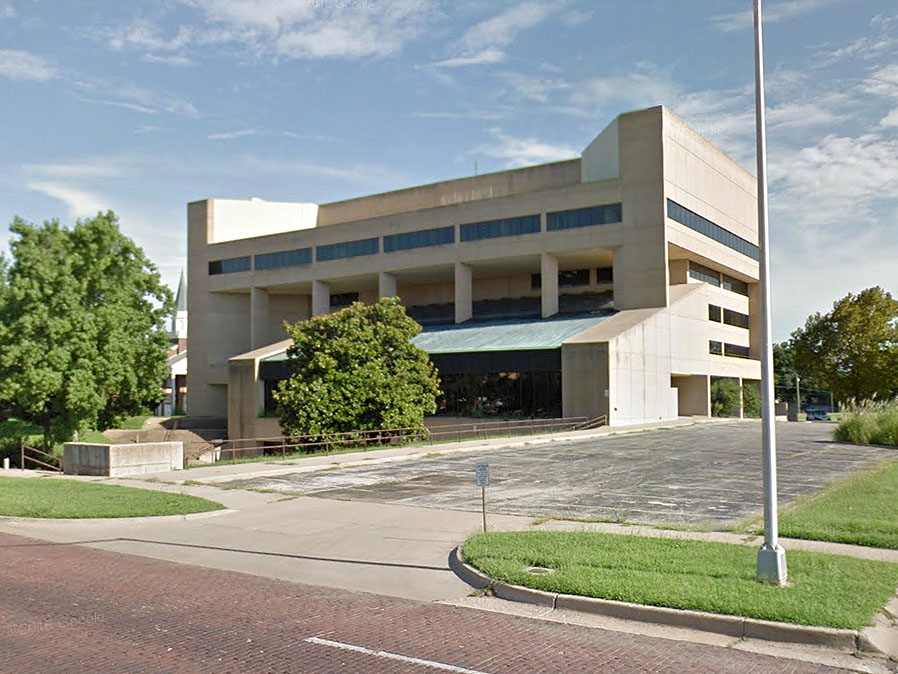
Pickens Museum is located at City Central in Ponca City.

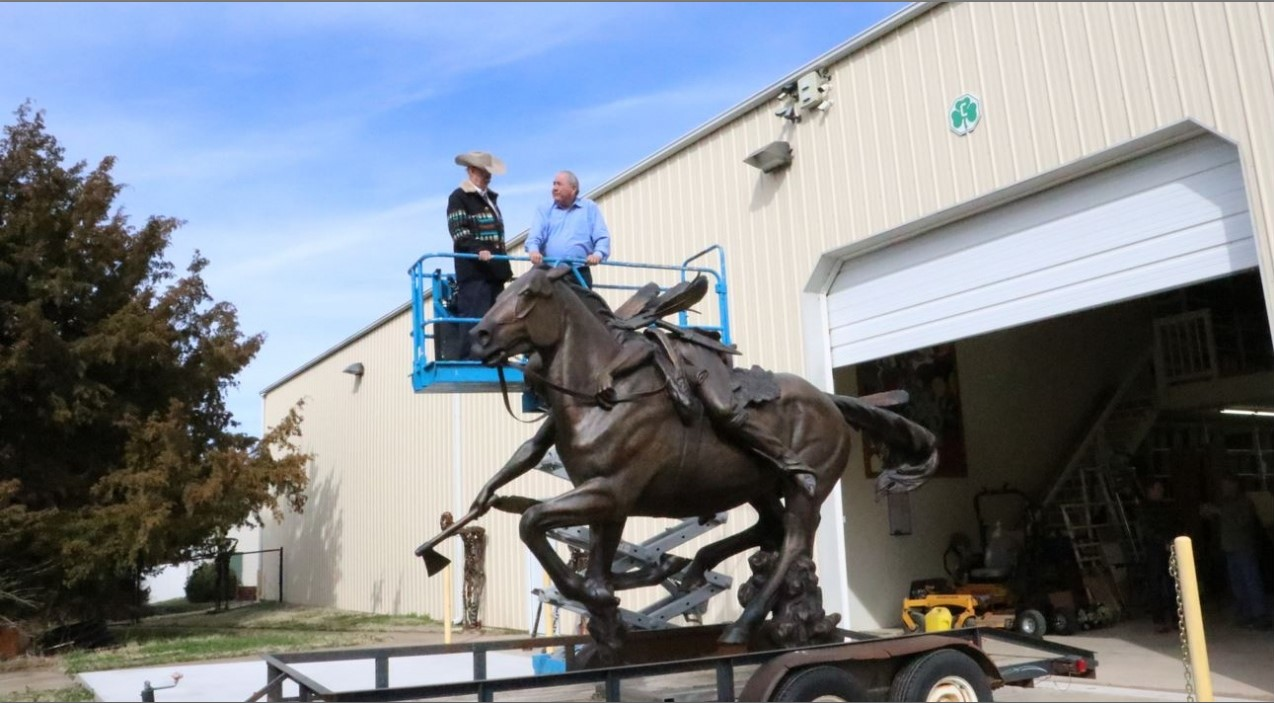
Pickens Museum displayed the monumental sculpture "Osage Warrior in the Enemy Camp" in Ponca City in September 2022.

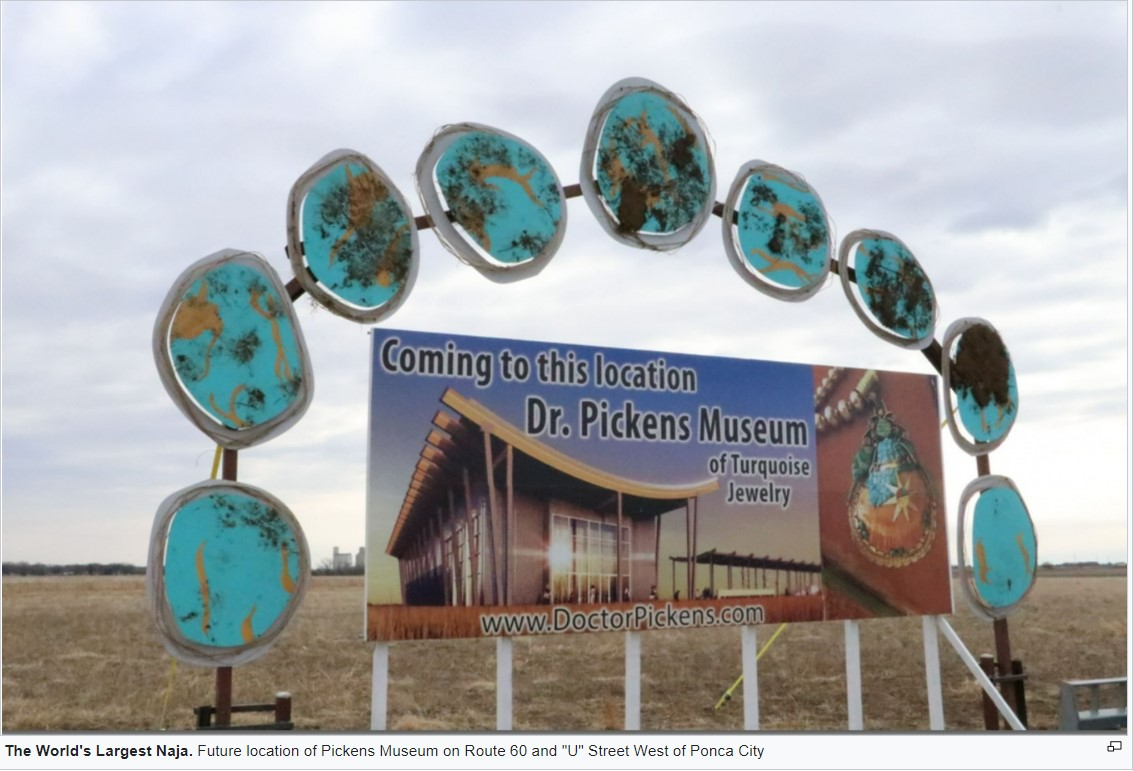
The Worlds Largest Naja is located on the future site of Pickens Museum 2 miles West of Ponca City on Highway 60.

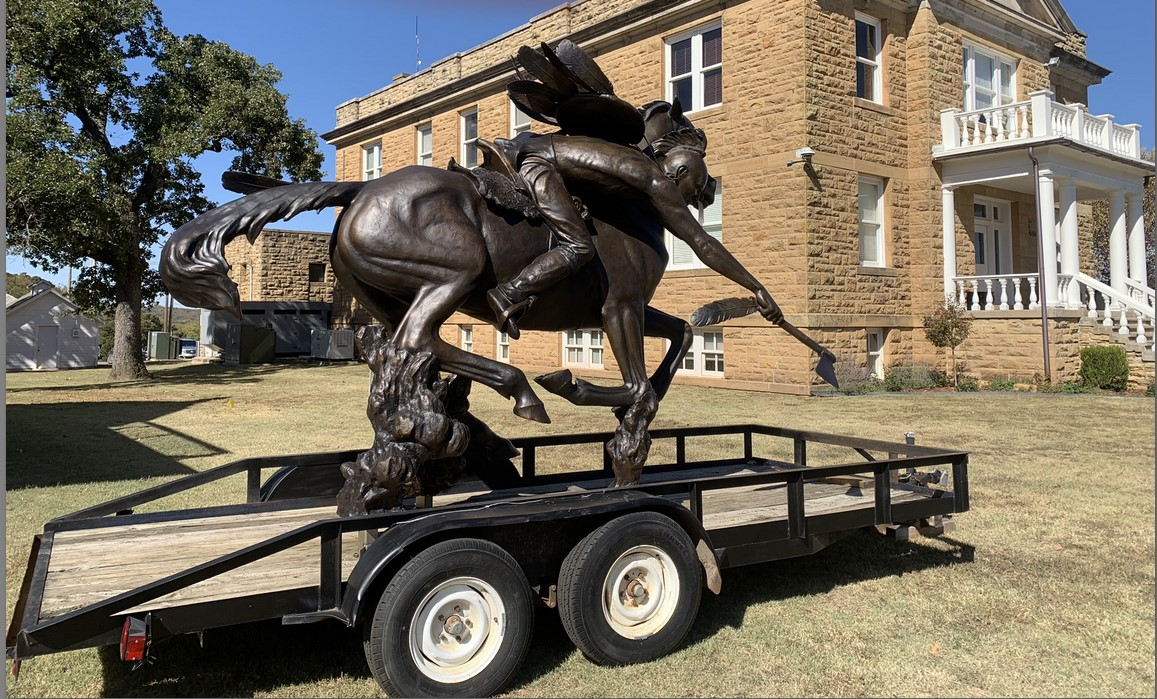
Pickens Museum exhibited "Osage Warrior in the Enemy Camp in Pawhuska in October 2022.

In 2020 the museum opened an exhibition at City Central in Ponca City, Oklahoma titled “Winter in New York” which included three large paintings New York City by Oklahoma artist Roger Disney,. Also in 2020 the museum opened an exhibition in the atrium of City Central at 400 E Central in Ponca City titled “Letter from a Birmingham Jail” which includes eight serigraphs by Faith Ringgold that depict major events in the Civil Rights Movement including “Freedom Summer” in Mississippi in 1964.

Other works at the City Central location is the Pioneer Woman mural representing a Pioneer Woman for the 21st Century; as well as a bronze sculpture "Osage Warrior in the Enemy Camp” by Osage artist John Free; and Stephen Schwark's 20 foot representation of a Naja.

== Woolaroc Museum partnership ==
In August, 2022 Woolaroc museum announced a partnership with Pickens Museum to display select pieces of fine art from the Pickens collection, including works by Native American artists Fritz Scholder, Allan Houser, and Yatika Starr Fields.

== Exhibition in Pawhuska ==
In October 2022 Pickens Museum placed the monumental sculpture "Osage Warrior in the Enemy Camp" on public exhibit between the Office of the Chiefs and the old superintendent’s house on the Osage Nation campus in Pawhuska for the sesquicentennial celebration of the founding of the Osage Reservation in Oklahoma.
