= Senator McGowan =

Senator McGowan may refer to:

- Archibald C. McGowan (1822–1893), New York State Senate
- Jonas H. McGowan (1837–1909), Michigan State Senate
- Thomas F. McGowan (1925–1997), New York State Senate
