= Augustus R. Elwood =

American politician

Augustus Richard Elwood (October 18, 1819 in Richfield Springs, Otsego County, New York – June 10, 1881) was an American merchant and politician from New York.

== Life ==
He entered politics as a Democrat. He was Postmaster of Richfield Springs from 1842 to 1848. On July 16, 1846, he married Olive Beardsley Hyde (1824–1900). In 1848, he joined the Free Soil Party. He was a delegate to the 1856 and 1860 Republican National Conventions. He was Clerk of Otsego County from 1859 to 1861.

He was Supervisor of the Town of Richfield from 1865 to 1868; and a member of the New York State Senate (20th D.) in 1870 and 1871.

He was buried at the Lakeview Cemetery in Richfield Springs.

== Sources ==
- The New York Civil List compiled by Franklin Benjamin Hough, Stephen C. Hutchins and Edgar Albert Werner (1870; pg. 444 and 546)
- Life Sketches of Executive Officers, and Members of the Legislature of the State of New York, Vol. III by H. H. Boone & Theodore P. Cook (1870; pg. 75ff)

New York State Senate
Preceded by John B. Van Petten	New York State Senate; 20th District; 1870–1871	Succeeded by Archibald C. McGowan
