= Frankfort (village), New York =

Frankfort, New York
- Village
- Location within New York Location within the United States
- Coordinates: 43°2′14″N 75°4′19″W
- Country: United States
- State: New York
- County: Herkimer
- Town: Frankfort

Area
  - Total: 1.03 sq mi (2.67 km^{2})
  - Land: 1.02 sq mi (2.63 km^{2})
  - Water: 0.015 sq mi (0.04 km^{2})
- Elevation: 407 ft (124 m)

Population (2020)
  - Total: 2,320
  - Density: 2,288.6/sq mi (883.63/km^{2})
- Time zone: UTC-5 (Eastern (EST))
  - Summer (DST): UTC-4 (EDT)
- ZIP code: 13340
- Area code: 315
- FIPS code: 36-27188
- GNIS feature ID: 0950600
- Website: www.villageoffrankfortny.org

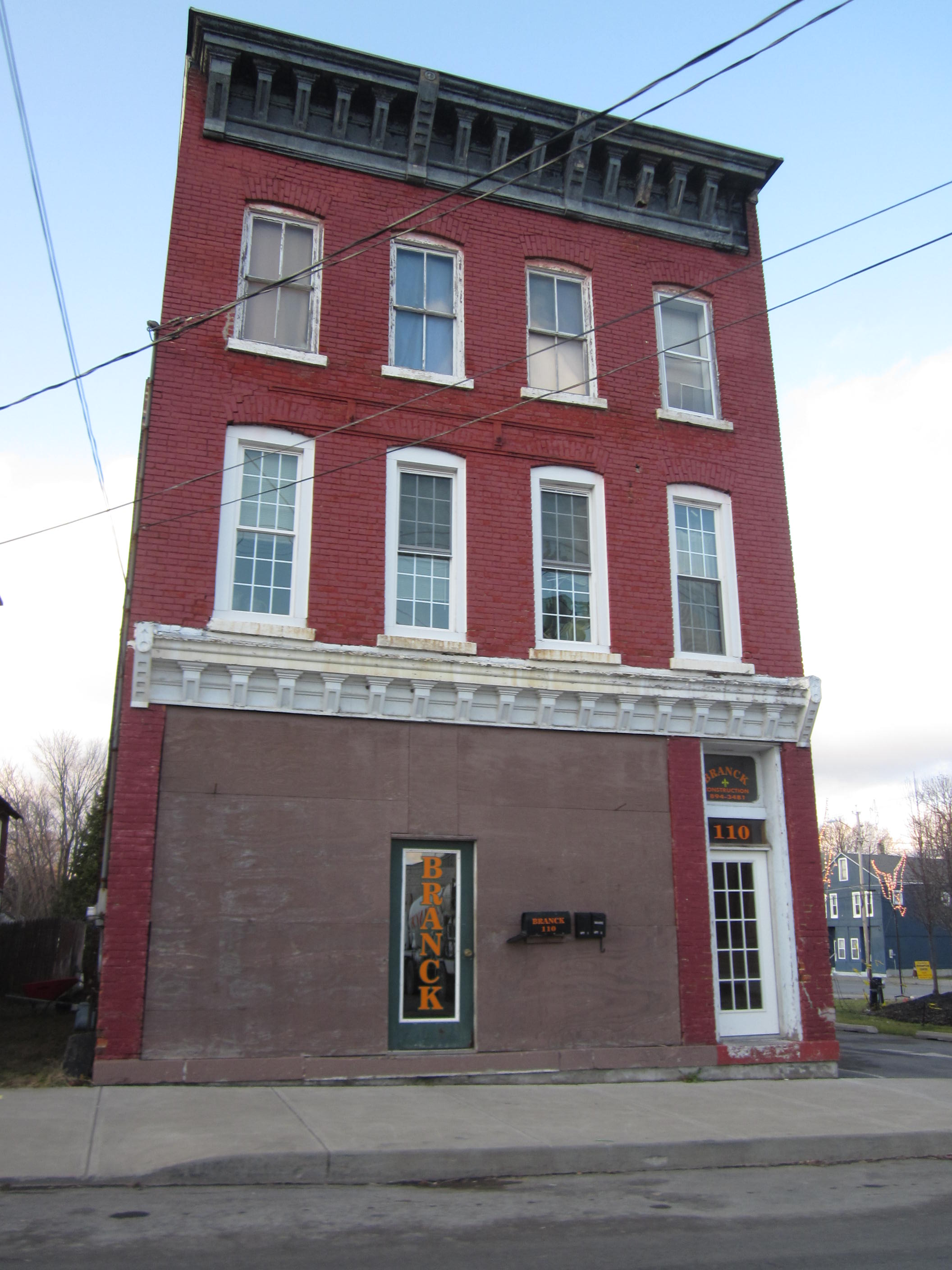
Brick building in Frankfort

Frankfort is a village in the town of Frankfort, Herkimer County, New York, United States. The population was 2,598 at the 2010 census, out of 7,636 people in the entire town. Like the town, the village is named after an early settler, Lawrence (Lewis) Frank.

Frankfort is on the south side of the Erie Canal and east of Utica, New York.

== History ==
The village site was settled prior to 1807. The village was incorporated in 1863.

The Frankfort Town Hall and United States Post Office are listed on the National Register of Historic Places.

== Geography ==
Frankfort village is located in the northeastern part of the town of Frankfort at 43°2′14″N 75°4′18″W (43.037267, -75.071879). According to the United States Census Bureau, the village has a total area of 1.0 square mile (2.7 km^{2}), of which 0.02 square miles (0.04 km^{2}), or 1.67%, are water.

The village is bordered to the north by the Mohawk River. Moyer Creek flows through the village to the Mohawk River.

Frankfort is at the northern terminus of New York State Route 171 (Litchfield Street) with the old New York State Route 5S (Main Street). The new NY 5S does not intersect NY 171; making NY 171 the only state route not to intersect another state route. NY 5S bypasses the village to the south and west, leading west 10 miles (16 km) to Utica and southeast 2.5 miles (4.0 km) to Ilion.

Lying between Frankfort and the Mohawk River is the community of North Frankfort. East Frankfort borders Frankfort on the southeast and Corrado Corners on the southwest.

== Demographics ==
Historical population
Census	Pop.	Note	%±
1870	1,083		—
1880	1,085		0.2%
1890	2,291		111.2%
1900	2,664		16.3%
1910	3,303		24.0%
1920	4,198		27.1%
1930	4,203		0.1%
1940	3,859		−8.2%
1950	3,844		−0.4%
1960	3,872		0.7%
1970	3,305		−14.6%
1980	2,995		−9.4%
1990	2,693		−10.1%
2000	2,537		−5.8%
2010	2,598		2.4%
2020	2,320		−10.7%
U.S. Decennial Census

As of the census of 2010, there were 2,598 people, 1,084 households, and 679 families residing in the village. There were 1,183 housing units, of which 99, or 8.4%, were vacant. The racial makeup of the village was 97.0% white, 0.7% African American, 0.2% Native American, 0.3% Asian, 0.0% Pacific Islander, 0.2% some other race, and 1.6% from two or more races. 1.5% of the population were Hispanic or Latino of any race.

Of the 1,084 households in the village, 31.5% had children under the age of 18 living with them, 40.3% were headed by married couples living together, 14.9% had a female householder with no husband present, and 37.4% were non-families. 31.0% of all households were made up of individuals, and 13.6% were someone living alone who was 65 years of age or older. The average household size was 2.40, and the average family size was 2.96.

23.7% of residents in the village were under the age of 18, 8.7% were from age 18 to 24, 27.4% were from 25 to 44, 25.1% were from 45 to 64, and 15.2% were 65 years of age or older. The median age was 38.5 years. For every 100 females, there were 91.5 males. For every 100 females age 18 and over, there were 89.4 males.

For the period 2011 to 2015, the estimated median annual income for a household was $43,208, and the median income for a family was $54,706. Male full-time workers had a median income of $38,063 versus $34,635 for females. The per capita income for the village was $20,793. 21.6% of the population and 14.6% of families were below the poverty line, along with 30.1% of people under the age of 18 and 7.3% of people 65 or older.

Over the same time period, 40.8% of Frankfort residents reported having Italian ancestry.
