= Mary Myers =

American balloonist (1849–1932)

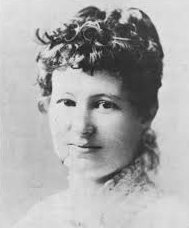
- Meyers (c. 1880)
- Born: Mary Breed Halway; 1849
- Died: 1932 (aged 82–83); Atlanta, Georgia, US
- Occupation: Balloonist
- Spouse: Carl Myers (m. 1871)
- Children: Elizabeth Aerial Wing

Mary Myers (1849–1932), better known during her lifetime as Carlotta, the Lady Aeronaut or Carlotta Myers, was an American balloonist and inventor. She married Carl Edgar Myers in 1871 and, after he became interested in designing balloons and other airships, Myers assisted him in his work and eventually took to testing their designs herself. She made her first balloon trip in front of a crowd of 15,000 people in 1880.

Throughout the 1880s, she worked as a professional balloonist at fairs and exhibitions in the United States. She became known both for skill in handling an untethered balloon and her showmanship. In 1889, she and Carl established the Balloon Farm: a flight school and place for her and Carl to design and test new balloons. She retired from flying in exhibitions in 1891 and from the Balloon Farm in around 1910.

== Early life ==
Mary Breed Halway was born in 1849 to John B. Hawley and Elizabeth Hawley (née Breed). Her mother's family was from Boston, Massachusetts, and her father's were from Connecticut. As of 1871, she was living in Hornell, New York.

== Career ==
=== Marriage and early career ===
On 8 November 1871, Myers married Carl Edgar Myers. Carl worked as a portrait photographer in Hornell until 1875. In 1875, Carl sold his photography business after becoming increasingly interested in the idea of flight— specifically, the idea of balloon flight. He and Myers moved to Mohawk, New York where they worked together designing and creating new styles of balloons and airships. Myers recorded the results of the various experiments, researched meteorology, and sewing up the balloon skins themselves. Having completed their first balloon in 1878, the Myers employed professional balloonists to test out their designs. However, in 1880, Myers and Carl had built a balloon in the shape of an inverted tear-drop, as opposed to the more-common spherical shape. (Carl believed that this new construction would prove beneficial during higher-speed rides). The professional balloonist backed out of the trial, so Carl took the balloon up himself. The experiment proved successful, and Myers, inspired by her husband, decided that she also wanted to become a balloonist.

=== Balloonist ===
Her first flight, in front of 15,00 people, took place in July, 1880, in Little Falls, New York. Before the flight, and feeling that her given name, Mary, was too simple, Myers adopted the moniker "Carlotta" for her public appearances. She went up in the balloon the Aerial alone, bringing along carrier pigeons so that she could provides updates to the spectators, and so that she could ask to be picked up. The flight took thirty-five minutes, and ended when she landed on farm approximately twenty miles away from where she had taken off.

A few months later, for an event at a fair in Norwich, she embarked on her third flight, again in the Aerial. Worried that an approaching storm would cause her audience to leave, Myers took off just as the storm clouds arrived, causing her to be blown off course and she became disorientated. The voyage ended abruptly when she emerged from the cloud and discovered that she had lowered the balloon too quickly. The anchor had become entangled in a tree, stranding her in the air. Myers had already sent off her carrier pigeons, as part of a last-ditch attempt to lose weight and slow her descent. She was noticed by a group of hunters, one of whom sent for help after jokingly asking why she "hadn’t found a taller tree to land in". Her rescue, which she directed, took two hours, and required the removal of six nearby trees.

She and her husband performed often at fairs or other gatherings across the United States and were known for their showmanship. During her performances, Myers would sometimes parachute out of the balloon or act as an elderly woman attempting to seize control of it. She worked for hotels in Saratoga Springs, New York, taking people on sight-seeing trips in her balloons, although she was reluctant to do so. She had several balloons she used regularly such as the Carlotta, the Aerial, the Zephyr, and the Flying Cloud.

Myer's husband published her book, Aerial Adventures of Carlotta; or, Sky-Larking in Cloudland in 1883. The book described many of her balloon trips, and contained newspaper clippings describing her public displays.

=== Balloon farm ===
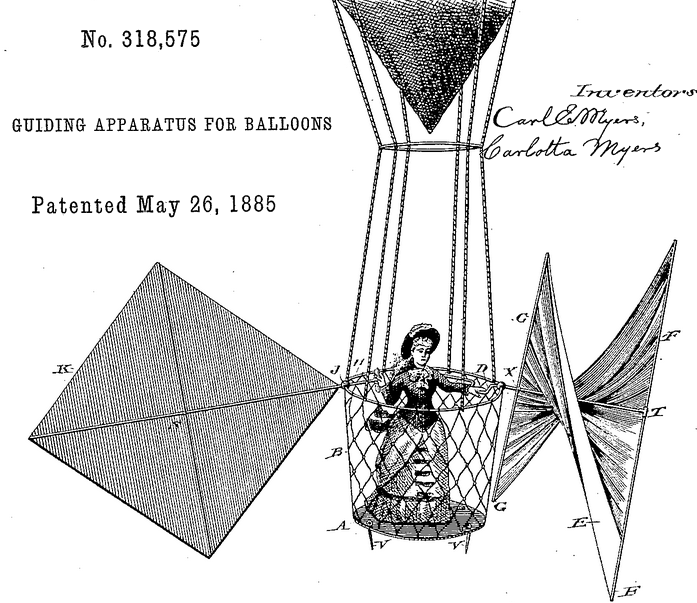
A diagram of Myers' "Guiding Apparatus for Balloons".

In 1889, Carl Myers bought a mansion which he established as what is now called the Balloon Farm: a balloons factory in Frankfort, New York, that also served as a flying school. Myers worked there as a test aeronaut, trying different designs. During this period, she continued to work as a balloonist around New York state, but her trips became less frequent. In 1891, she retired from public life to work exclusively on the farm. At the balloon farm, she and her husband carried out their work designing and building a variety of balloons, including weather balloons for the United States Weather Bureau, balloons for the United States Army Signal Corps to use in the Spanish–American War, and balloons built to order for private individuals and fair hosts. Myers took on a supervisory role at the farm, and was as a "silent partner" by Preston Bassett.

She and Carl retired from the Balloon Farm in around 1910, leaving their daughter to sell the property.

==== Designs ====
Myers assisted in the design, construction, and patenting of Carl's sky-cycles. On May 26, 1885, she and Carl were granted their patent for a "Guiding Apparatus For Balloons" which consisted of a rudder and a sail attached to the side of the balloon's basket.

== Personal life and legacy ==
Myers had one child, a daughter she named Elizabeth Aerial Myers, in spring of 1881. Elizabeth also learned how to fly balloons and airships, and she once flew her father's sky-cycle at an indoor event for the Louisiana Purchase Exposition. However, she refused to fly untethered balloons after a childhood incident where Myers had taken her for a trip over New York in the balloon Carlotta. Midway through the journey, the Carlotta descended too quickly and landed in a lake. Trapped by trees, Myers had her daughter wade through the lake and pull the balloon to safety.

Throughout her career, Myers never had any serious ballooning accidents. Myers and her husband retired from professional balloon making in around 1909 or 1910, and moved into their daughter's home in Atlanta, Georgia. They moved there around the year 1910 or 1919. Myers lived in Atlanta until her death in 1932.

=== Legacy ===
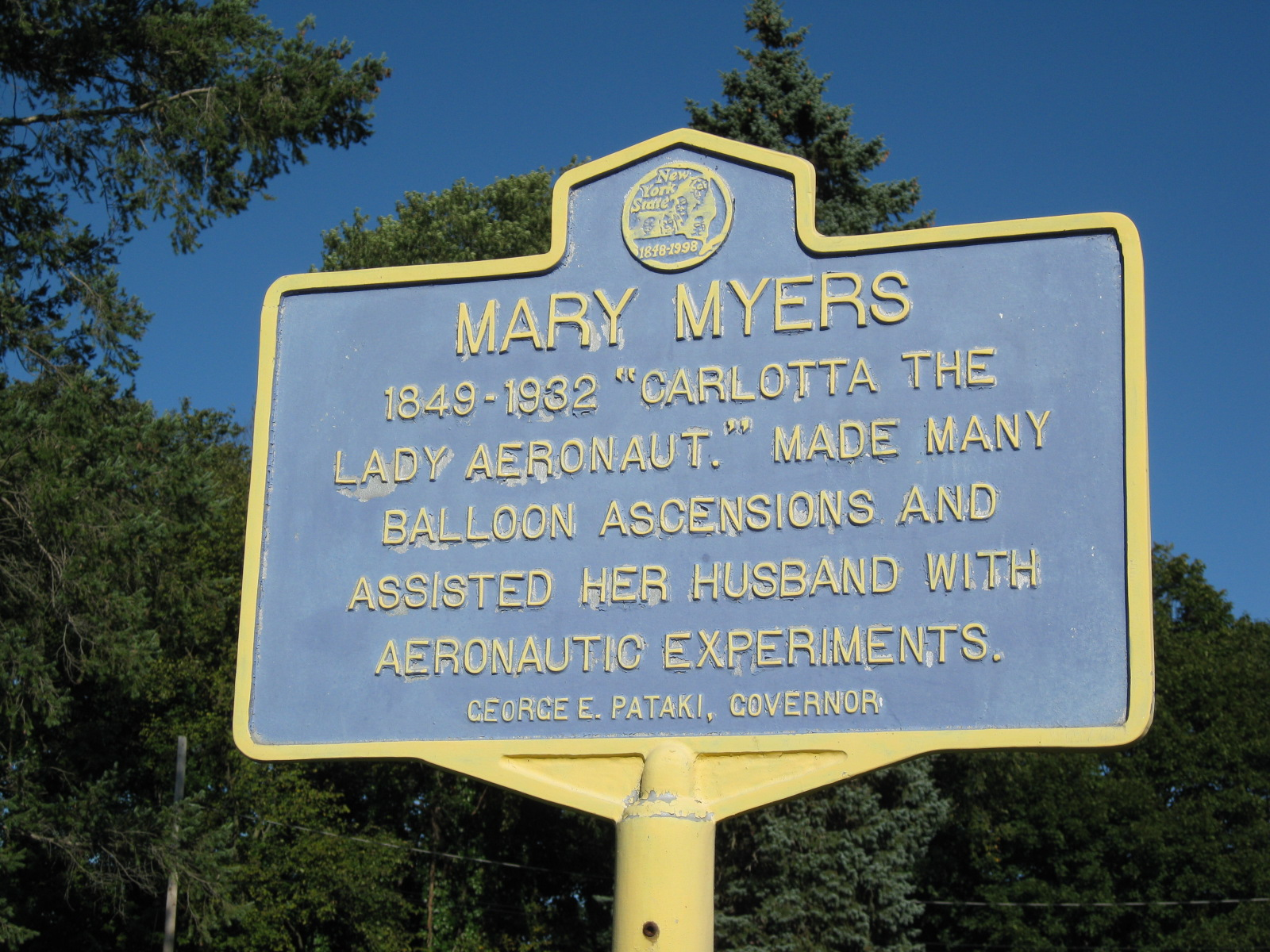
Historic marker commemorating Myers in Frankfort, New York

Myers was one of the first American women to fly solo in a balloon, and has sometimes been recognized as the first American woman to pilot her own aircraft or balloon.

In 1886, the couple tested a balloon which, instead of being filled with hydrogen, was filled with natural gas. Myers took off from Franklin, Pennsylvania, but she reported that the gas valve had become stuck, preventing her from controlling the balloon's ascent. While in flight, her barometer recorded an altitude of 21,000 feet, which would have been a record height for a natural gas balloon to reach. Myers lacked oxygen equipment, and did not report symptoms of altitude sickness such as dizziness or loss of consciousness. She did, however, report that her breathing was impacted.

In a 1966 article for the American Heritage magazine, Preston Bassett said in response to contemporary news articles focusing on her looks that Myers "had to estimate and control with split-second accuracy wind drift, rate of fall, and amount of sideways glide, and make them all come out even at just one point. She was not only daring and pretty; she was something of a genius." Myers also objected to the way she was viewed in the press, denying claims that she performed acrobatics in the balloon and wore circus-costumes.

She was noted for her ability to control an untethered balloon, so much so that she was meant to be able to plan her landing destination before taking off. In this, she was aided by the more flexible basket and rudder system that she and her husband has designed. By putting her weight on different sides of the basket, Myers could exert control over the balloon's flight path. Her study of wind currents and meteorology also helped her plan her landing points.

There is a historic marker in Frankfort commemorating her.

== Publications ==
Myers, Mary (1883). Aerial Adventures of Carlotta; or, Sky-Larking in Cloudland. Mohawk, New York: C. E. Myers.
