= Frankfort Hill District No. 10 School =

- U.S. National Register of Historic Places
- Location within New York Location within the United States
- Nearest city: 2235 Albany Rd., Frankfort Hill, New York
- Coordinates: 43°02′04″N 75°11′05″W
- Area: Less than one acre
- Built: 1846
- NRHP reference No.: 11000401
- Added to NRHP: June 23, 2011

Frankfort Hill District No. 10 School is a historic one-room school building located at Frankfort Hill in Herkimer County, New York. It was built in 1846, and is a 1 1/2-story, rectangular wood-frame building with board-and-batten siding and a steep gable roof. It has a one-story, rear addition and rests on a new concrete and masonry foundation. It remained in use as a school until 1956.

It was listed on the National Register of Historic Places in 2011.
