= United States Post Office (Frankfort, New York) =

- US Post Office-Frankfort
- U.S. National Register of Historic Places
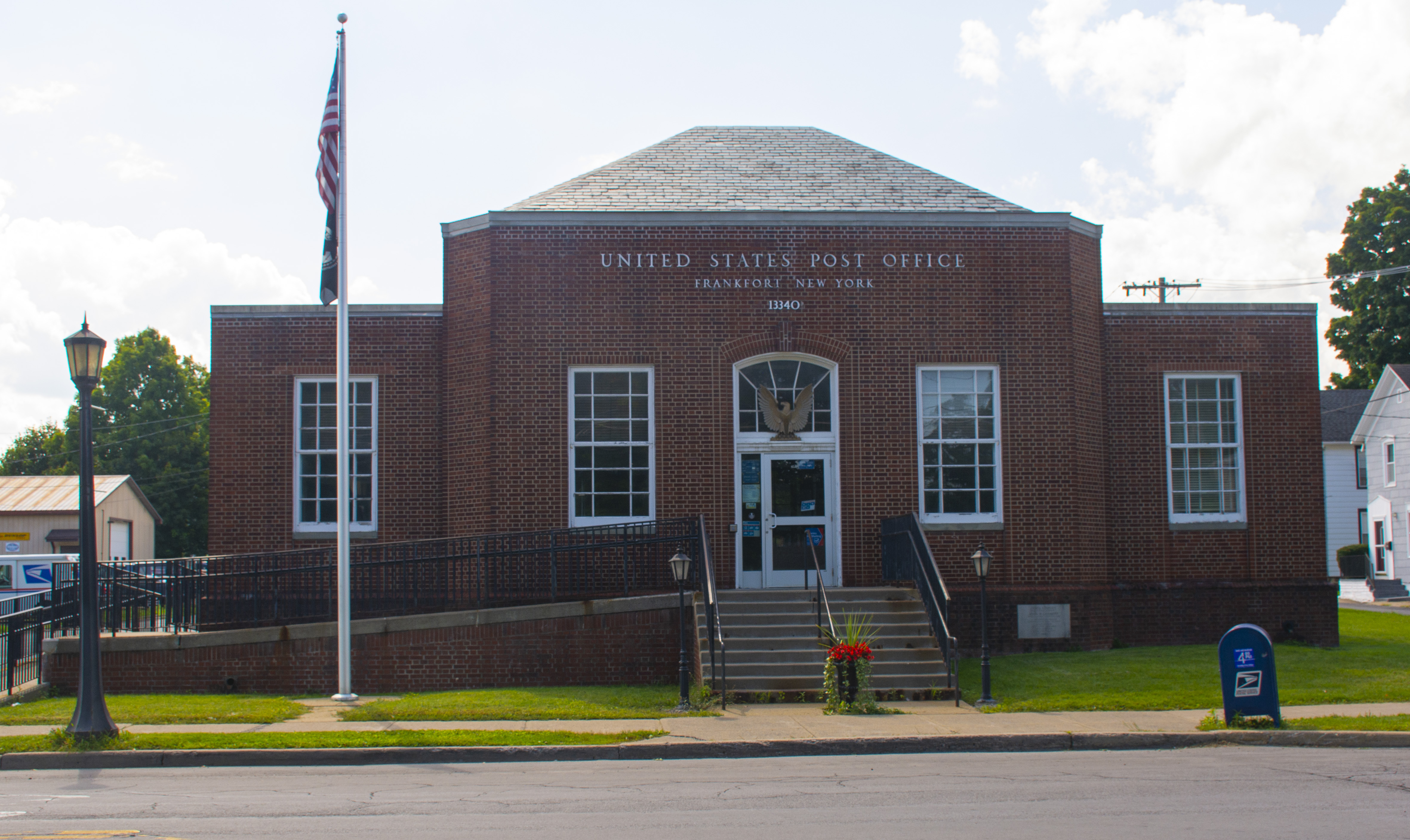

- Location within New York Location within the United States
- Location: 130 E. Main St., Frankfort, New York
- Coordinates: 43°2′18″N 75°4′15″W
- Area: less than one acre
- Built: 1940
- Architect: Louis A. Simon, Albert Wein
- Architectural style: Colonial Revival
- MPS: US Post Offices in New York State, 1858-1943, TR
- NRHP reference No.: 88002512
- Added to NRHP: May 11, 1989

US Post Office-Frankfort is a historic post office building located at Frankfort in Herkimer County, New York, United States. It was built in 1940–1941, and is one of a number of post offices in New York State designed by the Office of the Supervising Architect of the Treasury Department, Louis A. Simon. It is a one-story, five-bay, steel frame building on a raised foundation in the Colonial Revival style. It features a three-bay central pavilion surmounted by a slate-covered hipped roof. The interior features a 1942 wood relief by artist Albert Wein titled "Growth."

It was listed on the National Register of Historic Places in 1989.
