= Archibald C. McGowan =

American politician

- Born: August 26, 1822; Pownal, Bennington County, Vermont
- Died: February 20, 1893 (aged 70); Frankfort, Herkimer County, New York
- Spouse: Mary Louisa Rogers (1825–1897)
- Parent(s): Clark McGowan; Mary Carpenter

Archibald C. McGowan (August 26, 1822 – February 20, 1893) was an American merchant and politician from New York.

== Life ==
He was the son of Clark McGowan (died 1824) and Mary (Carpenter) McGowan (died 1824). He attended the district schools, and Jonesville Academy in Saratoga County, New York. About 1839, he began to work as a clerk in Troy, and in 1845 became a partner in a canal store in Clifton Park, and engaged in the coal and lumber trade. In 1846, he married Mary Louisa Rogers (1825–1897), and they had three children.

In 1854, he moved to Herkimer County, New York, and founded McGowansville (now East Frankfort). There he built a dry dock, opened a general store, ran canal boats, and became President of the Frankfort and Ilion Railroad.

He was a member of the New York State Assembly (Herkimer Co., 2nd D.) in 1863 and 1866; and of the New York State Senate (20th D.) from 1872 to 1875, sitting in the 95th, 96th, 97th and 98th New York State Legislatures.

He died on February 20, 1893, in Frankfort, New York, and was buried at the Oak Hill Cemetery in Herkimer.

== Sources ==
- The New York Civil List compiled by Franklin Benjamin Hough, Stephen C. Hutchins and Edgar Albert Werner (1870; pg. 498 and 504)
- Biographical Sketches of the State Officers and the Members of the Legislature of the State of New York in 1862 and '63 by William D. Murphy (1863; pg. 364ff)

New York State Assembly
Preceded by George Springer	New York State Assembly; Herkimer County, 2nd District; 1863	Succeeded by Ezra D. Beckwith
Preceded by E. Bradley Lee	New York State Assembly; Herkimer County, 2nd District; 1866	Succeeded by Seth M. Richmond
New York State Senate
Preceded by Augustus R. Elwood	New York State Senate; 20th District; 1872–1875	Succeeded by David P. Loomis
