= Frankfort Town Hall =

- U.S. National Register of Historic Places
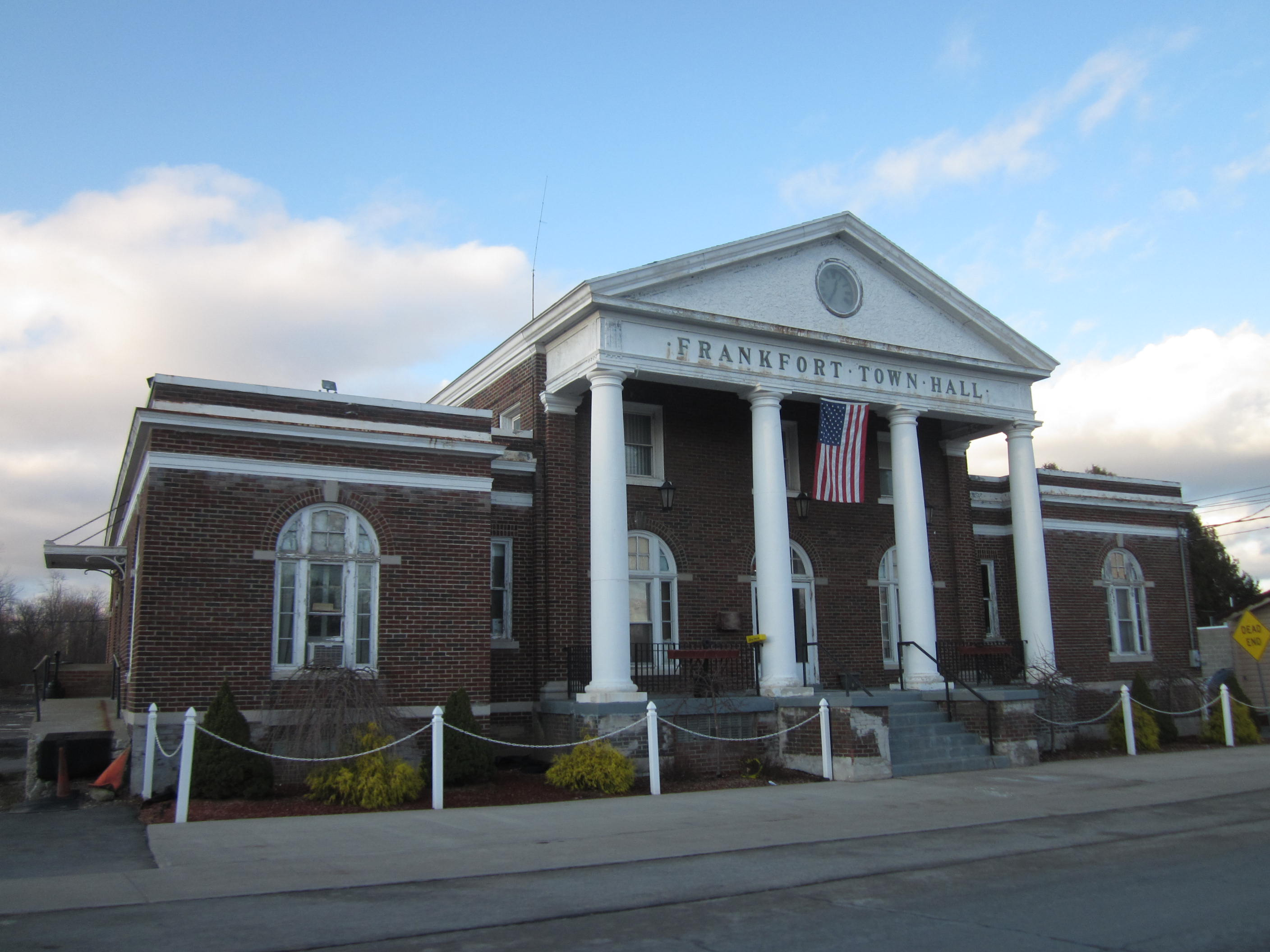
- Frankfort Town Hall, January 2012

- Location within New York Location within the United States
- Location: 140 S. Litchfield St., Frankfort, New York
- Coordinates: 43°2′20″N 75°4′23″W
- Area: 2 acres (0.81 ha)
- Built: 1924
- Architectural style: Classical Revival
- NRHP reference No.: 99001486
- Added to NRHP: December 9, 1999

Frankfort Town Hall is a historic town hall in Frankfort, Herkimer County, New York. It is a T-shaped structure with a two-story, gable roofed main block, three bays wide, flanked by identical one-story wings. It is built of hollow tile faced with red brick and cast stone trim. It features a monumental portico consisting of smooth Doric order columns supported a molded wood frieze and triangular pediment.

It was listed on the National Register of Historic Places in 1999.
