= Balloon Farm (Frankfort, New York) =

Historic house in New York, United States

- U.S. National Register of Historic Places
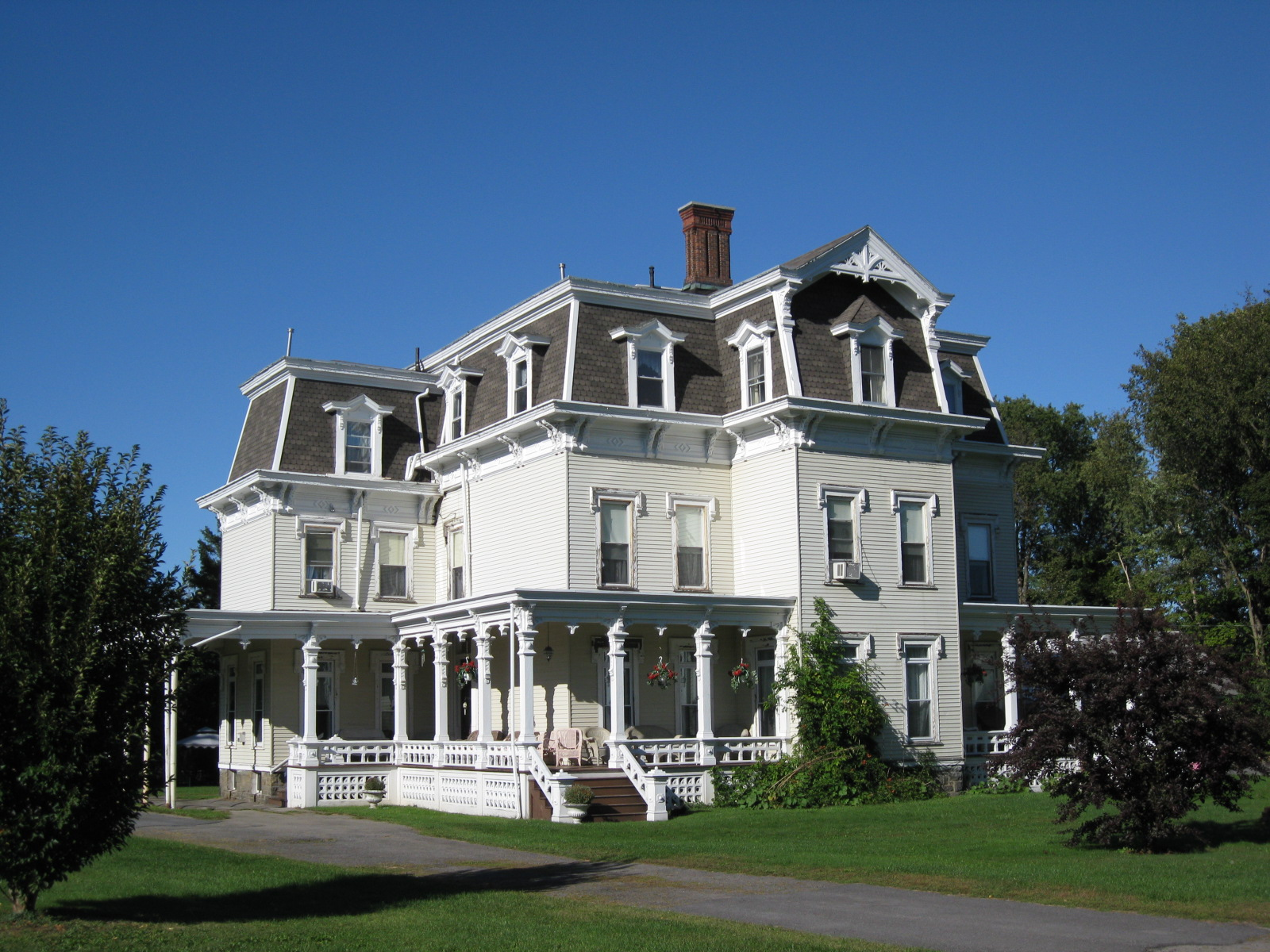
- Balloon Farm, September 2009

- Location within New York Location within the United States
- Location: 128 Cemetery Rd., Frankfort, New York
- Coordinates: 43°2′26″N 75°4′45″W
- Area: 1.67 acres (0.68 ha)
- Built: 1878
- Architectural style: Late Victorian
- NRHP reference No.: 98000391
- Added to NRHP: April 23, 1998

The Balloon Farm, originally called the Gates Manshion, is a historic home located at Frankfort in Herkimer County, New York. It includes the Gates-Myers Residence, built in 1878. It is an imposing, nearly square, three-story eclectic Late Victorian dwelling built of dimension lumber above a cut-stone foundation.

The house was built in Fred Gates, the owner of a match company. He sold it in 1889 to Carl Edgar Myers (1842–1925), an aeronautical engineer. Myers converted the house and the nearby lands into an aeronautical institution known as "Balloon Farm." His wife Mary, known as "Carlotta, the Lady Aeronaut", made many ascents in balloons in aid of his experiments. She is noted by a historical marker near the property.

The property was listed on the National Register of Historic Places in 1998.

== Gallery ==
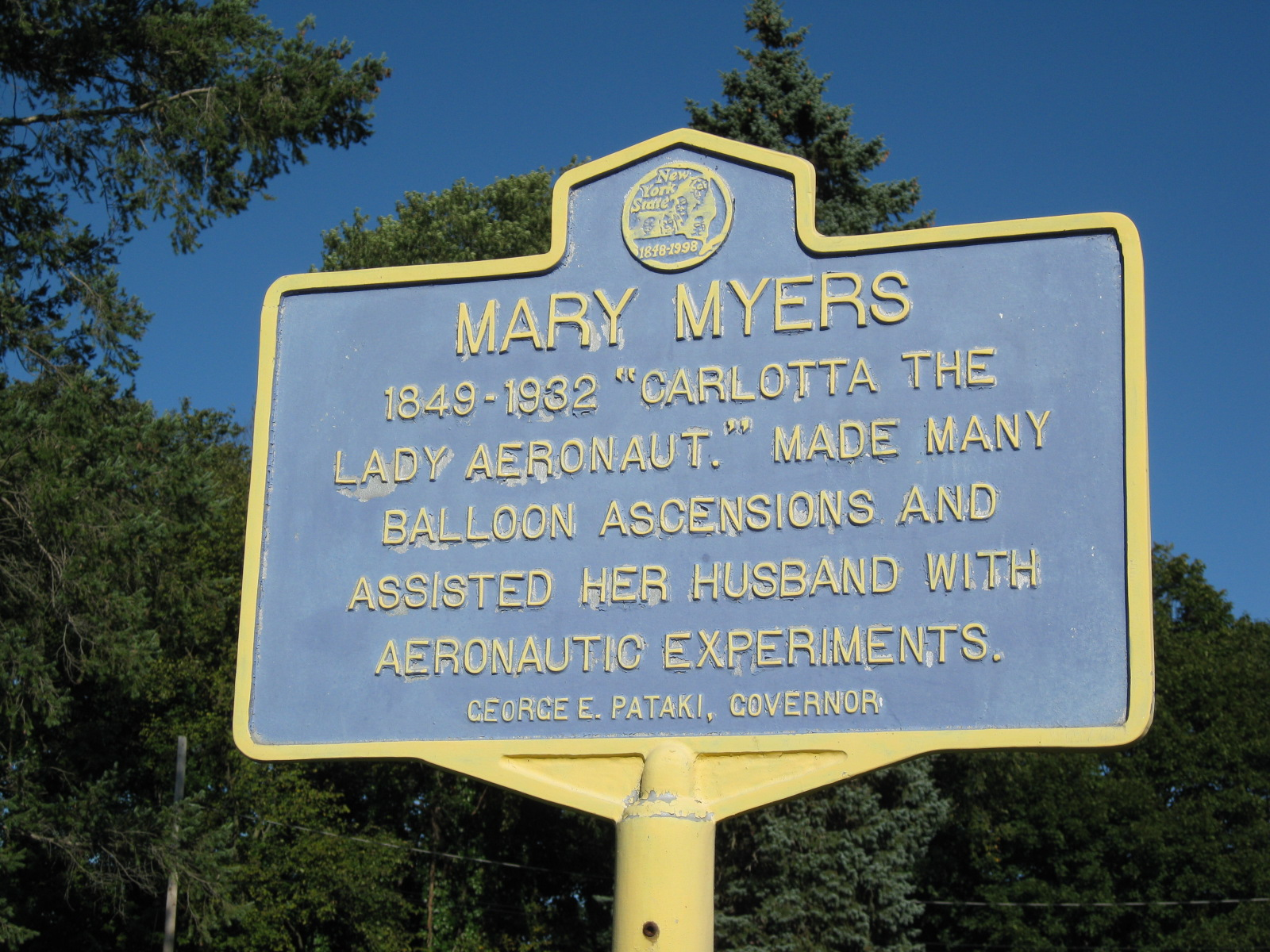
Marker for Mary Myers, who made many ascents from the Balloon Farm; Marker, September 2009
