= Frankfort, New York =

- Town
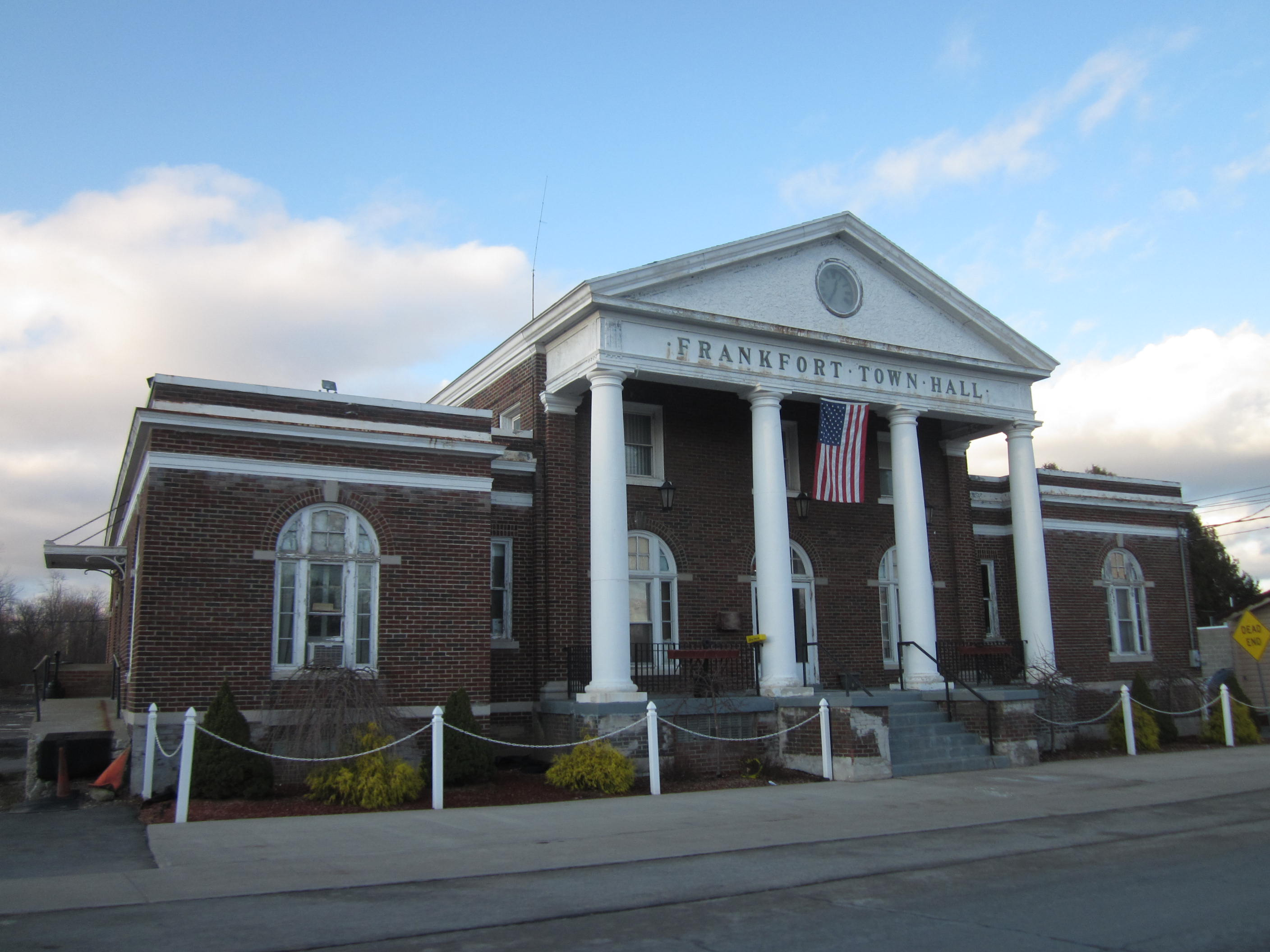
- Town Hall

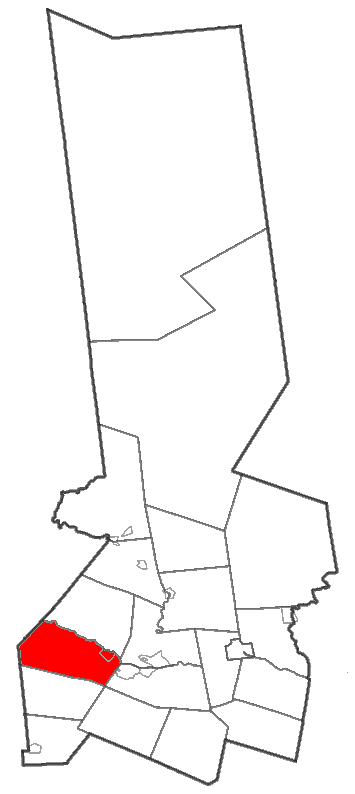
- Location of Frankfort in Herkimer County

- Location within New York Location within the United States
- Coordinates: 43°02′20″N 75°04′14″W
- Country: United States
- State: New York
- County: Herkimer

Government
  - Type: Town Council
  - Town Supervisor: Joseph P. Kinney (R)
  - Town Council: Members' List: • Darlene A. Balio-Abbatecola (R); • Joseph D. Tamburro; • Michael S. Testa (D); • John L. Wallace (R)

Area
  - Total: 36.53 sq mi (94.61 km^{2})
  - Land: 36.43 sq mi (94.36 km^{2})
  - Water: 0.093 sq mi (0.24 km^{2})

Population (2020)
  - Total: 7,011
- ZIP Codes: 13340 (Frankfort); 13357 (Ilion); 13413 (New Hartford); 13456 (Sauquoit)
- FIPS code: 36-043-27199
- Website: www.townoffrankfortny.gov

Frankfort is a town in Herkimer County, New York, United States. The town is named after one of its earliest settlers, Lawrence (Lewis) Frank. The town of Frankfort includes a village, also called Frankfort. Frankfort is located east of Utica, and the Erie Canal passes along its northern border. At the time of the 2020 census, the population was 7,011, down from 7,636 in 2010.

== History ==
The first European settlers in this area were German Palatines who came to the colony as religious refugees in 1723. During the French and Indian War, this area suffered fierce attacks by the French with their Indian allies, and the settlers abandoned much of the area. The area of the early town was resettled before 1794, by the granting of land patents.

Perspective map of Frankfort and list of landmarks from 1887 by [[L.R Burleigh]]

After the Revolutionary War, the town of Frankfort was established from part of the town of German Flatts. In 1798, the northwest part of Frankfort was taken away to form part of the town of Deerfield.

In 1976, part of the former Sperry Univac property was redeveloped as the Charlestown Outlet Complex. Charlestown Mall later operated on the western portion of the site until 1991, when the property became the Charlestown Business Complex.

The Balloon Farm in Frankfort was listed on the National Register of Historic Places in 1998.

== Geography ==
According to the United States Census Bureau, Frankfort has an area of 36.5 square miles (94.6 km^{2}), of which 36.4 square miles (94.3 km^{2}) are land and 0.1 square miles (0.3 km^{2}), or 0.29%, are water.

The western border of the town is the Oneida County line, and the northern border is the Mohawk River. Moyer Creek and Ferguson Creek flow northward through Frankfort to the Mohawk River.

New York State Route 5S runs parallel to the Mohawk River. New York State Route 171 intersects old NY 5S in the village of Frankfort.

== Demographics ==
Historical population
Census	Pop.	Note	%±
1820	1,860		—
1830	2,620		40.9%
1840	3,096		18.2%
1850	3,023		−2.4%
1860	3,247		7.4%
1870	3,065		−5.6%
1880	3,025		−1.3%
1890	3,988		31.8%
1900	4,472		12.1%
1910	5,105		14.2%
1920	6,483		27.0%
1930	6,918		6.7%
1940	6,247		−9.7%
1950	6,598		5.6%
1960	7,550		14.4%
1970	7,805		3.4%
1980	7,686		−1.5%
1990	7,494		−2.5%
2000	7,463		−0.4%
2010	7,636		2.3%
2020	7,011		−8.2%
U.S. Decennial Census

As of the 2020 census, there were 7,011 people and 3,251 households residing in Frankfort. The population density was 192.5 inhabitants per square mile (74.3/km^{2}). There were 3,251 housing units at an average density of 89.26 per square mile (34.46/km^{2}). The racial makeup of the town was 92.60% White, 1.04% African American, 0.13% Native American and Alaska Native, 0.39% Asian, 0.20% from other races, and 3.54% from two or more races. Hispanic or Latino of any race were 2.08% of the population.

Data from the American Community Survey in 2022 estimated 3,081 households and 1,863 total families, out of which 26.5% had children under the age of 18 living with them, 46.6% were married couples living together, 27.9% had a female householder with no spouse present, 16.7% had a male householder with no spouse present, and 39.5% were non-families. 19.2% of all households were made up of individuals, and 37.9% had someone living alone who was 65 years or older. The average household size was 2.27 and the average family size was 2.91.

In the town, the population was 19.7% under the age of 18, 8.1% from 18 to 24, 22.4% from 25 to 44, 26.8% from 45 to 64, and 22.9% who were 65 years or older. The median age was 44.7 years. For every 100 females age 18 and over, there were 97.7 males.

The median income for a household in the town was $65,919, and the median income for a family was $72,056. Males had a median income of $54,699 versus $30,208 for females. The per capita income for the town was $39,448. About 7.4% of the population were below the poverty line, including 13.9% of those under age 18 and 4.1% of those age 65 or over.

Frankfort has a large Italian American population. Many Italian American families in the town and village are descendants of immigrants from Oriolo, Cosenza, or Calabria, Italy and from San Giuseppe Iato, Sicily. The first settler from Oriolo may have been Giuseppe Franchino, who appeared in the 1880 census as Joseph Frank, age 33, birthplace Italy.

== Communities and locations in the town of Frankfort ==
- Corrado Corners – A hamlet immediately southwest of Frankfort village.
- Dutch Hill – An elevation in the northern part of Frankfort.
- East Frankfort – A hamlet immediately southeast of Frankfort village, located on NY-5S at the eastern town line. It was previously called "McGowansville". East Frankfort borders the village of Ilion.
- Frankfort – A village in the northeastern part of the town, located on NY-5S at the Mohawk River.
- Frankfort Center – A hamlet west of Frankfort village, located on County Road 13. It was previously called "Howards Bush."
- Frankfort Gorge – A valley containing Moyer Creek that extends from the southern town line up to Frankfort village.
- Frankfort Hill – A location in the western part of the town, north of Stewart Corners on County Road 104. The Frankfort Hill District No. 10 School was listed on the National Register of Historic Places in 2011.
- Gulph – A hamlet by the southern town line on NY-171.
- Harbor – A hamlet in the northwestern part of the town, east of West Frankfort on NY-5S by County Road 240.
- Joslin Hill – An elevation located southwest of Frankfort.
- Kinney Corners – A location on the southern town line on County Road 27. The Remington House was added to the National Register of Historic Places in 1997.
- Maggie's Bush – A former community in the western part of Frankfort.
- North Frankfort – A location north of Frankfort village, near the Mohawk River.
- Stewart Corners – A hamlet in the western part of the town at the junction of County Roads 104 and 186.
- West Frankfort – A hamlet on NY-5S near the western town line in the northwestern corner of the town. It was originally called "Four Mile Grocery."

== Herkimer County Fair ==
The Herkimer County Fair is a six-day fair held annually in Frankfort. The fair was started in 1841 as the Herkimer County Agricultural Society, and traveled from village to village. In the 1900s, the fair was located at a site which later became the Hekimer Thruway interchange. At that time, the fair had a racetrack and grandstand which were later destroyed by a fire. After moving to Frankfort in 1950, the fair became an annual event. In 1958, it moved to a permanent site on Cemetery Hill in Frankfort, after buying the Slocum Farm. The fair currently sits on 26 acres (11 ha), and has 10 permanent buildings as well a permanent bathroom, shower facilities, a horse corral, and aluminum bleacher seating surrounding the event show ring.

== Notable people ==
- Charles A. Budlong, Wisconsin State Assemblyman, was born in Frankfort.
- Hiram Cronk, the last surviving veteran of the War of 1812 at the time of his death, was born in Frankfort.
- Carl Edgar Myers, owned "balloon farm" business with Carlotta, the Lady Aeronaut.
- Abram B. Steele, lawyer and member of the New York State Assembly
- Rich Talarico, a writer, director, producer and actor known mostly for Comedy Central's Key and Peele, was born in Frankfort.

== Sources ==
- Dieffenbacher, Jane W. (2002). Herkimer County Valley Towns. Arcadia Publishing. ISBN 978-0-7385-0977-8.
