= Jolene Bird =

Lapidary artist from Santo Domingo Pueblo

Jolene Bird (born 1963) is a Kewa lapidary artist and jeweler from Santo Domingo Pueblo.

Bird learned lapidary arts and jewelry making from her grandfather. From him, she learned to identify and select high-grade stones for use in traditional Santo Domingo inlay work. She went on to study silversmithing at the Poeh Institute and Art Center on the Pojoaque Pueblo north of Santa Fe, New Mexico. Bird hand-cuts and finishes each individual bead and piece of stone inlay for her works, and is well known for her mosaic inlay objects and jewelry.

Her work has been exhibited at the Smithsonian Institution National Museum of the American Indian, Santa Fe Indian Market, and at several museum venues. Bird has won several awards for her stone inlay work.

== Collections ==
Her work is held in the permanent collection of the Eiteljorg Museum of American Indians and Western Art, the Heard Museum, the Smithsonian Museum, and the Pickens Museum.
