= Remington House (Kinne Corners, New York) =

Historic house in New York, United States

- U.S. National Register of Historic Places
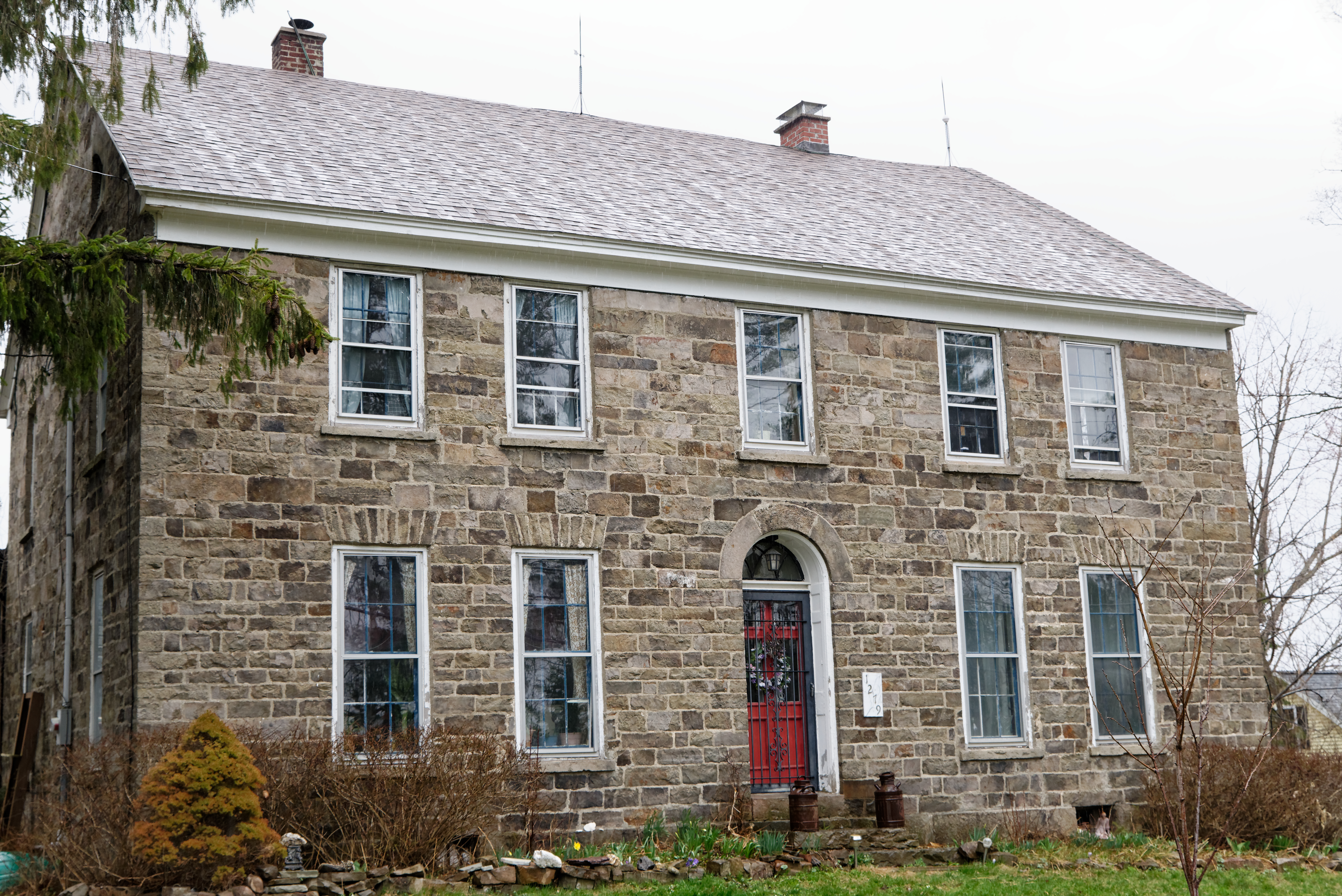
- Remington House in 2019

- Location within New York Location within the United States
- Nearest city: Kinne Corners, New York
- Coordinates: 42.99097°N 75.08617°W
- Area: 2 acres (0.81 ha)
- Built: 1810
- Architectural style: Early Republic, Federal
- NRHP reference No.: 97000942
- Added to NRHP: August 21, 1997

Remington House is a historic home located at Kinne Corners in Herkimer County, New York. It is a 2 1/2-story, rectangular, gable-roofed dwelling constructed of locally quarried fieldstone. It was built about 1810 (1799 according to the historical marker) by Eliphalet Remington and occupied by the Remington family during the formative period of their firearms manufacturing enterprises, Remington Arms.

It was listed on the National Register of Historic Places in 1997.
