= Abram B. Steele =

American lawyer and politician (1845–1913)

Abram Books Steele (January 10, 1845 – March 28, 1913) was an American lawyer and politician from Herkimer, New York.

== Life ==
Steele was born on January 10, 1845, in Columbus, Ohio, the son of farmer George C. Steele and Rebecca Fisher. His parents lived in Rochelle, Illinois, but they were visiting Columbus when he was born.

Steele attended the local common schools, took a course at the Seminary at Rochelle, and finished a two-year course at Wheaton College in 1866. Interested in becoming a lawyer, he worked as a teacher in Rochelle for nine months to pay for his legal studies. He then worked as principal of the school in Ashton for a few months. In April 1867, he went to the law office of his cousin Josiah A. Steele in Frankfort, New York. He was admitted to the bar in April 1868 and formed a partnership with his cousin known as J. A. and A. B. Steele. He practiced with the firm for a year, after which he went to Lincoln, Nebraska to see how promising the legal prospects were. He was quickly admitted to the bar and formed a copartnership with Nebraska Attorney General Seth Robinson, but after three months there he concluded there were too many lawyers in Lincoln and returned to his law practice with his cousin Josiah in Frankfurt. In February 1870, he moved to Herkimer while Josiah stayed in Frankfort. Josiah also moved to Herkimer in 1874, and the law firm continued until it was dissolved in 1880. He practiced alone until 1882, when he formed a law with William C. Prescott that lasted until his death.

Steele served as attorney for the village of Herkimer from 1873 to 1875, during which time he secured a charter that incorporated the village and conferred the authority for the expenditure for such funds for public improvements as the citizens should vote. He also secured a charter for the incorporation of the Herkimer and Mohawk Street Railway, which later became the forerunner to a system connecting the villages of Herkimer, Mohawk, Ilion, and Frankfort. He spent a few months in Europe in 1878 for health reasons. In 1879, he was elected district attorney of Herkimer County, an office he was reelected to in 1882. As district attorney, he was called upon to try many capital crime cases, including the Druse murder, and convicted the first person executed in the county. He was trustee of the village of Herkimer from 1887 to 1888, during which time the water works were put in. He was president of the village for two terms, from 1890 to 1891, during which time an electric light system was installed in the village. He was also town clerk of Frankfort at one point.

Steele was a delegate to the 1894 New York State Constitutional Convention. He was a member of the Herkimer Board of Education for at least a decade. In 1903, he was elected to the New York State Assembly as a Republican, representing Herkimer County. He served in the Assembly in 1904, 1905, and 1906. He became a charter member of the Fort Dayton Hose Company, and when the company was disbanded in 1893 he became an exempt fireman. He was also chairman of the law committee of the State Firemen's Association and a trustee of the Firemen's Home in Hudson.

Steele joined the Empire State Society of the Sons of the American Revolution in 1896. He was also a member of the Freemasons, the Herkimer County Historical Society, the New York State Bar Association, the Herkimer County Bar Association, and the Herkimer County Agricultural Association. In 1885, he married Franc Irwin of Poland, Herkimer County, New York. They had no children.

Steele died at home from cirrhosis of the liver with uraemic poisoning on March 28, 1913. Rev. E. Scott Farley officiated his funeral at the Baptist Church. The funeral was attended by the local Freemasons, the Herkimer County Bar Association, the Fort Dayton Hose Company, the Down and Out Club, and the Mohawk Valley Chapter of the Sons of the American Revolution. The honorary pallbearers were trustees of the Baptist Church, and the active pallbearers were members of the Little Falls Commandery. He was buried in Oak Hill Cemetery.

New York State Assembly
Preceded by Samuel M. Allston	New York State Assembly; Herkimer County; 1904–1906	Succeeded by Thomas D. Ferguson
