= East Frankfort, New York =

- Census-designated place
- Location within New York Location within the United States
- Coordinates: 43°1′16″N 75°3′28″W
- Country: United States
- State: New York
- County: Herkimer
- Town: Frankfort

Area
  - Total: 0.79 sq mi (2.05 km^{2})
  - Land: 0.79 sq mi (2.05 km^{2})
  - Water: 0 sq mi (0.00 km^{2})
- Elevation: 420 ft (128 m)

Population (2020)
  - Total: 496
  - Density: 626/sq mi (241.7/km^{2})
- Time zone: UTC-5 (Eastern (EST))
  - Summer (DST): UTC-4 (EDT)
- ZIP Code: 13357 (Ilion)
- Area codes: 315/680
- FIPS code: 36-22029
- GNIS feature ID: 2806939

East Frankfort is a hamlet and census-designated place (CDP) in the town of Frankfort in Herkimer County, New York. As of the 2020 census, East Frankfort had a population of 496. It was first listed as a CDP prior to the 2020 census.

== History ==
The hamlet was founded in 1854 by Archibald C. McGowan and was originally known as "McGowansville".

== Geography ==
The community is in western Herkimer County, on the eastern edge of the town of Frankfort. It is bordered to the east by the town of German Flatts and the village of Ilion. The village of Frankfort is 1 mile (1.6 km) to the north.

New York State Route 5S, a limited-access highway, forms the northern edge of the CDP, with access from Acme Road/West Main Street at the northeast corner of the community. Route 5S leads east past Ilion 3 miles (5 km) to Mohawk and northwest 11 miles (18 km) to Utica.

== Demographics ==
Historical population
Census	Pop.	Note	%±
2020	496		—
U.S. Decennial Census
