= Albert Wein =

American sculptor

- Born: 1915
- Died: 1991 (aged 75–76)
- Education: 1927: Enrolled in Maryland Institute 1932: Enrolled in Beaux-Arts institute in New York 1934: Joined W.P.A. 1947: Won a scholarship to the American Academy in Rome
- Style: Wein was adept at creating monumental, architectural, garden, memorial sculpture

Albert W. Wein (1915–1991) was an American sculptor.

Wein was born in New York City on July 27, 1915. His mother, Elsa Meher Wein was a portrait painter and it was through her that Wein was first introduced to art. He began his art studies at the Maryland Institute of Fine and Applied Arts at the age of twelve, where his mother taught. In 1929 he and his family moved to New York City, where he continued his studies at the National Academy of Design he studied with painter Ivan Olinsky. In 1932 he enrolled at the Beaux-Arts Institute of Design. He also studied with Hans Hofmann.

In 1932, he joined the WPA and created numerous works in this stylization. A 1942 wood relief titled "Growth" was installed at the U.S. Post Office (Frankfort, New York) under the auspices of the Treasury Department's, Section of Fine Arts.

In 1938, he married Toby Gold and they had a son. The marriage was short lived and ended in divorce.

In 1947 he won the Rome Prize scholarship to the American Academy in Rome, where he would stay for two years. During that period he traveled through Europe, exposing himself to Greek and Roman sculptural precedents.

Wein was one of 250 sculptors who exhibited in the 3rd Sculpture International held at the Philadelphia Museum of Art in the summer of 1949.

He returned to the United States and in 1950 joined the National Sculpture Society. As many of the other sculptors of his era Wein was adept at creating monumental, architectural, garden, memorial sculpture. He was also accomplished at bas-relief and produced work for the Steuben Glass Company as well as being a member of the Society of Medallists.

In 1955 Wein moved to California where, besides creating sculpture for numerous synagogues and for private collections, he drew upon his experience in New York Theatre and designed sets for television studios including working as art director for the Ernie Kovacs Show. Wein experimented with a vast range of media, materials and explored figurative abstraction in both his sculpture and painting, from cubist to free-form while on the west coast. He had a number of one-man exhibitions in California and had numerous radio and television interviews. During this period he also produced a number of fine erotic sculptures. Some of these were used by a psychiatrist to help his patients.

He was also artist-in-residence at both Brandeis University and the University of Wyoming.

In the late sixties he moved back to New York and settled in Westchester County. He became a fellow of the National Sculpture Society and was elected to Academician of the National Academy of Design. His attention returned to a more representation of the figure and as he said "modernizing the classical tradition" which continued until his death.

Wein's ten-foot limestone statue of "Phryne Before the Judges" was commissioned by Anna Hyatt Huntington and is located in Brookgreen Gardens.

In 1975, he was commissioned to create North America's largest granite relief; A 27 ft x 27 ft. granite relief on Libby Dam which is located in Montana. His design was picked unanimously by the judges for its wonderfully designed and clear image which could still be seen from afar. Albert and his wife Deyna lived in Vermont during the carving of the 75 ton monument which was dedicated by President Gerald Ford. The work took several years to complete.

In the 1980s he was awarded a Rockefeller Foundation grant for study in Bellagio, Italy.

In 1987, he was commissioned by The Gardens Mall, located in the City of Palm Beach Gardens, Florida, to create a bronze life-size sculptural composition of the Greek Myth huntress Diana.

Wein said that "every good work of art is a good abstract composition" or could at least be represented by one. That the subject, devoid of details and pared down to only what is necessary to convey the "essence" of the composition is what really mattered in an artistic work.

Wein created over 500 sculptures and 300 painting and drawings.

He died in March 1991. Wein was survived by his third wife, Deyna Wein, her two daughters (Gaye and Bambi Breakstone), his son (Jack Yellen) from his first marriage and 4 grandchildren ( Deborah Yellen, Sheldon Yellen and Mark Yellen).
