= Anita Fields =

Native American artist from Oklahoma, U.S. (born 1951)

- Born: Anita Lutrell; 1951 (age 74–75); Hominy, Oklahoma, U.S.
- Citizenship: Osage Nation and U.S.
- Education: Institute of American Indian Arts, Oklahoma State University
- Known for: Earthenware sculpture, ceramics, textile art, Osage ribbonwork
- Spouse: Tom Fields
- Website: nativefieldsart.com

Anita Fields (born 1951) is an Osage/Muscogee Native American ceramic and textile artist based in Oklahoma. She is an enrolled citizen of the Osage Nation.

Fields is recognized internationally for her work in ceramics, often rendering functional items such as purses, moccasins, and dresses in clay. She is also well known for her conceptual museum installations and ribbonwork.

Museums that have collected Fields' work includes the Heard Museum in Phoenix, Arizona; the National Cowboy and Western Heritage Museum in Oklahoma City, Oklahoma; the Museum of Art and Design in New York City, the Museum of the American Indian at the Smithsonian Institution, and Crystal Bridges Museum of American Art in Bentonville, Arkansas.

Her work has been included in exhibitions such as Atlatl's Who Stole the Tepee at the National Museum of the American Indian, Legacy of the Generations: American Indian Women Potters at the National Museum of Women in the Arts, Fluent Generations: The Art of Anita, Tom and Yatika Fields at the Sam Noble Museum, and Hearts of Our People: Native Women Artists (2019–20), a traveling exhibition at Minneapolis Institute of Art, Minneapolis, Minnesota; Frist Art Museum, Nashville, Tennessee; Renwick Gallery, Smithsonian American Art Museum, Washington, DC, and Philbrook Museum of Art, Tulsa, Oklahoma.

In 2019, Fields participated in a Osage Nation Museum exhibition project called "Voices from the Drum" where 19 drums were dispersed to accomplished Osage artists. Each artist created a design to be displayed on the drum. The drums, having significance in Osage culture, were created by hand by Rock Pipestem.

Fields is working at the Tulsa Artist Fellowship in Tulsa, and is involved in a three-year term on the Osage Election Board as an Alternate Member.

== Early life ==
Anita Luttrell was born in Hominy, Oklahoma, on the Osage Nation. She is enrolled in the Osage Nation and is a descendant of the Muscogee Nation. She grew up on her grandfather's allotment until she was around eight years old, when her family moved to Colorado. Fields lived in Colorado until she was 18 years old. Her father was a guide, outfitter, and a welder who supported the family. Fields' grandmother on her mother's side was a seamstress, and taught Fields how to sew when she was a young girl. Fields enjoyed making clothes for her favorite doll and relished in these artistic outlets from an early age.

While in third grade in Colorado, Fields was taught how to make a fresco and a collage. Her teacher at the time was passionate about the arts and influenced Fields' own love for art that would develop through time.

== Education ==
After graduating from Wheat Ridge High School, Fields attended the Institute of American Indian Arts (IAIA) in Santa Fe, New Mexico from 1972 to 1974. She originally went there to paint, but was exposed to many different media such as video and multi-media, clay, and sculpture, which expanded her focus. Fields met her husband, Tom Fields (Muscogee Creek/Cherokee), in Colorado over a holiday. Fields left the institute to raise a family with Tom. Before having children, Fields took classes at community centers and museums, such as the Osage Nation Museum. During this time Fields learned Osage finger weaving and ribbonwork. The Oklahoma Department of Career and Technical Education hired Tom, so the couple moved to Stillwater, Oklahoma. Fields later enrolled at Oklahoma State University and graduated with a bachelor's degree in fine arts. It was after completing her BFA that she made the commitment to become a full time clay artist. "Because I'm able to use clay, and the earth, I have this really strong feeling of how the earth holds the memory of the people who were there," she said.

== Artwork ==
Early in her career, Fields made sculptures, such as little figurines. Fields made an entire series of little clay boxes with smaller clay figures inside of them. During this period, Fields developed a lot of her work through the process of terra sigillata. Anita's work is usually fired in an electric kiln and finished by a postsmoking process with sawdust, straw, or leaves. She often adorns unsmoked sculptures with tiny raku ware additions, such as elk teeth. While many of her works are figurative, the figures represent the spirituality and do not depict anyone in particular. Fields explains, "I want to show the spirituality of us as women, how we fit into family, how we remain strong yet filled with love, and how we overcome all difficulties."

Clothing is a prominent inspiration in Field's clay work. For her, clothing is a symbol of transformation and heritage. Some of her pieces are dresses, standing independent, or of female figures wearing dresses. In line with this theme, Fields created a series of clay parfleches. She was especially interested in the metaphor these parfleches provided of the culture of the times and was fascinated by what we make to take care of ourselves.

Other examples of her work include masks, platters, buckskin dresses, and abstracted figurative work. Her depiction of domestic motifs is intended to honor all women. After witnessing the graffiti work of her son, Fields was inspired to start incorporating distorted messages on her work. For example, in her work "Finding Our Way to the Earth" she includes her grandmother's handwriting as background images. She said her grandmother kept detailed notes on calendars and stenographer notebooks. "My grandmother had really beautiful handwriting," she said.

== Exhibitions ==
Fields' work has been displayed in many museums. A sample of these include:

- Heard Museum
- National Cowboy and Western Heritage Museum
- Museum of Art and Design
- Smithsonian Institution National Museum of the American Indian
- National Museum of Women in the Arts
- Sam Noble Museum, Fluent Generations: The Art of Anita, Tom, & Yatika Fields
- Minneapolis Institute of Art, Minneapolis, MN
- Frist Art Museum, Nashville, TN
- Renwick Gallery, Smithsonian American Art Museum, Washington, D.C.
- Philbrook Museum of Art, Tulsa, OK.
- Hearts of our People: Native Women Artists, (2019), Minneapolis Institute of Art, Minneapolis, Minnesota, United States.

== Critical response ==
American Craft Magazine interviewed Fields in its February/March 2019. Fields' art has been published in several works, including:

- American Craft
- American Style
- Contemporary Ceramics
- First American Art Magazine
- Ms. Magazine
- Native Peoples
- Southwest Art
- Women Artists of the American West
- Encyclopedia of North American Indian

== Awards and honors ==
Fields is a recipient of a 2021 National Heritage Fellowship awarded by the National Endowment for the Arts, which is the United States government's highest honor in the folk and traditional arts. In 2021, she also received the Anonymous Was A Woman Award.
