= Tom Fields (artist) =

Muscogee Creek/Cherokee photographer

- Born: 1951 (age 74–75); Tahlequah, Oklahoma
- Known for: photography
- Spouse: Anita Fields
- Website: nativefieldsart.com

Tom Fields (born 1951) is a Muscogee Creek/Cherokee photographer from Oklahoma. He has worked in both commercial and fine art photography during his career. Fields specializes in full-frame, black-and-white photos, shot as close as possible, of American Indian communities. For Fields, his work provides a "visual definition of what it is like to be Native American in Oklahoma."

== Early life ==
Tom Fields was born in Tahlequah, Oklahoma, in 1951. His Muscogee father was a minister, so the family moved all over eastern Oklahoma and Kansas. His mother was Cherokee. Fields' earliest exposure to photography was in helping his father prepare slides for church services with his father's Instamatic camera. After he graduated from high school, Fields moved to California and became more involved with American Indian youth activities, such as the National Indian Youth Council.

In 1969, Fields was a student at University of California, Los Angeles, for a summer workshop involving graphite drawings. He eventually studied political science at the university. After his time in California, Fields returned to Oklahoma where he became involved at the University of Oklahoma with Indian student programs. In the mid to late 1970s, Fields helped out with a documentation project with the goal of capturing Native ceremonies and events on video and archiving them. After this project, he began to hang around friends associated with the Institute of American Indian Arts (IAIA). During this time, Fields was exposed to printing photographs and was intrigued by the process. After this exposure, he started shooting and printing on his own. Fields and his friends were not a students at IAIA, but were taking part in photography and film projects around the area.

In 1978, Fields enrolled as an art major at Northeastern State University with his focus being in photography. Fields' work at the time was inspired by Life (magazine) photographer, Eugene Smith.

Fields' photographs were the first ever to be accepted to the Indian Annual exhibition at the Philbrook Museum of Art.

== Style ==
Fields' documentary photography is inspired by "the emotional landscapes of Native people." His photographs often display detailed moments of spiritual and/or cultural expression.

== Exhibitions and awards ==
Fields began to exhibit his work in 1979. Some of these places include:

- Institute of American Indian Arts, Santa Fe
- National Museum of the American Indian
- Smithsonian Institution in Washington, D.C.
- Banff Centre in Banff, Alberta, Canada
- New Orleans Museum of Art

In 2011, his work, “Nativescapes: A View from the Interior,” was displayed at the Oklahoma State Capitol Complex in Oklahoma City.

Fluent Generations: The Art of Anita, Tom and Yatika Fields (2018) at the Sam Noble Museum in Norman, Oklahoma, featured work by Tom, his wife, and son. Curator Dan Swan also edited a catalogue for the exhibition.
