= Carl Edgar Myers =

American aeronautical engineer

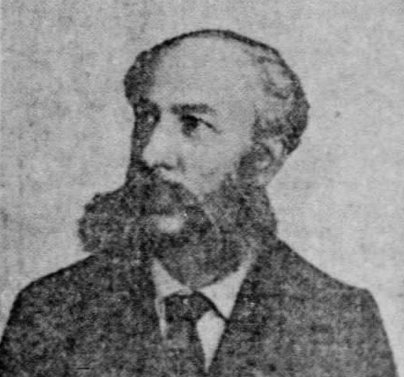
- Myers in 1903
- Born: March 2, 1842; Herkimer, New York, U.S.
- Died: 1925 (aged 82–83)

Carl Edgar Myers (March 2, 1842 – 1925) was an American aeronautical engineer. He was born at March 2, 1842 at Herkimer, New York, to Abram H. and Eliza Ann (Cristman) Myers. At various times in his life, he was employed as carpenter, mechanician, plumber, electrician and chemist, banker, and photographer. After 1878, he focused on aeronautical engineering. He became known as the inventor of new or improved systems for generating gases, and as the constructor of hydrogen balloons and airships, including the aerial velocipede, gas kite, sky-cycle and electrical aerial torpedo. He married Mary Breed Hawley on November 8, 1871.

Myers, after spending two years hiring professional balloonists to test his designs, Myers went up in a balloon himself.

He and his wife had one child, a daughter born in 1881 called Elizabeth Aerial Myers.

With the assistance of his wife, Mary, Myers built two sky-cycles.

He wrote articles for many publications, including his self-published Balloon Bulletin. His last article was published by Scientific American in 1913.

== Publications ==
Myers, Carl E. (1913). "Half a Lifetime with the Hydrogen Balloon". Scientific American.
