= Fort Bull =

Coordinates: 43°13′27″N 75°30′9″W

Fort Bull was located at the Oneida Carry in British North America (now New York, United States) during the French and Indian War.

On October 29, 1755 Governor William Shirley ordered Captain Mark Petrie to take the men under his command and to build a fort on the upper landing of Wood Creek to protect the Oneida Carry. The fort was capable of holding a garrison of sixty to seventy men. The fort was attacked and destroyed by the French on March 27, 1756, in the Battle of Fort Bull.

== History ==
During the eighteenth century, the Oneida Carry was the English name for the portage path between the Mohawk River and Wood Creek. It was primarily used as a fur trade route between the Dutch West India Company and English Traders. Once the French and Indian War broke out the English built two small stockade forts on the Oneida Carry to safeguard supply lines to Oswego. These small forts became Fort Bull and Fort Williams. Two years into the war in March 1756 a French-led attack accompanied by Canadians and Native Americans destroyed Fort Bull and its connecting supply routes. To rebuild their strength on the Carry the British replaced Fort Bull with Fort Wood Creek. In the following Summer of 1756, the Oneida Carry became a large military complex for British troops. Yet, in late August rumors began to spread of weaknesses in the British strongholds on the Carry. Following the Battle of Fort Oswego, and fearing another French invasion, the British Commander on the Carry, General Webb, ordered all Forts and other works on the Carry to be destroyed. The British then retreated to the German Flatts and gave up on the Carry.
