= Fort Stanwix =

Historic place in Rome, New York, United States

- U.S. National Register of Historic Places
- U.S. National Historic Landmark
- U.S. National Monument
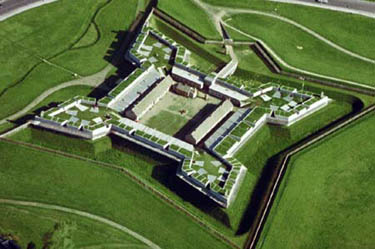
- Aerial view from the north of the reconstruction

- Location within New York Location within the United States
- Interactive map of Fort Stanwix
- Location: 100 North James St. Rome, New York
- Coordinates: 43°12′38″N 75°27′19″W
- Area: 16 acres (6.5 ha)
- Built: 1758; 268 years ago
- Visitation: 77,507 (2025)
- Website: Fort Stanwix National Monument
- NRHP reference No.: 66000057

Significant dates
- Added to NRHP: October 15, 1966
- Designated NHL: November 23, 1962
- Designated NMON: August 21, 1935

Fort Stanwix was a colonial bastion fort in present-day Rome, New York.

It was built during the French and Indian War to guard a strategic portage along the water route from Lake Ontario to the Hudson River known as the Oneida Carry. Construction commenced on August 26, 1758, under the direction of British General John Stanwix, but was not completed until about 1762. Fort Stanwix National Monument, a reconstructed structure built by the National Park Service, now occupies the site.

After American forces captured and rebuilt the fort during the American Revolutionary War, they were besieged in August 1777 by a British army that invaded from Canada via Lake Ontario, hoping to reach the Hudson River. The fort's successful defense contributed to the defeat of a larger British army during the Saratoga campaign.

It was also the site of the 1768 Treaty of Fort Stanwix between Britain and several Native American tribes, as well as of the 1784 Treaty of Fort Stanwix between the tribes and the American government.

Besides the fort reconstruction itself, the national monument includes three short trails that encircle it, one of which follows a portion of the Oneida Carry. The Marinus Willett Collections Management and Education Center preserves the monument's 485,000 artifacts and documents, displays exhibits about Fort Stanwix and the Mohawk Valley, and serves as a regional tourism center.

== History ==
Fort Stanwix was constructed in 1758 to guard a portage, the Oneida Carry, between the main waterway southeastward to the Atlantic seacoast, down the Mohawk and Hudson rivers, and an important interior waterway northwestward to Lake Ontario, down Wood Creek and Oneida Lake to Oswego.

=== Treaty of Fort Stanwix (1768) ===
In 1768, Fort Stanwix was the site of an important treaty conference between the British and the Iroquois, arranged by William Johnson. By the time of this treaty, the fort had become dilapidated and inactive. The purpose of the conference was to renegotiate the boundary line between Native American lands and white settlements set forth in the Proclamation of 1763. The British government hoped a new boundary line might bring an end to the rampant frontier violence, which had become costly and troublesome. Native Americans hoped a new, permanent line might hold back white colonial expansion.

The final treaty was signed on November 5 and extended the earlier proclamation much further west. The Iroquois had effectively ceded Kentucky to the British. However, the tribes who actually used the Kentucky lands, primarily Shawnee, Delaware, and Cherokee, had no role in the negotiations. Rather than secure peace, the Fort Stanwix treaty helped set the stage for the next round of hostilities.

Fort Stanwix was abandoned in 1768 and allowed to go to ruin.

=== Fort Schuyler and the Battle of Oriskany ===
The fort was reoccupied by Colonial troops under the command of Colonel Elias Dayton on July 12, 1776. They began reconstruction and renamed it Fort Schuyler, although many continued to call it Fort Stanwix. Colonel Peter Gansevoort took over command of the fort on May 3, 1777.

On August 3, 1777, the fort was besieged by The King's 8th Regiment of Foot, Loyalists, and Native Americans, under the command of Brigadier General Barry St. Leger, as part of a three-pronged campaign to divide the American colonies. Gansevoort refused the terms of surrender offered by the British, and the siege commenced.

According to local folklore, when the Colonial troops raised the flag over the fort on August 3, 1777, it was the first time that the Flag of the United States was flown in battle. It is more likely that the flag flown at Fort Schuyler was one that consisted only of thirteen stripes, an early version of the Flag of New York, or the Continental Union Flag.

The Battle of Oriskany was fought a few miles to the southeast when an American relief column, led by General Nicholas Herkimer, was ambushed by Tories and their Native American allies. While many of the besiegers were attending to that battle, the defenders of the fort sallied forth and attacked the enemy camp, looting and destroying enemy stores. Demoralized and reduced in strength, the British withdrew when they heard reports of the approach of yet another relief column, led by General Benedict Arnold. The British forces withdrew through Canada and joined Burgoyne's campaign at Fort Ticonderoga.

The British failure to capture the fort and proceed down the Mohawk Valley was a severe setback and helped lead to the defeat of General John Burgoyne at the Battle of Saratoga.

In April 1779, an expedition from Fort Schuyler against the Onondaga people was begun by the Continental Army led by Col. Goose Van Schaick.

The fort burned to the ground on May 13, 1781, and was not rebuilt. It was abandoned and the garrison took up quarters at Fort Herkimer.

=== Treaty of Fort Stanwix (1784) ===
The second Treaty of Fort Stanwix was conducted at the fort between the Americans and the Native Americans in 1784. During the War of 1812 a blockhouse was built on the parade ground. Beginning in 1828 the fortifications were dismantled.

== National monument ==
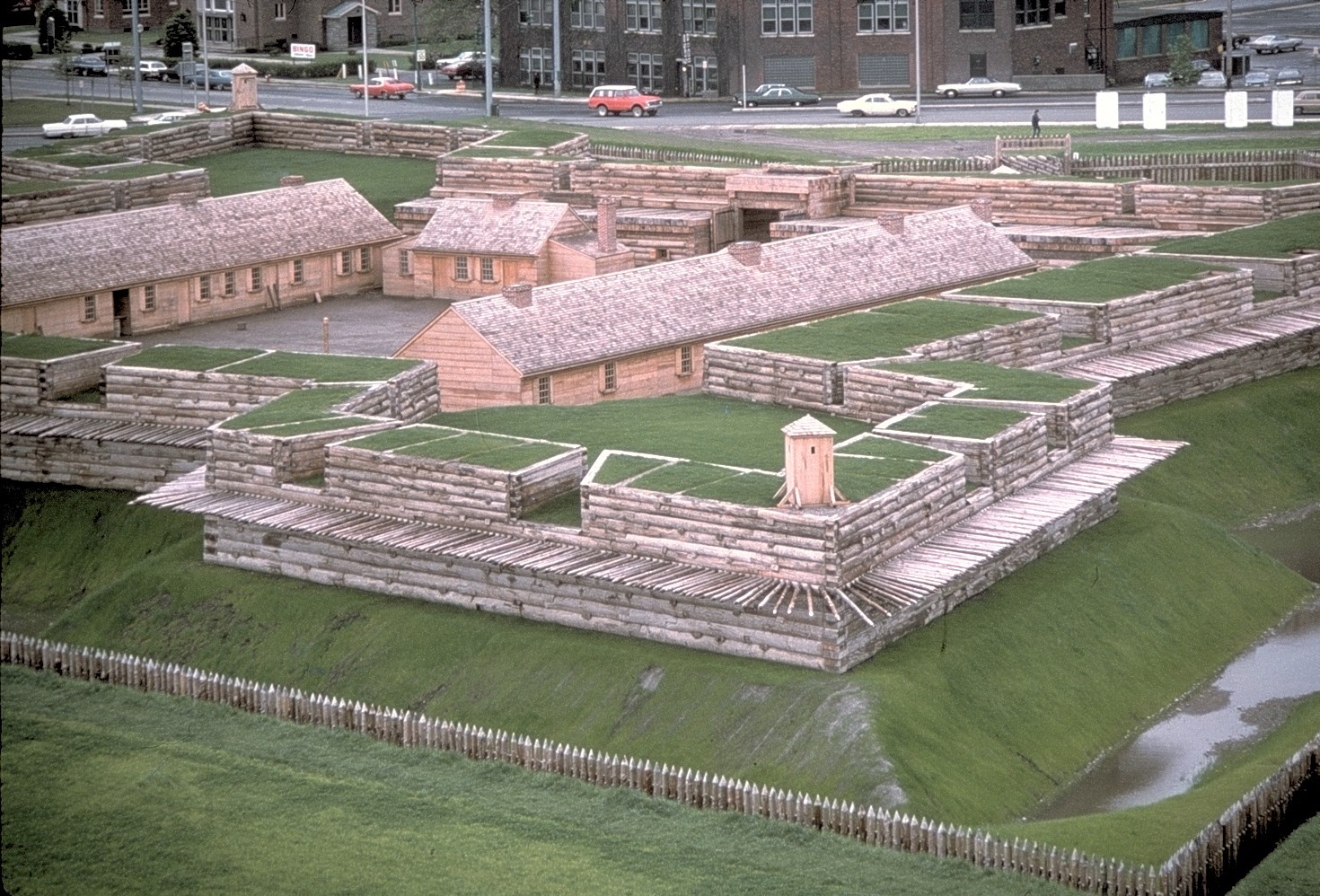
View of the reconstructed Fort Stanwix around 1980

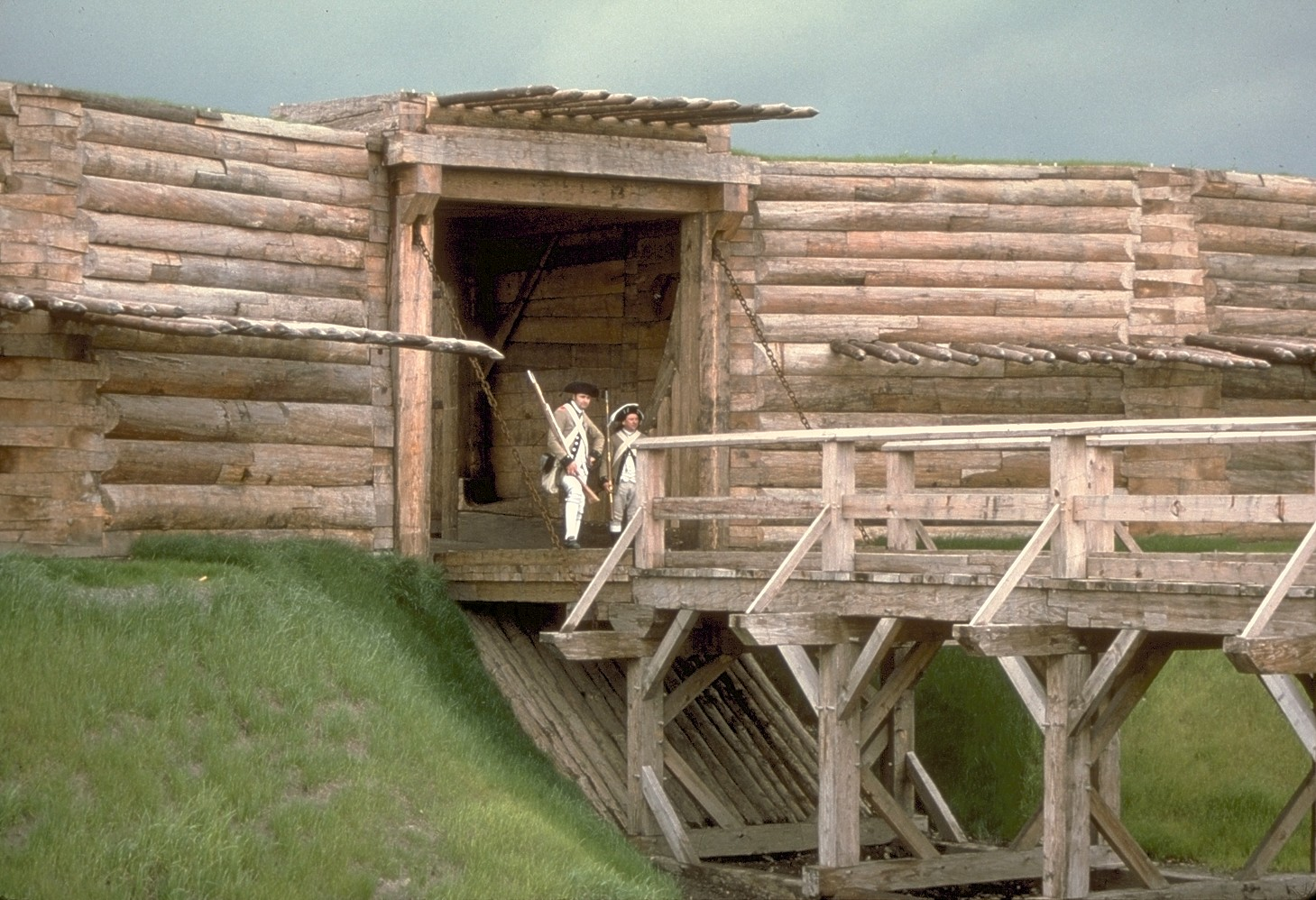
Reconstructed drawbridge and curtain wall

President Franklin D. Roosevelt signed enabling legislation that created the national monument on August 21, 1935; at that time, the land that would ultimately be used for the monument was occupied by the businesses and residences of downtown Rome. During the 1960s, Rome city leaders lobbied for a fort reconstruction as part of an urban renewal program to help revitalize downtown Rome. Under political pressure from Senator Robert F. Kennedy (D-NY), who was seeking political support in upstate New York, the Park Service reluctantly agreed to build a reconstruction of the Revolutionary War-era fort.

The Park Service completed a master plan for Fort Stanwix in 1967, and in 1970, the NPS began a three-year archaeological investigation. Reconstruction of the fort began in 1974, and the partially completed structure was opened to the public in time for the United States Bicentennial celebration in 1976. The current reconstruction—an earth-and-timber-clad, reinforced concrete structure surrounding three freestanding buildings—was completed in 1978.

From 1976 until the mid-1990s, the fort's significance was explained to visitors using first-person interpretation to portray life immediately after the siege (1777–78), emphasizing the American Revolution. More recently, third-person interpretation has extended visitor understanding to the French and Indian War as well as the role played by the fort during the negotiation of a series of treaties with Native Americans. A new visitor center was added in 2005. The monument is currently open year around, operated by the National Park Service.

== See also ==
- List of national monuments of the United States
- Oriskany Battlefield State Historic Site
- Sally Ainse, owner of a deed for the land where Fort Stanwix was located
