= Siege of Fort Stanwix =

Part of the American Revolutionary War

- Part of the American Revolutionary War
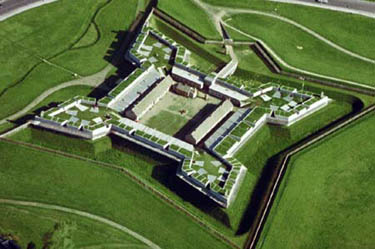
- Aerial view of the reconstructed Fort Stanwix
Date	August 2–22, 1777 (2 weeks and 6 days)
Location	Fort Stanwix, New York 43°12′38″N 75°27′19″W
Result	American victory

Belligerents
(Kingdom of Great Britain) Great Britain; Hesse-Hanau; Mohawk; Seneca	United States; Oneida

Commanders and leaders
(Kingdom of Great Britain) Barry St. Leger; (Kingdom of Great Britain) John Johnson; (Kingdom of Great Britain) John Butler; Joseph Brant; Cornplanter; Sayenqueraghta	(United States) Peter Gansevoort; (United States) Nicholas Herkimer (DOW); (United States) Benedict Arnold; Han Yerry

Strength
750 regulars and provincials; 800 Indigenous	750 regulars (Gansevoort); 800 militia and 50 Oneida (Herkimer); 700 regulars and 100–300 militia (Arnold)

Casualties and losses
British, Hessian, Loyalist; • 5 killed; • 47 wounded or sick; • 41 captured or missing; Indigenous; • 32 killed, captured, or missing; • 34 wounded or sick	American; • 392 killed; • 68 wounded; • 30 captured; • 9 missing

The siege of Fort Stanwix (also known as Fort Schuyler) began on August 2, 1777, and ended on August 22, 1777. Fort Stanwix, at the western end of the Mohawk River Valley, was a primary defense point for the Continental Army against the British and Indigenous forces aligned against them during the American Revolutionary War. The fort was occupied by Continental Army forces from New York and Massachusetts under the command of Colonel Peter Gansevoort. The besieging force was composed of British regulars, Loyalist soldiers, Hessians, and Indigenous warriors, under the command of Brigadier General Barry St. Leger. St. Leger's expedition was a diversion in support of Lieutenant General John Burgoyne's campaign to take control of the Hudson River Valley to the east.

One attempt at relief was thwarted early in the siege when a force of New York militia under Brigadier General Nicholas Herkimer was ambushed on August 6 at the Battle of Oriskany by a large detachment of St. Leger's forces. While the battle did not involve the fort's garrison, some of its occupants sortied and plundered the nearly empty Indigenous and Loyalist camps, which was a blow to the morale of St. Leger's Indigenous allies. The siege was finally broken when American reinforcements under the command of Major General Benedict Arnold approached, and Arnold used a ruse to convince the besiegers that he had a much larger force. This misinformation, combined with the departure of many of the Indigenous warriors, led St. Leger to abandon the effort and withdraw.

St. Leger's failure to advance on Albany contributed to Burgoyne's surrender following the Battles of Saratoga in October 1777. Although St. Leger reached Fort Ticonderoga with some of his forces in late September, he was too late to aid Burgoyne.

== Background ==
Fort Stanwix occupied a strategic western portage known as the Oneida Carrying Place (site of modern Rome, New York) between the Mohawk River, which flowed southeast to the Hudson River, and Wood Creek, whose waters ultimately led to Lake Ontario. Built by the British in 1758 during the French and Indian War on the only dry ground in the area, the fort had fallen into disrepair. When the American Revolutionary War widened in 1776 to include the frontier areas between New York and the Province of Quebec, the site again became strategically important.

British Colonial Secretary Lord Germain and General John Burgoyne developed a plan for gaining control of the Hudson River valley that included an expedition that King George III described as a "diversion on the Mohawk River". In March 1777 Germain issued orders assigning the expedition to Lieutenant Colonel Barry St. Leger, an experienced frontier fighter who had served in the French and Indian War.

== Forces assemble ==
In April 1777, Continental Army Major General Philip Schuyler ordered the 3rd New York Regiment under the command of Colonel Peter Gansevoort to occupy and rehabilitate Fort Stanwix as a defense against British and Indigenous incursions from Quebec. Arriving in May, they immediately began working on the fort's defenses. Although officially renamed Fort Schuyler, it was still widely known by its original name. Warnings from the Oneida that the British were planning an expedition were confirmed by mid-July, spurring the pace of the work. In early July, Gansevoort reported on the state of affairs to Schuyler, noting that provisions and ammunition were in short supply. Schuyler ordered additional supplies sent to the fort on July 8. Later that month the 3rd New York were joined by a 150 man detachment of the 9th Massachusetts Regiment.

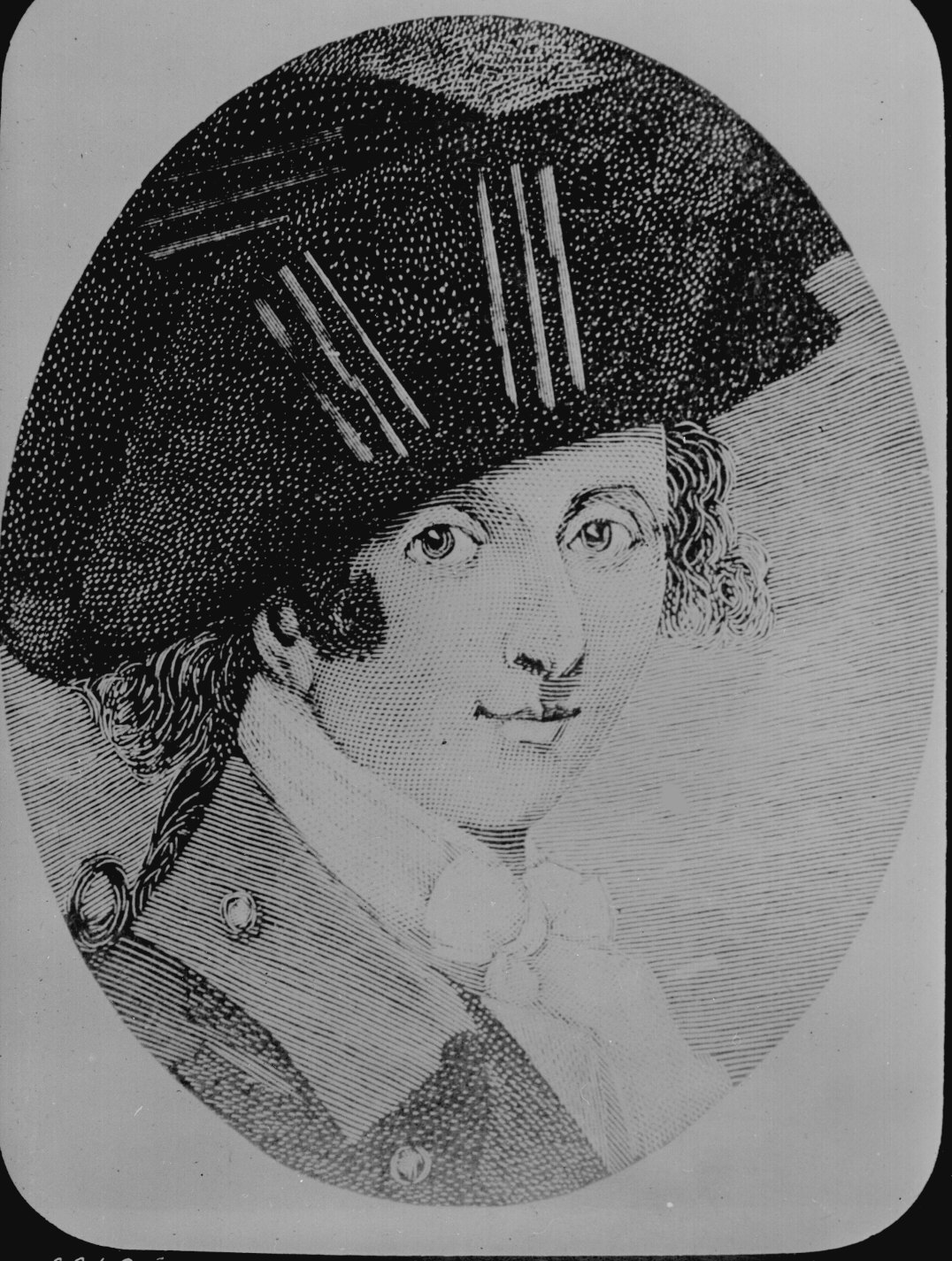
18th-century engraving of Barry St. Leger

St. Leger, who was brevetted a brigadier general for the expedition, assembled a diverse force consisting of about 240 British regulars from the 8th Regiment of Foot, 34th Regiment of Foot and the Royal Artillery, 250 Loyalists from the King's Royal Regiment of New York (also known as the Royal Yorkers), 90 jäger from Hesse-Hanau, and 50 Canadien laborers. His artillery consisted of two six-pound pieces, two three-pounders and four coehorn mortars. He expected these to be adequate for the taking of a dilapidated fort with about 60 defenders, which was the latest intelligence he had when the expedition left Lachine, near Montreal, on June 26.

St. Leger first learned that the Americans had occupied Fort Stanwix in force when prisoners captured from its garrison were brought to him on the St. Lawrence River. He learned from the prisoners that the fort had been repaired and was "garrisoned by upwards of 600 men" and that "the rebels are expecting us, and are acquainted with our strength and route". Daniel Claus, a British Indian Department superintendent accompanying the expedition, convinced St. Leger to proceed to Oswego on Lake Ontario rather than ascend the Salmon River as originally planned. They arrived at Oswego on July 25, where about 100 Indian Department rangers from Fort Niagara led by deputy superintendent John Butler joined the expedition. Also at Oswego were Joseph Brant with his Loyalist volunteers and a large contingent of Mohawk warriors.

In total about 800 Indigenous warriors joined St. Leger's expedition. Many were Seneca led by Cornplanter and Sayenqueraghta, but there were also warriors from the Cayuga, the Onondaga, the Mississaugas, and from the Upper Great Lakes area.

The expedition ascended the Oswego and Oneida rivers to Oneida Lake, then followed the north shore of the lake to Wood Creek. Wood Creek had been blocked by the Stanwix defenders just a week earlier by felling trees across the creek which slowed St. Leger's forces and forced then to rebuild an old military road in order to reach the fort.

Shortly after leaving Oswego, a report reached St. Leger that more supplies for the fort were en route via a convoy of bateaux on the Mohawk River. St. Leger immediately dispatched Lieutenant Henry Bird and 30 men from the 8th Regiment to intercept those supplies. Bird was later joined by Brant with his volunteers and the Mohawk.

Bird and Brant's arrival at the lower landing near the fort early on August 2 was too late. The supply convoy, which was accompanied by 100 men from the 9th Massachusetts Regiment, had arrived and been unloaded. Bird and Brant were able to capture the convoy's bateaux captain, however, the supplies and Massachusetts soldiers safely reached the fort.

== Siege begins ==
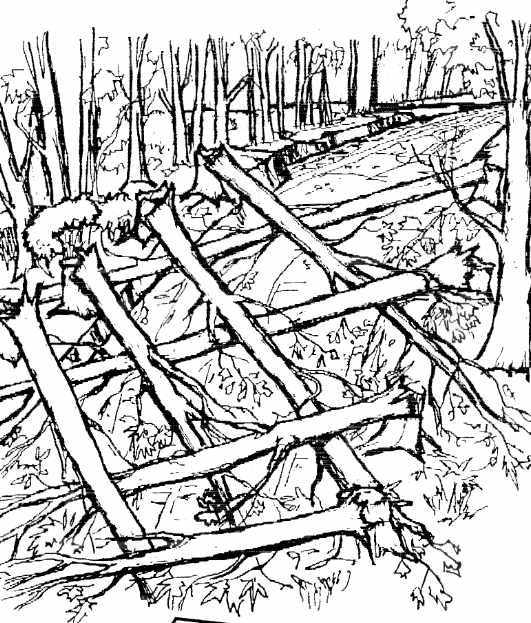
A road blocked by a "giant abatis" such as delayed St. Leger's artillery

St. Leger arrived at Fort Stanwix on the evening of August 2 with the regulars from the 8th and 34th regiments, the jägers, and a company of the Royal Yorkers. The Canadiens, many of the Indian Department rangers, and the rest of the Royal Yorkers were tasked with clearing Wood Creek and the Oneida Carry, which the Americans had blocked with fallen trees.

St. Leger's artillery and stores were held up by the same tactic used to slow down Burgoyne's army after the surrender of Fort Ticonderoga. Earlier, Gansevoort had his men systematically fell trees across the Oneida Carry, creating abatises, and St. Leger needed to clear the path before his artillery could proceed. This work took several days and, as a result, the arrival of the artillery was delayed.

On the afternoon of August 3, St. Leger paraded his troops, including the Mohawk in their war paint, in view of the fort. He then sent Indian Department Captain Gilbert Tice under a flag of truce with a proclamation authored by Major General Burgoyne. Gansevoort declined to respond, however, Tice was able to gather valuable intelligence about the fort's defenses.

Construction of breastworks began the following day. Jägers and Indigenous snipers began to harass the fort's defenders, killing one and wounding several.

On August 5, the main body of Seneca and Cayuga warriors arrived. The same day, Brant received word from his sister, Molly, who was living at Canajoharie, that an American relief column was marching up the Mohawk Valley. Upon receiving the news from Brant, St. Leger immediately dispatched Lieutenant Colonel Sir John Johnson with a company of his Royal Yorkers, Brant with his volunteers, Butler with a detachment of rangers, a detachment of jägers, and several hundred Indigenous warriors to block the American advance.

== Oriskany ==
The Tryon County Committee of Safety received news of St. Leger's movements on July 30 and began to assemble reinforcements. On August 4, about 800 men from the Tryon County militia were mustered at Fort Dayton (near modern Herkimer, New York) by Brigadier General Nicholas Herkimer, the committee chairman. By late the next day Herkimer's column had arrived within 10 miles (16 km) of Fort Stanwix where they were joined by about 60 Oneida led by Han Yerry Tewahangarahken.

In planning their ambush, Johnson and Butler deferred to Brant, Cornplanter and Sayenqueraghta. On August 6, at the bloody confrontation near Oriskany Creek, the Tryon militia suffered catastrophic casualties, including Herkimer, who received a serious wound to the leg. In a battle that lasted several hours, roughly half of Herkimer's men were killed or captured. St. Leger's Indigenous allies also suffered significant casualties.

Late in the afternoon St. Leger's detachment withdrew back towards Fort Stanwix. Herkimer (who eventually died of his wounds) and the surviving militia also retreated rather than continue their advance.

The confrontation came at a cost to St. Leger. Gansevoort's besieged troops took advantage of the absence of a sizable part of St. Leger's force to make a sortie, in which Gansevoort's second-in-command, Lieutenant Colonel Marinus Willett, led 250 men out and looted the nearly empty Indigenous and Royal Yorkers camps of "several wagon-loads of spoils", including Johnson's personal papers and orderly book, a British flag, four camp colours, and a letter the British had intercepted from Gansevoort's fiancée. The story about recovering actual wagon loads of materials is probably untrue. It likely dates to a memoir by Marinus Willett written late in his life. No contemporaneous accounts of the sortie, including Willett's earlier journals, mention the need for wagons.

When the Indigenous warriors and Royal Yorkers returned from Oriskany they arrived at camps that had been stripped of much, including blankets, kettles and personal belongings. Combined with the fact that the battle at Oriskany had resulted in many Indigenous casualties, this greatly upset the Seneca and Cayuga. They had been told that the regulars and the Loyalists, who had thus far fought relatively little, would do most of the fighting. This breach of trust damaged relations between St. Leger and his Indigenous allies, and became instrumental in the eventual failure of the siege.

== Siege continues ==
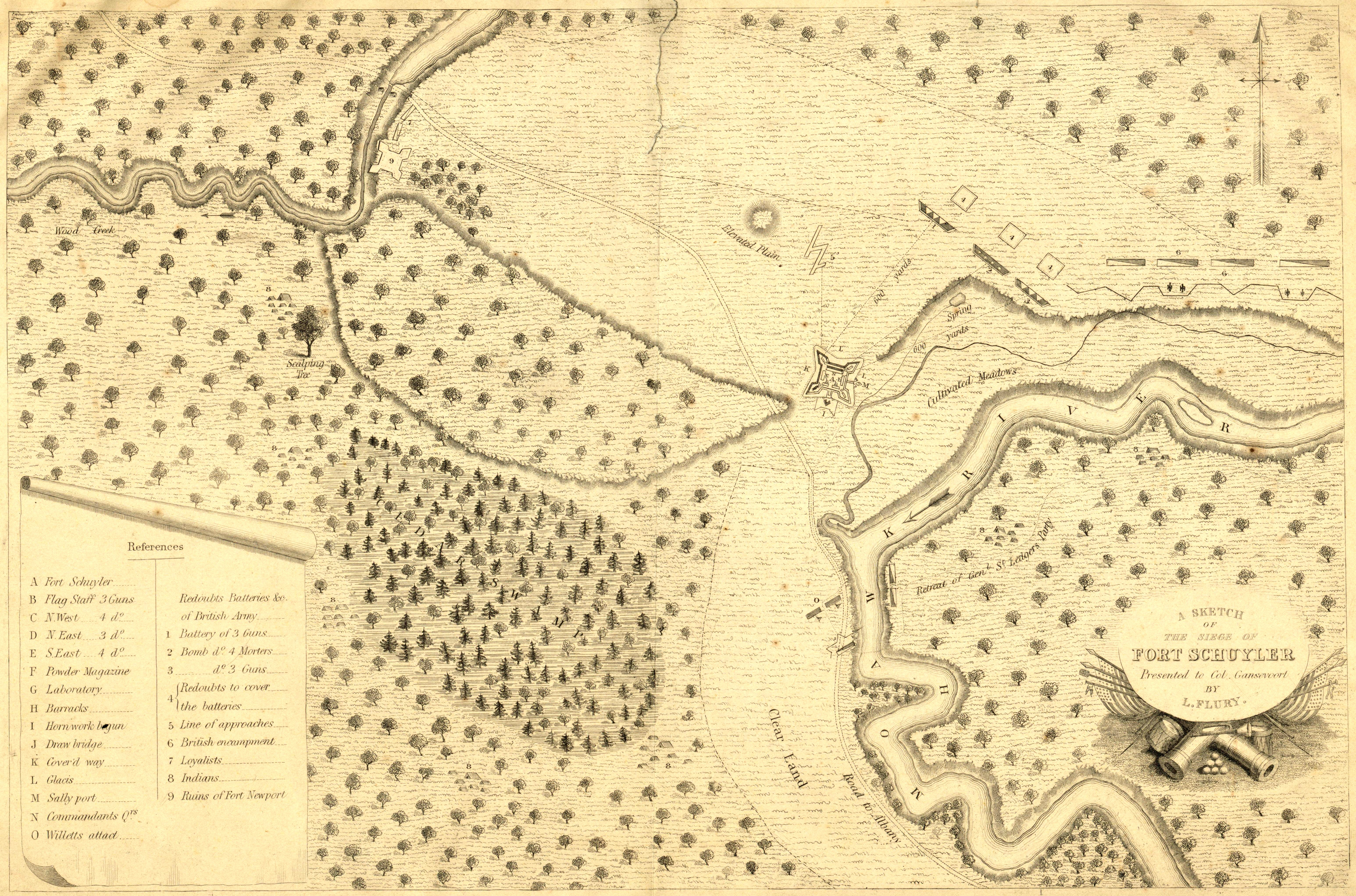
A 1777 map depicting the troop placements in the siege

Siege operations began in earnest following the arrival of the British artillery. The regulars, the six-pounders and the coehorns were positioned on a low rise north of the fort, while most of St. Leger's Indigenous allies and the Royal Yorkers were positioned to the south with the three-pounders.

St. Leger took advantage of the victory at Oriskany to once again demand the fort's capitulation. Following a brief barrage from the coehorns, St. Leger sent three officers including Butler with the terms. Threats were made that the Indigenous warriors would massacre the garrison and destroy the Mohawk valley communities from which the garrison was drawn if the fort did not surrender. In an eloquent refusal, Gansevoort responded, "By your uniform you are British officers. Therefore, let me tell you that the message you have brought is a degrading one for a British officer to send and by no means reputable for a British officer to carry."

Taking advantage of the brief truce, Gansevoort sent Willett and another officer out through the British lines to notify Schuyler of their situation. After making their way through the swampy ground near the fort they continued down the Mohawk Valley, eventually meeting a relief column under the command of Major General Benedict Arnold.

Sniping and periodic shelling of the fort resumed on August 9. Work also began on a siege trench that could allow St. Leger's forces to breach the walls of the fort.

On August 13, Johnson, Claus and Butler convinced St. Leger that a delegation be sent under a flag of truce to convince the inhabitants of the Mohawk Valley to abandon their support for the rebellion. John Butler's son Walter Butler of the 8th Regiment was chosen to lead the 18-man delegation. On August 15, the delegation was taken prisoner at Shoemaker Tavern in German Flats.

== Siege relief ==
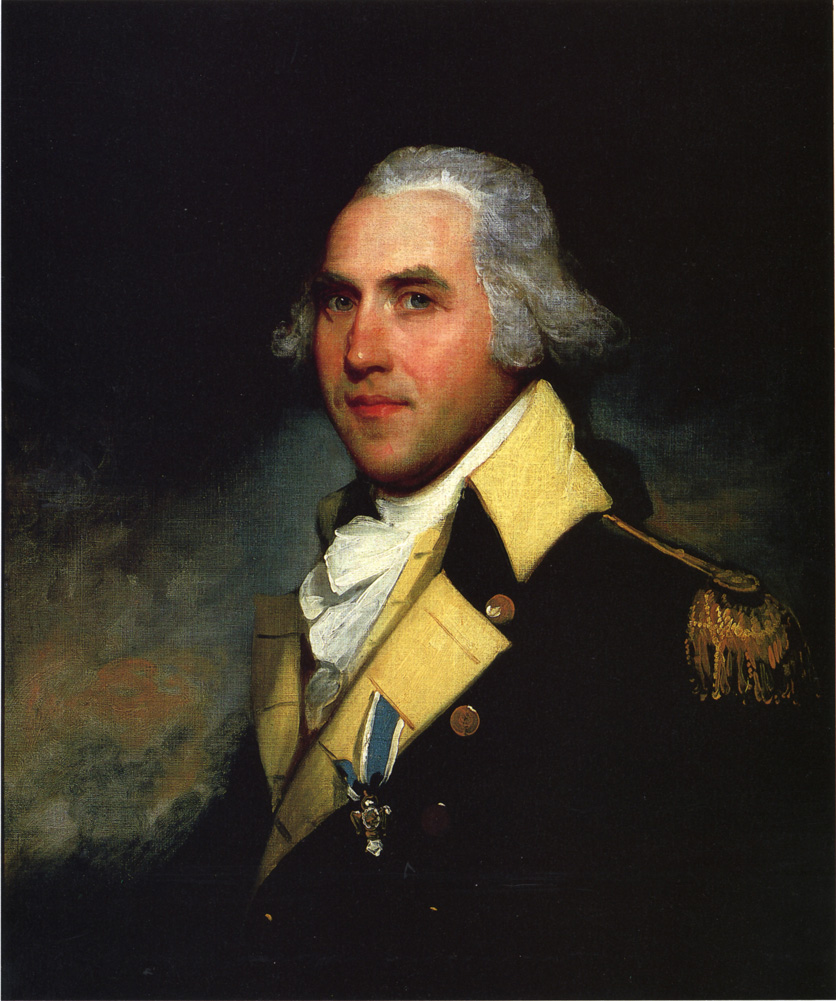
Portrait of Peter Gansevoort by Gilbert Stuart, 1794

Schuyler received early reports of the action at Oriskany on August 8, and dispatched Ebenezer Learned's 4th Massachusetts Regiment to relieve the besieged fort the next day. On August 12, even before Willett could reach him, Schuyler held a war council to decide how to deal with the combined threats of St. Leger and Burgoyne, whose large army was at Fort Edward on the Hudson River. Amid concerns that the withdrawal from Ticonderoga by Major General Arthur St. Clair would be repeated at Stanwix, the council decided, with near unanimity, not to send a relief column to Fort Stanwix. In opposition to the council, Schuyler insisted on a relief expedition, which Arnold offered to lead. In addition to Schuyler's actions, Major General Israel Putnam, based in Peekskill, New York, on August 14 dispatched two regiments (the 1st Canadian and the 2nd New York), which were already on guard duty in the Mohawk River valley. These two units were still en route when the siege was lifted, and turned back.

By August 20, Arnold, Willett and 700 Continental Army regulars had arrived at Fort Dayton. In an attempt to enlarge his force, Arnold tried to recruit the Tryon County militia in another attempt against St. Leger, but raised only about 100 men. He then decided to wait, hoping that the Oneidas and Tuscaroras could be convinced to join the effort, or that a request to Schuyler for another 1,000 men would be fulfilled. However, news reached him that the siege had reached a critical stage, and that action was necessary. Gansevoort reported that St. Leger's siege trench was approaching striking distance of one of the fort's bastions.

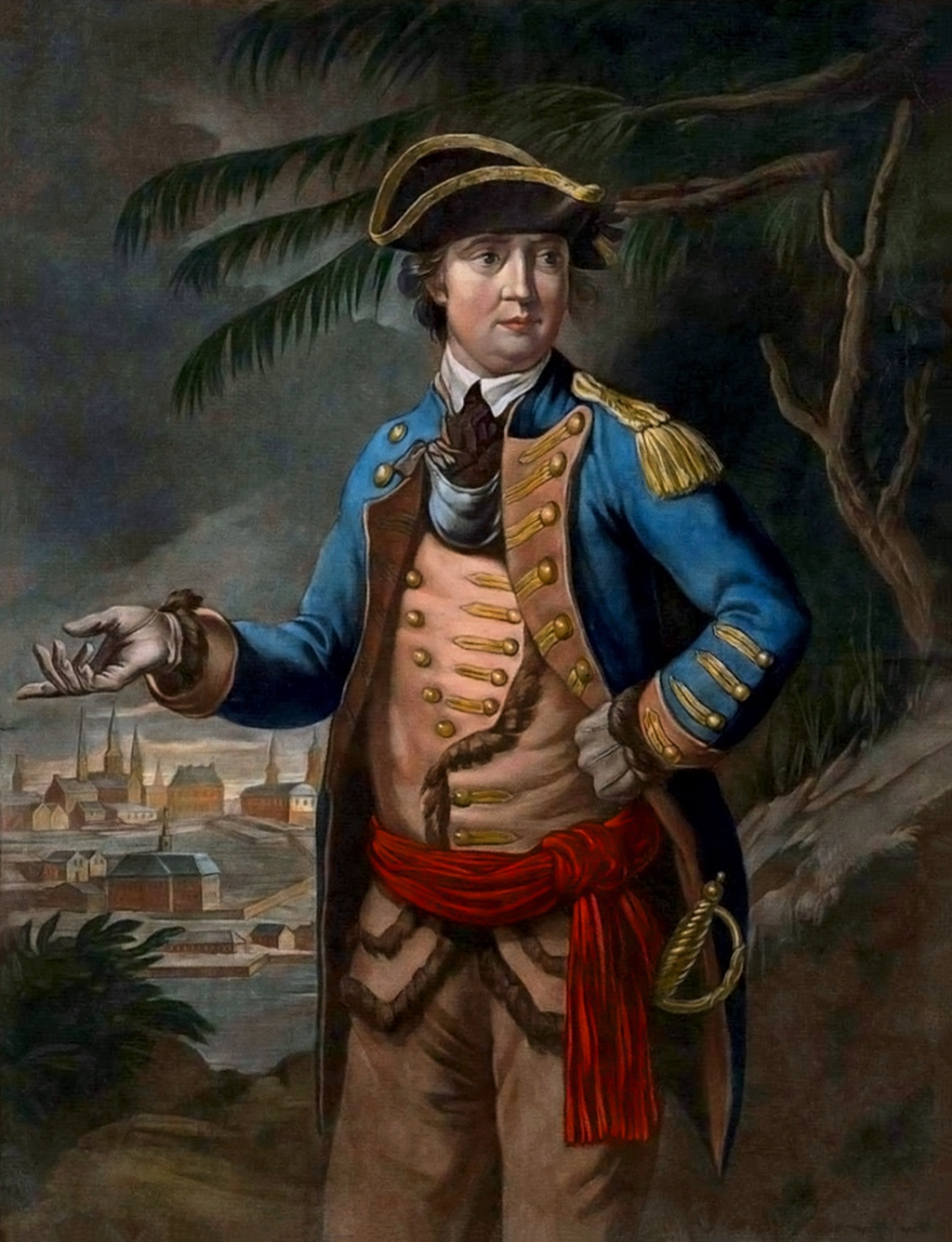
A 1776 mezzotint of Benedict Arnold

Uncomfortable with the number of troops available to him, Arnold opted for a deception to sow trouble in the British camp. The delegation captured at Shoemaker Tavern was held prisoner at Fort Dayton and among them was Hon Yost Schuyler, a member of the Royal Yorkers who grew up with many of the Mohawks attacking Fort Stanwix. Arnold persuaded Hon Yost to return to Fort Stanwix and spread rumors that large numbers of Americans, under the command of the "Dark Eagle", were about to descend on St. Leger's camp. Hon Yost's good conduct was assured by holding his brother hostage.

Arnold's stratagem met with some success. St. Leger recorded on August 21 that "Arnold was advancing, by rapid and forced marches, with 3,000 men", even though Arnold was still at Fort Dayton on that day. When St. Leger held a council, about 200 of his Indigenous allies had already abandoned the camp, and in the council those that remained, unhappy with siege warfare and the loss of their possessions, threatened to leave. On August 22, St. Leger broke camp and began the trek back to Oswego, leaving behind a sizable amount of equipment. A number of men from St. Leger's party deserted or were captured by the fort's garrison, including Hon Yost.

== Aftermath ==
Arnold, whose force was augmented by the arrival of friendly Oneida, advanced about 10 miles (16 km) toward Fort Stanwix on August 23 when a messenger from Gansevoort notified him of St. Leger's departure. Pushing on, they reached the fort that evening. Early the next day, Arnold detached 500 men to pursue St. Leger, whose column was also being taunted and harassed by his formerly supportive Indigenous allies. An advance party reached the shores of Oneida Lake in heavy rain just as the last of St. Leger's boats were departing. Leaving a garrison at the fort, with smaller outposts along the Mohawk, Arnold then hurried back with about 1,200 men to rejoin the main army.

While still on Oneida Lake, St. Leger learned from an Indigenous scout of the true state of Arnold's force. On August 27, St. Leger wrote to Burgoyne from Oswego that he intended to join him by traveling via Lake Champlain. He reached Fort Ticonderoga on September 29, too late to assist Burgoyne.

Burgoyne blamed the failure of his campaign in part on St. Leger's failure to penetrate the Mohawk valley, and the lack of sufficient Loyalist support. He believed that a well-placed Loyalist uprising in upstate New York would have diverted enough American resources that either his advance or St. Leger's would have succeeded. He was also hopeful that St. Leger's arrival at Ticonderoga would be sufficient to assist in his retreat. However, he was already surrounded by the time St. Leger arrived at Ticonderoga, and surrendered after the Battle of Bemis Heights (second Saratoga). In an analysis after the surrender, Burgoyne noted that the failure of General William Howe to support him made it possible for Washington to divert resources from the area around New York City to assist both in the relief of Stanwix and at Saratoga.

Fort Stanwix itself saw little action after the siege, although it was a dangerous and unpopular posting because of regular harassment by Loyalists and hostile Indigenous warriors. In the spring of 1779 the Continental Army used the fort as a staging ground for the destruction of Onondaga Castle. In 1780, the garrison was blockaded for several days by a large force of Indigenous warriors led by Joseph Brant. Finally, in the spring of 1781, when flood and fire (most likely arson) destroyed most of the fort, the Americans evacuated the post.

== Legacy ==
Fort Stanwix was eventually destroyed in the 19th century. The site was designated a U.S. National Monument in 1935, although the land itself was then occupied by private businesses and residences in downtown Rome, New York. In 1961 the site was designated a National Historic Landmark, and in 1966 it was added to the National Register of Historic Places. The fort was reconstructed in the 1970s by the National Park Service, creating the current Fort Stanwix National Monument.

The first official US flag was flown during battle on August 3, 1777, at Fort Schuyler. The Continental Congress adopted the following resolution on June 14, 1777: "Resolved, that the flag of the United States be thirteen stripes, alternate red and white; that the union be thirteen stars, white, on a blue field, representing a new constellation." There was a delay in displaying this flag. The resolution was not signed by the secretary of the Congress until September 3, though it was previously printed in the newspapers. Massachusetts reinforcements to Fort Schuyler brought news of the adoption by Congress of the official flag. Soldiers cut up their shirts to make the white stripes; scarlet material was secured from red flannel petticoats of officers' wives, while material for the blue union was secured from Captain Abraham Swartwout's blue cloth coat. A voucher shows that Congress paid him for the coat.

== See also ==
- Oriskany Battlefield State Historic Site
