= Oneida Carry =

- Portage
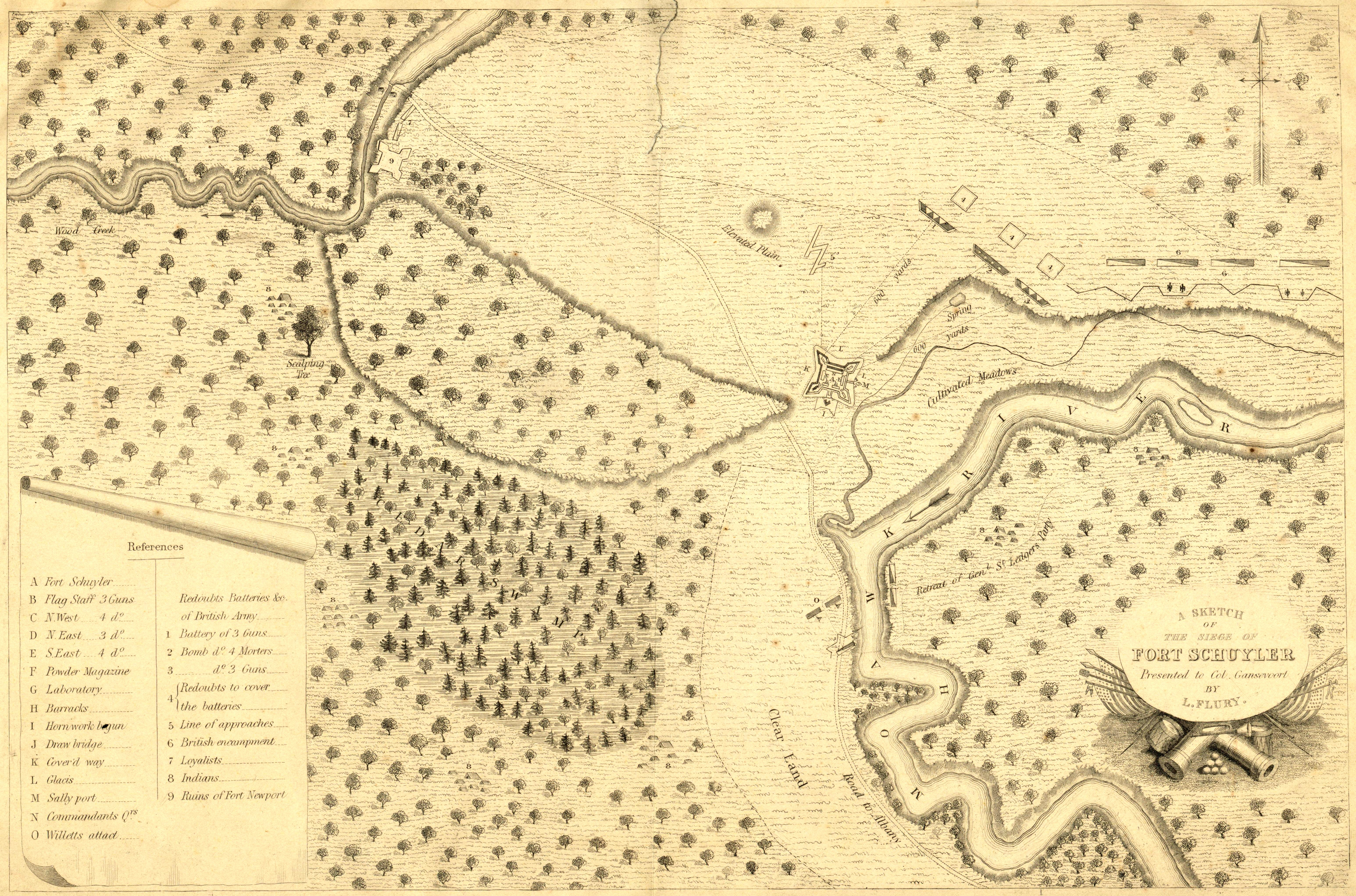
- Map Depicting the Siege of Fort Stanwix and the Oneida Carry
- Nickname: Deo-Wain-Sta or "The Great Carrying Place"
- Location within the state of New York
- Coordinates: 43°13′N 75°28′W
- Country: United States
- State: New York
- County: Oneida
- City: City of Rome
- Elevation: 456 ft (139 m)

The Oneida Carry was an important link in the main 18th century trade route between the Atlantic seaboard of North America and interior of the continent. From Schenectady, near Albany, New York on the Hudson River, cargo would be carried upstream along the Mohawk River using boats known as bateaux. At the location at modern-day Rome, New York, the cargo and boats would be portaged one to four miles overland to Wood Creek. This portage, which the Haudenosaunee called De-o-Wain-Sta, was known as the Oneida Carry or The Great Carrying Place in English, and as Trow Plat in Dutch. After relaunching into Wood Creek (called Kah-ne-go-dick by the Haudenosaunee), the bateaux would navigate downstream to Oneida Lake, the Oswego River, and ultimately Lake Ontario at Oswego. Lake Ontario was the gateway to all the Great Lakes stretching another thousand miles inland.

The only other significant waterway connecting the Atlantic Ocean to the continental interior was the Saint Lawrence River, which flows northeast out of Lake Ontario to Montreal and Quebec City. Thus for nearly a hundred years movement of military goods, trade goods, and other supplies into and out of the continental interior required control over the Oneida Carry. The Carry was strategically important in the colonial wars between Great Britain and France, in the American Revolution, and in the War of 1812 between Great Britain and the United States, and the city of Rome, New York, was founded there in 1796. Its military importance declined with the completion of the Erie Canal in 1825, after which it became just one of many "ports".

== Early development and the French and Indian War ==
The Mohawk Valley, running east and west, cuts a natural pathway between the Catskill Mountains to the south and the Adirondack Mountains to the north

Interest in improving transportation across the Oneida Carry began as early as 1702 when native Americans petitioned Governor Cornbury to have improvements made to allow easier passage of boats. At this time the Oneida Carry was nothing more than a path between the two bodies of water. Although important to trade it wasn't until the beginning of the French and Indian War in 1754 that the Oneida Carry was finally improved with fortifications, supplies, and dams.

Following the failure of British campaign plans in 1755, a chain of forts along the Mohawk River and up to Lake Ontario were garrisoned during the winter of 1755–1756 to protect the route from a French Invasion and provide a staging area for the invasion of New France. The largest garrison was left at Fort Oswego, at the end of the chain, which depended on the others for its supplies. The two forts occupying either end of the Oneida Carry were a key element of this supply chain. Fort Williams, on the Mohawk, was the larger of the two, while Fort Bull, on Wood Creek, was little more than a palisade surrounding storehouses. In March 1756 this palisade, holding a large amount of supplies for Fort Oswego, would be the scene of the first battle, known to history, to take place on the Oneida Carry. The Battle of Fort Bull lasted only one day, but saw the entire fortification, and the supplies within, destroyed when its powder magazine exploded.

Starting in May 1756 the British refortified the Oneida Carry by adding Fort Craven, Fort Newport, and Fort Wood Creek. However, these forts would only remain until August 1756, when they were destroyed by the British themselves in anticipation of a massive attack by the French Army and Marines after the capture of Fort Oswego. Direct control of the Oneida Carry by the British would not be re-established until two years later with the construction of Fort Stanwix in August 1758.

== American Revolution ==
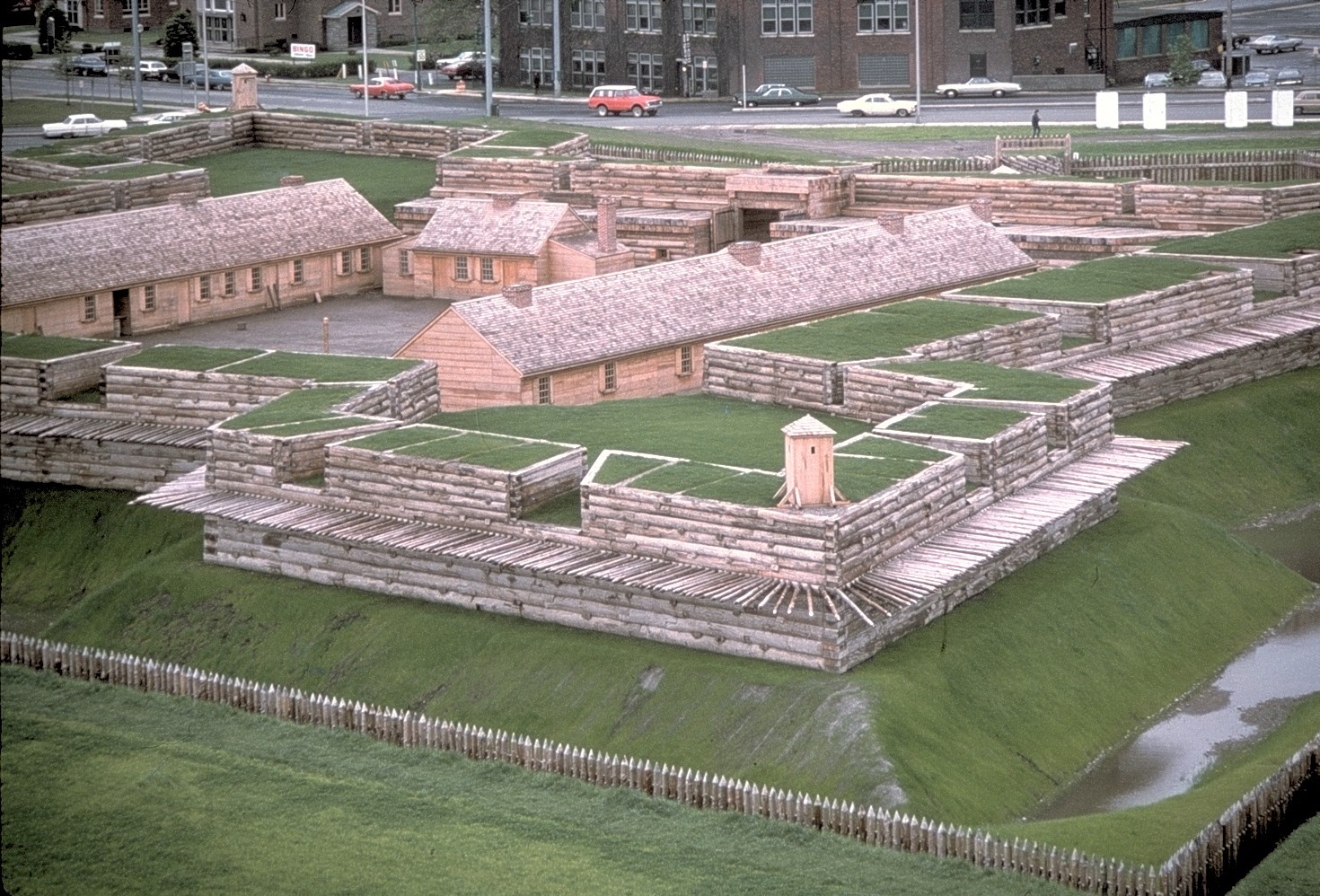
The Walls of Fort Stanwix

Between the end of the French and Indian War and the beginning of the American Revolution the Oneida Carry transformed from a place of war to a place of peace. After Pontiac's Rebellion the British slowly abandoned Fort Stanwix; its believed the last Half Pay Officer left the Fort in June 1774 when Governor William Tryon declared the fort "dismantled". During the inter-war period the carry also became home to the Roof Family- who would establish a tavern, continued to be utilized by merchants to move trade goods into the interior of the continent, and in 1768 saw the signing of the Treaty of Fort Stanwix.

However, during the American Revolutionary War the Oneida Carry once again became a battle ground. With Patriot Forces occupying the carry in August 1776 the Army only had a year to reconstruct Fort Stanwix before the British arrived and laid siege to Fort Stanwix (August 2, 1777 to August 22, 1777). After the successful defense of Fort Stanwix the Oneida Carry saw little military action. In the spring of 1779, as a part of the Sullivan Expedition of 1779, the American Army used the fort as a staging ground for the destruction of Onondaga Castle. In 1780 the garrison was attacked by a large force of Natives led by Joseph Brant forcing a three-day standoff between the Patriot Troops in the well-defended Fort Stanwix and the poorly defended Loyalist Natives. In general the most military action seen by the garrison was the occasional harassment by bands of Loyalist Raiding Parties moving into the Mohawk Valley. Which is not to downplay the many lives lost by those soldiers who were unexpectedly attacked, but to re-enforce the idea that garrison duty on the carry became extremely boring. Finally, in the spring of 1781, when flood and fire (most likely arson) destroyed most of the fort, the American Troops evacuated the post; only to return in 1784 to sign the Second Treaty of Fort Stanwix, ending the American Revolution with those Native Americans who sided with the British.

== 19th century and beyond ==
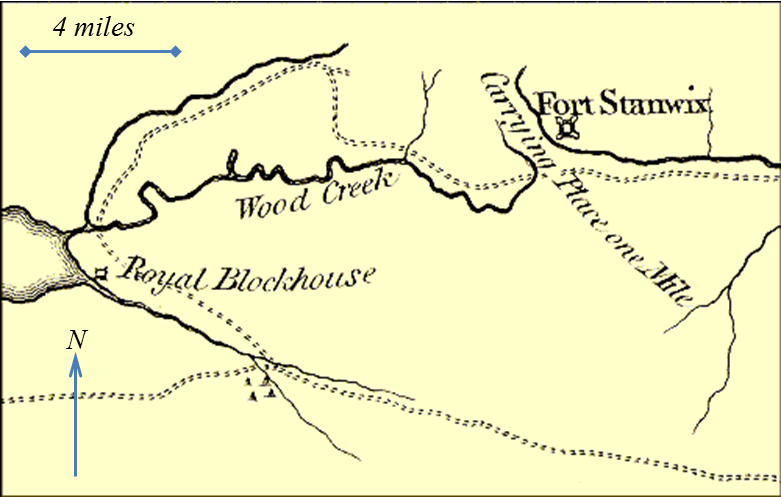
The carry as depicted on Thomas Kitchin's map of 1772

After the war the Oneida Carry continued to be of economic importance. Established in 1792 the Western Inland Lock Navigation Company constructed a canal between the Mohawk River and Wood Creek. With this canal boats no longer had to be removed from the River and carried over the portage. These canals would have continued use until 1817 when the Erie Canal began construction within the new City of Rome.

The carry also saw a continuation of its military importance throughout the 1800s and up to the 21st Century. Built in 1813 and used until 1873, the Rome Arsenal was a three-acre fortification complex which included barracks, arsenal, magazine, workshops, and other buildings, built to support American forces waging the War of 1812, Mexican–American War, and the American Civil War. This post actually replaced an early armory, constructed and utilized in the late 1790s which was located on the site of, the then demolished, Fort Stanwix.

Starting on 3 April 1941, the War Department began looking for an area to construct an Air Depot in central New York and thus the Oneida Carry would once again become an important part of the Nations Defense. Opened in February 1942 Griffiss Air Force Base would become home to the Rome Labs, the 416th Air Expeditionary Group and Strategic Air Command. Currently the now closed Air Force Base is the home for the Northeast Air Defense Sector facilities which provides detection and air defense for the entire eastern half of the United States.

The city of Rome, with a population of 33,725 at the 2010 census and the second largest city in the State of New York by area (75.7 square miles), now encompasses most of what was once the Oneida Carry. Rome Free Academy, the high school for the city of Rome, refers to their yearbook as the "De-O-Wain-Sta" in honor of the Oneida Carry.
