= Battle of Fort Oswego =

French and Indian War battle

- Part of the French and Indian War
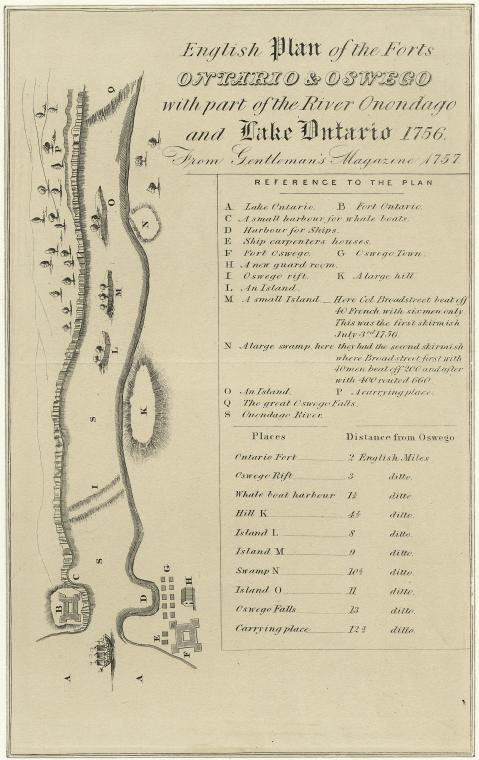
Date	August 10–14, 1756
Location	Fort Oswego, present-day Oswego, New York 43°27′42″N 76°30′51″W
Result	French victory

Belligerents
France: (New France) Colony of Canada	Great Britain

Commanders and leaders
Louis-Joseph de Montcalm	James Mercer †; John Littlehales (surrendered)

Strength
3,000 French army, troupes de la marine, colonial militia, and Indians	1,100 British army

Casualties and losses
30 dead or wounded	80–150; 1,700 captured (including noncombatants)

The Battle of Fort Oswego was one in a series of early French victories in the North American theatre of the Seven Years' War won in spite of New France's military vulnerability. During the week of August 10, 1756, a force of regulars and Canadian militia under General Montcalm captured and occupied the British fortifications at Fort Oswego, located at the site of present-day Oswego, New York.

In addition to 1,700 prisoners, Montcalm's force seized the fort's 121 cannons. The fall of Fort Oswego effectively interrupted the British presence on Lake Ontario and removed it as a threat to the nearby French-controlled Fort Frontenac. The battle was notable for demonstrating that traditional European siege tactics were viable in North America when applied properly in the right circumstances and terrain.

== Background ==
Following the beginning of open conflict between French and British colonists in 1754 with the Battle of Jumonville Glen, the governments of Britain and France both sent regular army troops to North America to further contest the disputed territories of the Ohio Country and other border areas, including the frontier between the French province of Canada and the British province of New York, an area in present-day Upstate New York that was then largely controlled by the Iroquois nations. Part of the British plans for 1755 included an expedition to take Fort Niagara at the western end of Lake Ontario. Under the direction of William Shirley, the governor of the Province of Massachusetts Bay, the original Fort Oswego was reinforced, and two additional forts, Fort George and Fort Ontario, were built in 1755. The planned expedition to Fort Niagara never took place due to logistical difficulties, and the fortifications around Oswego were manned during the winter of 1755–56.

The French in 1755 had the only large naval vessels on Lake Ontario, and moved freely about the lake, between Fort Niagara in the west and Fort Frontenac at the head of the Saint Lawrence River. In March 1756 they launched a winter attack on Fort Bull on Wood Creek. Fort Bull was a key depot on the supply line for the Oswego forts, which was the waterway leading up the Mohawk River and crossing over to the Oswego River watershed. In the successful attack, they destroyed many provisions intended for the Oswego garrison, and effectively ruined Shirley's plan to attempt the expedition against Fort Niagara in 1756. Following orders of the Governor of New France, Pierre François de Rigaud, Marquis de Vaudreuil-Cavagnal, in May 1756 French and Indian raiding parties under the command of Louis Coulon de Villiers began harassing the Oswego garrison from a camp on Henderson Bay (south of present-day Sackett's Harbor, New York).

General Louis-Joseph de Montcalm arrived in Montreal in May 1756 to lead the French army troops. He and Governor Vaudreuil took an immediate dislike to one another, and disagreed over issues of command. Concerned over the massing of British troops at the southern end of Lake George, Montcalm first went to Fort Carillon on Lake Champlain to see to its defenses. Vaudreuil meanwhile began massing troops at Fort Frontenac for a potential assault on Oswego. Following favorable reports from the raiding parties, Montcalm and Vaudreuil decided to make the attempt.

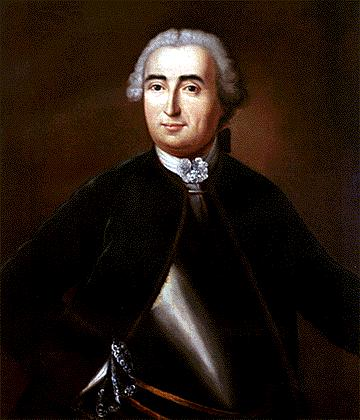
General Louis-Joseph de Montcalm

Governor Shirley received word in March 1756 that he was to be replaced by John Campbell, 4th Earl of Loudoun. Loudoun's second in command, General James Abercrombie, only arrived in Albany in late June, and Shirley spent the intervening time shoring up the supply line to Oswego in anticipation of leading an expedition against the French forts on Lake Ontario. In June William Johnson traveled to the Iroquois headquarters at Onondaga, and successfully negotiated support for the British side with the Iroquois, Shawnee, and Delaware, forces that Shirley also hoped to use for his expedition. Shirley also hired 2,000 armed "battoemen", men experienced in sailing and shipbuilding. Under the command of John Bradstreet, these men successfully resupplied the forts at Oswego in July, although they were attacked by a French raiding party on their way back, suffering 60 to 70 casualties.

When Loudoun arrived in Albany in late July, he immediately cancelled Shirley's plans for an Oswego-based expedition.

=== Defenses at Oswego ===
The complex of defenses at Oswego consisted of three separate forts. On the east side of the Oswego River lay Fort Ontario, a log fortification which was constructed in 1755, was sited on a rise overlooking the mouth of the river. It was garrisoned by 370 troops of the 51st Regiment of Foot (Cape Breton Regiment), and was in fairly good repair. Fort Oswego was on the west side of the river, and had a central structure of stone and clay surrounded by earthworks to the south and west, but fully exposed to Fort Ontario, across the river. A recently constructed Fort George (called "Fort Rascal" by soldiers of the 50th Regiment of Foot (American Provincials), which garrisoned Fort Oswego) consisted of an incomplete wooden palisade fort that lacked even loopholes through which defenders could fire, and was occupied by 150 New Jersey militiamen. The latter two forts did not have very much shelter for the occupying garrison, and there were only a few cannons for the entire complex of defenses.

Significant elements of the 50th Foot and 51st Foot, which were under the overall command of Colonel James Mercer of the 51st Foot, had overwintered there, and suffered significantly due to the shortage of supplies, especially food. Many men died during the winter from diseases such as scurvy, and there had been serious discussion of abandoning the position for want of supplies. While the garrison nominally approached 2,000 men in size, less than 1,200 men were fit for duty.

=== French approach ===
Montcalm left Carillon on July 16 under the command of the Chevalier de Levis, reaching Montreal four days later. Two days later he left for Fort Frontenac, where French troops were gathering along with a large company of Indians. French forces included the battalions of La Sarre, Guyenne, and Béarn, troupes de la marine, and colonial militia, while Indians, numbering about 250, came from all over the territories of New France. The total size of the force was reckoned to be 3,000 men. The governor's brother, François-Pierre de Rigaud, led an advance force of 700 to meet with Villiers' force at Sackett Harbor before the main force set out on August 4. Crossing at night to what is now called Wolfe Island, the vanguard of the main body spent the day there before crossing at night to Sackett's Harbor. By August 8 the entire force was assembled there, and set out the next day for Oswego.

On August 9, troops under Rigaud and Villiers marched overland toward Oswego, while Montcalm and the remaining force moved close to the shore in bateaux, landing about 2 miles (3.2 km) east of Fort Ontario early on August 10. Their stealth in movement was successful, and the British did not discover them until a small patrol boat spotted them the next morning. Larger boats sent by the British were driven away by the French field artillery.

== Battle ==
Montcalm's engineer went to survey the British defenses, accompanied by other officers and party of Native Allies. Montcalm asked Pierre Pouchot to continue with the work of determining how to besiege the British positions. On the night of August 11–12 the French opened siege trenches and began working toward Fort Ontario. The fort's defenders exchanged cannon and gunfire with the French colonists and Indians until late in the day on August 13, at which point, under orders from Mercer, they abandoned the fort even before the siege trenches had reached their goal.

The British garrison marching out of the fort following their surrender

Immediately capitalizing on this, Montcalm occupied the fort and began the construction of batteries on the western edge of the height, where they could reach Fort Oswego's exposed east side. Moving with all speed, the French had nine working cannon established by the morning of August 14. When these opened fire on the exposed stonework of Fort Oswego, the walls crumbled under the onslaught. The garrison, whose cannon were all pointed away from the river (not expecting enemy fire to come from that direction), eventually turned their guns around, and the French fire was returned to some effect. However, Montcalm had ordered Rigaud to lead some men across the river upstream from the fortifications, and these men, who made an unopposed crossing under somewhat difficult conditions, appeared on the edge of the clearing outside Fort Oswego about the same time that Colonel Mercer was struck and killed by a French shell. After a short council Lieutenant Colonel John Littlehales, who took over command from Mercer, raised the white flag.

== Aftermath ==
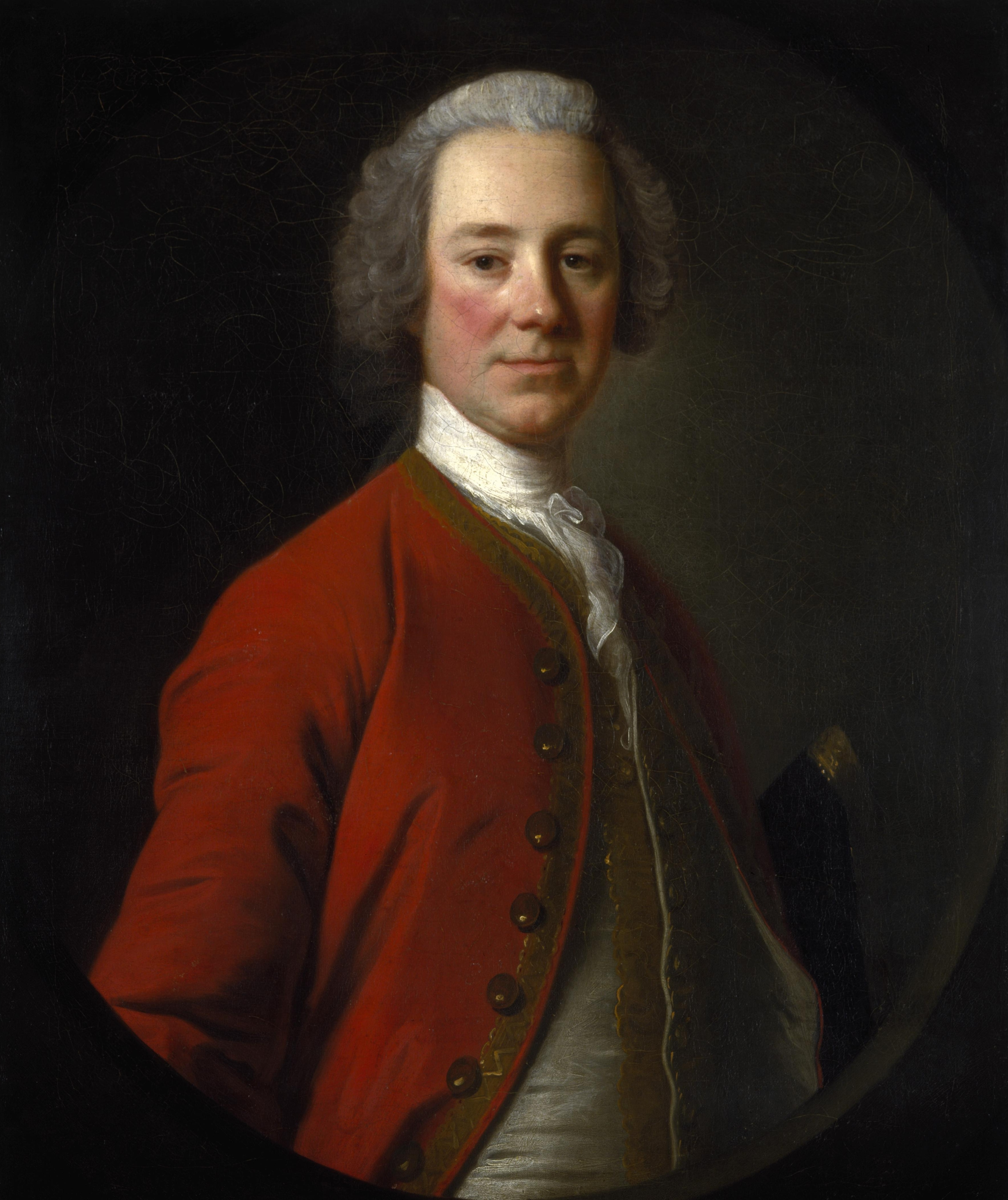
John Campbell, 4th Earl of Loudoun

The British surrendered about 1,700 people, including laborers, shipbuilders, women and children. Montcalm refused to grant the defeated army the honours of war, as he felt that Littlehales had failed to earn them by not putting up more of a fight. When the fort was opened to the Canadian militia and Indians, they rushed in and began plundering the fort, opening the barrels of rum and getting drunk on the contents.

Amid the confusion some of the British tried to escape, and were tomahawked and killed by drunken French or Indians. Colonel Littlehales was seized by a group of Abenakis and badly beaten because "he was a coward and had behaved ill." General Montcalm, shocked by the behavior, was eventually able to prevent further killings, although he claimed it would "cost the King eight or ten thousand livres in presents." He then ordered the destruction of all the supplies the French did not take, as well as the boats under construction, after which the entire company, including the prisoners, traveled to Montreal.

On August 12, Loudoun finally dispatched reinforcements from the 44th Regiment of Foot and Bradstreet's battoemen toward Oswego. When these troops reached the Oneida Carry they learned that Oswego had fallen; after destroying the fortifications there, they retreated to German Flatts, where Loudoun ordered them to stay to prevent further French advances. Loudoun spent significant effort over the following months to pin the blame for the loss on William Shirley. He was cleared of all formal charges in an inquiry, but numerous irregularities were highlighted. Shirley's political connections in London enabled him to acquire other desirable posts later in his career.

The 50th Foot and 51st Foot were completely destroyed as a result of the British surrender and instead of being reconstituted were both disbanded in December 1756. Oswego was effectively abandoned until 1758, when the British reoccupied the area, and Bradstreet led an expedition that captured and destroyed Fort Frontenac. It was used again in 1759 as a departure point for a successful expedition against Fort Niagara, and in 1760 by Jeffery Amherst's army as it moved toward Montreal.

== Bibliography ==
- Anderson, Fred (2001). Crucible of War: The Seven years' War and the Fate of Empire in British North America 1754-1766. Vintage Books. ISBN 0375706364.
- Lucas, Charles Prestwood (1901). History of Canada: part1, New France. Clarendon Press.
- Nester, William (2000). The first global war: Britain, France, and the fate of North America, 1756-1775. Greenwood Publishing Group. ISBN 978-0-275-96771-0.
- Parkman, Francis (1897). Montcalm and Wolfe, Volume 1. Little, Brown, and company. p. 410. "montcalm oswego."
