= Frenchman Island =

Island in Oneida Lake in the U.S. state of New York

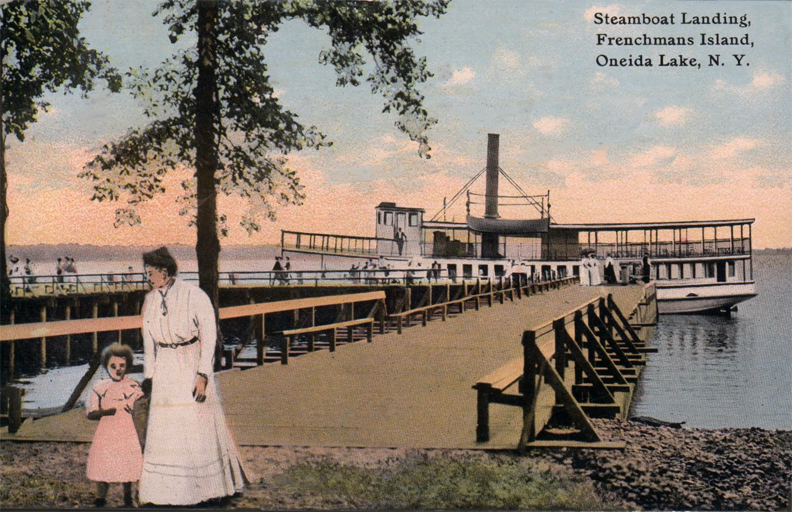
- Postcard showing Frenchman Island's steamboat landing in 1910.

- Location within New York

Geography
- Location: Oneida Lake
- Coordinates: 43°13′06″N 76°02′59″W
- Area: 26 acres (11 ha)
- Highest elevation: 384 ft (117 m)

Administration
- United States
- State: New York
- County: Oswego
- Town: Constantia

Frenchman Island (also known as Frenchman's Island) is a 26-acre (11 ha) island located in Oneida Lake in Oswego County, New York, United States. It was known historically as "Seven Mile Island" during the American Revolution and by the Onondaga people as Kah-wha-nah-kee.

Though it was once home to a popular resort, the island is today uninhabited and largely undeveloped, with the exception of an abandoned lighthouse and dock on the south side of the island. The island is open to the public for recreational use, however it can only be reached by boat.

== Origin of name ==
Frenchman Island derives its name from a legend describing the island's first colonial inhabitants. The story varies between accounts, but generally tells of a French man and a wealthy French woman who eloped to the Americas in defiance of the woman's father. They built a home upon the island in the late 1700s where they remained for seven years, having three children during that time. Visitors were surprised to find a well-apportioned home upon the island, which was at that time deep in a largely unsettled wilderness. Eventually, the father reconciled with his daughter, and the family was allowed to return to France.

Alexis de Tocqueville visited the island in 1831, retracing the story of the Frenchman in Joachim Heinrich Campe's Voyage au lac Onéida (1803), but found only scanty remains of the house.

== Frenchman Island Lighthouse ==
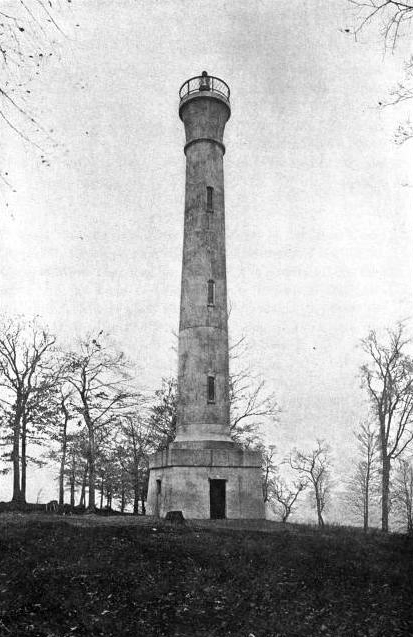
View of the Frenchman Island Lighthouse shortly after its completion in 1917.

The island hosts one of the three lighthouses used to guide navigation on Oneida Lake. The lighthouses were built in 1917 as part of the New York State Barge Canal, which uses Oneida Lake as part of its water route from the Hudson River to Lake Erie. The Frenchman Island Lighthouse is still in operation today and is managed by the New York State Canal Corporation. While the lighthouse was completed in August 1917, it may not have been first lit until 1918. Today, the tower's 1,500 candlepower occulting white light is powered by commercial electricity, although it was gas-powered for several years after its initial completion.

The tower was originally constructed to be 85 feet (26 m) tall, and an additional 20 feet (6.1 m) was added to the tower in 1949. It was constructed atop an 18-foot (5.5 m) rise on the island, making the current total focal height of the lighthouse 123 feet (37 m) above lake level. Light from the tower is visible from up to 20 miles (32 km) away.

== Public use ==
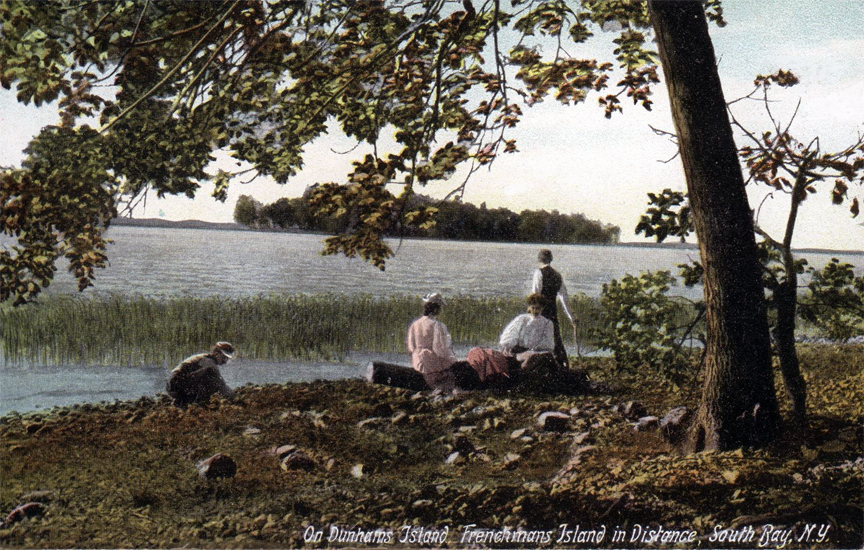
Picnicking on Dunhams Island with Frenchman Island in distance, c. 1910.

The island has historically been a popular location for sightseeing and picnicking. In the late 1800s and early 1900s, the island featured a small resort with a two-story inn and a bowling alley. Trains from Syracuse would deliver passengers to steamboats that made regular trips the island, where visitors would find "boating, sailing, fishing, bathing, tennis, croquet, base-ball and good music."

In the latter part of the 20th century, the island was managed by the New York State Office of Parks, Recreation and Historic Preservation as Frenchman Island State Park, though it was largely undeveloped with little remaining to show from its days as a resort. Due to persistent vandalism, the park was closed for many years before re-opening in 2008. Jurisdiction of the island was transferred to the New York State Department of Environmental Conservation in 2011 with plans for them to manage the island as a Wildlife Management Area. The island became part of the Three Mile Bay Wildlife Management Area.

== See also ==
- List of islands of New York
