= Wood Creek =

River in Central New York State

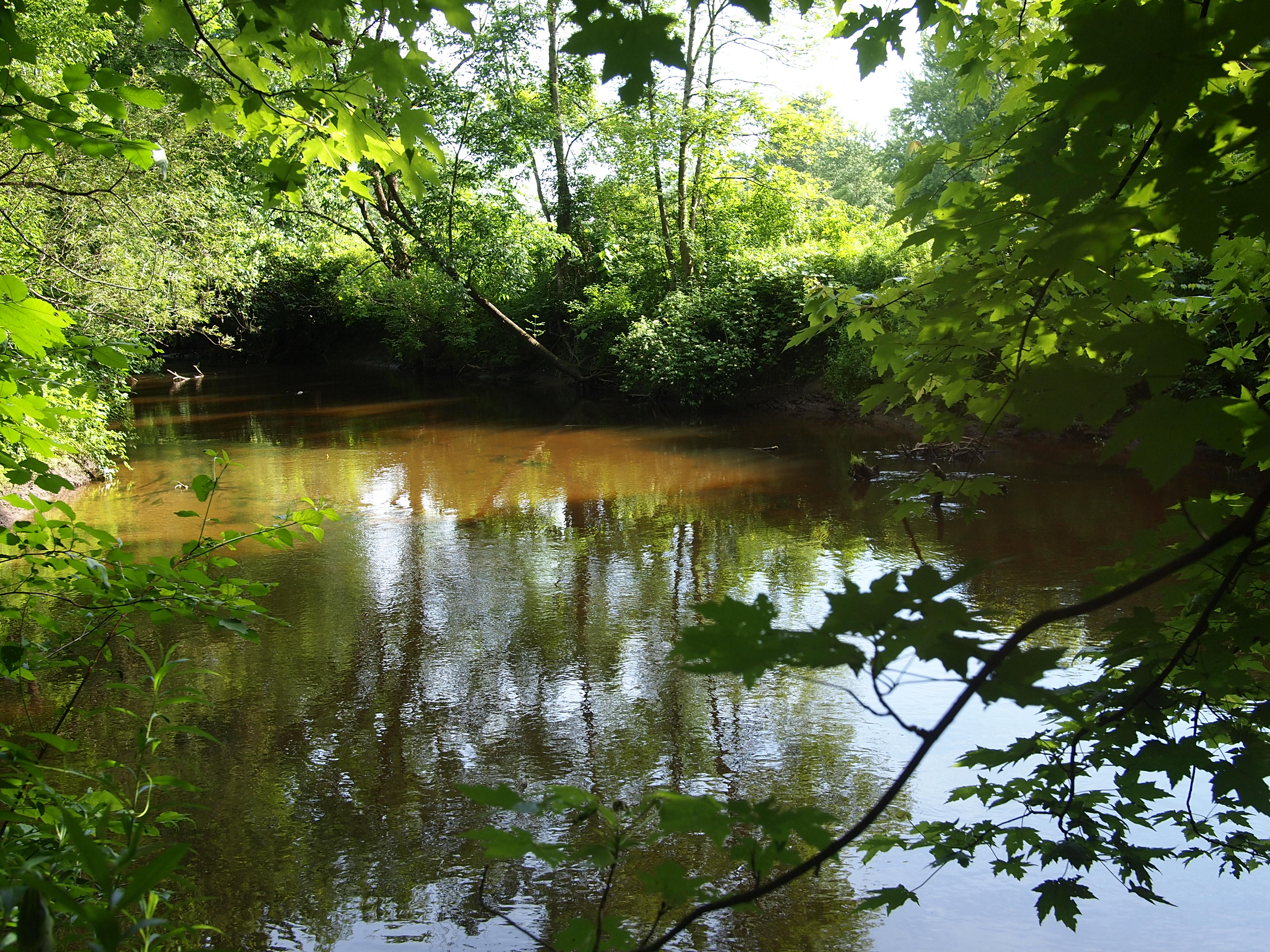
- Looking upstream in June. Until 1820, canoes, batteaux, and 60-foot Durham boats would have passed many times each day.

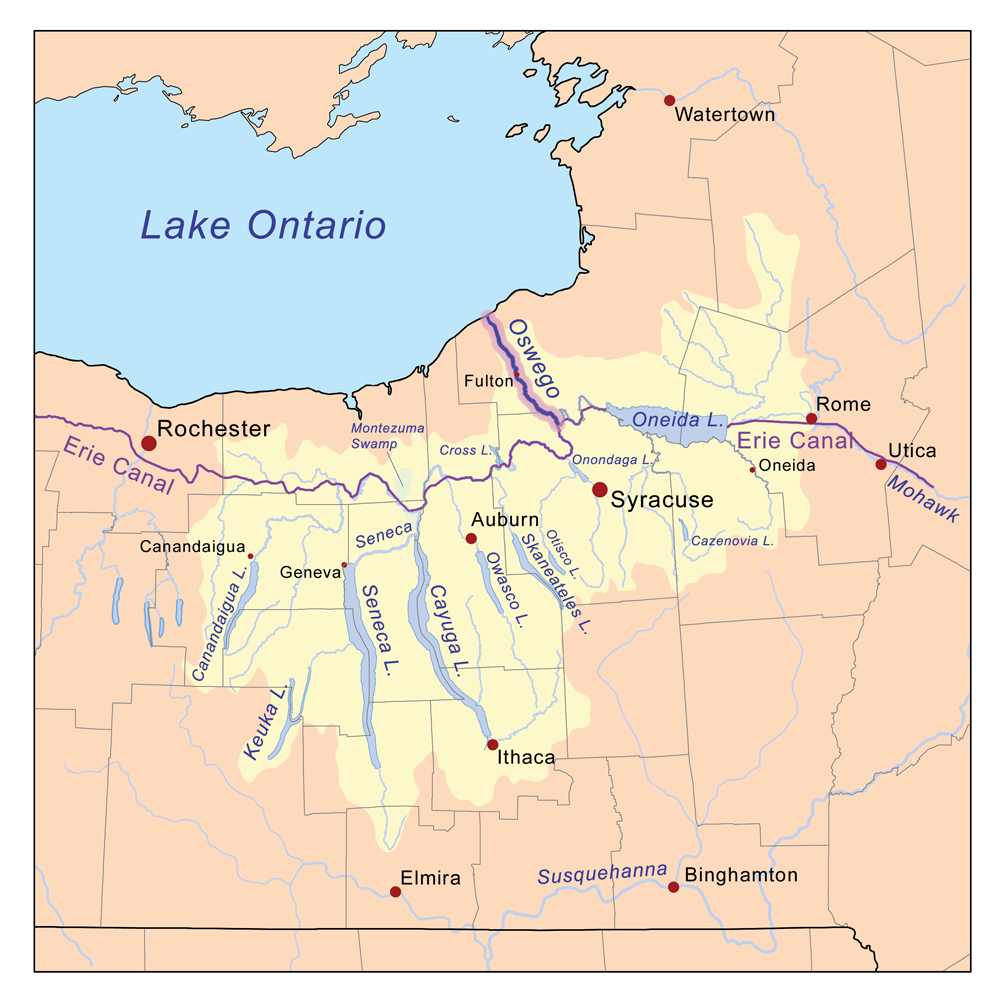
- Midway along Wood Creek. The lighter colored area indicates the Oswego River watershed; Wood Creek's source is at the edge of this watershed.
- Native name: Ka-ne-go-dick

Location
- Country: United States
- State: New York
- Region: Oneida County, New York

Physical characteristics
- Source: Delta Reservoir (since 1916)
  - coordinates: 43°16′55″N 75°27′04″W
- Mouth: Oneida Lake
  - location: Sylvan Beach
  - coordinates: 43°12′12″N 75°41′35″W

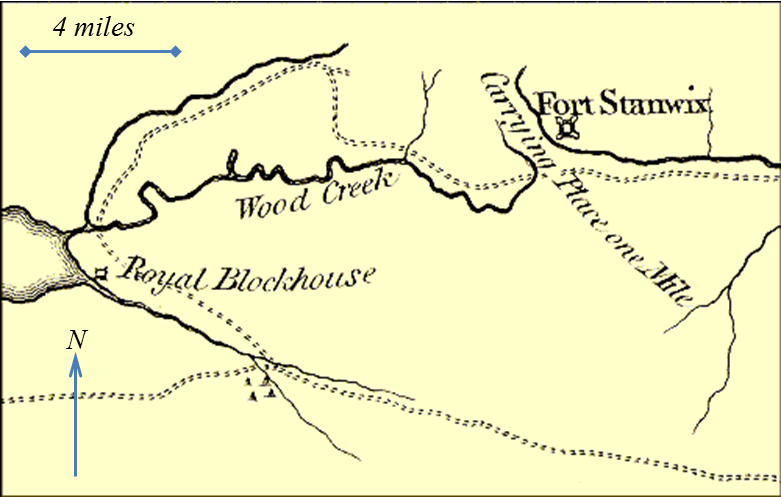
A portion of Thomas Kitchin's 1772 map of the waterway connecting the Hudson River (at Albany) and Lake Ontario (at Oswego). This portion shows the section between Fort Stanwix on the Mohawk River and Oneida Lake (at left) that was traversed by Wood Creek. The route was used heavily in the 18th and early 19th centuries. Until 1797, there was an unnavigable section between the Mohawk and Wood Creek that is labeled "Carrying Place". Canada Creek joins Wood Creek about two miles downstream from the Carry.

Wood Creek is a river in Central New York State that flows westward from the city of Rome, New York to Oneida Lake. Its waters flow ultimately to Lake Ontario, which is the easternmost of the five Great Lakes. Wood Creek is less than 20 miles (32 km) long, but has great historical importance. Wood Creek was a crucial, fragile link in the main 18th and early 19th century waterway connecting the Atlantic seaboard of North America and its interior beyond the Appalachian Mountains. This waterway ran upstream from the Hudson River (at Albany, New York) along the Mohawk River. Near present day Rome, the Mohawk River is about one mile from Wood Creek across dry land. In the 18th century, cargo and boats were portaged between the Mohawk and Wood Creek; the crossing was called the "Oneida Carry". In 1797, the Rome Canal was completed and finally established an all-water route. The waterway then followed a downstream run along Wood Creek to the east end of Oneida Lake. After a 20 mile crossing to the west end of the lake, the waterway entered the Oswego River system. This system led either to the Lake Ontario port at Oswego, or further westward along the Seneca River.

The Mohawk River route was very important for more than a century. The only other waterway crossing the Appalachians lies far to the north in Canada. This was the St. Lawrence River, which flows northeast out of Lake Ontario to Montreal, Quebec City, and the Atlantic. Philip Lord, Jr., for many years a researcher at the New York State Museum, has published extensively on the Albany-Oswego waterway and on its Wood Creek section.

== 18th Century fortifications and battles ==
Thither the bateaux were dragged on sledges and launched onto the dark and tortuous stream, which, fed by a decoction of forest leaves that oozed from the marshy shores, crept in shadow through depths of foliage, with only a belt of illumined sky gleaming between the jagged tree-tops.

— Francis Parkman

In the 18th century, boats and their cargoes coming up the Mohawk River had to be moved a few miles overland to Wood Creek at the Oneida Carry (present-day Rome). The relaunched boats then navigated downstream to Oneida Lake and the Oswego River, which discharges into Lake Ontario. Wood Creek and the Carry were used by the canoes of Native Americans, and in 1702 representatives of The Five Nations petitioned Lord Cornbury, the governor of the British colony of New York, to mark the Carry and to clear Wood Creek of obstructions. In addition to periodically clearing obstructions, in 1730 a short canal was built to bypass a notorious "hook" in the Mohawk River. It is one of the first canals built in North America.

Wood Creek and the Oneida Carry were of sufficient strategic importance that the British built two fortifications there in 1755 during the war with France (the French and Indian War (1754–1763)). Fort Bull on Wood Creek was the furthest west, and was the scene of the 1756 Battle of Fort Bull; after its destruction, it was briefly replaced by Fort Wood Creek. After the loss of Fort Oswego to the French forces in 1756, the British destroyed the Oneida Carry and Wood Creek fortifications. In 1758, the massive Fort Stanwix was constructed to defend the Oneida Carry, although it never saw action and was later abandoned. The fort was refurbished by American revolutionary forces in 1777. Stanwix was the site of an important 1777 battle in the American Revolutionary War, when British, Loyalist and indigenous forces came down from Canada and up Wood Creek to besiege the fort. They were unsuccessful, which contributed to the defeat of British forces at the Battles of Saratoga shortly thereafter. The disastrous outcome of the 1777 British campaign is considered a turning point in the American Revolution.

== Improvements by the Western Inland Lock Navigation Company ==
In 1791, following the American Revolutionary War and the independence of the United States, the Western Inland Lock Navigation Company was chartered in New York State to make improvements in the Albany-Oswego waterway. Philip Lord has written, "This tortuous route was the only highway west of any consequence 200 years ago and it was the improvement of this water route from Schenectady to Oneida Lake that was the mission of Philip Schuyler's Western Inland Lock Navigation Company in 1792." When completed in 1803, the program of improvements would greatly increase the shipping along the waterway and substantially reduce its cost. The increasing population of settlers in western New York was also served by this waterway. The route to the western regions passed through Oneida Lake and the Oneida River. It then followed the Seneca River upstream, instead of going downstream to Oswego. This route stretched as far as Rochester and Canandaigua Lake.

Philip Lord and Chris Salisbury write, "The most troublesome of the inland waterways was Wood Creek, a narrow and twisted channel which connected the west end of the 1797 Rome Canal to the east end of Oneida Lake (now Sylvan Beach). This stream was so narrow that travelers often recorded they could jump across it where the boats first entered it, and it was so deficient of water that boatmen often had to negotiate with a miller just above the landing place to release extra water from his pond to get the boats floated and on their way. Yet in spite of its fragility, Wood Creek was the lynchpin of the waterway route to the Great Lakes." Among the improvements to the Wood Creek waterway were 13 short canals cut in 1793 that bypassed meanders (or "hooks") in the creek; the cuts were "among the earliest artificial waterways for navigation in North America". In 1802 four wooden locks were constructed to aid the passage from the end of the Rome Canal to the junction with Canada Creek; unusually, the locks were "covered", as was common for bridges in this region in the 19th century. Lord and Salisbury have also discovered that a man named Abraham Ogden had used a sophisticated method known as "brushpiling" or a "kid weir" to improve navigation on Wood Creek; they write, "it is in the upper reaches of this tiny stream that we find extraordinary evidence of a direct linkage between American wilderness engineering and English waterway history. ...its use in Wood Creek in 1803 is the first application of this ancient English erosion control technology in the United States."

The Oneida Carry was replaced by the Rome Canal in 1797. The program of improvements to the Albany-Oswego waterway by the Western Inland Lock Navigation Company had been completed by 1803, which permitted the replacement of the relatively small boats (batteaux) by heavier craft.

== Prelude to the Erie Canal ==
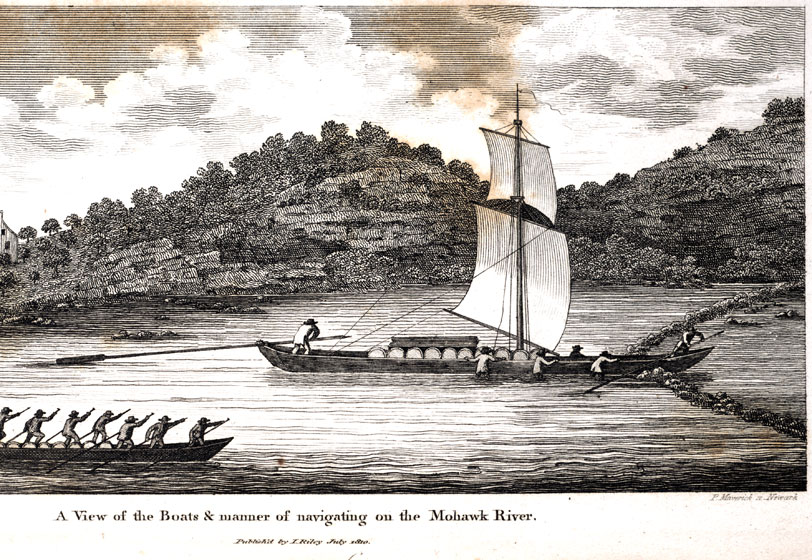
Durham boat (with sails) traveling on the Mohawk River in 1807. The boat is passing through the opening at the center of a V-shaped rock wing dam similar to eel weirs constructed by Native Americans.

As noted by Ronald E. Shaw, "These improvements made it possible in times of sufficient water for new Durham boats as long as sixty feet and carrying sixteen tons to supplant those carrying only a ton and a half used heretofore on the river. The cost of transportation from Albany to Seneca Lake was reduced from $100 to $32 a ton, and that from Albany to Niagara by half. Down the canals came furs, lumber, pot and pearl ashes, wheat, and salt, and up them moved boats 'principally laded with European or Indian productions or manufactures'." In 1812 about 1500 tons of cargo was moved through Rome by this route.

In the mid 19th century, John MacGregor wrote of the waterway, "However imperfect the navigation, as compared with that of the Erie Canal, which superseded it, its influence on the prosperity, the early and rapid settlement of western New York, is incalculable." However, Shaw concluded that "even with the company's works in operation the river boats could never supplant wagon carriage by land ... The canal builders of this period must be judged to have left a record more of failure than success." Nonetheless, thousands of workmen had learned the trades of canal builders, and the de facto engineers of the waterway had acquired experience and vision. Shaw writes that these men "bent on improving the navigation on the Mohawk at the turn of the century would be intimately involved with the New York canals for the remainder of their lives. Their experiences in canal making were being stored for future use. Limited as was their success, the efforts of these men to develop an inland water empire served as the first major step to the development of a greater project that would go far beyond Seneca Lake and Oswego, reaching its destination on the shores of Lake Erie."

== Closing of the Wood Creek to Oswego waterway ==
In 1817 New York State chartered the Erie Canal, which would solve the myriad problems of the Albany-Oswego waterway by building a system of unprecedented size and sophistication. In 1820 the works of the Western Inland Lock Navigation Company were purchased for the use of the Erie Canal, which bypassed the Wood Creek to Oswego portion of the old waterway in favor of a direct canal from Rome through Syracuse and Rochester to Buffalo, on Lake Erie. The Rome Canal and the waterway running west along Wood Creek to Oneida Lake were abandoned. The century when tiny Wood Creek was a channel for much of the cargo between the inlands of North America and the Atlantic seaboard had ended.
