= Oneida Lake =

Lake in New York state

- Tsioqui (Oneida)
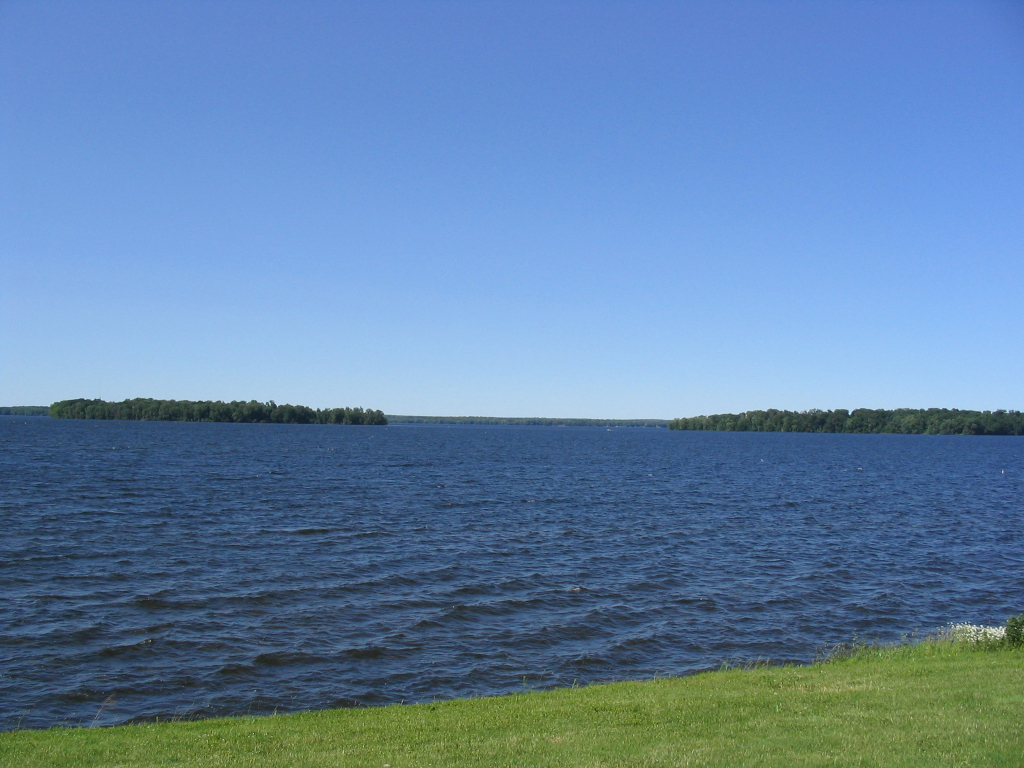
- View of Frenchman Island and Dunham Island from Cicero, a suburban Syracuse town

- Location within New York Oneida Lake (the United States)
- Location: Oneida / Oswego counties, New York, United States
- Coordinates: 43°12′0″N 75°54′0″W
- Primary inflows: Oneida Creek, Fish Creek, Chittenango Creek
- Primary outflows: Oneida River
- Basin countries: United States
- Max. length: 21 mi (34 km)
- Max. width: 5 mi (8.0 km)
- Surface area: 50,894 acres (79.5 sq mi; 206.0 km^{2})
- Average depth: 22 ft (6.7 m)
- Max. depth: 55 ft (17 m)
- Water volume: .331 cu mi (1.38 km^{3})
- Surface elevation: 369 ft (112 m)
- Islands: Big Isle, Dunham's Island, Frenchman Island, Little Island, Long Island, Wantry Island
- Settlements: (see article)

Oneida Lake is the largest lake entirely within New York state, with a surface area of 79.8 square miles (207 km^{2}). The lake is located northeast of Syracuse and near the Great Lakes. It feeds the Oneida River, a tributary of the Oswego River, which flows into Lake Ontario. From the earliest times until the opening of the Erie Canal in 1825, the lake was part of an important waterway connecting the Atlantic seaboard of North America to the continental interior.

The lake is about 21 miles (34 km) long and about 5 miles (8.0 km) wide with an average depth of 22 feet (6.7 m). The shoreline is about 55 miles (89 km). Portions of six counties and 69 communities are in the watershed. Oneida Creek, which flows past the cities of Oneida and Sherrill, empties into the southeast part of the lake, at South Bay. While not geologically considered one of the Finger Lakes, Oneida Lake, because of its proximity, is referred by some as their "thumb".

== Name ==
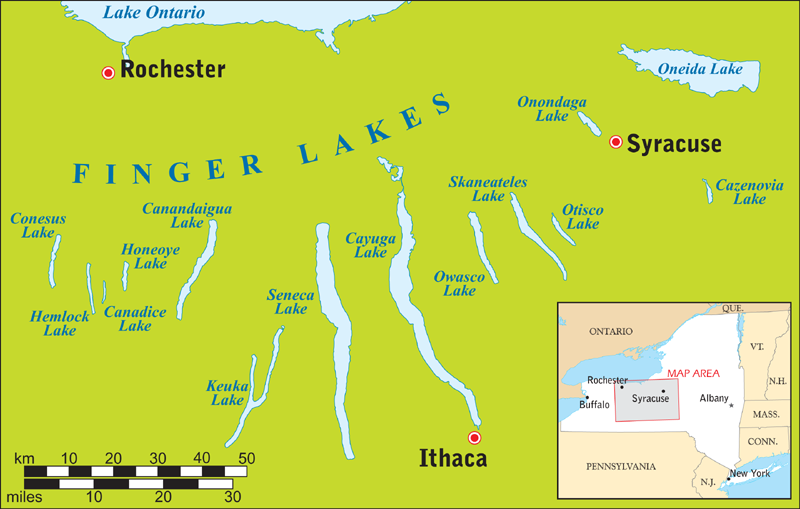
Map showing Oneida Lake in the upper right and the Finger Lakes in relation to Lake Ontario and upstate New York

The lake is named for the Oneida, the Iroquoian Native American tribe that historically occupied a large region around the lake, one of the Six Nations of the Iroquois. The name Oneida comes from the word Oneyoteaka, their endonym which translates to "People of the Standing Stone". The Oneida called the lake Tsioqui in their language, meaning "White Water".

== History of navigation ==
During the 18th and early 19th centuries Oneida Lake and its tributary Wood Creek were part of the Albany-Oswego waterway from the Atlantic seaboard westward via the Hudson River and through the Appalachian Mountains via the Mohawk River; travel westward then was by portage over the Oneida Carry to the Wood Creek-Oneida Lake system. The navigable waterway exited Oneida Lake by the Oneida River, which led to the Oswego River and Lake Ontario, from where travelers could reach the other Great Lakes.

Following the American Revolutionary War, the United States forced the Iroquois nations to cede most of their lands. In addition, demand from settlers created pressure for such cessions. White settlers altered the natural waterway by constructing a canal with locks within Wood Creek to Oneida Lake. This system was significantly improved—from 1792 to 1803—by cutting a canal across the Oneida Carry, after which commercial shipping across Oneida Lake increased substantially. Even more significant was the completion in 1825 of the Erie Canal, which bypassed the Oneida Lake system and enhanced travel through the entire Mohawk Valley. This caused the population around the lake to lose their navigable waterway eastward.

In 1835 Oneida Lake was connected to the Erie Canal system by construction of the (old) Oneida Canal, which ran about 4.5 miles (7.2 km) from Higginsville on the Erie Canal northward to Wood Creek, about 2 miles (3.2 km) upstream of Oneida Lake. Built poorly with wooden locks, the Oneida Canal was closed in 1863.

When the Erie Canal was redesigned and reconstructed to form the New York State Barge Canal in the early 20th century, the engineers made use of natural rivers and lakes where possible. The new barges were powered internally (by diesel or steam engines), so they could travel open water and against a current; the system no longer needed infrastructure for drawing vessels externally — i.e., drawpaths and draft animals. After it straightened Fish Creek on the east, the new canalway entered Oneida Lake at Sylvan Beach and exited west with the Oneida River at Brewerton. New terminal walls at Sylvan Beach, Cleveland, and Brewerton allowed barges to load and unload cargo and to stay overnight. A new break wall was installed, preventing lake waves from entering the canal and protecting against shoaling. These improvements provided towns along the shoreline of Oneida Lake with access again to navigable waterways east and west.

== Angling Activity ==
Oneida Lake, in New York, ranks third in the state for angling activity, following Lake Ontario and Lake Erie. In 2017, it saw an estimated 649,000 angler-days. This angling generates over $21 million annually, significantly benefiting the economy. Walleye are the main target, however, yellow perch and black bass are also popular. The population of walleye is managed through stocking, adaptive fishing regulation and cormorant control. The daily limit was increased from 3 to 5 fish in May 2022.

== Geology ==
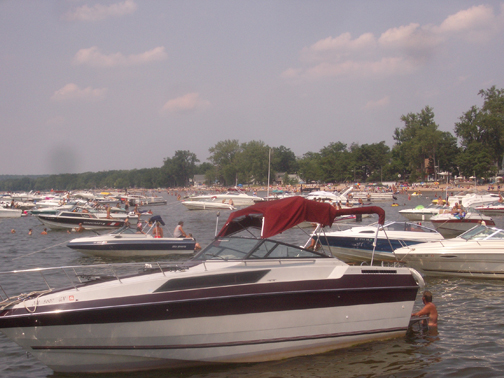
Located on the eastern shore of Oneida Lake, Sylvan Beach, New York is a popular summer boating destination, thanks to its shallow water and sandy bottom.

Oneida Lake is a remnant of Glacial Lake Iroquois, a large prehistoric lake formed nearly 12,000 years ago when glaciers blocked (from downstream) the flow of the St. Lawrence River, the outlet of the Great Lakes to the Atlantic Ocean. As global warming caused rapid melting, the glaciers shifted northwards, causing the blockage. As the glaciers continued to melt, a connection between the St. Lawrence River and the Atlantic Ocean opened, and the waters of Lake Iroquois drained. Oneida Lake was created when the water persisted in a deeper depression within the former Lake Iroquois bed. This depression is also called a basin.

=== Geochemistry ===
Oneida Lake is naturally eutrophic. It is rich in nutrients (phosphorus), highly productive, and supports abundant algae growth. It has been in a eutrophic state for over 300 years.

Oneida Lake is known for forming ferromanganese nodules, also referred to as "Oneida Lake pancakes". These are disc-shaped mud concretions of iron and manganese found on the lake's shoals, which are at depths of less than 27 feet.

== Climate ==
Oneida is described to have a humid continental climate. The climate is seasonal, with average July temperatures being 70.2 °F and average January temperatures in being 21.1 °F. Because Oneida Lake is shallow, it is warmer than the deeper Finger Lakes in summer and its surface freezes solidly in winter. Due to sub-surface currents, the ice does not form uniformly. It is popular for the winter sports of ice fishing and snowmobiling. Precipitation is distributed evenly throughout the year. The annual precipitation average is 45.3 inches. During the winter, there are regular snowstorms, strong winds, and bitter cold air coming from the southern expansion of continental polar air masses.

It is hypothesized that in 2050, because of climate change, Oneida Lake's water temperatures from April to November will increase by 2.5 degrees Fahrenheit. By the end of the century, the lake will most likely be higher by 6 degrees Fahrenheit. This would remove oxygen, change the composition of the species, and likely eliminate the cold water fish species. The surface temperature of the lake rapidly increasing while the lower layers remain cooler results in stratification.

== Adjacent places ==
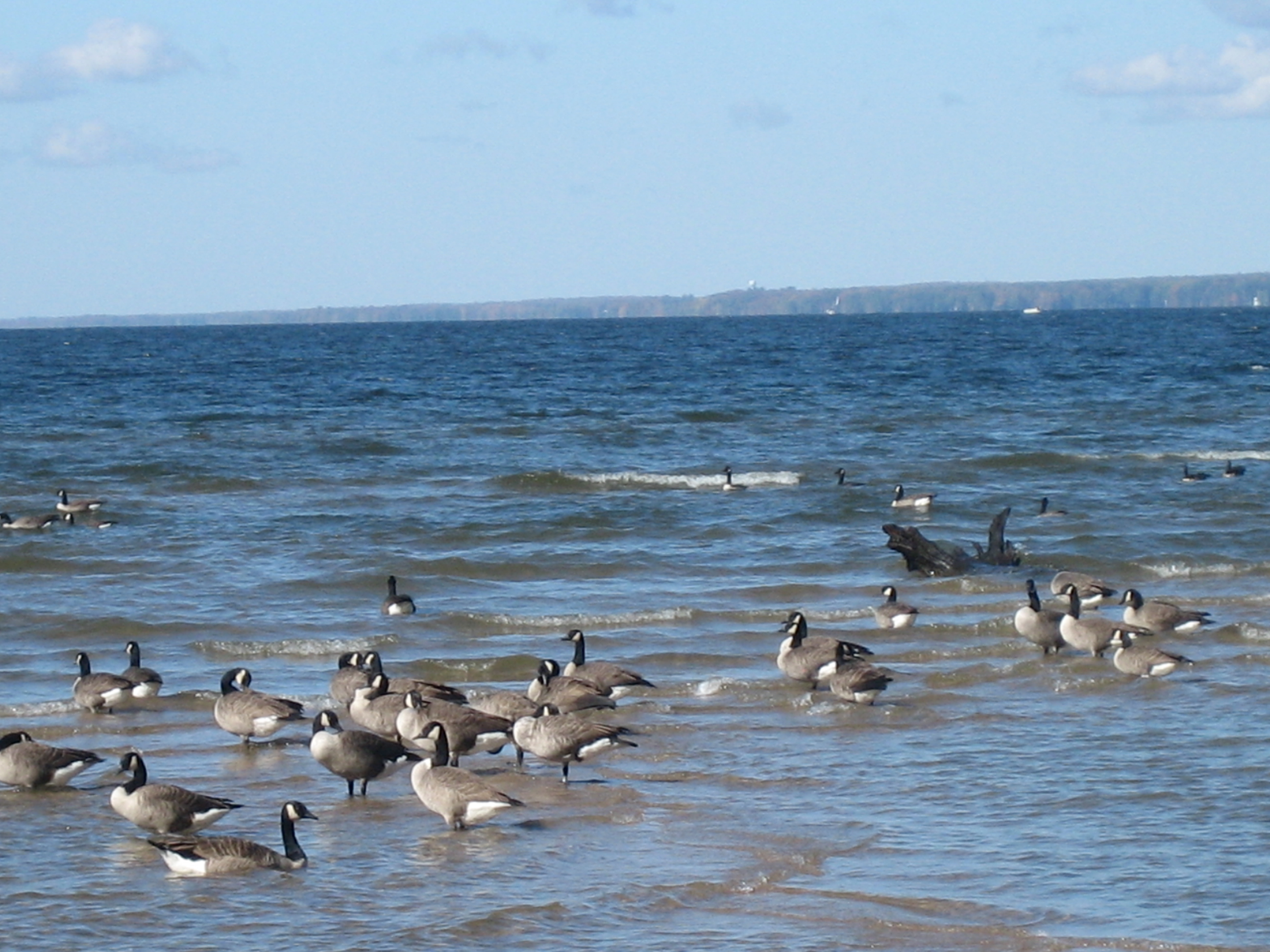
Canada geese gather to migrate on Oneida Lake at Verona Beach State Park

=== Counties ===
- Madison County
- Oneida County
- Onondaga County
- Oswego County

=== Towns and villages ===
- Brewerton—Southwest
- Bridgeport—Southwest
- Cicero—Southwest
- Cleveland—North
- Constantia—North
- Hastings—West
- Jewell—Northeast
- Lakeport—South
- Lenox—South
- South Bay—Southeast
- Sullivan—South
- Sylvan Beach—East
- Verona—East
- Vienna—North
- West Monroe—Northwest

=== State parks ===
- Frenchman Island State Park
- Verona Beach State Park

== Namesakes ==
Oneida Lake is the namesake of Oneida Lacus, a hydrocarbon lake on the Saturnian moon Titan. That "lake" is composed of liquid methane and ethane, and is located at 76.14°N and 131.83°W on Titan's globe.

Oneida County, Idaho is also named for the lake.
