= Adam Helmer =

American soldier (1754–1830)

Adam F. Helmer
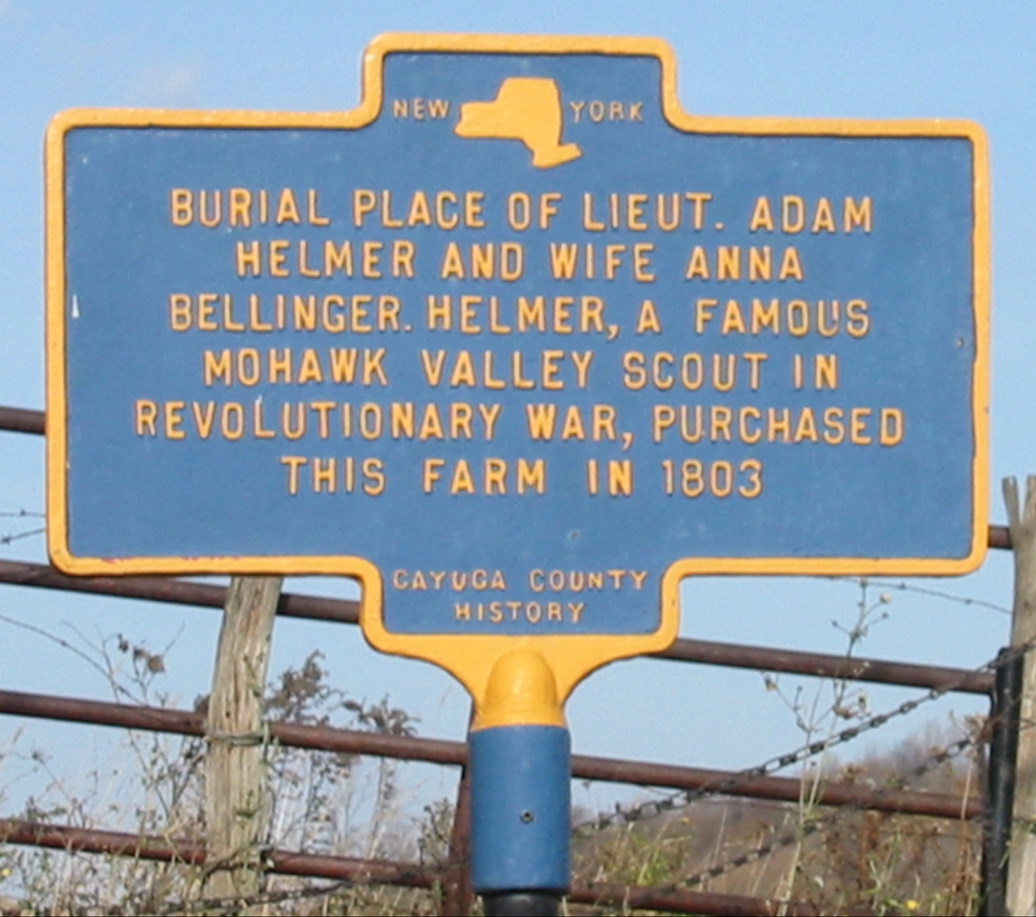
- Marker at the burial site of Helmer and his wife on the north side of Cottle Road in the Town of Brutus, New York. Their grave stones were moved to the Weedsport Rural Cemetery.
- Born: c.1754 German Flatts, New York, US
- Died: April 9, 1830; Brutus, New York, US
- Resting place: Grave stone in Weedsport Rural Cemetery
- Occupation: Farmer
- Known for: Revolutionary War Hero
- Title: Lieutenant in the Provincial Militia and Scout in Captain John Breadbake's company
- Spouse: Anna Bellinger (1757–1841)
- Children: 10

Adam Frederick Helmer (c. 1754 – April 9, 1830), also known as John Adam Frederick Helmer and Hans Adam Friedrich Helmer, was an American Revolutionary War soldier among those of the Mohawk Valley and surrounding regions of New York State. He was made nationally famous by Walter D. Edmonds' popular 1936 novel Drums Along the Mohawk with its depiction of "Adam Helmer's Run" of September 16, 1778, to warn the people of German Flatts of the approach of Joseph Brant and his company of Indians and Tories.

== Background ==
Adam Helmer was born in German Flatts, New York, to Maria Barbara Kast, and George Friedrich Helmer, who was born on June 9, 1706, in Neustadt an der Weinstrasse a city in the Rhineland-Palatinate region in southwestern Germany. G.F. Helmer emigrated to America sometime before 1710 and eventually settled in one of the numerous Palatine farming communities on the south side of the Mohawk River in central New York.

As late as 1774, this Palatine district and others in the area widely supported British control, but with the death of the powerful loyalist Mohawk Valley landowner Sir William Johnson and news of the Declaration of Rights by the Continental Congress, anti-British sentiments began to surface and a Tryon County Committee of Safety was organized. This and the news of Continental Army resistance at the Battle of Lexington and Concord encouraged the remaining Johnson family and other loyalists to fortify their properties and to recruit Iroquois to side with the British. This in turn prompted the colonists in 1775 to organize a militia under the command of Colonel Nicholas Herkimer. Early the next year, Herkimer aided General Philip Schuyler who was sent by Congress to disarm the Loyalists. Many of the loyalists and sympathizing Iroquois led by William Johnson's son Sir John Johnson escaped to Canada where they began to organize to take back their Mohawk Valley holdings.

During the summer of 1776 Colonel Herkimer allowed his regular militia to return to their farms; however, about one out of every fifteen soldiers, including Lieutenant Adam Helmer, was assigned to ranger duty. Helmer was assigned as a scout in Captain John Breadbake's company.

== Battle of Oriskany ==
In the summer of 1777, Herkimer, by then a brigadier general in the provincial militia, was warned by friendly Oneidas of the impending siege of Fort Stanwix (known to the Americans as Fort Schuyler) by British Lieutenant Colonel Barry St. Leger. General Herkimer ordered Tryon County militia to assemble at Fort Dayton to go to the aid of Colonel Peter Gansevoort at Fort Stanwix. G.F. Helmer and Adam Helmer's brother Johan Fredrich Helmer, as part of the Tryon County militia were called up. Herkimer sent three scouts, Captain Hans Mark Demuth, Hans Yost Folts, and Lieutenant Adam Helmer to Fort Stanwix to relay the news to Colonel Gansevoort. Pressured by his subordinate commanders on August 6, General Herkimer reluctantly and prematurely set out to attack St. Leger's army. While passing through a ravine, they were ambushed by British regulars, Tories, and Indians under the command of Joseph Brant and John Butler, thus starting what would become known as the Battle of Oriskany, Adam Helmer lost his brother, Capt. Johann Friedrich Helmer, in the battle and another, Lt. George Frederick Helmer II, was seriously wounded.

Helmer, the fittest of the three scouts, reached Fort Stanwix with the message ahead of the other two, having traversed swampy terrain and floated down river when a severe storm flooded his route. News of the Oriskany battle arrived shortly after Helmer's did, and Ganesvoort ordered an attack on the British encampments. Some combination of the weather and Gansevoort's attack contributed to the retreat of the British from the Oriskany battlefield back to their camps surrounding the fort. In any case, Herkimer's troops were able to escape to await reinforcements. Herkimer himself was wounded in the fight, returned to his home and died soon after. Gansevoort refused to submit to the siege, and the British withdrew from the area with the news that Benedict Arnold had arrived at Fort Dayton with reinforcements.

== Adam Helmer's run ==
In September 1778, Lt. Helmer and eight scouts under his command were sent to the Unadilla River Valley to spy on Joseph Brant's company of Indians and Tories who were encamped at Unadilla near the confluence of the Unadilla and Susquehanna Rivers. It was feared that Brant would send a raiding party north to the Mohawk Valley during the harvest season to forcefully obtain stores for the winter ahead. When Helmer's scouts reached Edmeston Manor, the farm of Percifer Carr, just north of what is now South Edmeston, they were attacked by a large group of Brant's men, apparently part of the feared raiding party on its way north. Several of the scouts were killed, but Helmer managed to escape.

Helmer took off running to the north-east, through the hills, toward Schuyler Lake and then north to Andrustown (near present-day Jordanville, New York) where he warned his sister's family of the impending raid and obtained fresh footwear. He also warned settlers at Columbia and Petrie's Corners, most of whom then fled to safety at Fort Dayton. When Helmer arrived at the fort, severely torn up from his run, he told Colonel Peter Bellinger, the commander of the fort, that he had counted at least 200 of the attackers en route to the valley. (see Attack on German Flatts (1778)). The straight-line distance from Carr's farm to Fort Dayton is about thirty miles, and Helmer's winding and hilly route was far from straight. It was said that Helmer then slept for 36 hours straight. During his sleep, on September 17, 1778, the farms of the area were destroyed by Brant's raid. The total loss of property in the raid was reported as: 63 houses, 59 barns, full of grain, 3 grist mills, 235 horses, 229 horned cattle, 279 sheep, and 93 oxen. Only two men were reported killed in the attack, one by refusing to leave his home when warned.

Three days later Helmer led another group of militia back to the Carr farm on the Unadilla, discovered the bodies of three of his scouts, and buried them at that site. The fate of the other five scouts is not known.

Helmer also served in the New York State Levies under Colonel Lewis DuBois.

== Personal ==
Helmer married Anna Bellinger (1757–1841) and sired ten children: Frederick (1777), Margaret (1778), Anna (1781), Adam (1783), Peter (1786), Elizabeth (1788), Catharine (1790), David (179?), Maria Barbara (1795), and Eve (1800).

Adam Helmer died on April 9, 1830, in the town of Brutus in Cayuga County, New York.

== Helmer in novel and film ==
Adam Helmer was an important but fictionalized character in Edmonds' novel, Drums Along the Mohawk. Although Helmer's military actions were generally portrayed with accuracy, including his famous run, Edmonds' description of his person varies from historic description. The book pictures Helmer as a large, unschooled, bachelor womanizer with long blonde hair, while historic descriptions indicate he was a lean 150 pounds (68 kg), married farmer, seeming to have more in common with the book's main character, Gil Martin.

In John Ford's 1939 film adaptation of the novel, Helmer is portrayed by Ward Bond as "Adam Hartman". Helmer's run was omitted from the film and replaced with a run by Gil to get reinforcements from the nearest fort. The run is the heroic highpoint of the film.
