= Peter Bellinger =

American military commander (1726–1813)

Peter P. Bellinger
- Born: March 1726 German Flatts, Herkimer County, Province of New York
- Died: March 26, 1813 (aged 86–87) German Flatts, Herkimer County, New York
- Allegiance: United States
- Rank: Colonel (United States)
- Conflicts: Battle of Oriskany
- Spouse: Delia Herkimer
- Children: Joseph Bellinger

Colonel Peter P. Bellinger (March 1726 – 26 March 1813) was an American who commanded the 4th Regiment of the Tyron County militia during the American Revolutionary War. He served under General Nicholas Herkimer, who was also Bellinger's brother-in-law, as he married Herkimer's sister, Delia Herkimer, in January 1750. He lived on a farm located in Herkimer, New York, just west of the Foley Place on German Street. He fought at the Battle of Oriskany on August 6, 1777, where he commanded the 4th Battalion. Peter Bellinger died on March 26, 1813.

== Life ==
Peter P. Bellinger was born in March of 1726, in German Flatts, Herkimer County, Province of New York. In January of 1750, he married Delia Herkimer, who was the sister of Nicholas Herkimer, a General whom Bellinger would serve under during the Revolutionary War. He had a son, Joseph Bellinger, who was born c. 1760. When the war broke out in 1775, Bellinger enlisted in the Continental Army, and climbed the ranks, eventually reaching the rank of Colonel. On August 6, 1777, the Battle of Oriskany occurred, where Bellinger commanded the 4th Regiment of the Tyron County militia. Peter Bellinger died on March 26, 1813, at age 86 or 87. He was buried at Fort Herkimer Church.

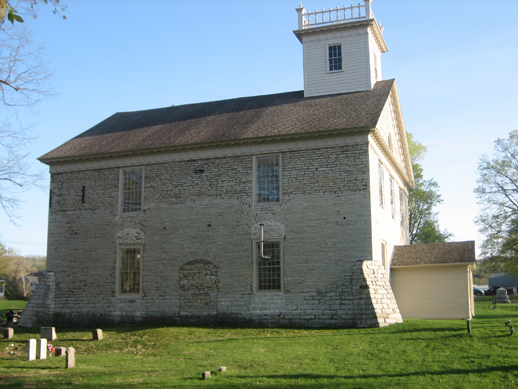
Fort Herkimer Church, where Colonel Bellinger is buried
