= Oriskany Battlefield State Historic Site =

Coordinates: 43.177259°N 75.369521°W

- Oriskany Battlefield
- U.S. National Register of Historic Places
- U.S. National Historic Landmark
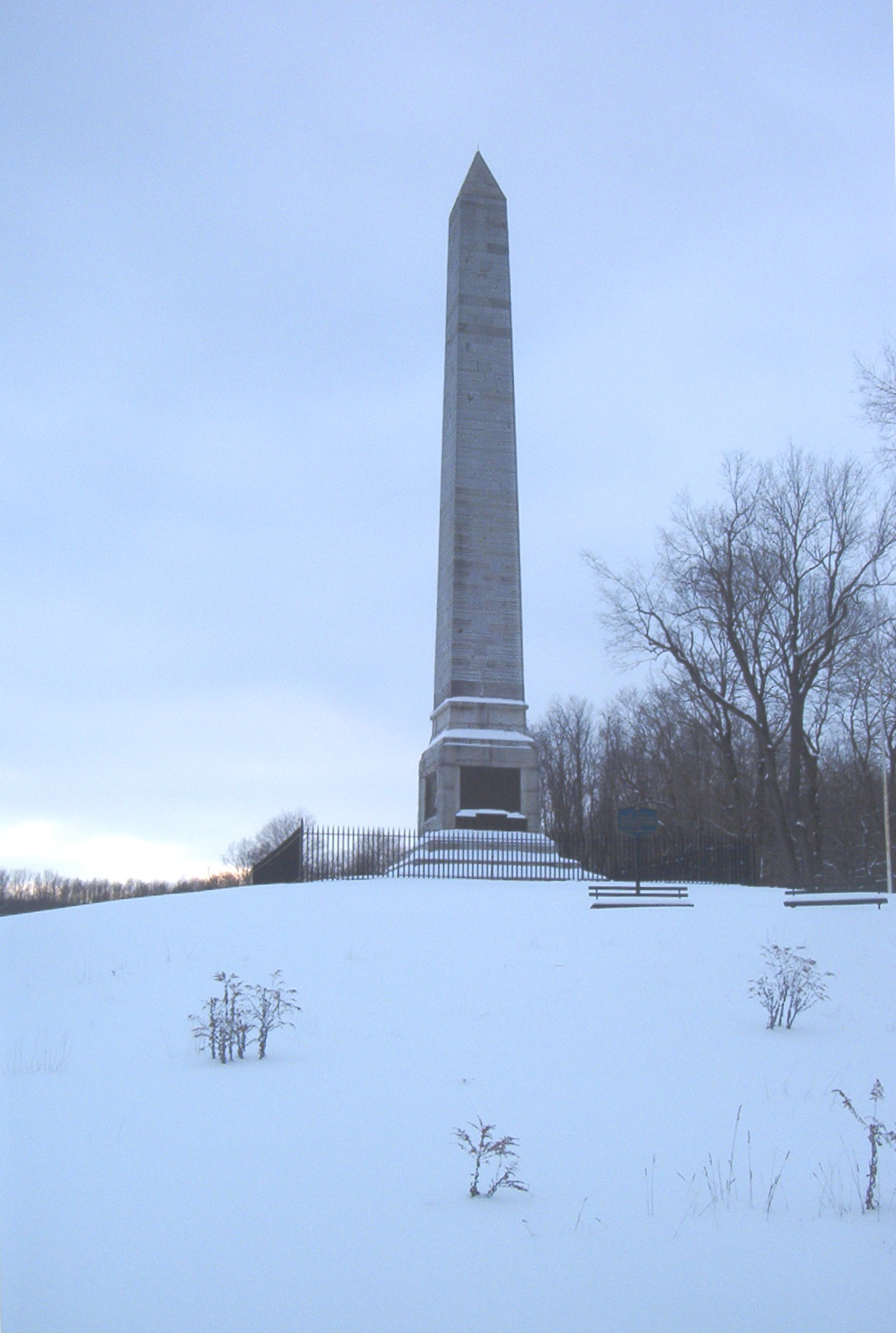
- Oriskany Battlefield monument
- Location: 7801 State Route 69, Oriskany, New York, United States
- Built: 1884
- NRHP reference No.: 66000558

Significant dates
- Added to NRHP: October 15, 1966
- Designated NHL: November 23, 1962

Oriskany Battlefield State Historic Site is a historic site in Oneida County, New York, United States that marks the Battle of Oriskany, fought in 1777 during the American Revolution, one of the bloodiest engagements of the war.

The park is northwest of the Village of Oriskany on NY Route 69 and is southeast of the City of Rome. An obelisk, with plaques at the base commemorating the battle and its participants, is the central feature of the site.

The battlefield is on the south side of the Mohawk River. The terrain consists of small rises, divided by ravines, above Mohawk River bottomlands.

== Battle ==
Patriot militia General Nicholas Herkimer, leading a relief column to the besieged Fort Stanwix, was ambushed in a ravine by Iroquois chief Joseph Brant, leading a mixed group of Iroquois and Tories. Herkimer had his ambushed militia fight in pairs behind cover. One militiaman fired, while he was reloading the other militiaman covered him. This tactic was effective due to the Iroquois warriors tactics of charging the enemy after they fired. After sustaining high casualties in the number of native War Chiefs, and a heavy downpour the British forces withdrew, leaving the Tryon County militia in possession of the field. The occupants at the fort used the reduction in the force before them as an opportunity to sally out and sack the British camp. Herkimer died of his wounds days later. Oriskany is known as the bloodiest battle of the American Revolution. In respects to the number of combatants, casualties sustained and the fact that many of the combatants had friends and relatives on the opposing side. See Battle of Oriskany for more details.

== Commemoration ==
A monument at the site stands above a small rise that many of the ambushed Americans found their way to, and where Herkimer, wounded, rallied and directed the American forces. Plaques on the monument depict Herkimer and list many of the American participants in the battle.

The monument was dedicated in 1884.

The site was declared a National Historic Landmark in 1962.

It is a New York State Historic Site.

== Activities and services ==
Visitor center and museum, scenic views, picnic area, hiking, tours, and re-enactments.

== See also ==
- Herkimer Home State Historic Site
- Mohawk Upper Castle Historic District
- List of National Historic Landmarks in New York
- List of New York State Historic Sites

== Photos ==
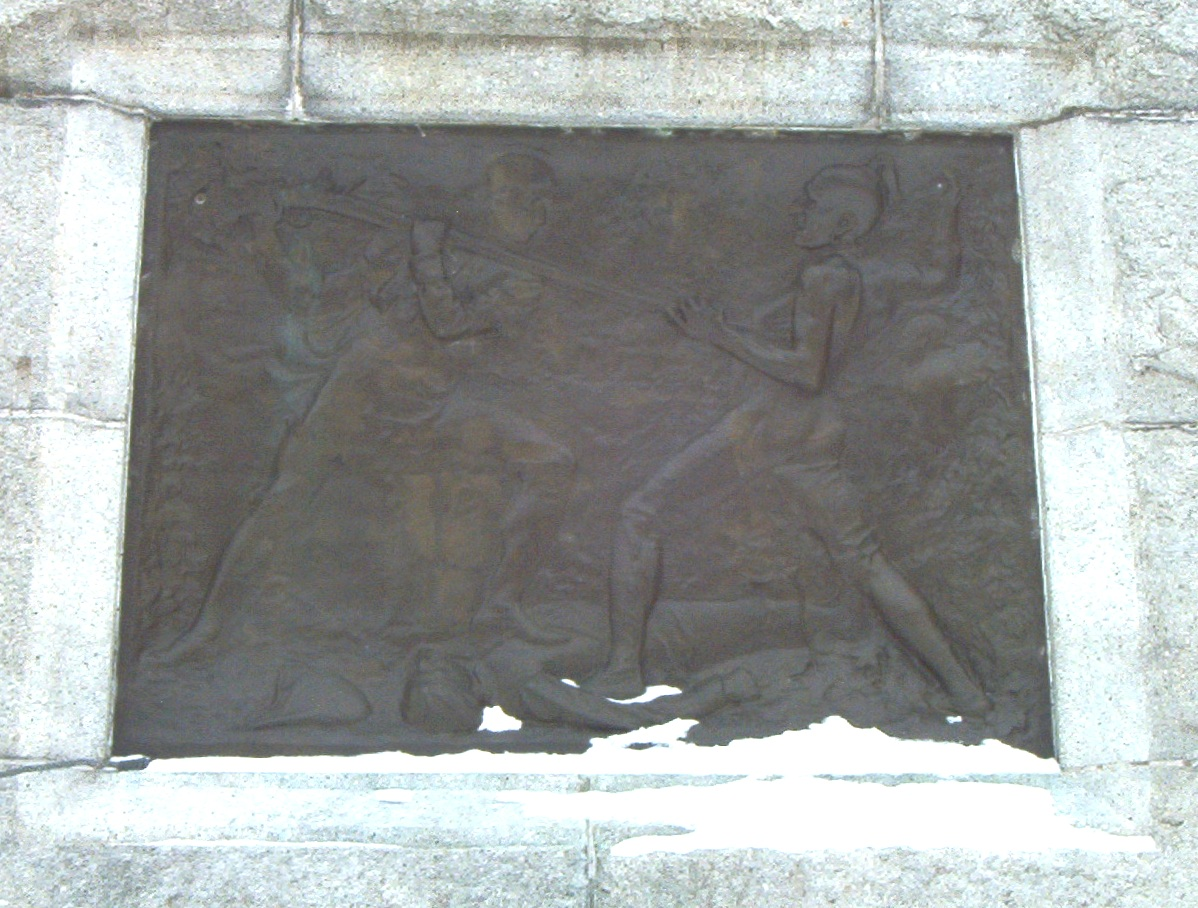
Combat

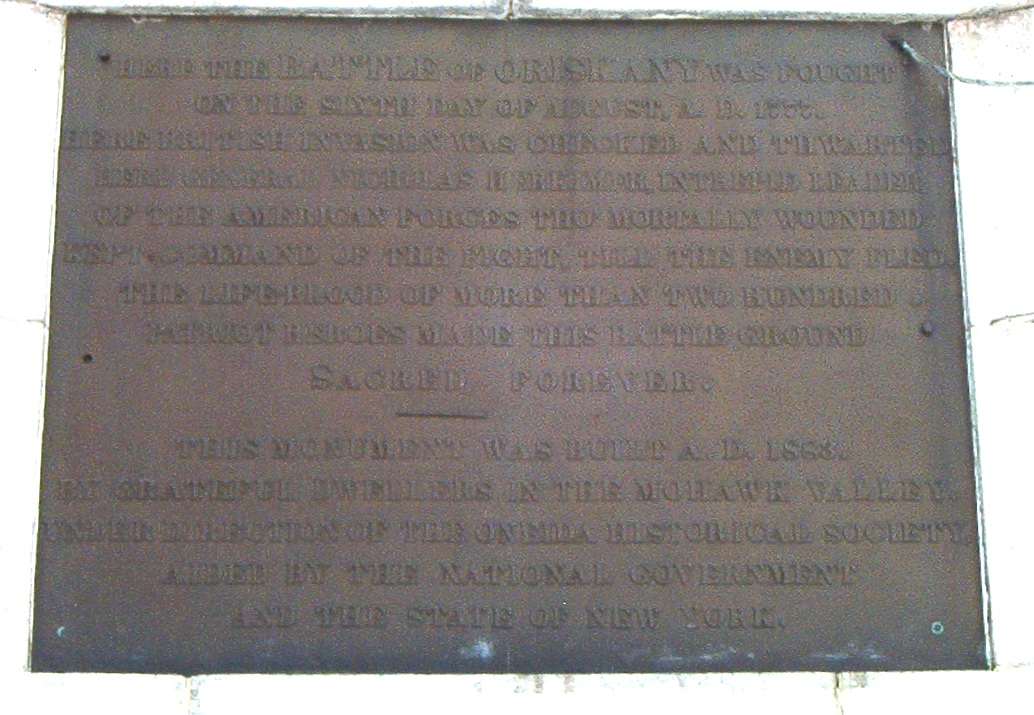
Text description

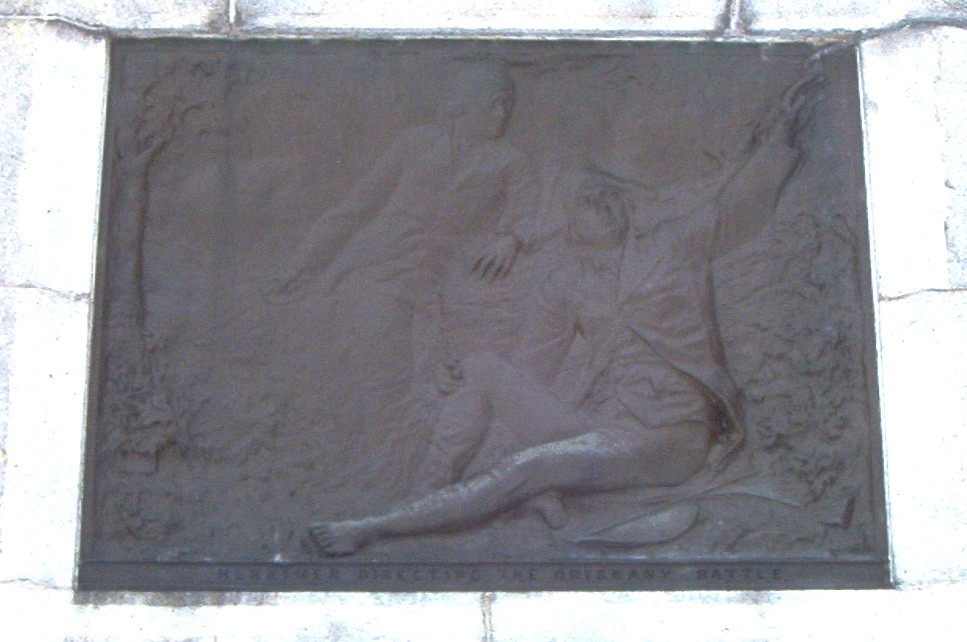
Herkimer directing the battle

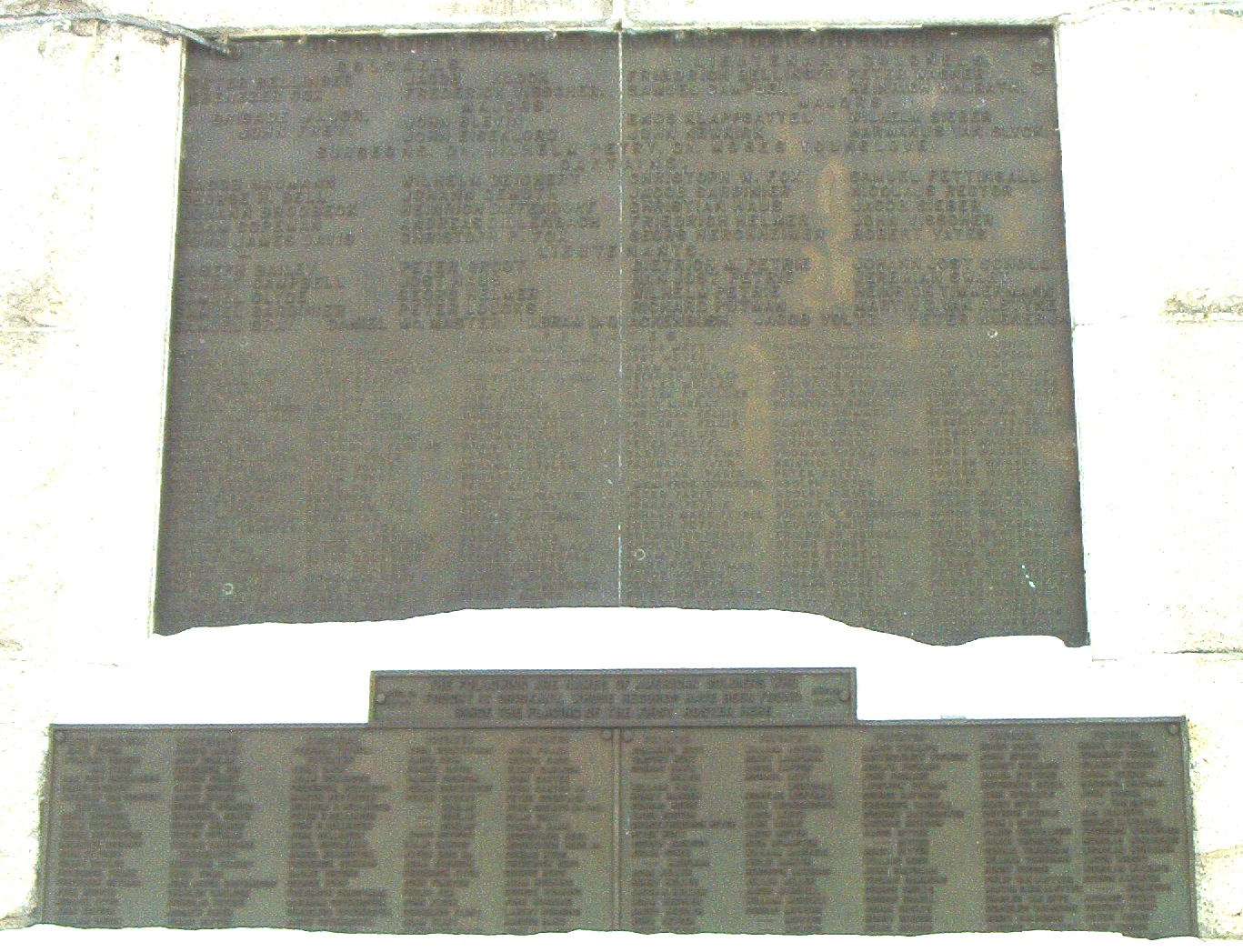
Tryon militia participants

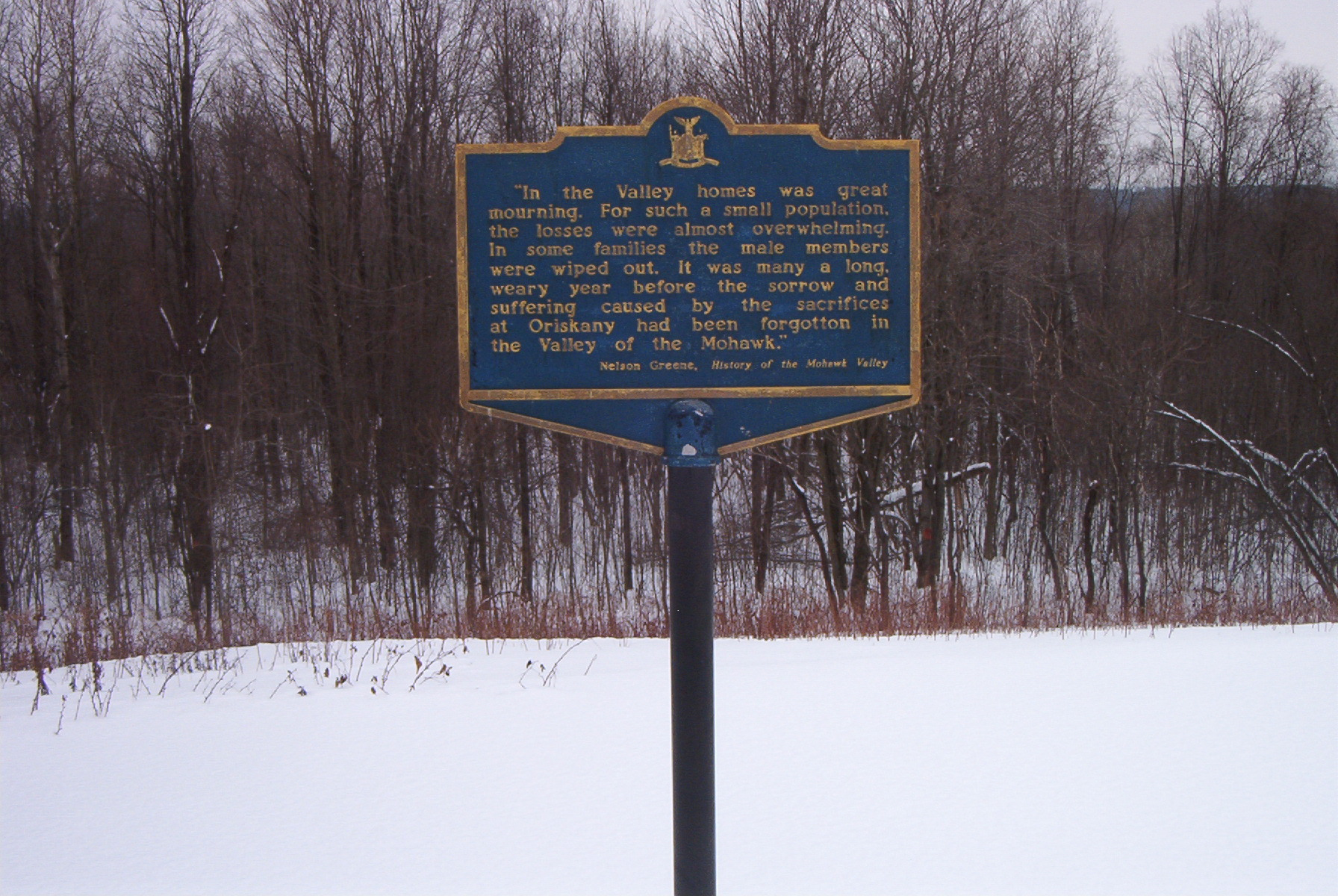
Plaque before Mohawk River bottomlands

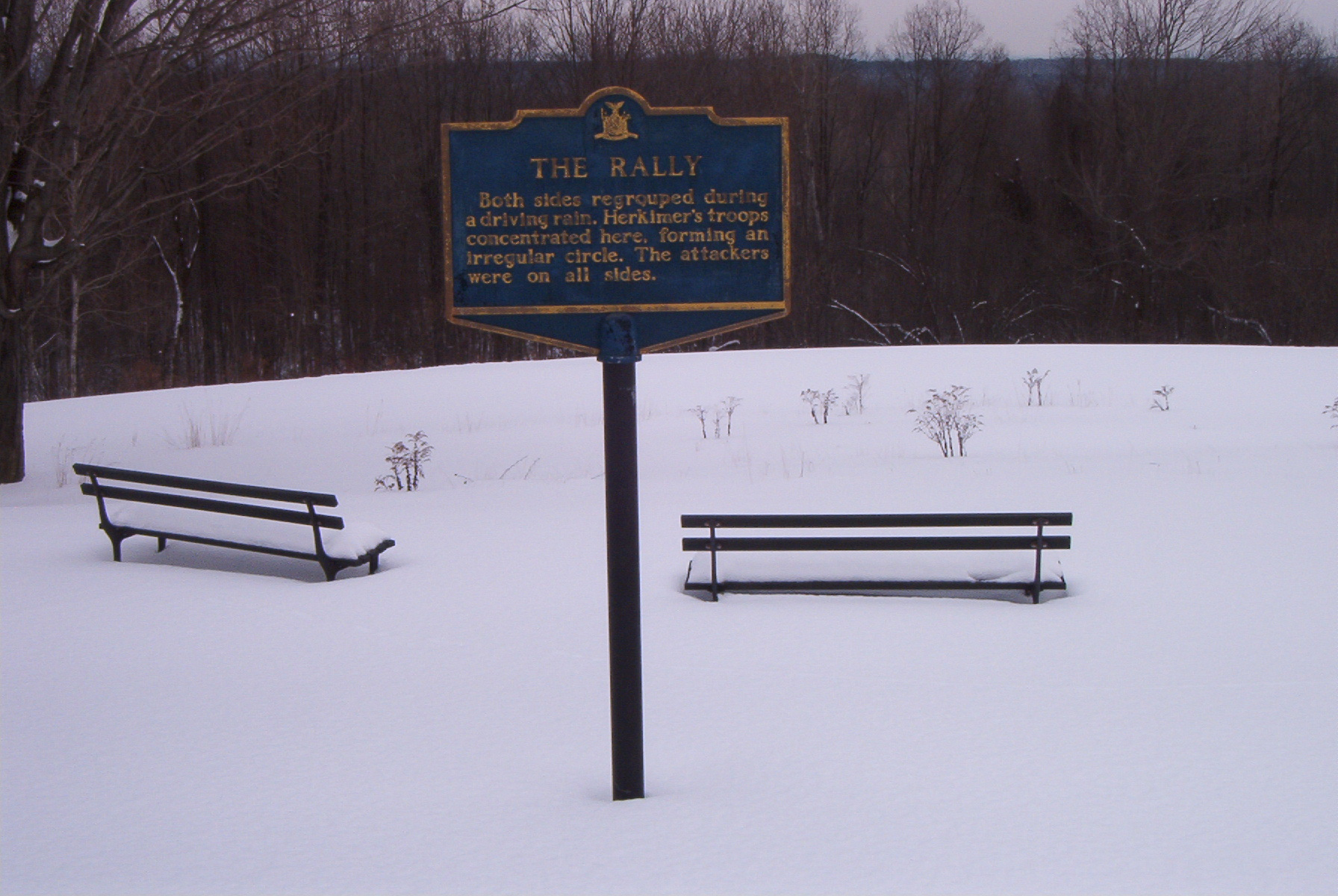
Plaque at rally site
