= Fort Dayton =

American Revolutionary War fort

Coordinates: 43°01′45″N 74°59′24″W

Fort Dayton was an American Revolutionary War fort located on the north side of the Mohawk River at West Canada Creek, in what is now Herkimer, New York. A fort had previously been built on the same site during the French and Indian War.

It should not be confused with Fort Herkimer, which was located on the south side of the Mohawk River, in German Flatts, New York.

== History ==
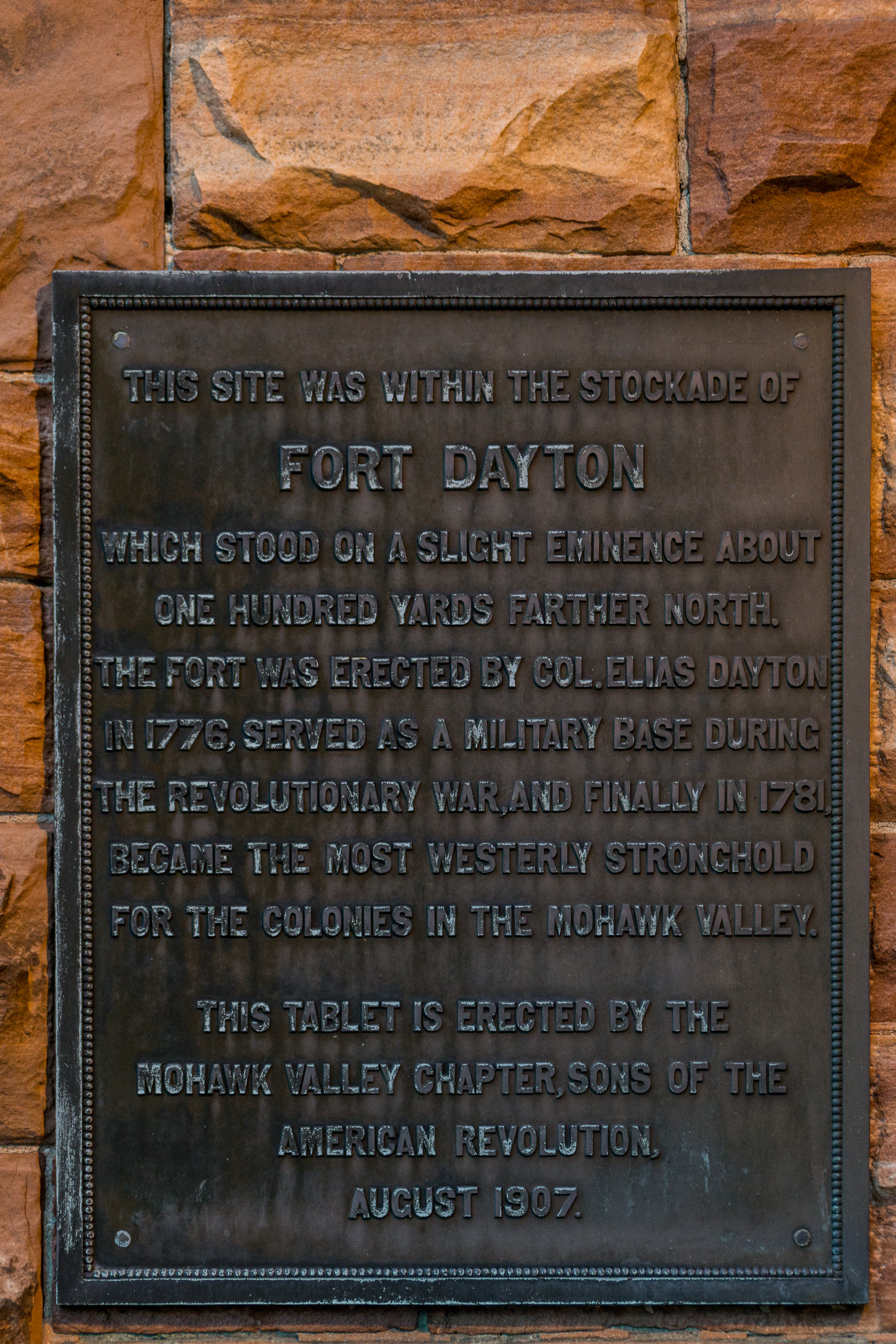
This plaque on the County Treasurer's Office in Herkimer, New York references Fort Dayton. The site was located within the fort's stockade.

Fort Dayton is named for Colonel Elias Dayton, who led the construction effort in 1776. It was one of several forts constructed in the Mohawk Valley.

When the American Revolutionary War started, the fort was described as "little better than a dilapidated block-house". It was rebuilt under the supervision of Colonel Elias Dayton of the 3rd New Jersey Regiment on the orders of General Philip Schuyler in the autumn of 1776. It was a wooden and earthen fortress which enclosed the stone church and other buildings located on the highest ground in the village, once known as "Stone Ridge". There also was a blockhouse constructed on the hill overlooking Fort Dayton.

On August 4, 1777, General Nicholas Herkimer assembled about 900 troops of the Tryon County militia at Fort Dayton for their march to support Colonel Peter Gansevoort at Fort Stanwix, which was under siege by Barry St. Leger's British and Indian forces. Herkimer's troops, consisting mainly of Palatine German settlers, followed the north shore of the Mohawk River, and camped the first night west of Sterling (Staring) Creek. On August 6, Herkimer's troops were ambushed in a small ravine by St. Leger's British, Tory, and Indian forces. General Herkimer himself was wounded, but continued to lead his men in what became known as the Battle of Oriskany. General Herkimer died from his wounds on August 17, at his home near the present day Town of Danube.

On February 18, 1779 Henry William Dwight wrote to his brother that 'the people here are scandalously neglected, both with regard to troops and provisions.' He complained of 'no flour and little beef'. (Sedgwick Papers)

Fort Dayton was attacked multiple times including the Attack on German Flatts (1778). Fort Dayton was also a base for soldiers aiding Johann Christian Schell after his stand at Schell's Bush and for pursuing Tory leader Walter Butler and his troops. After the destruction of Fort Stanwix in 1781 it was the westernmost fort in the Mohawk valley, and was besieged by Mohawk leader Joseph Brant in 1782.

== After the war ==
In July 1783 General George Washington toured Fort Dayton, when he was visiting the Mohawk Valley on an inspection tour. The fort was eventually abandoned, and was razed in 1832 to make way for the Erie Canal. A memorial marker of the site of Fort Dayton can be found at the Historic Four Corners intersection on North Main Street in Herkimer.

The 1778 attack and the 1782 siege are represented in the historical novel Drums Along the Mohawk and the 'based upon the book' movie of 1939.

== Archaeology ==
In 2015, the Herkimer County Historical Society (New York State) sponsored a search for the exact location of Fort Dayton. One archaeological excavation in the town of Herkimer revealed pipes and a well, although the investigators believe that none of these artifacts predate the mid-nineteenth century.
