= Fort Herkimer =

Fort located on the southern side of the Mohawk River in central New York

Coordinates: 43°01′01″N 74°57′09″W

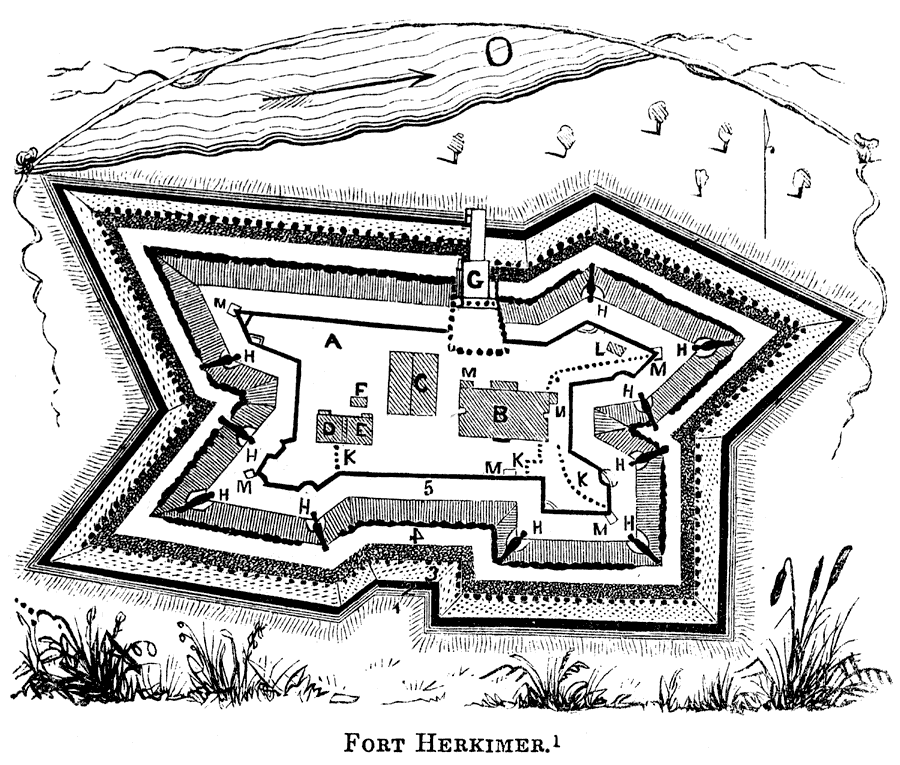
Plan of Fort Herkimer by Benson Lossing (published 1851).

Fort Herkimer was a colonial fort located on the south side of the Mohawk River, opposite the mouth of its tributary West Canada Creek, in German Flatts, New York, United States.

It should not be confused with Fort Dayton, which was located on the north side of the Mohawk River, in what is now Herkimer, New York.

== History ==
The fort was first built in 1740 around the homestead of the Hercheimer (Herkimer) family. In 1757 during the Seven Years' War, young Captain Nicholas Herkimer (later to be a heroic general in the Revolutionary War) had his first military command of colonial forces here when the French attacked German Flatts in 1757 and 1758. It has originally known as Fort Kaouri (Fort Bear).

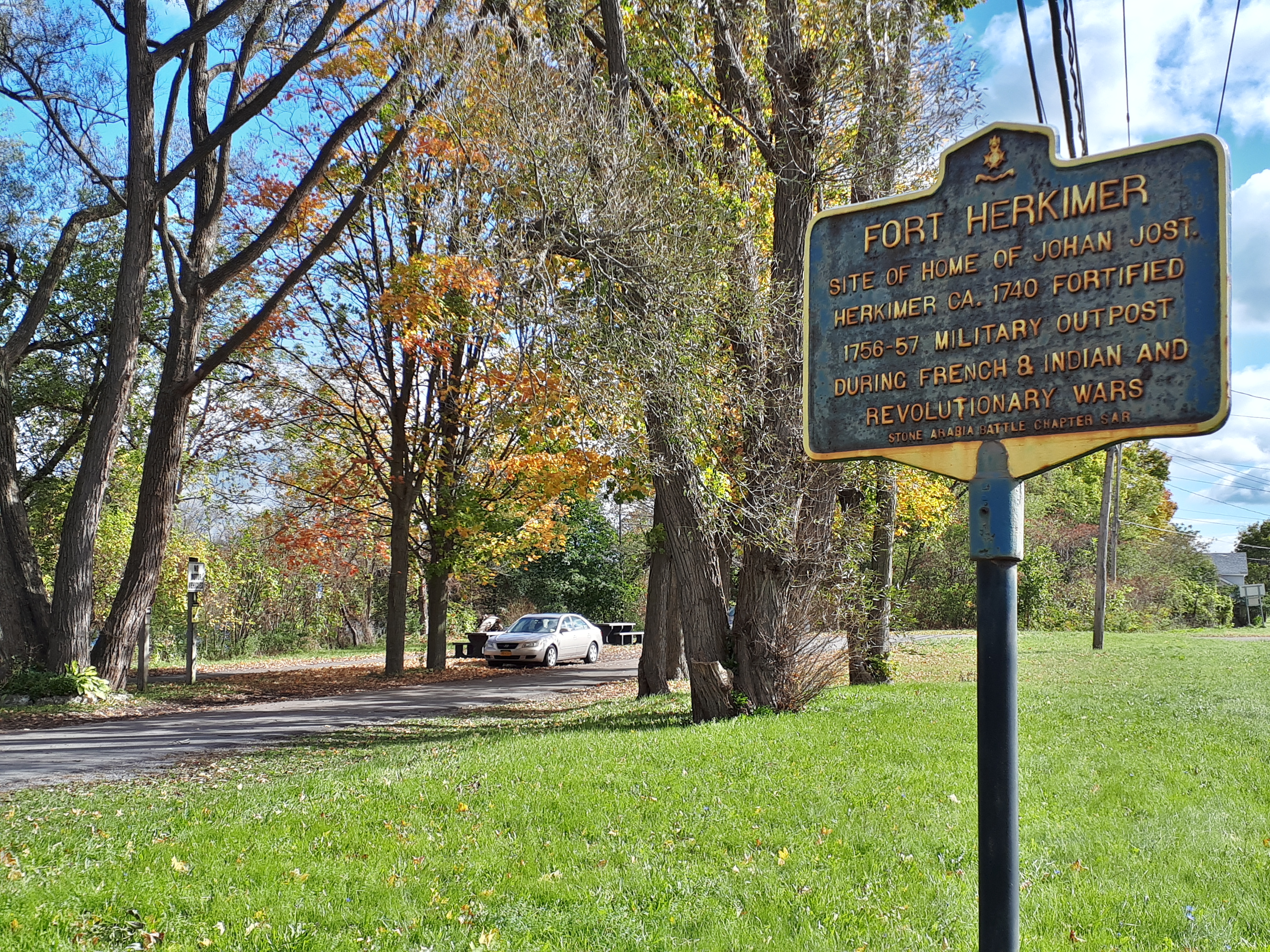
Location of the fort, marked by a plaque, in rest area off NYS-5 S across from Cottonwood Golf Course And Driving Range. Seen circa 2018.

During the American Revolutionary War, settlers rebuilt the fort as a defensive stone stockade around the Fort Herkimer Church. A joint British and Onondaga force attacked German Flatts and the forts on each side of the river in 1778. They captured some of the settlers who were outside the southern fort, including three children of the Demuth family: Catherine, George, and Samuel. After the two older children returned to their family during a prisoner exchange but Samuel, the youngest Demuth captive, had been adopted by the Onondaga and chose to stay with them, as he had become assimilated. He later settled with them on a reservation near Syracuse, from where he kept in touch with his family and acted as an interpreter for the Onondaga and settlers.

Both the old and new forts were destroyed in 1840 during expansion of the Erie Canal, as their stones were used for its construction. The Fort Herkimer Church still stands today. The church belongs to the regional Montgomery Classis of the Reformed Church in America.

The former site of Fort Herkimer is located in the current town of German Flatts, on the south side of the Mohawk River in Herkimer County, New York. Fort Herkimer is sometimes confused with nearby Fort Dayton on the north side of the river, around which the Village of Herkimer developed.
