= Drums Along the Mohawk =

1939 film by John Ford

- DVD release cover
- Directed by: John Ford
- Screenplay by: Sonya Levien; Lamar Trotti
- Based on: Drums Along the Mohawk; 1936 novel by Walter D. Edmonds
- Produced by: Darryl F. Zanuck
- Starring: Claudette Colbert; Henry Fonda; Edna May Oliver; John Carradine; Ward Bond
- Cinematography: Bert Glennon; Ray Rennahan
- Edited by: Robert L. Simpson
- Music by: Alfred Newman
- Color process: Technicolor
- Distributed by: 20th Century Fox
- Release date: November 2, 1939 (Glove Theatre)
- Running time: 104 minutes
- Country: United States
- Language: English
- Budget: over $2 million
- Box office: $1.558 million (U.S. and Canada rentals)

Drums Along the Mohawk is a 1939 American historical western drama film based upon a 1936 novel of the same name by American author Walter D. Edmonds. The film stars Henry Fonda and Claudette Colbert, was produced by Darryl F. Zanuck, and directed by John Ford.

Fonda and Colbert portray a couple who settle on the New York frontier during the American Revolutionary War and defend their farm from Loyalist and Native American attacks before the conflict ends and peace is restored.

Edmonds based the novel on a number of historical figures who lived in the valley. The film—Ford's first Technicolor feature—was well received. It became a major box-office success and was nominated for one Academy Award: Best Supporting Actress (Edna May Oliver).

== Plot ==
Lana Borst, the eldest daughter of a wealthy colonial family, marries Gilbert Martin. Together, they leave her family's luxurious home to embark on a frontier life on Gil's small Deerfield farm situated in the Mohawk Valley of Central New York. In July 1776, after the American Revolutionary War has broken out, the valley's settlers have formed a militia in anticipation of conflict, and Gil enlists in it.

As Gil and his neighbors are clearing land for farming, Blue Back, a friendly Oneida, arrives to warn them that a Seneca raiding party led by a Loyalist named Caldwell is in the valley. The settlers leave their farms and take refuge in nearby Fort Schuyler. Lana, who is pregnant, miscarries during the frantic ride to the fort. Martin's farm is destroyed by the raiding party. With no home and winter approaching, the Martins accept work on the farm of a wealthy widow, Mrs. McKlennar.

During a peaceful interlude, Mrs. McKlennar and the Martins prosper. Then, word comes that a large force of Loyalist troops and Native Americans are approaching the valley. The militia sets out westward to intercept the attackers, but their approach is badly timed and they are ambushed. Though the enemy force is eventually defeated at Oriskany, more than half of the militiamen are killed. Gil returns home, wounded and delirious, but slowly recovers. Lana is again pregnant and delivers a son.

Later, the Loyalists and Native Americans mount a major attack to take the valley, and the settlers again take refuge in the fort. Mrs. McKlennar is mortally wounded and ammunition runs short. Gil makes a heroic dash through enemy lines to secure help from nearby Fort Dayton. Reinforcements arrive just in time to beat back the attackers, who are about to overwhelm the fort. The militia pursues, harasses, and defeats the enemy, scattering them into the wilderness. The Mohawk Valley settlement is saved. Shortly afterward, a regiment arrives at the fort to announce that Lord Cornwallis has surrendered to George Washington at the siege of Yorktown and the war is over. The settlers look forward to their future in the new, independent United States.

== Cast ==
- Claudette Colbert as Magdalena (Note: Spelled in the end credits as Magdalana.) "Lana" Borst Martin
- Henry Fonda as Gilbert "Gil" Martin
- Edna May Oliver as Sarah McKlennar
- Eddie Collins as Christian Reall
- John Carradine as Caldwell
- Dorris Bowdon as Mary Reall
- Ward Bond as Adam Helmer
- Roger Imhof as Gen. Nicholas Herkimer
- Arthur Shields as Rev. Rosenkrantz
- Chief John Big Tree as Blue Back
- Francis Ford as Joe Boleo
- Jessie Ralph as Mrs. Weaver
- Robert Lowery as John Weaver
- Kay Linaker as Mrs. Demooth
- Russell Simpson as Dr. Petry
- Spencer Charters as Innkeeper
- Beulah Hall Jones as Daisy
- Tom Tyler as Capt. Morgan (uncredited)

== Production ==
Parts of the film were shot in Utah, specifically in Duck Creek, Strawberry Valley, Mirror Lake, Navajo Lake, Sidney Valley, and Cedar Breaks National Monument.

The discovery of early drafts of the screenplay reveal the involvement of William Faulkner as author of the original treatment and creator of the film's initial dialogue.

== Historical accuracy ==
Drums Along the Mohawk is loosely based on historical events. A central feature of the plot is the Battle of Oriskany, a pivotal engagement of the Saratoga campaign during the American Revolutionary War, in which a British force drove southward from Canada in an attempt to occupy the Hudson Valley and isolate Connecticut, Rhode Island, New Hampshire, and Massachusetts from the rest of the Thirteen Colonies. A second, smaller force called the St. Leger Expedition, traveled down the St. Lawrence, across Lake Ontario, and marched across the Mohawk Valley heading from the west, and besieged Fort Schuyler, now better known under its original, prewar name of Fort Stanwix.

The Mohawk Valley of upstate New York had been the traditional homeland of the Iroquois Six Nations, a powerful political and military force in the region prior to the American Revolution. Increasingly, white settlers entered the area, with a contingent furthest west of primarily German Palatine origin, who had been largely welcomed by the Mohawks resident there.

Nonetheless, the larger Iroquois Confederacy (that the Mohawks were a part of) was quite concerned about the increasing presence and growing numbers of White settlers in their homeland. Dependent on the White civilization for trade goods and economic opportunities, it was at first eager to try to stay neutral in the conflict between Americans settlers and the British Crown; this proved impossible for several reasons, and the bulk of the Iroquois nations chose sides in the conflict. The Seneca and the Mohawk, led by Joseph Brant, sided with the British, motivated by their traditional good relations with Britain and Sir William Johnson, and Britain's promise to continue to work to reduce American settlement in their homeland. Others, notably the Oneida, sided with the Americans and participated in this conflict on the rebel side throughout the war.

Prior to the arrival of the St. Leger Expedition, the conflict in the region was primarily between local people who wished to remain loyal to the Crown and those who wished to separate from British rule. Locally recruited Loyalist units also participated in the fighting in the region. Troops from the King's Royal Regiment of New York, (also known as Johnson's Royal Greens) and Butler's Rangers, participated in the campaign and fought at the Battle of Oriskany on the side of the Crown with Mohawk and Seneca warriors.

Contrary to its depiction in the film, Fort Schuyler was situated far from any civilian settlements at the site of an important portage of east–west travel through the Mohawk Valley. The fort was besieged by British, Loyalist and Hessian soldiers aided by Seneca and Mohawk warriors, and was defended by Continental Army soldiers from the 3rd New York Regiment and troops from Massachusetts, not militiamen. The Tryon County militia, under General Nicholas Herkimer, aided by Oneida Iroquois, attempted to assist in the fort's defense, but they were ambushed on their way there by a predominantly Mohawk, Seneca, and loyalist force at Oriskany, six miles east of the fort.

Some sources state that attacks on settlements in the Mohawk Valley lacked a historical basis, and were included in the film because Ford felt obliged to perpetuate the mythology. Others contend that countless raids were conducted throughout the war, often by hostile Native Americans allied with loyalists such as Butler's Rangers and the King's Royal Regiment of New York. Among these were the Cherry Valley Massacre, the Battle of Cobleskill, the raid on the Ballston Lake, and others. Such attacks were one motivation for the later Sullivan Expedition and the Battle of Newtown, as Continental forces tried to end this threat. Many of the Loyalists who had been forced to flee to Canada from the valley due to the war believed that attacks on their former neighbors in New York might result in the Mohawk Valley remaining Crown territory as part of Canada. This aspect of the war has been covered by, among others, the writings of Gavin K. Watt, a Canadian historian of Loyalist descent.

The film includes only Loyalists and Native Americans as antagonists; the British are seldom referenced or seen. While Loyalists and local Native American tribes were a factor in the actual Mohawk Valley campaign, their role was a minor one compared to that of the British Army. Ford chose to minimize the British role in the film due to the global political situation in 1939: "He knew that war with Germany was coming, and he had little desire to show the British as villains when they were fighting for their lives against the Nazis."

Correctly portrayed in the film is that the American forces of the Revolutionary War were ethnically and linguistically diverse. The settlers in the Mohawk Valley included many German-speaking Palatines, including Nicholas Herkimer, and many Dutch, including the commander of Fort Schuyler, Peter Gansevoort of the 3rd New York Regiment. Also correctly portrayed was the presence of African-American slaves in the Mohawk Valley as portrayed by Buelah Hall Jones as Daisy, a house servant.

== Location premiere ==
A popular trend in Hollywood at the time was location premieres, wherein communities could apply to be given world-premiere status based on geographic location in films. 40 municipalities applied and 5 were awarded, given their geographic location within the Mohawk Valley. The first one was awarded to Gloversville, New York, where it screened at the Glove Theatre, the flagship venue and headquarters for Schine Enterprise, citing its geographic location of Fort Johnson and Sacandaga. Other locations included Albany, New York, at the Palace Theatre (Albany, New York) wherein NYS Governor Herbert H. Lehman and Mayor John Boyd Thacher II were in attendance with descendants of Colonial Albany; Utica, New York, at the Olympic Theatre; and Amsterdam, New York, at the Rialto Theatre, also operated by Schine Enterprise. Prior to the screening, a street parade took place which included several Native American tribes, The Liberty Boys, and descendants of Douw Fonda.

== Reception ==
Frank S. Nugent reviewed the film for The New York Times of November 4, 1939, and praised the film for its faithfulness to the book and well-balanced acting.

== Awards ==
The film was nominated for an Academy Award for Best Supporting Actress (Edna May Oliver). It was on a preliminary list of submissions from the studios for an Academy Award for Cinematography (Color) but was not nominated.

== Restoration ==
Drums Along the Mohawk was restored by the Academy Film Archive, in conjunction with The Film Foundation, in 2007.

== See also ==
- List of films about the American Revolution
- List of television series and miniseries about the American Revolution
