= Herkimer Home State Historic Site =

- Herkimer House
- U.S. National Register of Historic Places
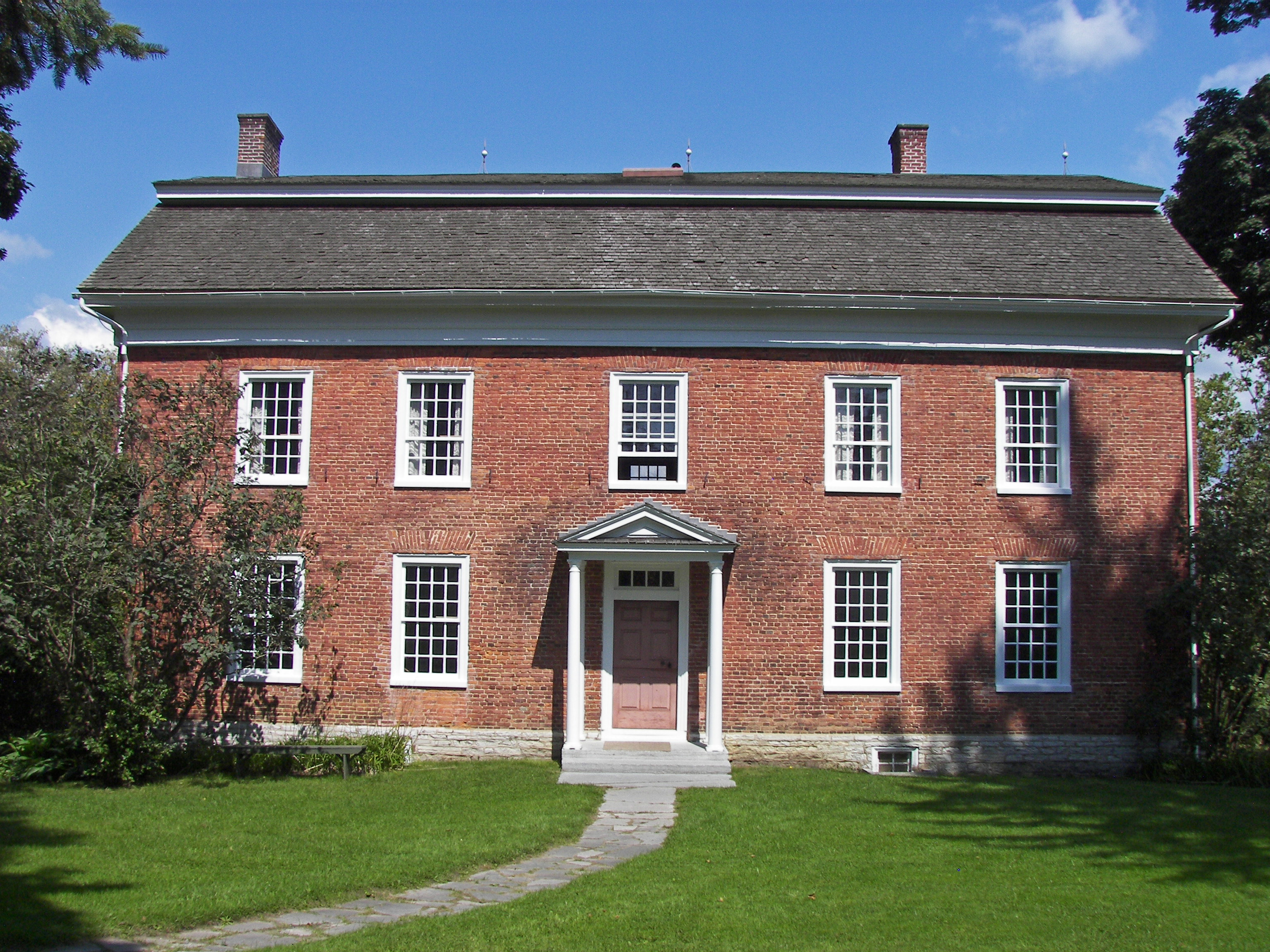
- House of Nicholas Herkimer, 2009

- Location within New York Location within the United States
- Interactive map showing the location of Herkimer House
- Location: Near NY 5 S., Danube, New York
- Coordinates: 43°1′40″N 74°48′52″W
- Area: 160 acres (65 ha)
- Built: 1750
- Architectural style: Georgian
- NRHP reference No.: 71000539
- Added to NRHP: February 12, 1971

Herkimer Home State Historic Site is a historic house museum in Herkimer County, New York, United States. Herkimer Home is in the north part of the Town of Danube, south of the Mohawk River.

The home was built in 1764 by Nicholas Herkimer, who died there in 1777 from wounds suffered in the Battle of Oriskany. He is also buried there. In 1834, the house was owned by Nicholas Herkimer's nephew, John Herkimer.

== Services and activities ==
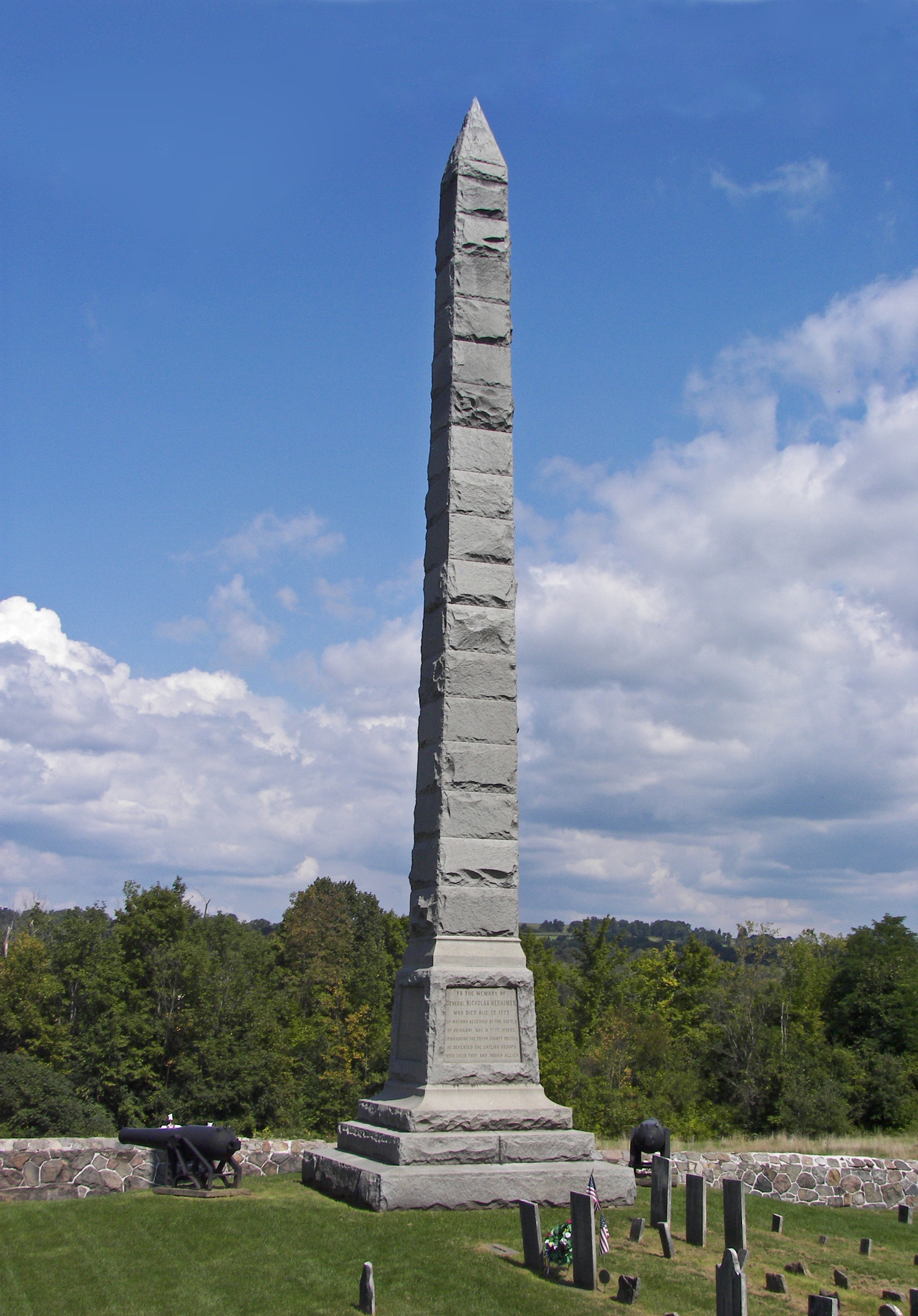
Monument to Nicholas Herkimer in the family's cemetery

The site offers a picnic area, scenic views, a visitor center, guided tours (which are available on Wednesdays to Sundays from Memorial Day to Columbus Day), re-enactments, gardens, and hiking.

The site is assciable through a road located near New York State Thruway exit 29A and via the Empire State Trail.

== Attempted closure ==
In 2010, Democratic Governor David Paterson attempted to close the park due to budget cuts. Opposition to the closure was strong, and the park remained open.

== See also ==
- List of New York State Historic Sites
