= List of New York historic sites =

This is a list of New York (state) historic sites. It includes 40 state-designated historic sites and parks managed by the New York State Office of Parks, Recreation and Historic Preservation. Twenty-two sites also are National Historic Landmarks (NHLs) of the United States and are described further in List of National Historic Landmarks in New York. The 18 SHS that are not NHLs may be of national importance and be NHL-eligible but, as state-owned and -administered sites, may have less need for additional protection; or may be of state, but not national, importance.

	Site name	Image	Date of SHS listing	Region	Location	County	NHL?	Description
1	Bennington Battlefield State Historic Site			Saratoga/Capital District	Walloomsac	Rensselaer	Yes	
2	John Brown Farm State Historic Site			Saratoga/Capital District	North Elba	Essex	Yes	Part of the John Brown Farm and Gravesite NHL
3	John Burroughs Memorial State Historic Site			Central	Roxbury	Delaware	Yes	Part of the Woodchuck Lodge NHL
4	Caumsett State Historic Park			Long Island	Lloyd Harbor	Suffolk	No	Estate home of Marshall Field III. Park includes a formally designated bird conservation area.
5	Clermont State Historic Site			Taconic	Clermont	Columbia	Yes	Part of the Clermont Manor NHL.
6	Clinton House State Historic Site			Taconic	Poughkeepsie	Dutchess	No	
7	Crailo State Historic Site			Saratoga/Capital District	Rensselaer	Rensselaer	Yes	Part of the Fort Crailo NHL.
8	Old Croton Aqueduct State Historic Park			Taconic		Westchester	Yes	
9	Crown Point State Historic Site			Satatoga/Capital District	Crown Point	Essex	Yes	Part of Fort Crown Point NHL and Fort Frederic NHL
10	Old Erie Canal State Historic Park	The Old Erie Canal and its towpath at Kirkville, New York, within Old Erie Canal State Historic Park.		Central		Madison, Oneida, Onondaga	No	A 36-mile (58 km) linear park on the Long Level section of the original Erie Canal, between DeWitt and Rome
11	Ganondagan State Historic Site			Finger Lakes	Victor	Ontario	Yes	Part of the Boughton Hill NHL
12	Grant Cottage State Historic Site			Saratoga/Capital District	Wilton	Saratoga	No	
13	Guy Park State Historic Site			Saratoga/Capital District	Amsterdam	Montgomery	No	Closed to the public in 2011 due to flood damage from Hurricane Irene.
14	Herkimer Home State Historic Site			Central	Danube	Herkimer	No	
15	Hyde Hall State Historic Site			Central	Springfield	Otsego	Yes	
16	Jay Estate			Taconic	Rye	Westchester	Yes	Part of the Boston Post Road Historic District
17	John Jay Homestead State Historic Site			Taconic	Katonah	Westchester	Yes	Part of the John Jay House NHL
18	Johnson Hall State Historic Site			Saratoga/Capital District	Johnstown	Fulton	Yes	
19	Knox's Headquarters State Historic Site			Palisades	New Windsor	Orange	Yes	
20	Lorenzo State Historic Site			Central	Cazenovia	Madison	No	
21	Darwin Martin House State Historic Site			Niagara	Buffalo	Erie	Yes	
22	Fort Montgomery State Historic Site			Palisades	Fort Montgomery	Orange	Yes	
23	Old Fort Niagara State Historic Site			Niagara	Youngstown	Niagara	Yes	Part of the Colonial Niagara NHL
24	New Windsor Cantonment State Historic Site			Palisades	Vails Gate	Orange	No	
25	Olana State Historic Site			Taconic	Greenport	Columbia	Yes	Part of the Frederic Church House NHL
26	Fort Ontario State Historic Site			Central	Oswego	Oswego	No	Fort held by the British until 1796; previous forts on site burned by Indians or Americans; only U.S. refuge of Jewish refugees during World War II
27	Oriskany Battlefield State Historic Site			Central	Oriskany	Oneida	Yes	
28	Philipse Manor State Historic Site			Taconic	Yonkers	Westchester	Yes	
29	Planting Fields Arboretum State Historic Park			Long Island	Oyster Bay	Nassau	No	
30	National Purple Heart Hall of Honor			Palisades	New Windsor	Orange	No	
31	Sackets Harbor Battlefield State Historic Site			Thousand Islands	Sackets Harbor	Jefferson	No	
32	Schoharie Crossing State Historic Site			Saratoga/Capital District	Glen	Montgomery	Yes	Part of the Erie Canal NHL
33	Schuyler Mansion State Historic Site			Saratoga/Capital District	Albany	Albany	Yes	
34	Senate House State Historic Site			Palisades	Kingston	Ulster	No	
35	Sonnenberg Gardens & Mansion State Historic Park			Finger Lakes	Canandaigua	Ontario	No	
36	Staatsburgh State Historic Site			Taconic	Staatsburg	Dutchess	No	Site includes a bird conservation area.
37	Steuben Memorial State Historic Site			Central	Steuben	Oneida	No	
38	Stony Point Battlefield State Historic Site			Palisades	Stony Point	Rockland	Yes	
39	Walt Whitman Birthplace State Historic Site			Long Island	Huntington Station	Suffolk	No	
40	Washington's Headquarters State Historic Site			Palisades	Newburgh	Orange	Yes	

== See also ==
- New York State Register of Historic Places
- Erie Canalway National Heritage Corridor
- Great Camps
- List of National Historic Landmarks in New York
- List of New York state parks
- National Register of Historic Places listings in New York
- New York State Canalway Trail
