= Louis Cook =

Haudenosaunee leader and commissioned officer in the Continental Army

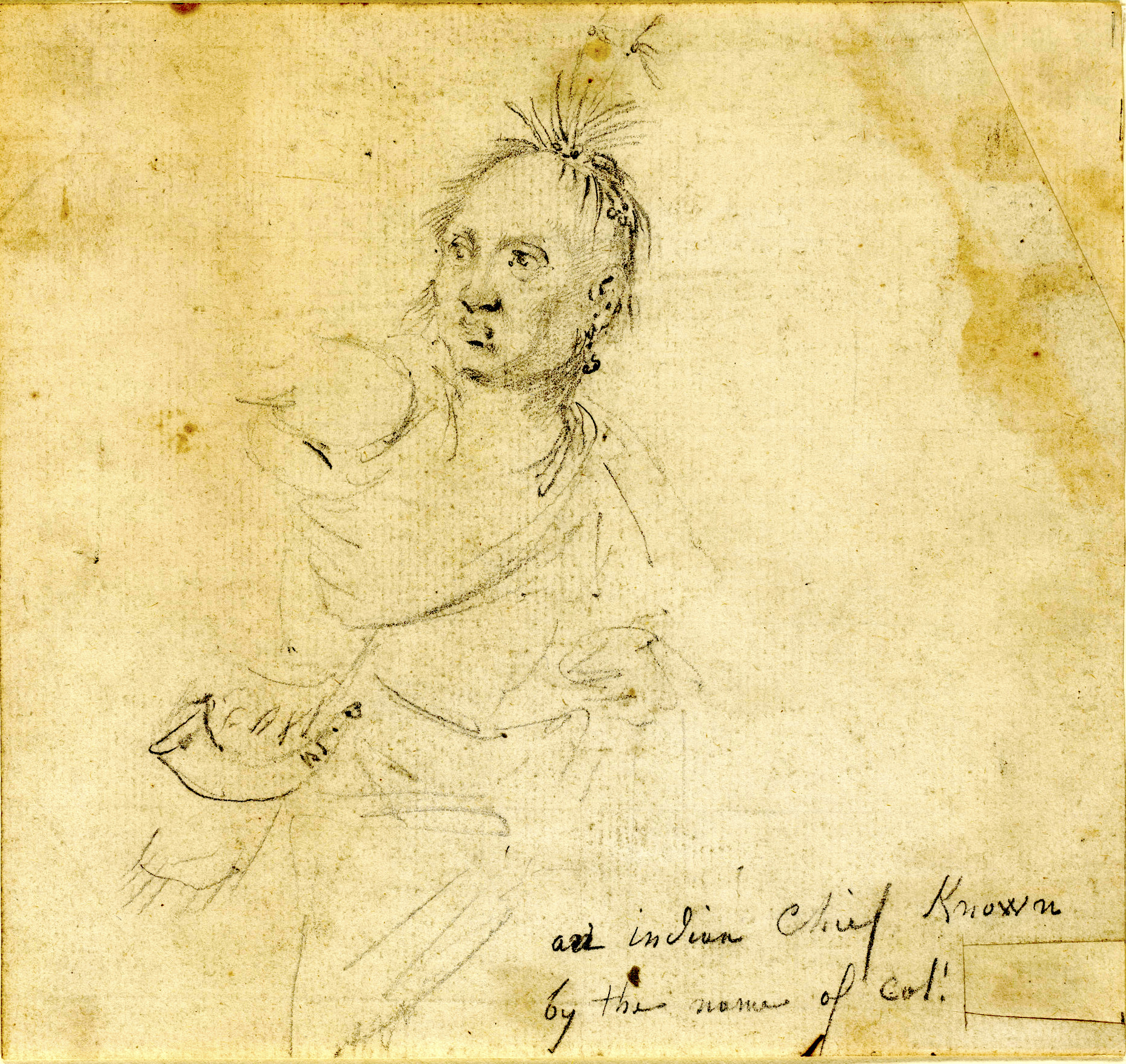
Colonel Louis of the Oneidas. John Trumbull sketched this pencil drawing in 1785.

Louis Cook (Mohawk: Akiatonharónkwen, also transliterated as Atiatoharongwen; died October 1814) was a Mohawk Haudenosaunee leader and commissioned officer in the Continental Army during the American Revolution. Born to an African father and an Abenaki mother in what is now Schuylerville, New York, he and his mother were taken captive in a French-Mohawk raid and taken to Kahnawà:ke, a Mohawk village south of Montreal. They were adopted by a Mohawk family. His mother soon died and he served Catholic missionaries, learning French. He became an influential leader among the Mohawk and distinguished himself as a warrior for their allies the French during the French and Indian War.

During the American Revolutionary War, Cook supported the American colonists and joined their fight against the British. He became the highest-ranking Native American officer in the Continental Army, achieving the rank of lieutenant colonel. He led Oneida warriors, who were allied with the rebels, against the British in some actions. When the Americans sought Native American allies in the Revolutionary War, they looked to form an alliance with some of the Haudenosaunee. It was known that the British wanted Native allies in their ranks too so failure to add allies would surely push them into the ranks of the British.

After the war, he settled in central New York State, where he became an important adviser to the Oneida. He represented them and the Seven Nations of Canada to negotiate with the government of New York state in trying to achieve more justice in postwar land deals. He later settled at Ahkwesáhsne, eventually a formal Mohawk reserve that straddles the New York, US-Quebec, Canada borders.

== Early life and education ==
Cook was born as Nia-man-rigounant to an Abenaki mother and Black father. While living in what is today Schuylerville, New York, the family was taken captive in a French-Mohawk raid in 1745. A French officer planned to enslave him as a child, but the Mohawk intervened and saved him. They took the boy and his mother with them when they returned to their village of Kahnawà:ke south of Montreal. Cook was formally adopted by a Mohawk family and assimilated into the tribe; he grew up learning their culture and language. In the Mohawk language, he was named Akiatonharónkwen, which translates as "he unhangs himself from the group." Over the years, Cook also learned French, as he was educated by Jesuit Catholic missionaries in the village.

Later he learned English as well. Among English-language records, he is most often referred to as Louis Cook or Colonel Louis. He is sometimes referred to as Joseph Louis Cook or Joseph Lewis.

== French and Indian War ==
Cook lived in the Mohawk village of Kahnawà:ke. He fought with the Mohawk nation on the side of the French against the British in the French and Indian War, the North American front of the Seven Years' War. A friend and minister, Eleazer Williams, later wrote that Cook was at the battle against the Braddock expedition in 1755 (the Braddock party included the young George Washington), and served under General Montcalm at the Battle of Fort Oswego in 1756. The same year, he was wounded in a skirmish with Rogers' Rangers near Fort Ticonderoga.

Cook was given his first command in the 1758 Battle of Carillon, where he was praised by General Montcalm. He was also present at the Battle of Sainte-Foy in 1760, serving under the Chevalier de Levis.

Following the war, Cook returned to Caughnawaga (Kahnawà:ke) and married Marie-Charlotte. As he never fully accepted the British victory and found his homeland increasingly overrun by American colonists, he moved with his family to Ahkwesáhsne, a Mohawk village along the St. Lawrence River in what was then Quebec.

== American Revolution ==
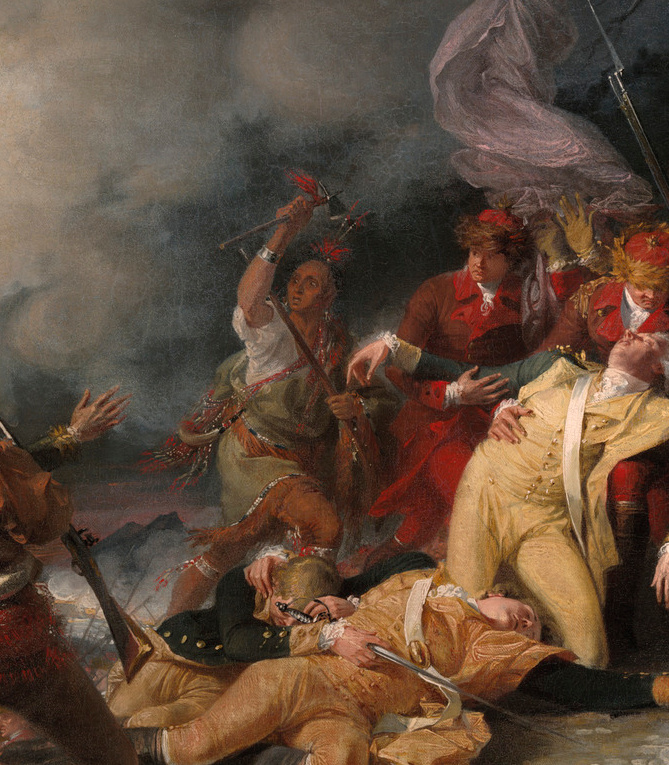
Colonel Louis defiantly raises his Tomahawk in The Death of General Montgomery in the Attack on Quebec, December 31, 1775 by John Trumbull

Although the Mohawk and three other Haudenosaunee nations sided with the British during the American Revolution, hoping to expel the colonists from their lands, Cook allied with the Thirteen Colonies, as did the Oneida and Tuscarora. As early as 1775, he offered his services to General George Washington. Cook returned in January 1776 with a group to meet with Philip Schuyler in Albany and with Washington and John Adams in Cambridge, Massachusetts. Cook was with Benedict Arnold on his expedition into Quebec, when he was already known as "Colonel Louis." Washington met again with Cook in 1776.

John Adams who met with him in Cambridge said Colonel Louis "spoke English and French as well as Indian.”[1] Louis Cook was present at the siege at Fort Stanwix which resulted in a Patriot Victory. A story that illustrates Cook’s fierceness as a fighter was that "Louis Atayutaghranghta noticed that an enemy Indian was a crack shot. When the warrior next rose to take aim, Louis fired. That fell will do no more harm,”[1] declared Louis, who proceeded to take the dead man’s scalp. General Washington even referred to Colonel Louis as "our friend." General Washington was also relieved to hear that Colonel Louis had "returned safely from a mission."

In New York, Louis Cook was present at the Battle of Oriskany, and participated in the Saratoga Campaign. He led a large body of Oneida and Tuscarora warriors under General Robert Van Rensselaer. Following the Battle of Klock's Field, Cook forded a river in pursuit of Sir John Johnson while General Rensselaer delayed. Infuriated, Colonel Louis shook his sword at Rensselaer and accused him of being a Tory.

Cook was with the Continental Army at Valley Forge in the winter of 1777. In spring 1778, Peter Stephen DuPonceau wrote of meeting Cook, dressed in American regimentals, after hearing the officer singing a French aria. In March of that year, General Philip Schuyler sent Cook to destroy British ships at Niagara in order to prevent another Canadian expedition.

The nickname of "Colonel Louis" was made fact on June 15, 1779, when Cook received a commission from the Continental Congress as a lieutenant colonel in the Continental Army. This commission was the highest rank awarded to an American Indian during the Revolution. It is the only known Continental Army commission given to a man of known African descent. Colonel Louis led a Native American delegation to greet General Rochambeau in 1780, where some officers noted he spoke French with no discernible accent. Louis was with Lieutenant-Colonel Marinus Willett at the Battle of Johnstown in 1781, one of the last North American battles of the Revolution.

During the war, Cook became a personal enemy of Captain Joseph Brant, a Mohawk who supported the British. When each returned to their homes after the war, their personal conflict divided the Mohawk nation. The Seven Nations of Canada and the Haudenosaunee at what would be the Six Nations Reserve, who were mostly emigrants from the New York colony, were brought to the brink of war.

== Later life ==
Cook settled in the area of Sterling, New York following the war. He became an influential adviser to the Oneida tribe because he could speak both French and English in addition to Oneida. While living at Onondaga, Cook married Marguerite Thewanihattha. They had several children.

Cook convinced the Oneida to lease their lands, using the example of the Mohawk tribe at Kahnawà:ke. The Oneida leased nearly 5 million acres (20,000 km^{2}) to Colonel John Livingston for 999 years. Conflicting claims were made on many of the Haudenosaunee lands, and much of the land was lost to the state of New York because the Haudenosaunee were forced to cede land, as the majority had been allies of the defeated British.

The Oneida named Cook and Peter Otsequette to negotiate with Governor George Clinton for a return of, or compensation for, their land. Governor Clinton made some minor concessions to the Oneida in the Treaty of Fort Schuyler, but generally did not yield much to the Oneida representatives. Today, Cook has been criticized for negotiating bad land deals for the Oneida.

Despite his shortcomings in the Oneida land negotiations, between 1792 and 1796 Cook was selected by the Seven Nations of Canada on six occasions to represent them in land negotiations with New York state. The negotiations were related to lands sold by the people of two villages, Grand River and Tyendinaga Mohawk Territory, Ontario, who were led by Joseph Brant. The Mohawk peoples of Ahkwesáhsne and Kahnawà:ke, then considered two of the Seven Nations, denied that those villages had the right to sell what was common Mohawk land in New York. Ultimately, New York prevailed in keeping control of the land, and the division between Cook and Brant was deepened.

By 1789, Cook had settled at Ahkwesáhsne, where he became an influential chief. The Mohawk reserve eventually established there spans the New York (US)-Quebec (Canada) border and the St. Lawrence River. He argued that the St. Regis Indians (as they were called in New York) and the Seven Nations should remain neutral in the War of 1812 between the US and Great Britain. The United States forgot Cook's earlier service and detained the Mohawk at Fort Niagara; he was released after producing proof of his commission in the Continental Army, as well as letters from George Washington.

Although too elderly to participate in the War of 1812, Cook followed the United States Army into Canada during the war; he was present at the Battle of Lundy's Lane. He was involved in a skirmish and fell from his horse. The injuries proved fatal; he died in the American camp in October 1814. Cook was given a military salute at his funeral, and was buried near Buffalo, New York.
