= Drums Along the Mohawk (novel) =

1936 book by Walter Edmonds

- Author: Walter D. Edmonds
- Language: English
- Genre: Historical
- Publication date: 1936
- Publication place: United States
- Media type: Print

Drums Along the Mohawk (1936) is a novel by American author Walter D. Edmonds. The story follows the lives of fictional Gil and Lana Martin, settlers in the central Mohawk Valley of the New York frontier during the American Revolutionary War (1775–1783). Frank Bergmann wrote in 2005 that the novel, "as a best-seller and a novel perennially assigned in the state's high schools, has substantially shaped the popular view of the region's pioneer period."

The book is peopled with historical persons such as General Nicholas Herkimer, Adam Helmer, descendants of the German immigrants who were the majority residents in the central Mohawk Valley at the time, and William Caldwell. It also features such historical events as the Battle of Oriskany and the Attack on German Flatts (1778). Edmonds justifies his approach to historical accuracy in the preface:

A novelist has, if he chooses, a greater opportunity for the faithful presentation of a bygone time than an historian; for the historian is compelled to a presentation of cause and effect, and feels, as a rule, that he must present them through the lives and characters of 'famous’ or 'historical' figures. My concern, however, has been with life as it was, as you or I, our mothers or wives, our brothers and husbands and uncles might have experienced it.

The novel was a commercial and popular success, remaining on the bestseller list for two years.

In 1939, the book was adapted for a Technicolor feature film of the same name directed by John Ford and starring Henry Fonda, Claudette Colbert, Edna May Oliver, Ward Bond, and John Carradine. Historian Edward Countryman has argued that, while the film incorporates characters, plot, and dialogue from the novel, it differs profoundly in its portrayal of society in the period of the American Revolution. He (Ford) made it a mythic triumph of the American cause, rather than suggesting the complexity of the times as had Edmonds. Similarly, Frank Bergmann has written, "Unfortunately the 1939 film directed by John Ford, starring Henry Fonda and Claudette Colbert, abandons the historical complexity of the original for the mythic simplification of an all-American Western."

The Bantam Books edition had gone through no less than 48 printings between July 1936 and August 1956. The novel is still in print after eight decades.
