= Fort Herkimer Church =

Historic church in New York, United States

- U.S. National Register of Historic Places
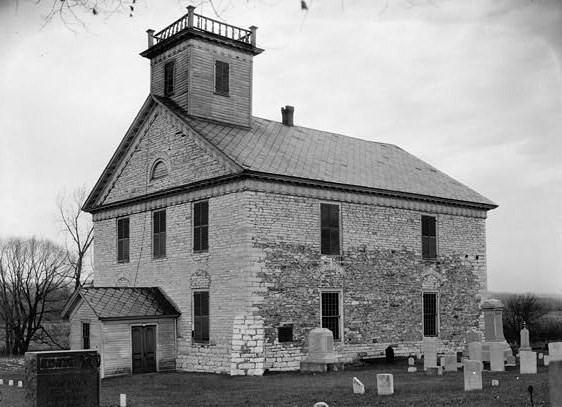

- Location within New York Location within the United States
- Location: 575 Route 5-S, East Herkimer, New York
- Coordinates: 43°1′5″N 74°57′16″W
- Area: less than one acre
- Built: 1767
- Architect: Multiple
- NRHP reference No.: 72000843
- Added to NRHP: July 24, 1972

Fort Herkimer Church, also known as the Reformed Protestant Dutch Church of German Flatts, is a historic church located in East Herkimer, Herkimer County, New York. It was built in 1767, and expanded in 1812. It is a two-story, rectangular grey limestone building. The gable roof is topped by a frame cupola.

It was added to the National Register of Historic Places in 1972.

Interior of Fort Herkimer Church

Exterior of Fort Herkimer Church
