= Tryon County Committee of Safety =

Prior to the American Revolution, the colonies formed Committees of Safety to represent the interests of their respective communities. They determined the judicial outcome of civil cases, organized the local militia, arrested and tried those suspected of criminal or subversive activities.

== New York ==
The Tryon County, New York Committee of Safety was formed on August 27, 1774, and was an extra-legal body and the de facto government of the county until 1778. Its first chairman was Christopher Yates. The committee ordered that no person should come into or go out of the county without a pass from some acknowledged public body; and was authorized to arrest "suspicious" people, some of whom they fined, while they imprisoned others.

In August, 1774, they drafted a document protesting the British naval blockade of Boston harbor. They held 16 of their 31 meetings in the home of Goshen Van Alstyne, in Canajoharie, New York.

The New York Provincial Congress convened in May, 1775. On June 11, 1775, Yates, John Marlett and John Moore were appointed deputies for Tryon County.

=== Wartime activity ===
In January, 1776, Isaac Paris, Chairman of the Committee of Safety, sent a letter to General Schuyler that six or seven hundred Loyalists had gathered and were under arms at Johnstown. In May 1776, the committee instructed its representatives in the New York Provincial Congress to vote for independence.

At the Battle of Oriskany, Samuel Billington, John Dygert, and Jacob Snell (members of the committee) were killed. After this battle, radicals led by Paris and Moses Younglove controlled the committee. The radicals continued to imprison suspected Loyalists. They imprisoned Peter Bellinger and other Patriots who refused to sell wheat to the committee at a price below market value. They group encouraged Oneida Indians to attack and burn the homes of suspected Loyalists. Another member of the committee at this time was Colonel Sampson Sammons.

In March 1778, General Schuyler warned the committee to stop, but by then most of the Loyalists had fled. The authority of the Committee of Safety was superseded by the New York state legislature on February 7, 1778.

In March 1778, Paris was elected to the New York Assembly. In the spring, the state legislature abolished all committees in New York in favor of "Commissioners of Conspiracy," which were appointed by the governor. The committee of safety last met on April 21, 1778.

== North Carolina ==
Tryon County, North Carolina, played an important role in the American Revolution.

Following the Battle of Lexington in Massachusetts, 49 county residents gathered at the courthouse and issued the Tryon Resolves, a declaration of resistance to coercive actions by the British Empire against its North American colonies. On August 14, 1775, the signers of "The Resolves," all members of the Tryon County, North Carolina Committee of Safety, formed the Tryon County, North Carolina militia in preparation for British retaliation against the growing American resistance.

== Notes ==
- The minute book of the Committee of Safety of Tryon County, 1905
