= Mohawk Valley =

Coordinates: 42°45′39.28″N 73°41′13.43″W

- Six-county region
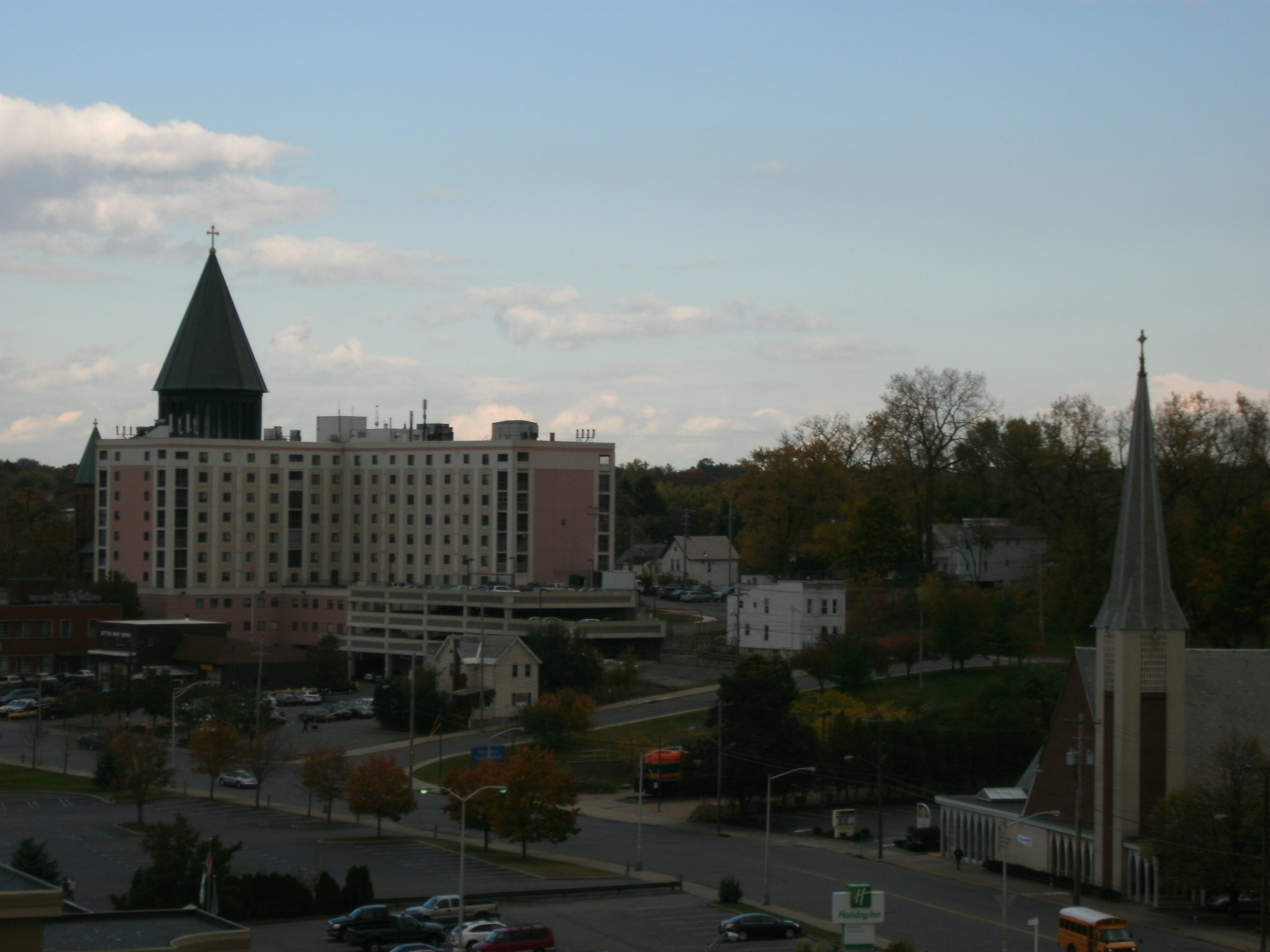
Schenectady
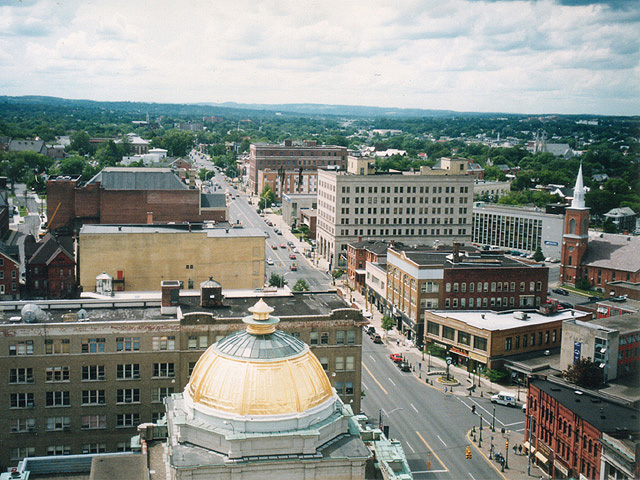
Utica
- Interactive map of Mohawk Valley
- Country: United States
- State: New York
- Major cities: List: Schenectady; Utica; Rome; Little Falls; Amsterdam; Johnstown; Gloversville; Oneonta; Saratoga Springs; Mechanicville; Albany; Watervliet; Cohoes

Area
  - Metro: 6,984 sq mi (18,088 km^{2})
- Highest elevation at: 4,360 ft (1,330 m)
- Lowest elevation at: −10 ft (−3.0 m)
  - Density: 1,065/sq mi (411/km^{2})
- Time zone: UTC−5 (Eastern)
  - Summer (DST): UTC−4 (PDT)

Shaded relief map of New York. The Mohawk Valley is demarked by the green lowlands running east-west across the middle of the state.

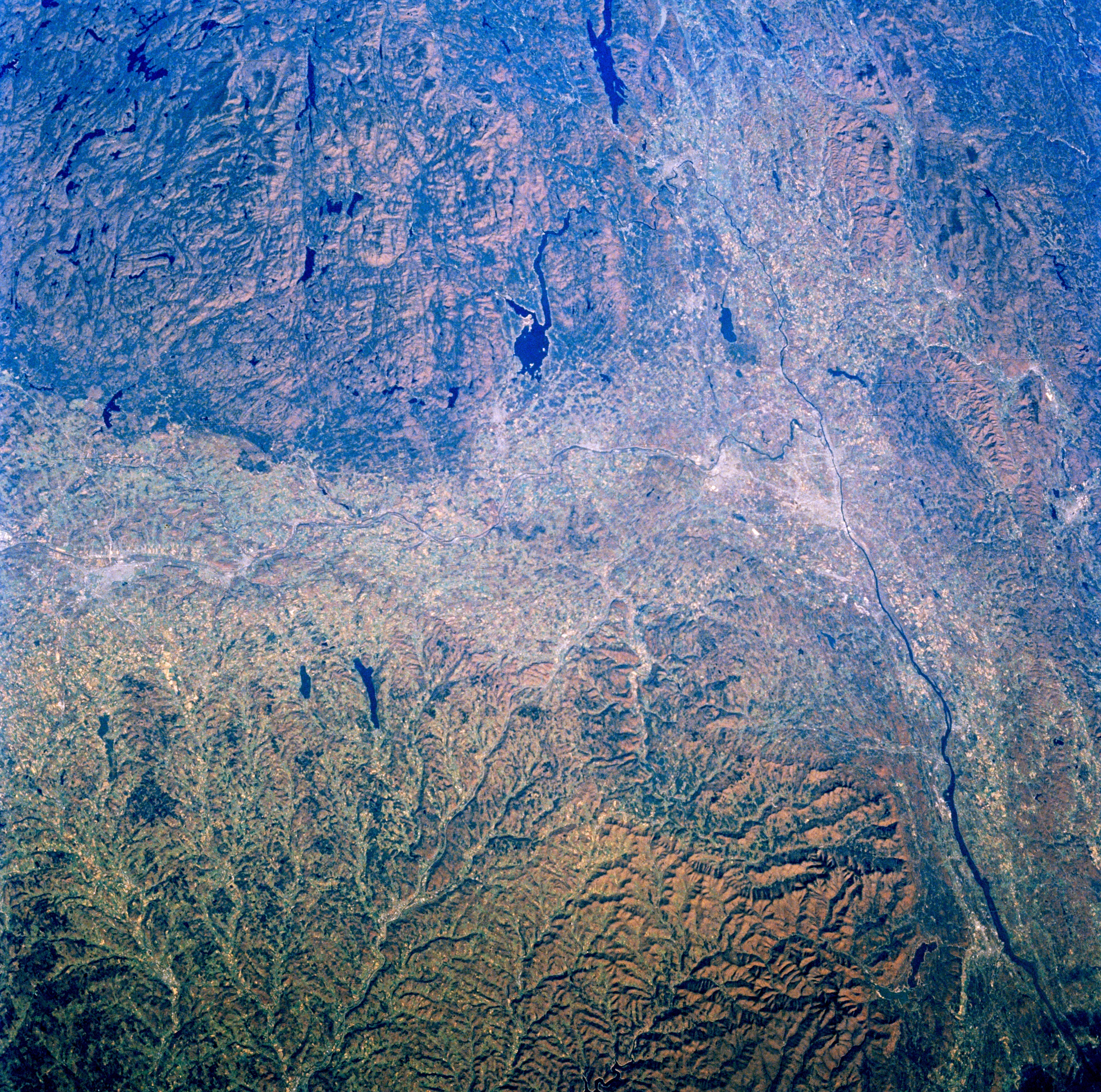
Image of the Mohawk and Hudson valleys from Space Shuttle Challenger.

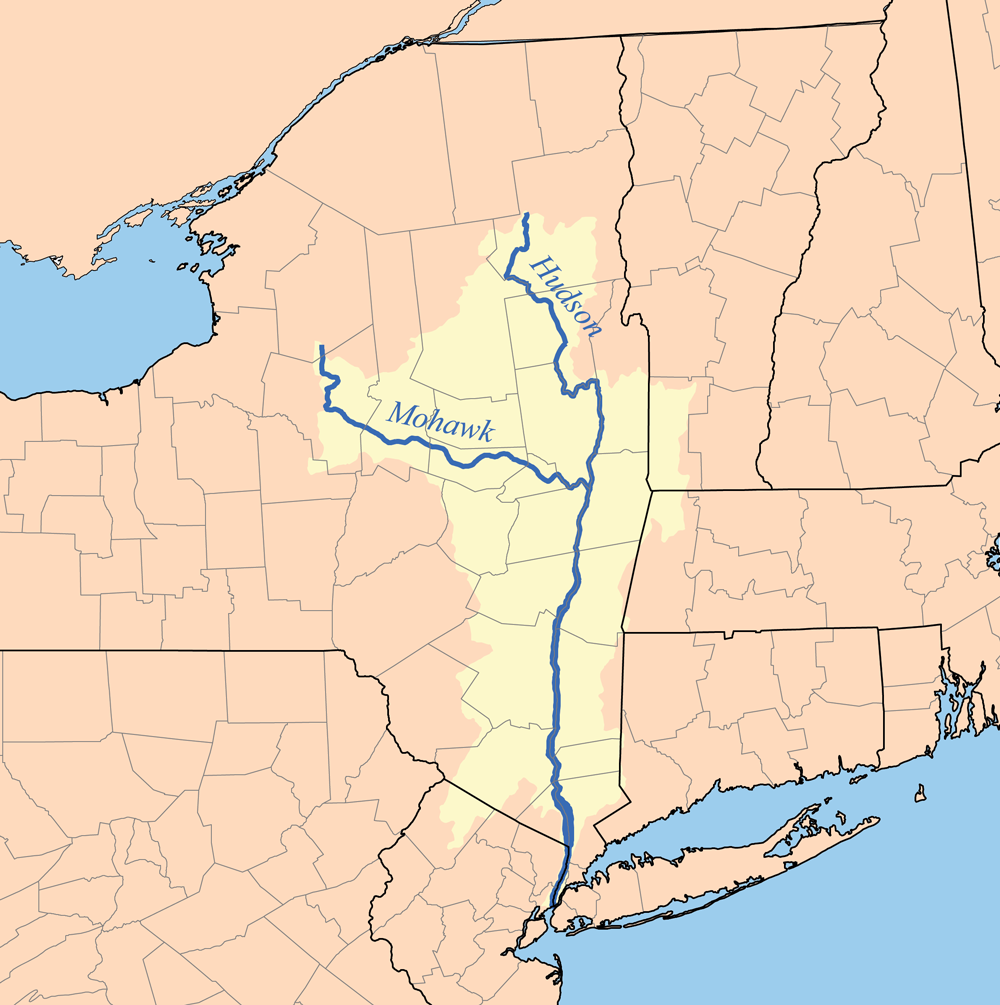
The Mohawk Valley abuts the Hudson Valley

The Mohawk Valley of the U.S. state of New York is the area surrounding the Mohawk River, sandwiched between the Adirondack Mountains and Catskill Mountains, northwest of the Capital District. As of the 2010 United States Census, the region's counties have a combined population of 622,133 people. In addition to the Mohawk River valley, the region contains portions of other major watersheds such as the Susquehanna River.

The region is a suburban and rural area surrounding the industrialized cities of Schenectady, Utica and Rome, along with other smaller commercial centers. The 5,882 square miles (15,230 km^{2}) area is an important agricultural center and encompasses the heavily forested wilderness areas just to the north that are part of New York's Adirondack Park.

The Mohawk Valley is part of a natural passageway connecting the Atlantic Ocean, by way of the Hudson Valley, with the interior of North America. Native American Nations of the Haudenosaunee Confederacy lived in the region. In the 17th century, Dutch, French and English immigrants —and in the 18th century German, Irish and Scottish—settled the area. Following the rapid industrialization of the mid-19th century, Italian and Welsh people settled in the valley.

During the 18th Century, the Mohawk Valley was a frontier of great political, military, and economic importance. Colonists— such as Phillip Schuyler, Nicholas Herkimer, William Johnson—trading with the Haudenosaunee set the stage for commercial and military competition between European nations, leading to the French and Indian Wars and the American Revolution. Almost 100 battles of the American Revolution were fought in New York State, including the Battle of Oriskany, Battle of Saratoga and defense of Fort Stanwix. During the war, a series of raids against valley residents took place led by John Johnson. These raids were collectively known as the "Burning of the Valleys".

In 1825, the Erie Canal was completed as the first commercial connection between the American East and West.

== Strategic importance ==
During the French and Indian War, the Mohawk River Valley was of prime strategic importance; to the British, it provided a corridor to the Great Lakes from which to threaten New France directly, while to the French it provided a corridor to the Hudson Valley and on to the heart of British North America. In addition, many settlements of the Mohawk, Britain's crucial Indian ally at the time of the war, were located in or near the valley.

At the beginning of the war, the major British stronghold in the Mohawk corridor was Fort Oswego, located on Lake Ontario. The French captured and destroyed the fort after a short siege in 1756, and the Mohawk Valley lay open to French advance as a result. Although the French did not directly exploit this avenue of attack, its impact swayed some of the Haudenosaunee to the French side.

== Original inhabitants ==
The original inhabitants of the Mohawk Valley can be traced back 10,000 plus years and included Algonquian people that later relocated from the newly established Fort Orange Dutch trading post region as early as 1624, as the name implies, the inhabitants were and remained Mohawks. The name Mohawk Valley has its origins in the years 1614 and 1624-25 following the settlement by Dutch traders who established a trading post in the Valley, the Mohawk tribe became alliances and targets during the Indian Wars. The Mohawks of Mohawk Valley call themselves Kanien'keha'ka, and "People of the Flint" in part due to their creation story of a powerful flinted arrow. Among other things, the traditional use of Mohawk Valley flint as Toolmaking Flint is only one attribution to the Mohawk Valley People of the Flint name.

== Counties ==
- Schoharie
- Montgomery
- Fulton
- Herkimer
- Oneida
- Otsego

Schoharie County is sometimes considered to be part of the Mohawk Valley because the Schoharie Creek, primarily located in Schoharie County, is a major tributary that empties into the Mohawk River at Fort Hunter in Montgomery County. Furthermore, the northern border of Schoharie County with Montgomery County is very close to the Mohawk River.

Schenectady, Albany, and Saratoga counties are also sometimes considered to be part of the Mohawk Valley because the Mohawk River Flows through those 3 counties, the Mohawk River also ends at the Hudson River where Albany, Saratoga, and Rensselaer counties meet as a delta.

Schoharie, Montgomery, Fulton, Saratoga, Schenectady, and Albany counties are the only 6 counties within the Mohawk Valley to be part of the Capital District, Albany County is also considered part of the Hudson Valley.

=== Major cities, towns, and villages ===
Montgomery County

- Amsterdam
- Canajoharie
- Fonda
- Fort Plain
- Fultonville
- Nelliston
- Palatine Bridge
- St. Johnsville

Fulton County

- Gloversville
- Johnstown

Herkimer County

- Frankfort
- Herkimer
- Ilion
- Little Falls
- Mohawk

Oneida County

- Sherrill
- Rome
- Utica
- New Hartford

Otsego County

- Cooperstown
- Oneonta

Schoharie County

- Middleburgh
- Schoharie
- Cobleskill

Schenectady County

- Schenectady
- Rotterdam
- Niskayuna
- Glenville
- Scotia

Saratoga County

- Saratoga Springs
- Mechanicville
- Ballston Spa
- Waterford
- Clifton Park
- Halfmoon
- Stillwater
- Malta
- Schuylerville
- Wilton
- South Glens Falls
- Corinth

Albany County

- Albany
- Cohoes
- Watervliet
- Colonie
- Menands
- Green Island
- Voorheesville
- Guilderland
- Bethlehem
- Ravena

== Popular culture ==
- Drums Along the Mohawk (1936), an historical novel written by Walter D. Edmonds, is set in the Mohawk Valley near Deerfield during the American Revolutionary War. It was very carefully researched and portrayed the complexity of the times. The 1939 film of the same name, directed by John Ford, has been criticized for “[abandoning] the historical complexity of the original for the mythic simplification of an all-American Western.”
- The Mohawk Valley is an important site in the video game Assassin's Creed III published by Ubisoft. The game takes place during the Revolutionary War era and features an assassin tasked with playing a role in the history of early America.

== See also ==
- Mohawk Valley formula
- Dean R. Snow — archeologist who has conducted numerous excavations along the valley, providing valuable historical information about indigenous peoples and colonial America.

== Sources ==
- Thematic Survey of Dutch Heritage Resources in the Greater Hudson Valley
- Burning of the Valleys Military Association
- Fort Johnson in the Mohawk Valley
- Mohawk Valley Heritage Corridor Commission
- FortPlank.com
