= Nicholas Herkimer =

American militia officer (1728–1777)

- Herkimer (pointing) at the Battle of Oriskany
- Born: c. 1728; German Flatts, New York
- Died: August 16, 1777 (aged 48–49); German Flatts, New York
- Military career
- Allegiance: New York (1758); United Colonies (1775–1776); United States (1775–1777)
- Branch: New York Militia
- Rank: Brigadier general
- Conflicts: French and Indian War; Attack on German Flatts; American Revolutionary War; Battle of Oriskany (DOW)

Brigadier General Nicholas Herkimer (also known as Nikolaus Herchheimer; c. 1728 – August 16, 1777) was an American militia officer who served in the French and Indian War and American Revolutionary War. A brigadier general in the New York Militia during the Revolutionary War, he died from wounds suffered during the Battle of Oriskany.

== Early life ==
Herkimer was born in the vicinity of German Flatts in the Mohawk Valley of the Province of New York, the eldest of five sons of Catherine Petri and Johann Jost Herchheimer. He was the elder brother of Loyalist officer Johan Jost Herkimer. His grandfather was Palatine immigrant Georg Herchheimer or Hirchemer from Sandhausen in the parish of Leimen south of Heidelberg. Nicholas was of slender build, with a dark complexion and black hair; he was not quite six feet tall. He could speak German, English and Mohawk.

== Career ==
During the 1757 attack on German Flatts in the French and Indian War, he was involved in its defense. He was made a captain in the New York Militia on January 5, 1758, and repelled a second attack on German Flatts that April. He built his new house in 1764 on the south shore of the Mohawk River, near the falls and the present-day city of Little Falls; the estate utilized the forced labor of Irish indentured servants and Black slaves. Herkimer was one on the largest slaveholders in his region of New York, owning between 11 and 33 slaves, who worked in his household, farm and portage business. Herkimer joined the Scottish Rite Freemasonry, being initiated in the St. Patrick's Lodge in Johnstown, New York.

=== American Revolution ===
In July and August 1775, Herkimer headed the Tryon County Committee of Safety, and became colonel of the Tryon County militia. After the split in which Loyalist militiamen from the area withdrew to Canada, he was commissioned a brigadier general in the county militia by the Provincial Congress on September 5, 1776. In June 1776, he led 380 men of the Tryon County militia to meet with the Mohawk chief Joseph Brant at Unadilla, New York. Herkimer asked the Mohawk and five other Iroquois nations to remain neutral, while Brant countered that the Indians owed their loyalty to George III.

When Herkimer learned of the British siege of Fort Schuyler to the west in late July 1777, he ordered the Tryon County militia to assemble at Fort Dayton. He marched them out to Fort Schuyler, about 28 miles to the west. His force marching in column was ambushed on August 6 by a mixed force of Loyalist and Hessian regulars and Indian warriors in the Battle of Oriskany. Herkimer's horse was shot, and he was seriously wounded in the leg. It is alleged that, in spite of his injuries, he sat propped up against a tree, lit his pipe, and directed his men in the battle, rallying them to avoid two panicked retreats. When they withdrew, they carried him home.

The brigade surgeon, William Petrie, dressed Herkimer's wound in the field and placed him on a litter. The wound quickly became infected, but the decision to amputate the leg was delayed for about ten days after the battle. The operation was performed by an inexperienced surgeon, Robert Johnson, because Petrie had also been wounded in the battle and was not available. The operation went poorly, the wound bled profusely, and Herkimer died of the injury on August 16, at around the age of 49.

== Legacy ==
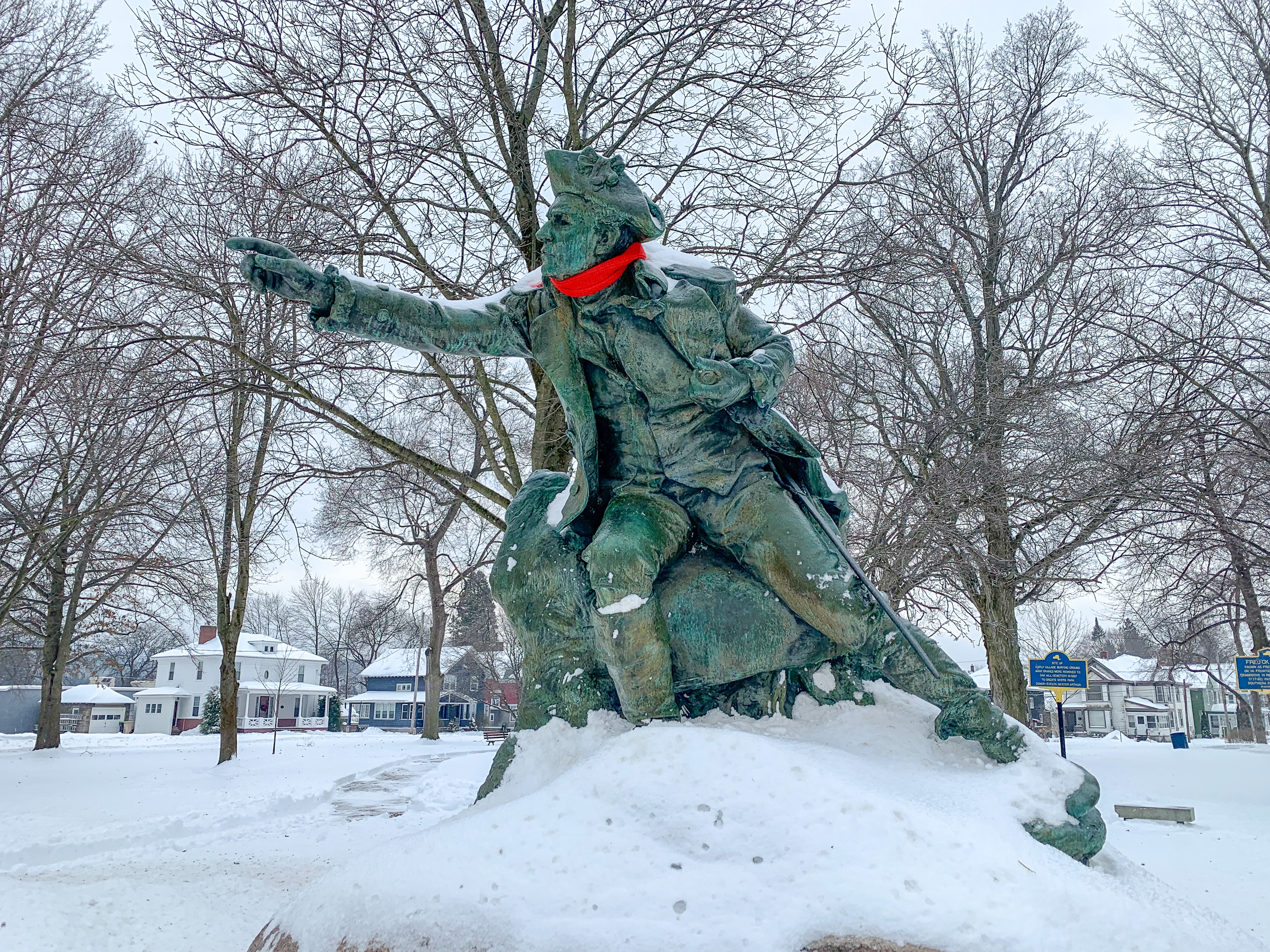
A bronze statue of Herkimer was erected in 1907 in Myers Park in Herkimer, New York

Herkimer's home, in what is now Little Falls, New York, is preserved as the Herkimer Home State Historic Site and is open to the general public for free seasonal tours. The village of Herkimer and Herkimer County, New York, are named in his honor, as are General Herkimer Elementary School and Herkimer County Community College.

His nephew, John Herkimer, later became a U.S. Congressman. Two streets in New York City, Herkimer Place in the Bronx and Herkimer Street in Brooklyn, are named for him. A public school in Brooklyn located on the latter street, P.S./I.S 155 Nicholas Herkimer, also bears his name.

== In popular culture ==
Herkimer was played by Roger Imhof in the 1939 film Drums Along the Mohawk, directed by John Ford. It is based on the 1936 historical novel by Walter D. Edmonds of the same name, about the Colonial era, settlements in the Mohawk Valley, and the American Revolutionary War.
