= Tryon County militia =

Tryon County Militia
- Active: 1775 to 1783
- Allegiance: State of New York
- Type: militia
- Part of: New York Militia
- Engagements: Battle of Oriskany (August 6, 1777); Attack on German Flatts (1778); Battle of Cherry Valley (November 11, 1778); Battle of Klock's Field (October 19, 1780); Battle of Johnstown (October 25, 1781)

Commanders
- Notable commanders: Nicholas Herkimer; Abraham Ten Broeck; Robert Van Rensselaer; Marinus Willett; Joseph House

The Tryon County militia was a Colonial militia formed in Tryon County in the Province of New York. It was created following a March 8, 1772, bill of the Provincial Congress authorizing the establishment of organized militia in each county in the colony. By the 1775 start of the American War of Independence, the Tryon County militia had in effect become an army of rebellion under the control of the Tryon County Committee of Safety. It would go on to fight at the important battles of Oriskany and Johnstown (among others) during the war.

== Militia regiments ==
Early in 1772, the Province of New York passed a bill for the establishment of organized militia in each county. In 1775, the Tryon County militia comprised four regiments, organized according to geographical location:

- 1st regiment: Canajoharie District
- 2nd regiment: Palatine District
- 3rd regiment: Mohawk District
- 4th regiment: German Flatts & Kingsland Districts

=== Expansion ===
A 5th regiment from the Harpersfield area was created under the command of a local resident, Colonel John Harper, on March 3, 1780. Three companies were designated, falling under the commands of: Captain Alexander Harper, Captain Daniel McGillevrey, and Captain Lodwick Breakman. Before they fled to the Canadian Provinces in 1775, Daniel Claus, Sir John Johnson and Guy Johnson were each colonels in command of these regiments.

On August 22, 1775, by order of the New York Provincial Congress, the militias of Tryon County and Albany County were joined to form a brigade. One fourth of each company were selected as minutemen.

== Wartime ==
On October 5, 1776, a resolution of the New York State congress appointed Nicholas Herkimer as brigadier general of the "Brigade of Militia of Tryon County, New York."

On August 6, 1777, the militia, under the command of Herkimer, fought in the Battle of Oriskany with British forces (under the command of Barry St. Leger, Sir John Johnson, Colonel John Butler, and Captain Joseph Brant). While British casualties were high, the Tryon County militia suffered a casualty rate of almost 70%

In 1779, the Tryon County militia was combined with the Albany County militia. On March 20, 1780, Brigadier General Robert Van Rensselaer was given command of a brigade of militia which included the Tryon County militia. In 1781, Marinus Willett was given over-all command of the Tryon County, New York militia.

== Organization ==
=== 1st Regiment ===
The first regiment, or battalion, of the Tryon County Militia was first commanded by Colonel Nicholas Herkimer, later promoted to Brigadier General then was replaced by Colonel Ebenezer Cox (who was wounded and taken prisoner of war in the first volleys of the Battle of Oriskany on August 6, 1777).and Captain Samuel Campbell was promoted to Colonel to fill the vacancy. Companies included those of Captain Abraham Coapman who was later promoted to Major and replaced Johan Joseph House; Captain Henry Diefendorf, who was killed on the Oriskany Battlefield on August 6, 1777 and replaced by his brother, Jacob Dievendorf (died 11/23/1816); Captain Michael Grass who later deserted; and Jost Dygert.

=== 2nd Regiment ===
The second regiment, or battalion, of the Tryon County Militia was commanded by Colonel Jacob Klock. Officers of the second regiment under the command of Colonel Klock included Captain William W. Fox, his son Captain Christopher W. Fox, Captain Christian House, and Captain Nicholas Richtor.

=== 3rd Regiment ===
The third regiment, or battalion, of the Tryon County Militia was commanded by Colonel Frederick Visscher. Lieutenant Colonels were Adam Fonda and Volkert Veeder. Majors were John Bliven and John Nukerk. Adjutants were Robert Yates, Peter Conyn, John G. Lansingh, Jr., and Gideon Marlett. Quarter Masters were Theodorus F. Romine, Abraham Van Horn, and Simon Veeder. Surgeons were John George Folke and Surgeon William Petry, and Philip Cromwell Jr. (aka Jan Philipse Cromwell).

Eight companies constituted the third regiment. As of 26 Aug 1775 these were led by the following:

- 1st Company - Captain Jacob Gardinier, 1st Lieutenant Abraham D. Quackenbus, 2nd Lieutenant William Hall, Ensign Gideon Marlat.
- 2nd Company - Captain John Davis, 1st Lieutenant Abraham Vedder, 2nd Lieutenant Jacob Simon.
- 3rd Company - Captain Robert Yates, 1st Lieutenant Cobus Cromwell, 2nd Lieutenant Peter Yates, Ensign Hendrick Lewis.
- 4th Company - Captain John Fisher, 1st Lieutenant John Wemple, 2nd Lieutenant Mindert W. Quackenbush, Ensign Gerrit Gysbertse VanBrocklin.
- 5th Company - Captain Samuel Pettingell, Lieutenant Thomas Caine, Ensign Samuel Barnhard, Jr.
- 6th Company - Captain Abner French, Lieutenant David McMaster, Ensign Peter VanderLenden.
- 7th Company - Captain Lewis Crout, 1st Lieutenant Jeremiah Swarts, 2nd Lieutenant Christian Carnest, Ensign Emanuel DeGraff.
- 8th Company - Captain Abraham Hodges, 1st Lieutenant Joseph Yeamans, 2nd Lieutenant Abel Hunt, Ensign Amos Bennet.

=== 4th Regiment ===
The fourth regiment, or battalion, of the Tryon County Militia was commanded initially by Col. Hansyoot Herkimer, and after his death in 1775, by Colonel Peter Bellinger, formerly lieutenant colonel of the regiment.

=== Minutemen ===
Sixty men served as minutemen under Colonel Samuel Campbell and Captain Francis Utt.

=== Associated Exempts ===
A company of exempted soldiers acted as a home guard under the command of Captain Jellis Fonda.

=== Rangers ===
Rangers were raised for service in their home counties: "unless called forth for the defence of a neighboring County or State by the Mutual Consent of the bordering County Committees of the respective Counties or States".

On July 23, 1776, by order of the Provincial Congress of New York, three ranger companies were established under the commands of:

- Mark Demuth
- Christian Getman
- John Winn

These ranger companies were disbanded on March 27, 1777

On July 17, 1777, by order of the Provincial Congress of New York, two ranger companies were established under the commands of:

- John Harper
- James Clyde
