= Battle of Oriskany =

1777 battle of the American Revolutionary War

- Part of the Saratoga campaign of the American Revolutionary War
- c. 1901 illustration of the battle
Date	August 6, 1777
Location	near Oriskany, New York 43°10′38″N 75°22′10″W
Result	British victory

Belligerents
United States; Oneida	Great Britain; Hesse-Hanau Haudenosaunee: Mohawk; Seneca; Onondaga; Cayuga; Mississaugas

Commanders and leaders
(United States) Nicholas Herkimer (DOW) (United States) Peter Gansevoort; Louis Cook	(Kingdom of Great Britain) Sir John Johnson (Kingdom of Great Britain) John Butler; Joseph Brant; Cornplanter; Sayenqueraghta

Strength
640–720 militia 60–100 Oneida	500 Indigenous and Loyalists

Casualties and losses
385 killed 50 wounded 30 captured	7 Loyalists killed 21 Loyalists wounded, missing, or captured 65 Indigenous killed or wounded

The Battle of Oriskany (/ɔːrˈɪskəniː/ or /əˈrɪskəniː/) was a major engagement of the Saratoga campaign during the American Revolutionary War. On August 6, 1777, an American column of Tryon County militia and Oneidas marching to relieve the siege of Fort Stanwix was ambushed by a contingent of Britain's Indigenous allies and Loyalists. It was one of the few battles of the war in which most non-Indigenous participants were settlers born in the Thirteen Colonies. The Americans suffered heavy casualties during the battle.

Under the command of Brigadier General Nicholas Herkimer, the American relief column came up the Mohawk Valley and initially consisted of about 800 militiamen and between 60 and 100 Oneida warriors. In response to news of the column's advance, Brigadier General Barry St. Leger dispatched a force of roughly 500 men under the command of Lieutenant Colonel Sir John Johnson to intercept them. Most of Johnson's force were Mohawk, Seneca, Cayuga, Onondaga, and Mississauga warriors led by Sayenqueraghta, Cornplanter, and Joseph Brant (Thayendanegea).

Johnson's men successfully ambushed Herkimer's column in a small valley about 6 miles (10 km) east of Fort Stanwix, near the Oneida village of Oriska. The British victory cost the Americans around 465 dead, wounded, or captured, while Johnson's force suffered only 93 men killed, wounded, or captured. Herkimer was also mortally wounded. The morale of Britain's Indigenous allies was damaged when they discovered that an American sortie from Fort Stanwix had looted their camp during the battle. This was a contributing factor in Leger's decision to abandon the siege two weeks later.

The battle also marked the beginning of a civil war among the Haudenosaunee, as Oneida warriors under Louis Cook and Han Yerry aligned with the Patriot cause, as did the Tuscarora. As the Mohawk, Seneca, Cayuga, and Onondaga were allied to the Loyalist cause, this resulted in incidents of armed conflict between the two factions. The battle's location is known in Haudenosaunee oral histories as "A Place of Great Sadness", and has been designated as a National Historic Landmark along with being marked by a monument at the Oriskany Battlefield State Historic Site.

== Background ==
In June 1777, the British Army launched a two-pronged attack from Quebec under the command of General John Burgoyne, whose objective was to split New England from the other colonies by gaining control of New York's Hudson Valley. The main thrust came south across Lake Champlain under Burgoyne's command; the second thrust was led by St. Leger and was intended to come down the Mohawk Valley and meet Burgoyne's army near Albany.

St. Leger's expedition consisted of about 1,800 men who were a mix of British regulars, Creuzbourg's Jäger Corps, Loyalists from the Royal Yorkers and the British Indian Department, and Indigenous warriors of several tribes, including the Seneca, Cayuga, Onondaga, Mohawk, and Mississauga. The main body travelled from Lachine up the Saint Lawrence River and along the shore of Lake Ontario to the Oswego River. At Oswega, they were joined by British Indian Department rangers from Fort Niagara under the command of Deputy Superintendent John Butler, and several hundred Indigenous warriors. The expedition ascended the Oswego River and crossed Oneida Lake to reach the Oneida Carry. Fort Stanwix, a Continental Army outpost at the east end of the portage, was besieged beginning August 2.

== Prelude ==
Tryon County's Committee of Safety head Nicholas Herkimer was warned of a possible British attack along the Mohawk River, and he issued a proclamation on July 17 warning of possible military activity and urging the people to respond if needed. Oneida allies warned him on July 30 that the British were just four days from Fort Stanwix, and he put out a call-to-arms. The force raised totaled 800 from the Tryon County militia composed primarily of poorly trained farmers who were chiefly of Palatine German descent. They set out from Fort Dayton on August 4 and camped near the Oneida village of Oriska on August 5. A number of the militia dropped out of the column due to their lack of conditioning, but Herkimer's forces were augmented by a company of 60 to 100 Oneida warriors led by Han Yerry, a strong supporter of the Patriot cause. That evening, Herkimer sent three men toward the fort with messages for the fort's commander Colonel Peter Gansevoort. Gansevoort was to signal the receipt of the message with three cannon shots and then sortie to meet the approaching column. The couriers, however, had difficulty getting through British lines, and they did not deliver the message until late the next morning, after the battle was already underway.

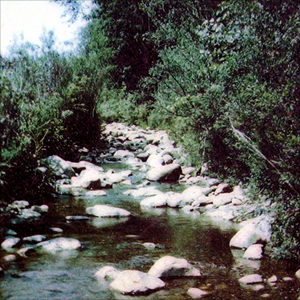
The site of the ambush at Bloody Creek, New York

St. Leger learned on August 5 that Herkimer and his relief expedition were on their way from a message that Molly Brant had sent to her brother Joseph Brant, the Mohawk leader who led a portion of St. Leger's Indigenous contingent. St. Leger sent a detachment of light infantry from Sir John Johnson's Royal Yorkers towards Oriska that evening to monitor Herkimer's advance, and Brant and Butler followed early the next morning with about 400 Indigenous warriors and Indian Department rangers. Many of the warriors were armed with muskets, however, others carried only tomahawks and spears.

== Battle ==
Herkimer held a war council on the morning of August 6. He wanted to wait because he had not heard the expected signal from the fort, but his captains pressed him to continue, accusing him of being a Tory because his brother was serving under St. Leger. He was stung by the accusations and relented, ordering the column to march on toward Stanwix.

About 6 miles (10 km) from the fort, the road dipped more than 50 feet (15 m) into a marshy ravine with a stream at the bottom that was about 3 feet (1 m) wide. Seneca chiefs Sayenqueraghta and Cornplanter chose this place to set up an ambush; the Royal Yorkers waited behind a nearby rise and the Haudenosaunee concealed themselves on both sides of the ravine. The plan was for the Royal Yorkers to stop the head of the column, after which their Indigenous allies would attack the extended column. At about 10 am, Herkimer's column descended into the ravine, crossed the stream, and began ascending the other side with Herkimer on horseback near the front.

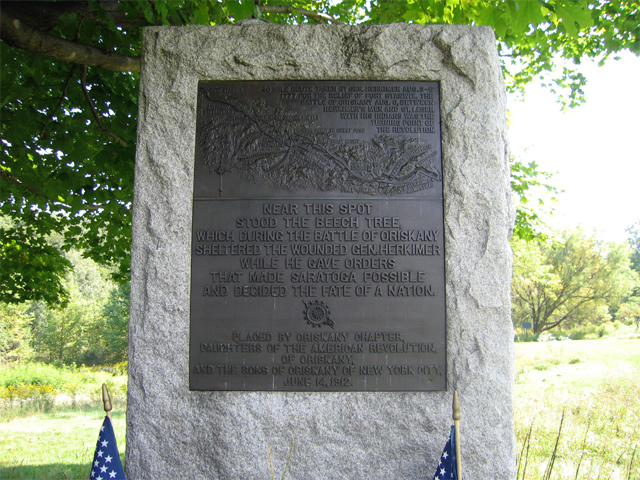
Monument marking the location of the tree to which Herkimer was taken

Contrary to the plan, the Indigenous warriors lying in wait opened fire prematurely, however, the Patriots were taken completely by surprise. Colonel Ebenezer Cox was leading the 1st Regiment (Canajoharie district), and he was shot off his horse and killed in the first volley. Herkimer turned his horse to see the action and was struck by a ball that shattered his leg and killed the horse. Several of his officers carried him to a beech tree and urged him to retire from further danger. He defiantly replied, "I will face the enemy", and calmly sat leaning against the tree smoking a pipe and giving directions and words of encouragement to the men nearby.

The trap had been sprung too early, and portions of the column had not yet entered the ravine. Most of these men panicked and fled; some of the attacking warriors pursued them, resulting in a string of dead and wounded that extended for several miles (kilometers). Between the loss of the column rear and those killed or wounded in the initial volleys, only about half of Herkimer's men were still fighting 30 minutes into the battle. Some of the attackers who were not armed with muskets waited for the flash of an opponent's musket fire before rushing to attack with the tomahawk. During the battle, Oneida leader Akiatonharónkwen (Colonel Louis Cook) shot and killed an enemy warrior whose musket fire was devastatingly accurate, noting that "every time he rises up he kills one of our men".

Herkimer's men eventually rallied, fighting their way out of the ravine to the crest to its west. John Johnson was concerned about the militia's tenacity, so he returned to the British camp and requested some reinforcements from St. Leger, returning with 70 men. A thunderstorm caused a one-hour break in the fighting, during which Herkimer regrouped his militia on the higher ground. He instructed his men to fight in pairs; while one man fired and reloaded, the other waited and then only fired if attacked. They were to keep at least one weapon loaded at all times to reduce the effectiveness of the tomahawk attacks.

Painting of the battle by Egbert Norman Clark, 1936

Butler took time during the thunderstorm to question some of the captives, and thus learned about the three-cannon signal. Reinforcements from the Royal Yorkers arrived, and Butler convinced them to turn their coats inside out to disguise themselves as a relief party coming from the fort. When the fighting resumed, the Royal Yorkers advanced, but the ruse failed when Patriot Captain Jacob Gardinier recognized the face of a Loyalist neighbor. Close combat continued for some time, often hand-to-hand between men who had been neighbors.

=== Sortie from Fort Stanwix ===
Herkimer's messengers reached the fort at around 11 a.m., and Colonel Gansevoort organized the requested sortie. Lieutenant Colonel Marinus Willett led 250 men from the fort and raided the nearly deserted enemy camps to the south, driving away the few people left in them (including women) and taking four prisoners along the way. They collected blankets and other personal possessions from the indigenous camps, and they also raided John Johnson's camp, taking his letters and other writings.

One of the warriors guarding the camps ran to the battlefield to alert fellow warriors that their camps were being raided. They disengaged with cries of "Oonah, oonah!", the Seneca signal to retire, and headed for the camps to protect their women and possessions. This forced the smaller number of German and Loyalist combatants to also withdraw.

== Aftermath ==
=== Patriots ===
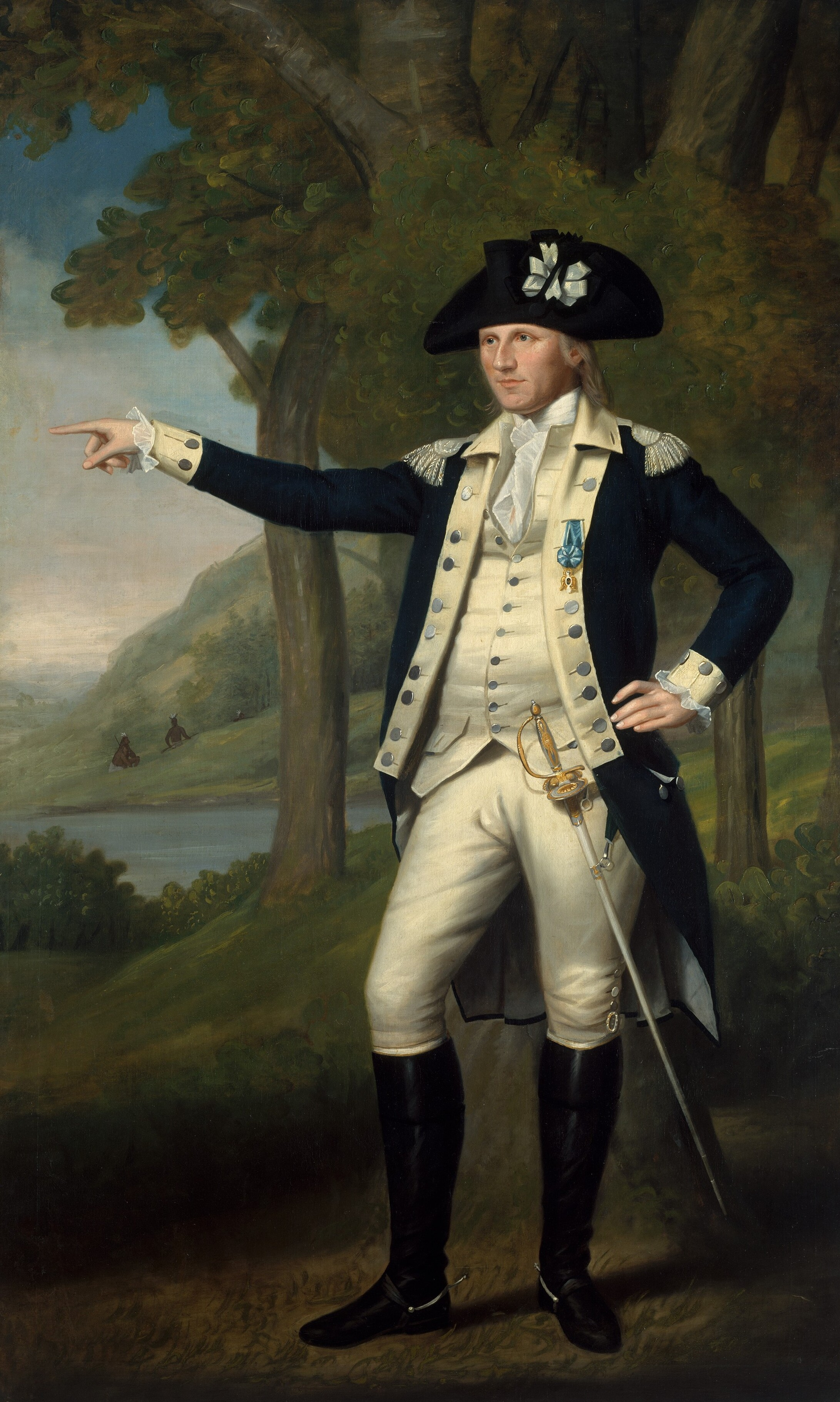
Lt. Col. Marinus Willett, a 1791 portrait by Ralph Earl

Herkimer was seriously wounded and many of his officers were killed, and the battered remnant retreated to Fort Dayton. His men carried him from the battlefield and his leg was amputated, but the operation went poorly and he died on August 16. The indigenous warriors retrieved most of their dead by the following day, but many dead and wounded Patriots were left on the field. Benedict Arnold's relief column marched through several weeks later, and the men were moved by the stench and grisly scene.

General Philip Schuyler learned of the retreat from Oriskany and immediately organized additional relief to be sent to the area. Arnold's relief column arrived at Fort Stanwix on August 21, and he sent messengers into the British camp who convinced the British and indigenous besiegers that his force was much larger than it actually was. They abandoned their siege and withdrew.

=== Loyalists ===
In September 1777, Butler, a British Indian Department official, was authorized to raise a Loyalist military unit which became known as Butler's Rangers. Indian Department rangers who had fought at Oriskany formed the core of this regiment. After the siege was lifted, many of the Loyalist soldiers returned to Fort Niagara or Montreal, while others joined Burgoyne's campaign on the Hudson, including numerous warriors from various tribes.

=== Haudenosaunee ===
Brant and Seneca chief Sayenqueraghta proposed the next day to continue the fighting by pursuing the Patriots downriver toward German Flatts, New York, but St. Leger turned them down. This battle marked the beginning of a war among the tribes in the Haudenosaunee Confederacy, as it was the first time that they had fought against one other. The Mohawks, Senecas, Cayugas, and Onondagas were allied with the British, as were some Oneidas, and the Haudenosaunee in St. Leger's camp met in council and decided to send the Patriot-allied Oneidas a bloody hatchet. Brant's Mohawks raided and burned the Oneida settlement of Oriska later in the siege. In retaliation, the Oneidas plundered the Mohawk strongholds of Tiononderoge and Canajoharie. They later raided the Fort Hunter Mohawks, prompting most of the remaining Mohawks in central New York to flee to Quebec.

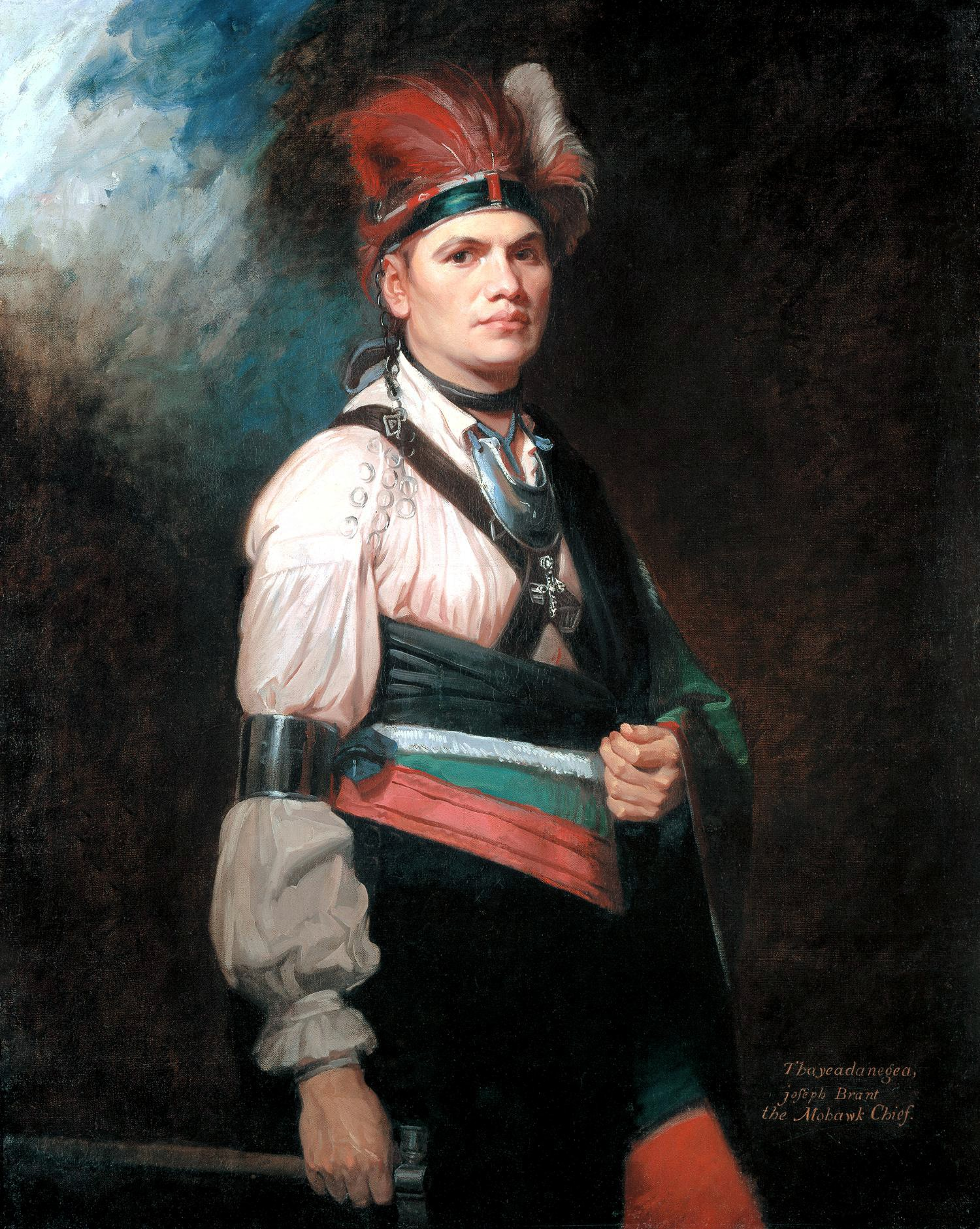
Mohawk Chief Joseph Brant, 1776 portrait by George Romney

A number of Patriots were taken prisoner by Indigenous warriors during the battle. While many of these captives were turned over to the British, some were tortured and killed. In his account of the battle, Patriot prisoner Dr. Moses Younglove accused the British and Loyalists of aiding and abetting the murders, and claimed "the savages" ate two of the prisoners. Canadian historian Gavin Watt, however, has described Younglove's account as "highly coloured" and "extremely suspect."

=== Assessment ===
The battle was one of the bloodiest of the war, based on the percentage of casualties suffered. About half of Herkimer's force were killed or wounded, as were about 15 percent of the Loyalist force. The battle may be considered a success for St. Leger because he stopped the Patriot relief column. However, the remnants of the Patriot force remained present on the battlefield after the withdrawal of the Loyalist force when news spread of the sortie against the indigenous camps. News of the sortie may have averted the complete destruction of Herkimer's force.

The British success was tempered by discontent of their indigenous allies after the battle. When they joined the expedition, they expected British forces would do most of the fighting. However, they were the dominant fighters in this action, and some suffered the loss of their personal belongings taken during the Patriot sortie from the fort. This blow to their morale contributed to the eventual failure of St. Leger's expedition.

== Legacy ==
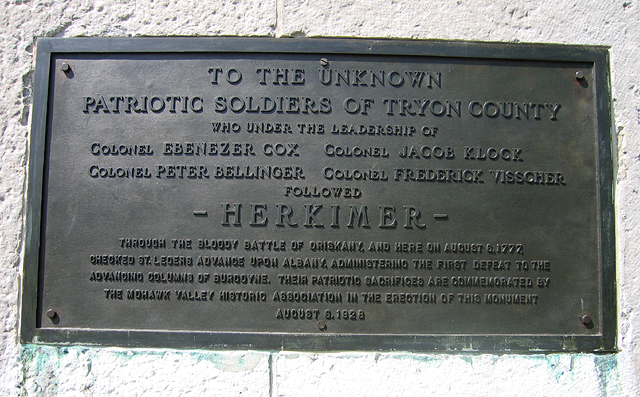
Monument to the unknown Tryon County patriots

In an interview many years afterwards, Governor Blacksnake recalled how he "thought at that time the Blood Shed a Stream running down on the decending [sic] ground." The battle's location is known in Haudenosaunee oral histories as "A Place of Great Sadness."

A monument was erected in 1883 to commemorate the battle at 43° 10.6′N 75° 22.2′W, and much of the battlefield is now preserved in the Oriskany Battlefield State Historic Site. The site was recognized as a National Historic Landmark in 1962, and added to the National Register of Historic Places in 1966. The town of Herkimer, New York and Herkimer County, New York were named in Herkimer's honor. The battle was honored by the name of aircraft carrier USS Oriskany, launched in 1945, now an artificial reef, and also by the issuance of a postage stamp in 1977.

== See also ==
- American Revolutionary War § British northern strategy fails. Places 'Battle of Oriskany' in overall sequence and strategic context.
- A fictional character in Drums along the Mohawk, a 1936 novel by Walter D. Edmonds, was based on Adam Helmer, one of Herkimer's messengers.
- Sampson Sammons, a Colonel
- USS Oriskany
