= Remington brothers =

Remington brothers commonly refers to the three brothers who ran E. Remington and Sons (including Remington Arms) after the death of their father, Eliphalet Remington. The three brothers were:

- Eliphalet Remington III (1828–1924)
- Philo Remington (1816–1889)
- Samuel Remington (1819–1882)
