= Benjamin Carver =

American banker and politician

Member of the New York State Assembly from Herkimer County
- In office 1839–1840 Serving with Atwater Cooke Jr.
- Preceded by: Abijah Mann Jr. and Volney Owen
- Succeeded by: Daniel Bellinger and George Burch

Personal details
- Born: 1796 Providence, Rhode Island, U.S.
- Died: July 16, 1879 (aged 82–83) Chicago, Illinois, U.S.
- Party: Democratic
- Children: 6
- Parents: Joseph Carver (father); Abigail Round (mother)
- Relatives: Hartwell Carver (brother); Levi Leiter (son-in-law); Samuel Remington (son-in-law)
- Profession: banker, businessman

Benjamin F. Carver (1796–July 16, 1879) was an American banker, businessman, and politician. He was involved in numerous business ventures, including banks, in his native state of New York before departing for Chicago, Illinois, United States, in the late-1850s, where he continued to work in banking and amassed a sizable fortune. He served in the New York General Assembly from 1839 to 1840, being elected in 1838 as a Democrat to a seat representing Herkimer County. He was the Democratic nominee for mayor of Chicago in the city's 1857 mayoral election, losing to Republican nominee John Wentworth.

== Early life ==
Carver was born in Providence, Rhode Island, in 1796, the son of Capt. Joseph Carver and Abigail Carver (née Round). Carver grew up in Winfield, New York. He was the brother of Hartwell Carver.

== Business career ==
Carver worked as a postmaster, merchant, and distillery owner in East Winfield, New York, in partnership with. David R. Carrier. He subsequently moved to the village of Mohawk (which like Winfield, was in Herkimer County). By 1851, he was employed as the president of the Mohawk Valley Bank and had incorporated the Herkimer County Bank. He worked as a director of the Mohawk Valley Railroad.

By 1856, Carver had moved to Brooklyn. However, soon after he left the state of New York for the state of Illinois, moving to Chicago. He lived in Chicago for the remainder of his life. After moving to Illinois, he worked as a director of the Illinois National Bank, and was a major stockholder and the director of the Marine Bank of Chicago. Carver amassed a sizable fortune during his years in Chicago.

== Political career ==
From 1839 to 1840, Carver was a member of the New York State Assembly from Herkimer County. Elected in 1838 as a Democrat, he served in the 62nd New York State Legislature.

Carver was the unsuccessful Democratic nominee in the 1857 Chicago mayoral election, losing to Republican nominee John Wentworth. The election occurred several years before the American Civil War, with the debate over slavery in the United States being prominent both nationally and in the mayoral election. Carver campaigned on pro-slavery positions, while Wentworth was a well-established proponent of abolitionist policies. Former congressman Abraham Lincoln (at the time a U.S. Senate aspirant in Illinois; and who would later go on to be elected President in 1860) came to Chicago to campaign in support of Wentworth's candidacy against Carver.

== Personal life ==
Carver married Nancy Lathrop Fish (the daughter of Litchfield, New York, farmer Samuel Fish). Together they had six children:

- Louisa Doolittle (née Carver), 1827–1890 (married Harvey Doolittle)
- Flora Ann Remington (née Carver), 1831–1888 (married Samuel Remington, executive at E. Remington & Sons)
- Benjamin Franklin Carver, 1832–1893
- Victoria Thompson (née Carver), 1842–1912 (married T. H. Thompson)
- Mary Theresa Leiter (née Carver), 1844–1913 (married Levi Leiter, co-founder of Marshall Field's)
- Watt Samuel Carver, born circa 1846

Carver died at the age of 84 on July 16, 1879 at his residence on Congress Street in Chicago. He left an estate valued at $250,000.
