= Model 1863 Percussion Contract Rifle =

- Type: rifle (muzzle loader, percussion)
- Place of origin: United States

Production history
- Designer: U.S. Ordnance Department
- Designed: 1862
- Manufacturer: E. Remington & Sons
- Developed from: M1841 Mississippi rifle
- Unit cost: $17 USD
- Produced: 1863–1865
- No. built: 12,500

Specifications
- Cartridge: Paper cartridge, Minié-Burton ball
- Caliber: .58
- Barrels: 33" in
- Action: Caplock
- Feed system: Muzzle-loaded
- Sights: A barrel is equipped with a two-leaf rear sight and a blade front sight

The Model 1863 Percussion Contract Rifle, commonly nicknamed the "Zouave", is a rifle that was manufactured by E. Remington and Sons for the United States Army during the American Civil War. It was manufactured to fulfill a government contract for rifles patterned after the M1841 Mississippi rifle.

== Design ==
A "musket" (under 1860s terminology), the firearm is a .58 caliber, muzzle loaded, percussion rifle. The firearm's design was intended to create a more maneuverable gun for Union soldiers. From the inception of its design, it was intended to be calibered in .58. It incorporates several features of the M1841 Mississippi rifle (the so-called "Harpers Ferry" rifle), especially elements of the long-range version of the M1841 Mississippi. The Model 1863 Percussion Contract Rifle features brass mounts and a patch box. It has a standard barrel length of 33 inches (840 mm).

The firearm is reputed to have a handsome appearance, and to be of ergonomic proportions.

== Names ==
Contemporary official government documents referred to the rifle as the "Harpers Ferry Pattern". The works of firearm historian George D. Moller refers to the rifle as the "Remington 1862 Contract Rifle", while Flayderman's Guide to Antique Firearms and Their Values referred to the firearm as the "1863 Contract Rifle". The nickname "Zouave" and "Remington Zouave" is commonly used for the gun, especially for those manufactured by Remington & Sons during the second fulfilled contract they fulfilled (which vary slightly from those manufactured under the initial contract).

An repro M1863 "Zouave" being fired by gun enthusiasts

== Production and history ==
Approximately 12,000 were produced, which were delivered to the government between April 1863 and January 1864. Another 500 rifle were ordered in 1865.

The Ordinance Department of the United States Military had placed its initial order for 10,000 on July 30, 1861. The Remington brothers received the order around the time of the funeral of their father, family and company patriarch Eliphalet Remington.

The order specified that the government wanted the manufacture of,

10,000 stands of arms, 58 inch caliber, and to have three-leaf rear sight and a cupped ramrod, with sword bayonet stud similar to those of the Harpers Ferry rifle model of 1855.

The Remingtons accepted the order. However, they found themselves unable to quickly fulfill the order due to their machinery being in-use to fulfill revolver contracts. They successfully requested an extension of the contract deadline, and on August 11, 1862, the contract was re-issued; now specifying for the manufacture of 10,000 58-caliber Harpers Ferry pattern rifles with sword bayonets, furnished with regular appendages. The contract paid $17 per each completed arm. To complete the order, Remington & Sons acquired additional machinery. The manufacture took place at their factory in Ilion, New York. Remington & Sons sub-contracted with Collins & Co. for sword bayonets and scabbards. Remington initially contract estimates to 40,000 or 50,000 units, proposing a reduction in the per-unit price from $20 to $17, inclusive of bayonets. The rifle functioned as a simplified and refined iteration of the U.S. M1855 model.

The first 500 completed arms were delivered on April 18, 1863. Approximately 1,000 were delivered per month until the contract period expired, with 7,501 delivered in total under the contract. On December 13, 1863, the military awarded Remington & Sons a further contract for 2,500 more rifles to be delivered by January 8, 1864. All 2,500 ordered rifles were delivered between December 23, 1863, and January 8, 1864. The rifles completed during the second fulfilled contract were slightly shorter and had only two barrel bands.

The rifle is believed to have seen little use Civil War combat, and was not issued by the Army to any of its units. The exact users of the weapon and source of their "Zouave" nickname is unclear to modern historians. There is not evidence to substantiate that the so-called America "Zouave" units active in the Civil War ever made use of this particular musket but the rifle was actually issued to a company of New York Zouaves. Many examples of the firearm remain in quality-condition, further evidencing the likelihood that they did not see significant use in combat.

Reports suggest that a quantity of Zouave rifles were liquidated as surplus to the French government in the Franco-Prussian War, though not in large or official quantities.

== Modern usage ==
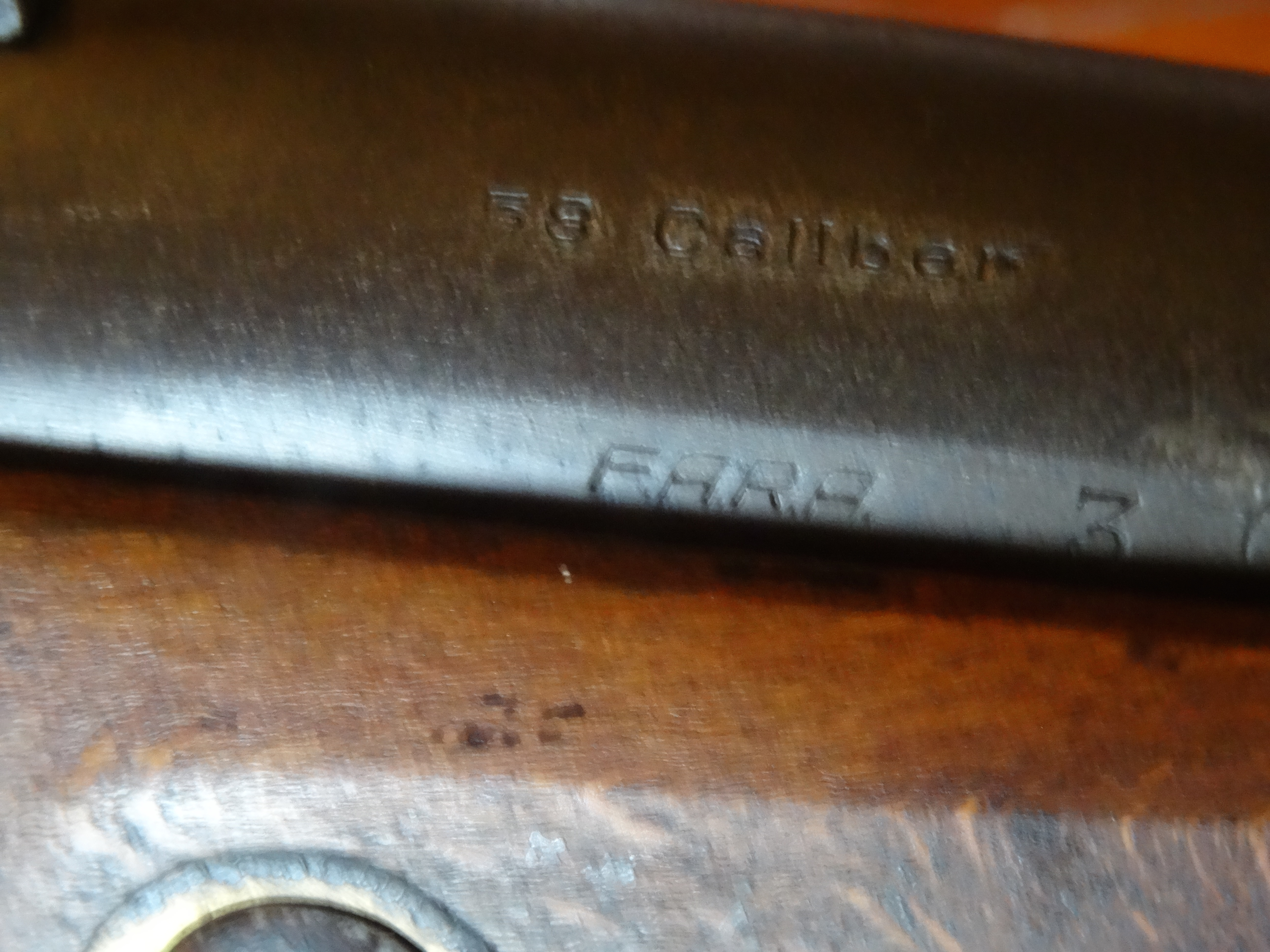
An repro marking "FARB"

The Model 1863 Zouave musket was produced in Italy beginning in the 1950s, with the 2nd Type being advertised in vintage magazines.

The Miroku built high-quality reproduction of the Zouave Model 1863 musket alongside U.S. Springfield Model, valued today by collectors and reenactors for its craftsmanship and historical accuracy.
