= Jane Douglas (disambiguation) =

Jane Douglas may refer to:

- Lady Jane Douglas (1698–1753), Scottish noblewoman
- Jane Scott, Countess of Dalkeith (1701–1729), born Lady Jane Douglas, Scottish noblewoman
- Jane Douglas (Mother Douglas) (c. 1700–1761), English brothel-keeper
- Jane Douglas (fl. 1862), first woman employed by the U.S. government
- Jane Douglas, British YouTuber, co-editor of the OutsideXbox channel
