= First United Methodist Church (Ilion, New York) =

Historic church in New York, United States

- U.S. National Register of Historic Places
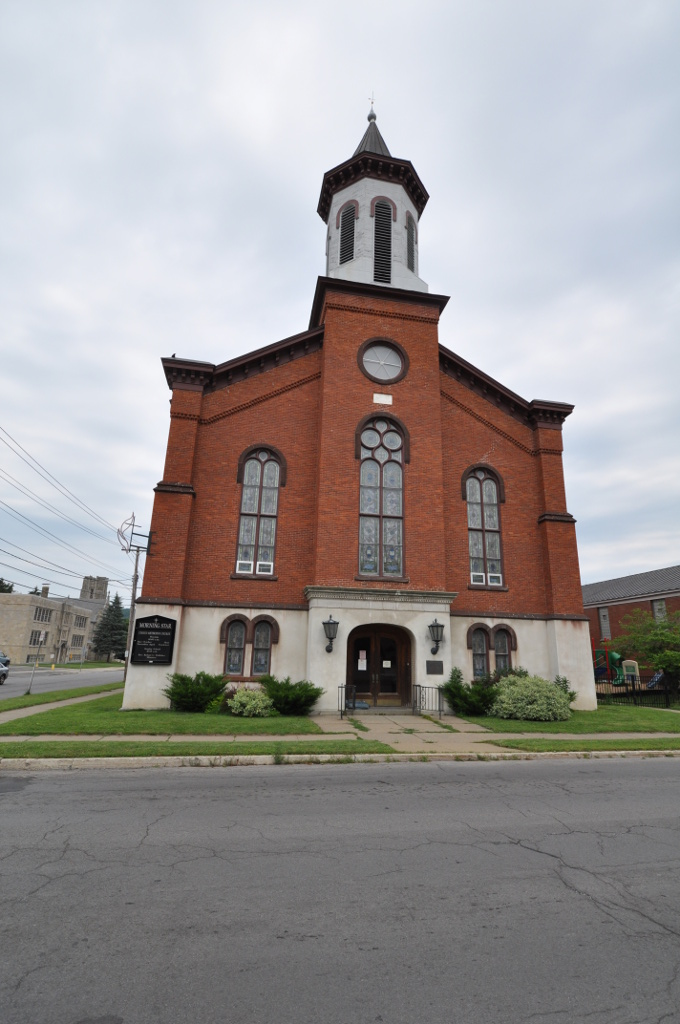

- Location within New York Location within the United States
- Location: 36 Second St., Ilion, New York
- Coordinates: 43°0′49″N 75°2′21″W
- Area: less than one acre
- Built: 1864
- Architect: Hose, John; Cowles, Eben & Son
- Architectural style: Italianate
- NRHP reference No.: 03000601
- Added to NRHP: July 5, 2003

First United Methodist Church is a historic United Methodist church at Ilion in Herkimer County, New York. It consists of the original church was built between 1864 and 1866 and the attached 1890 Remington Chapel. The main block of the church consists of tall, red brick masonry walls erected above a basement of cut stone in the Italianate style. The 85 feet by 45 feet rectangular, gable roofed sanctuary features an engaged brick entrance / bell tower. The Remington Chapel features Tiffany stained glass windows installed in 1911 and 1928 in memory to members of the Remington family.

It was listed on the National Register of Historic Places in 2003.
