= United States Post Office (Ilion, New York) =

- US Post Office-Ilion
- U.S. National Register of Historic Places
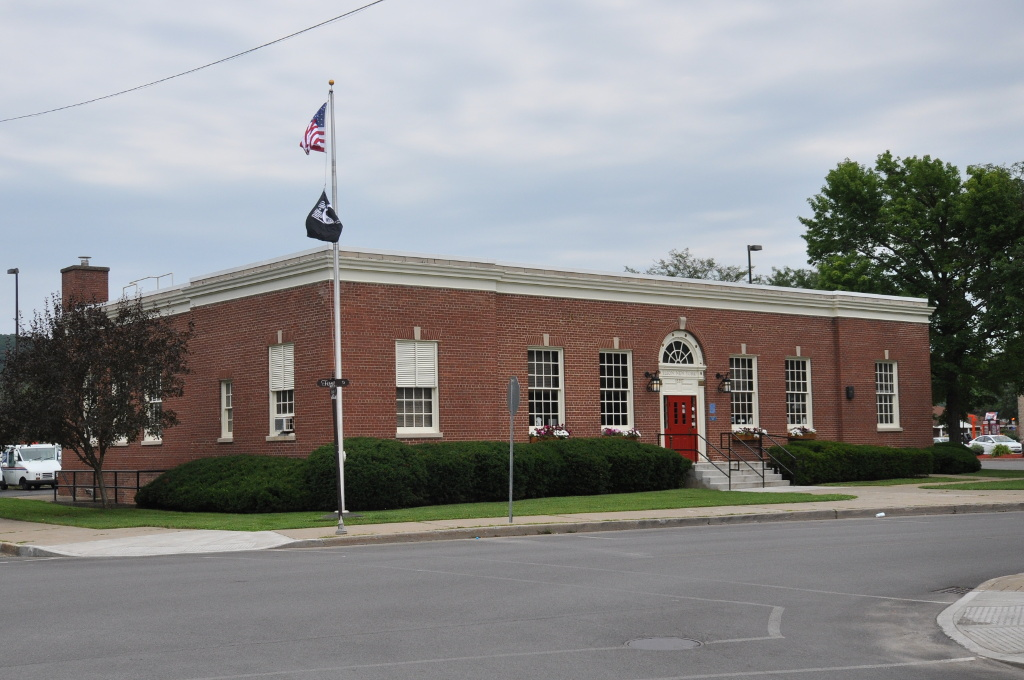

- Location within New York Location within the United States
- Interactive map showing the location for U.S. Post Office-Ilion
- Location: 48 First St., Ilion, New York
- Coordinates: 43°0′53″N 75°2′15″W
- Area: less than one acre
- Built: 1935
- Architect: Simon, Louis A.; Amateis, Edmond
- Architectural style: Colonial Revival
- MPS: US Post Offices in New York State, 1858-1943, TR
- NRHP reference No.: 88002513
- Added to NRHP: May 11, 1989

US Post Office-Ilion is a historic post office building located at Ilion in Herkimer County, New York, United States. It was built in 1935–36, and is one of a number of post offices in New York State designed by the Office of the Supervising Architect of the Treasury Department, Louis A. Simon. It is a one-story, seven-bay, steel frame building on a raised foundation with a brick watercourse in the Colonial Revival style. The interior features a 1937 plaster relief by artist Edmond Amateis of Eliphalet Remington.

It was listed on the National Register of Historic Places in 1989.
