= Inez Harrington Whitfield =

American botanical artist and educator (1867–1951)

- late 1940s image
- Born: May 25, 1867; German Flatts, New York
- Died: June 26, 1951 (aged 84); Hot Springs, Arkansas
- Resting place: Armory Hill Cemetery; Ilion, New York; 43.00804°N 75.03692°W
- Education: Smith College
- Known for: Whitfield-Bliss School for Girls

Inez Harrington Whitfield (May 25, 1867 – June 26, 1951) was an educator and botanical illustrator best known for her watercolor paintings of wildflowers native to Arkansas.

== Biography ==
Inez Harrington Whitfield was born on May 25, 1867, to James Whitfield and Ida Doty Whitfield. She had one sibling, a sister named Erle Winfred who was born in 1873. Their mother was a direct descendent of Edward Doty, an early American colonist. The family lived in Ilion, New York, where Inez received an early education before graduating from Smith College in Northampton, Massachusetts in 1889 with a bachelor of letters degree.

Inez struggled with rheumatoid arthritis for the majority of her life, eventually relying on a wheelchair for mobility starting in 1911. In 1901, she began regularly traveling to Hot Springs, Arkansas to take advantage of the effect the area's warmer weather and therapeutic baths had on her disability. She officially moved to Arkansas in the early 1900s and soon became a recognized figure in the community, founding the area's first Little Theater in the late 1920s. She organized the Hot Springs Garden Club and the Hot Springs Business and Professional Women's Club, as well as the Hot Springs branch of the American Association of University Women. The 1915 publication Woman's Who's Who of America had a brief biography on Whitfield, which pointedly included a sentence on her anti-suffragist views.

When she wasn't painting or organizing community events, Whitfield could often be found birdwatching and recording her findings with scientific meticulousness. She wrote an article detailing her backyard observations of a pair of nesting yellow-throated vireos that was published in the journal Bird-Lore (now known as simply Audubon) in 1920.

Inez Harrington Whitfield died on June 26, 1951, in Hot Springs, Arkansas at the age of 84. She is buried at Armory Hill Cemetery in her hometown of Ilion, New York.

== Career ==
Though Whitfield received undergraduate instruction in education and worked for several years as both a schoolteacher and a principal, her struggles with rheumatoid arthritis forced her to leave the profession in the early 1900s. She began watercolor painting in the 1930s and became well known in the Arkansas area for her accurate depictions of native plant life. In 1935, she appeared in a publication about female leaders titled American Women.

=== Educator ===
After Whitfield graduated from Smith College in 1889, she moved back to New York and began teaching at the Gardner Institute for Girls. Soon after, she left the school in favor of collaborating with her friend and colleague Caroline E. Bliss. The pair formed the Whitfield-Bliss School for Girls in New York City in late 1896, before Whitfield's move to Arkansas.

The Whitfield-Bliss School for Girls, sometimes listed as the Mount Morris Park School, operated as a girls' boarding and day school from 1896 until 1901 at 41. W. 124th St. in Harlem, Manhattan. The row house had previously served as a private residence and would eventually serve as a community meeting house for several decades once the school was closed. The school was successful until Inez's arthritis forced them to close in 1901 as she sought treatment outside of the state of New York. As of 2022 the building still stands, now known as the Antioch Church of God.

=== Artist ===
In the 1930s, Inez began the project that would soon become her life's passion: painting the native wildflowers of Arkansas. By the time she died in 1951, she had painted more than five hundred original watercolor paintings of wildflowers, organized according to location and blooming season. She recorded every flower's exact colors and size and properly labeled them with both their common and Latin names.

She traversed the area's many hiking trails in her wheelchair to collect the perfect flowers to paint, eventually becoming so well known that strangers would bring her plants from all over the state that they thought were particularly excellent specimens. She had an especially good relationship with many of the local Boy and Girl Scouts, who would happily help her scavenge for the best example of a particular flower. Whitfield replanted nearly all of the flowers she used as references as soon as she was done with them.

In her lifetime, Whitfield exhibited her watercolor paintings at the Rockefeller Center, the gallery at the Garden of Nations, the University of Colorado in Boulder, and the Hot Springs Fine Arts Center. She was given a posthumous solo exhibition at the latter in 1986 as part of Arkansas' Sesquicentennial Celebration.

== Collections ==
In the 1940s, the Federated Women's Clubs of Arkansas purchased more than four hundred botanical paintings by Inez Harrington Whitfield and donated them to the Arkansas Arts Center, now known as the Arkansas Museum of Fine Arts in Little Rock, Arkansas. The purchase was the result of several years of campaigning and fundraising by Arkansas' various women's clubs and the American Association of University Women.

- Over 350 individual works, ca. 1935, Arkansas Museum of Fine Arts.
- Original paintings and photographs of Inez Harrington Whitfield, 1901–1951, Garland County Historical Society.
