= Jennie Douglas =

First woman employed by the U.S. government

Jeanette L. Douglass, also referred to as Jennie Douglas or Jane Douglas, was the first woman officially hired to work for at the U.S. Treasury. She was the first in a cohort of 70 women hired by U.S. Treasurer Francis E. Spinner in 1862, sometimes known as the First Treasury Girls. Douglas' role was to trim money, which at the time had to be physically cut by hand. Her legacy has been recognized by Janet Yellen, the first woman secretary of the Treasury and Chair of the Federal Reserve. Douglas is sometimes attributed to having been the first woman to hold an appointed position in the Federal government.

== Biography ==
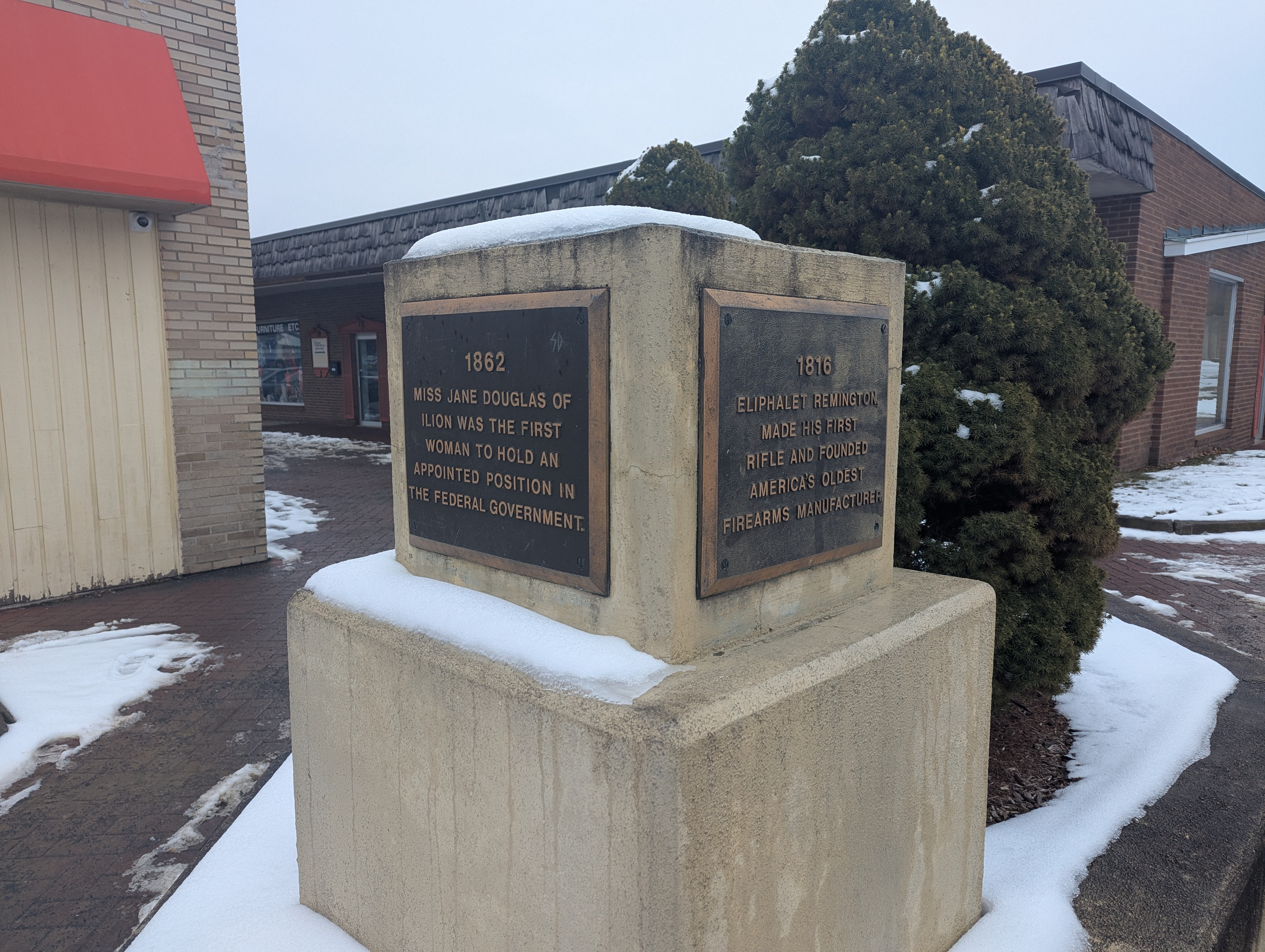
Monument to Jane Douglas and Eliphalet Remington in Ilion, New York

Douglas was born in Peterboro, New York. She later moved to the village of Ilion with her brother, John. Douglas had worked as a school teacher. She taught the daughter of Francis E. Spinner, then Treasurer of the United States. Her school was shut down as a result of the American Civil War, as was the next one she started.

In 1862, an unemployed Douglas was pursued by Spinner to work in his treasury office. At the time, Spinner was attempting to persuade Governor Salmon P. Chase to employ women in federal service as he believed they would work harder than men for less money. Spinner knew Douglas as a strong woman, stating she was a "great tall double-fisted girl, that was more than a match for any of the men in the room." On her first day, Douglas proved that women would be more than capable of handling the large shears needed to trim money. Spinner later recollected that, "her first day's work settled the matter forever in her and in the women's favor. The men left and women took their place." Seven more women were subsequently employed. Douglas was paid a salary of around $300.

Ella Dimock, historian for the village of Ilion in the 1950s, noted that it's unknown what happened to Douglas in her later years. In the 1888 obituary of her brother John, it was stated that he had, "spent many years, and all the means he could afford in the endeavour [sic] to find some clue to his sister, who suddenly disappeared from the knowing of the family after her return from Europe."

== See also ==
- Sophia Holmes, an American federal civil servant who was the first Black/African-American woman hired by the United States Federal government
