= E. Remington & Sons =

American manufacturer of firearms and typewriters

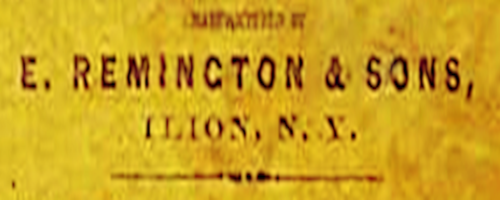

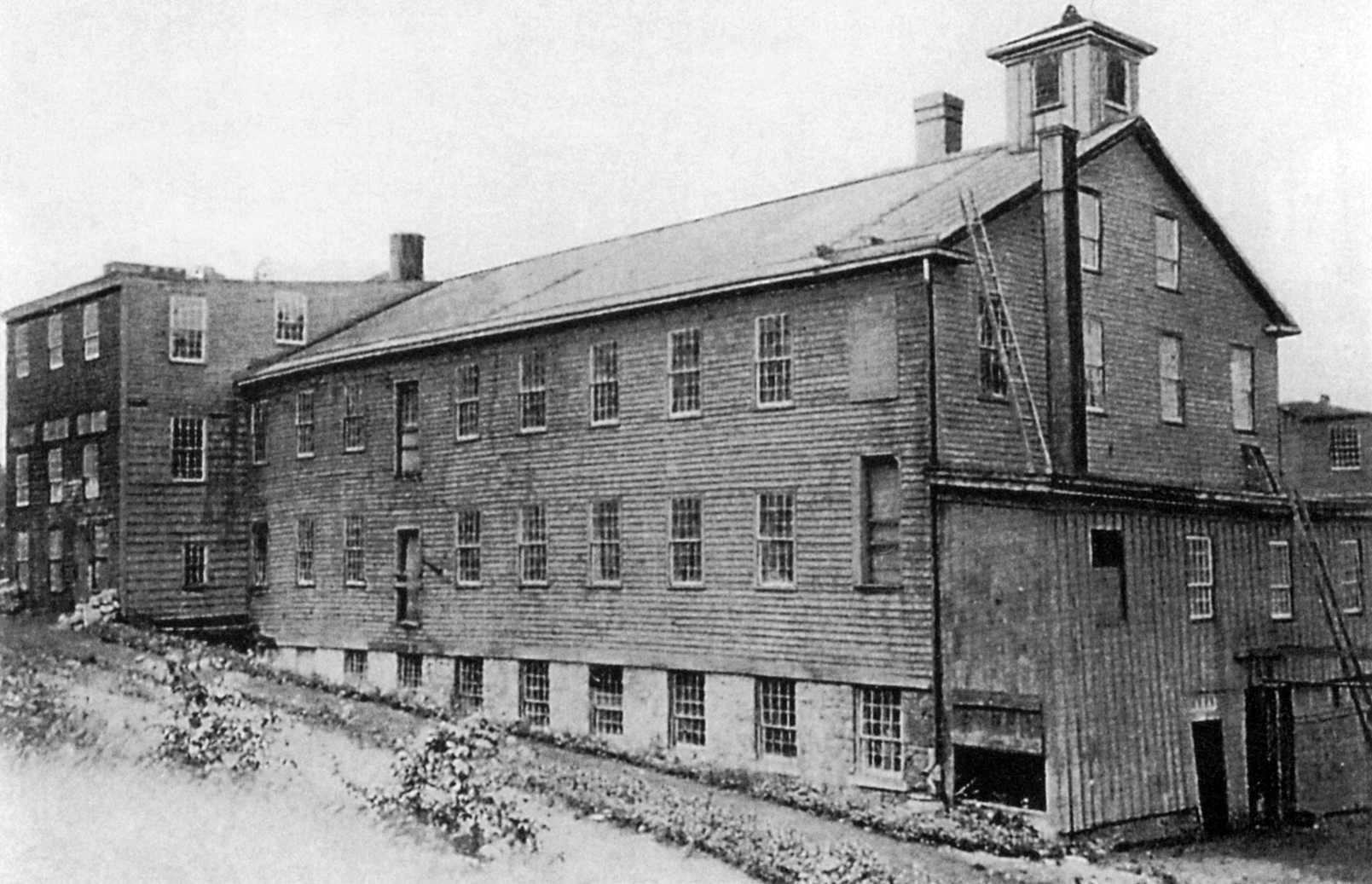
- Remington factory circa 1840
- Type: Corporation (previously private, then partnership)
- Industry: Firearms, mechanical consumer products (typewriters)
- Founded: Ilion, New York, U.S. (1816)
- Founder: Eliphalet Remington II
- Fate: Purchased
- Successor: Remington Arms Co. Standard Typewriter Manufacturing Company later Remington Typewriter Company and Remington Rand
- Area served: Worldwide
- Products: Firearms-pistols, rifles, shotguns Typewriters

E. Remington & Sons (1816–1888) was a manufacturer of firearms and typewriters. Founded in 1816 by Eliphalet Remington II in Ilion, New York, on March 1, 1873, it became known for manufacturing the first commercial typewriter.

== History ==
=== Early years ===
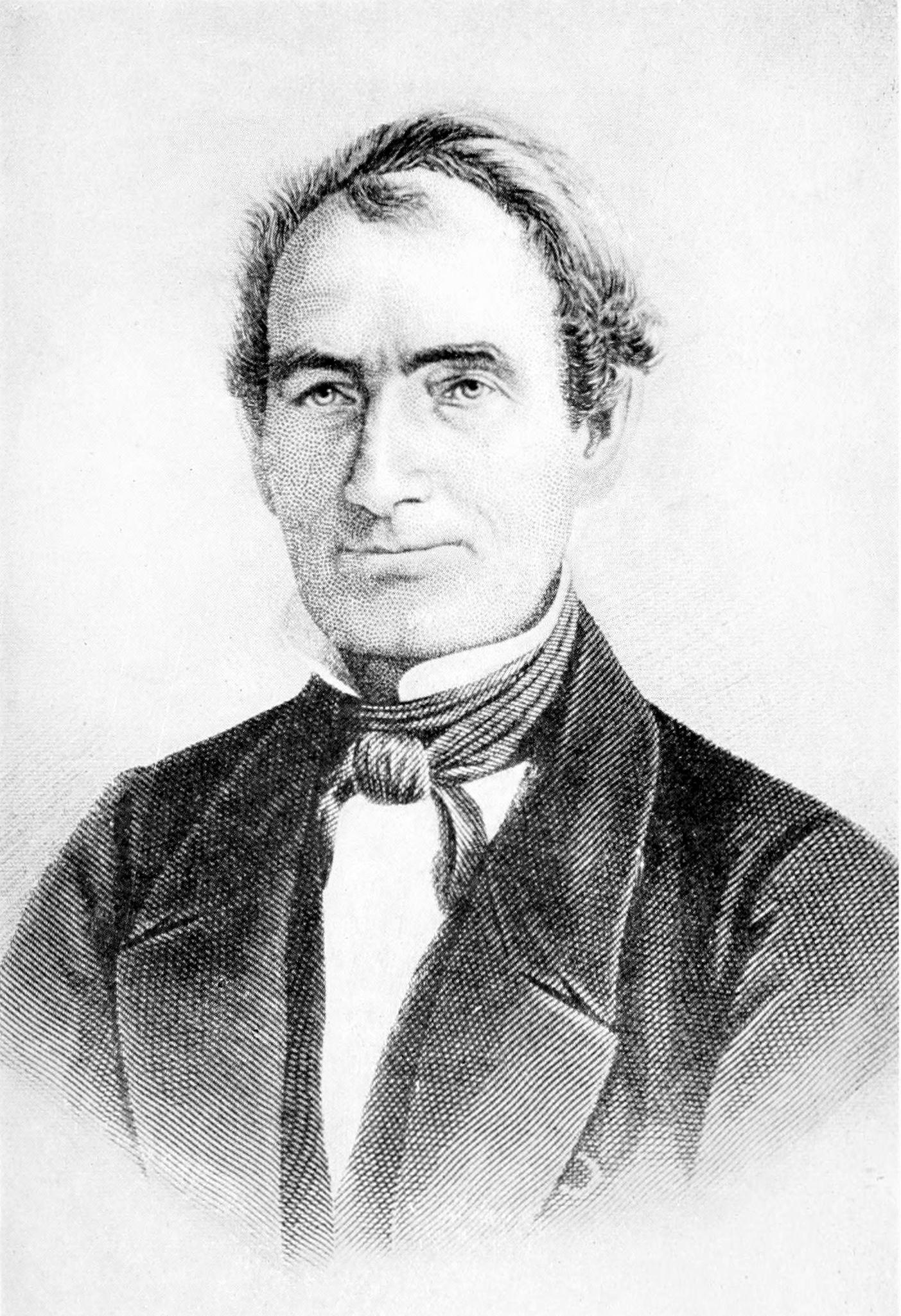
Eliphalet Remington II

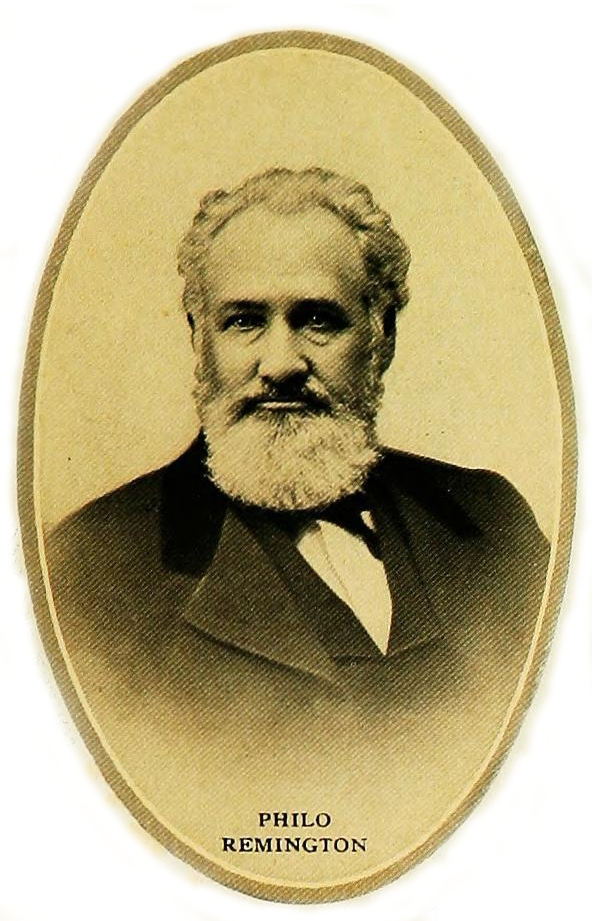
Philo Remington

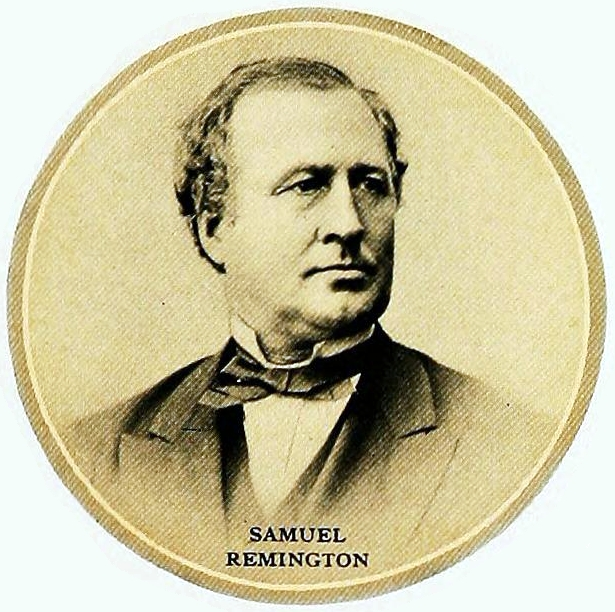
Samuel Remington

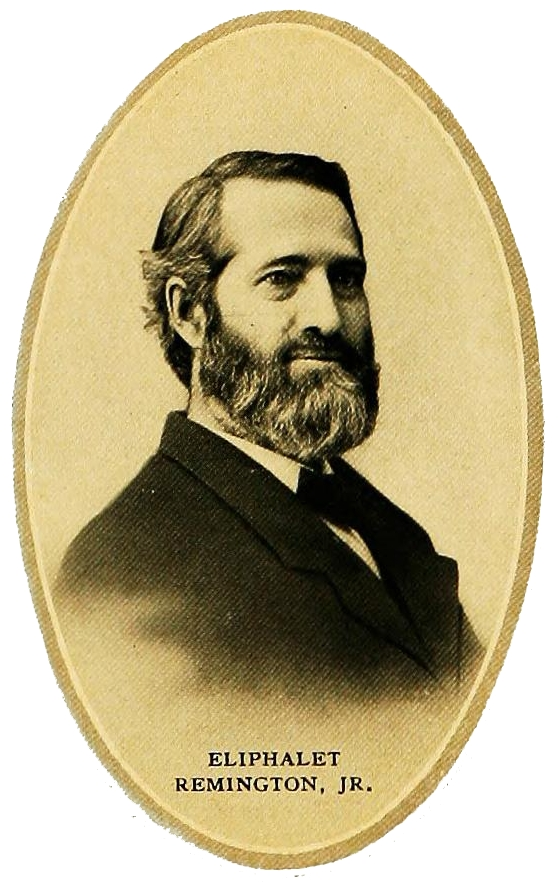
Eliphalet Remington III

There are two versions of the origin story of the first Remington rifle barrel. One holds that the younger Remington wanted to purchase a rifle and lacked the money to buy one, so he made his own. The other states that he forged a barrel from wrought iron to see if he could build a better rifle than he could buy. Both versions have him taking the barrel to a gunsmith to have it rifled.

Eliphalet II forged his first rifle barrel as a young blacksmith in 1816 and finished second place in a local shooting match with it. Despite not winning the match, he proceeded to make barrels to meet the growing demand for flintlock rifles in the Mohawk Valley. With the completion of the Erie Canal, connecting Buffalo with Albany, commerce in the Mohawk Valley expanded remarkably, as did the demand for rifle barrels.

To meet the increased demand for rifle barrels, in 1828 the Remingtons moved their forge and foundry from its rural setting to 100 acres (0.40 km^{2}) of land they had purchased astride the canal and abutting the Mohawk River near a town then called Morgan's Landing (later Ilion), New York. The move coincided with the elder Eliphalet's death, and Eliphalet II assumed control of the business.

In 1839 Eliphalet was joined by his oldest son, Philo Remington (to make the business "E. Remington & Son"); in 1845, his second son, Samuel, also joined the company, afterward called "E. Remington & Sons". Remington's third son, Eliphalet Remington III, would later join the company as well. During this period, the Remingtons specialized almost exclusively in manufacturing rifle barrels. These barrels, marked with the distinctive "REMINGTON" stamp near their breeches, were recognized for their quality and reasonable price. Many, if not most, of the independent gunsmiths in the Mohawk Valley purchased completed (but not rifled) barrels from Remington and assembled them into firearms custom ordered by their customers. As demand increased, the Remingtons added other parts to their inventory, first percussion locks made in Birmingham, England but marked with their stamp "REMINGTON", and later sets of brass gun furniture, including trigger guards, butt plates, and patch boxes. After 1846, martial longarm and then revolver production dominated the company's workforce.

In 1841, Eliphalet Remington negotiated his first firearms contract, being commissioned by the United States Army Ordinanace Department to manufacture 5,000 Model 1841 Mississippi rifles. Several months after this, he received a contract from the United States government to manufacture 1,000 Jenks breech loading carbines, the first complete guns to be manufactured by his company. By 1847, Remington Arms Company supplied the United States Navy with its first-ever breech-loading rifle.

In 1848, the company purchased gun-making machinery from the Ames Manufacturing Company of Chicopee, Massachusetts and took over a contract for Jenks breechloading percussion carbines for the U.S. Navy. Remington supplied the U.S. Navy with its first breech-loading rifle. Remington supplied the U.S. Army with rifles in the Mexican–American War (1846 to 1848). Shortly after, Remington took over a defaulted contract (by John Griffith of Cincinnati) for 5,000 U.S. Model 1841 Percussion Mississippi rifles. Based on the success of filling these orders, subsequent contracts followed in the 1850s.

By 1847, Ephialet Remington's sons Philo, Samuel, and Eliphalet III became partners in his company, which was renamed E. Remington & Sons.

Samuel Colt's patent on his revolver design had, for many years, effectively prevented Remington and all other manufacturers (besides Colt) from manufacturing their own revolvers. The expiration of Colt's patent in 1857 allowed the company to competitively manufacture revolvers. Soon after, the company began manufacturing the Remington Model 1858 (also known as the "Remington-Beals" revolver), which was designed by Fordyce Beals. Beals and the company shared 1856 and 1857 patents related to the firearm. Beals would maintain his relationship with the company for many years, designing many of its most successful firearms.

The company patented a design for a cane gun (a gun disguised as a walking cane) in 1859.

=== American Civil War ===
After Eliphalet II's death in 1861, the three sons assumed leadership of the company, with Philo becoming the company's new president Samuel working as its contract negotiator and purchasing agent, and Eliphalet III directing the company's office.

During the Civil War, Remington enjoyed Union military contracts for rifles, carbines, .36 caliber revolvers, and .44 caliber revolvers. One of the revolvers that the company manufactured for the government was the 1863 Remington New Model Army Revolver, a .44 caliber cap and ball revolver. One of the rifles that the company manufactured was the Remington Model 1862/1863 Contract Rifle, commonly known as the "Zouave" and the Hammer Shotgun.

=== Post-war years ===
After the war, the United States military cancelled contracts for new arms, and the company's arms sales initially declined severely. This caused its revenue to dissipate considerably. Faced with impending fiscal ruin in the initial years after the war, the original partnership was folded, with a new joint-stock company bearing its same name being founded incorporated in 1865. To compensate for decreased firearms sales, the company branched into the manufacture of additional products, including agricultural tools, typewriters, and sewing machines.

Soon after the Civil War, the company began production of the New Model Pocket Revolver, designed by inventor Joseph Rider, in aims of replacing military sales with civilian sales. This was ultimately the final model of percussion revolver that the company would produce.

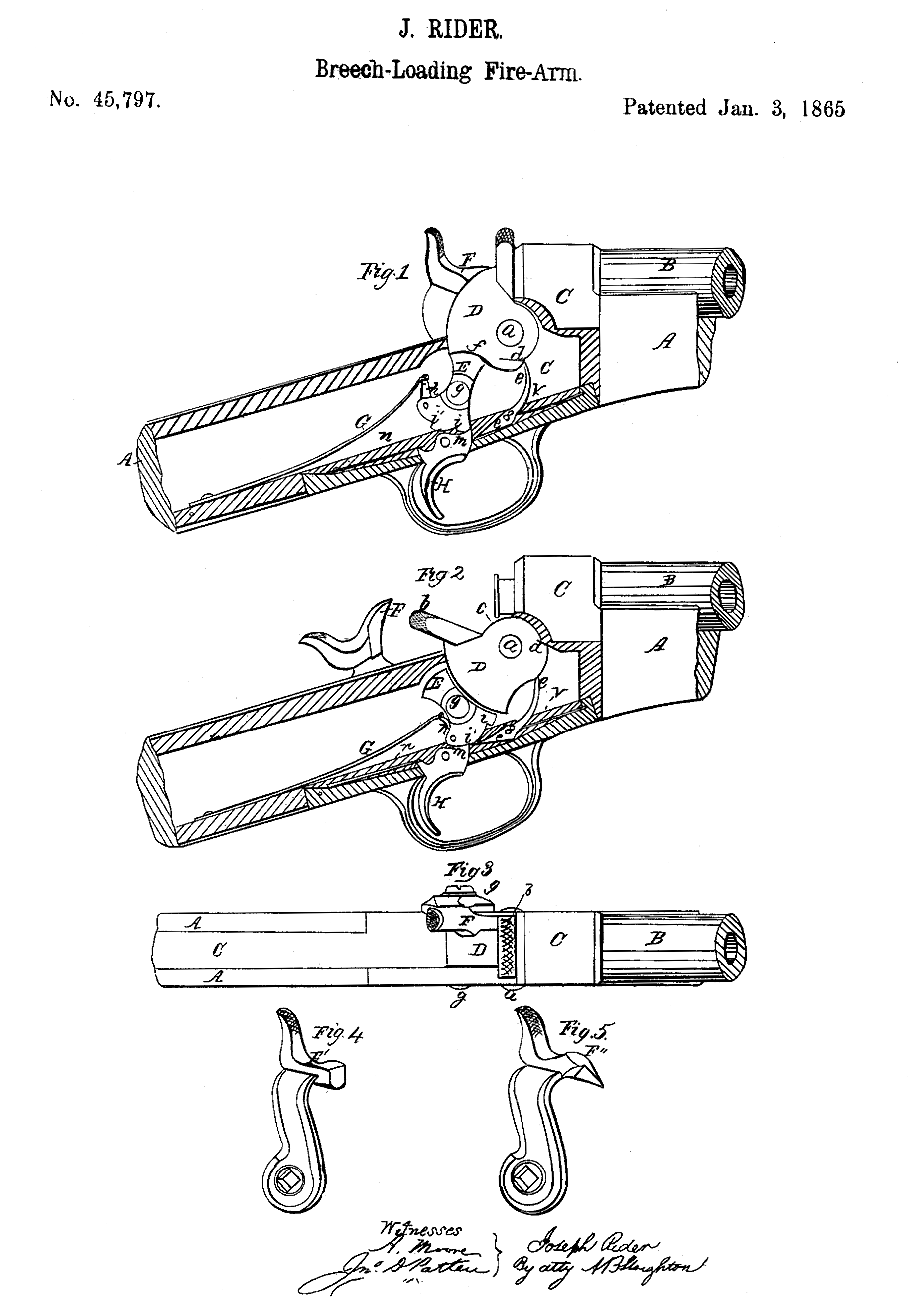
1865 patent for a rolling block breech, designed by Joseph Rider

Also in 1865 the company and Rider jointly patented a rolling block breechloading mechanism that Rider had designed. The company utilized this design on both military and civilian single-shot rifles. Firearms with Rider's mechanism became highly popular, and the company's firearms sales recovered in large part thanks to it. In tandem with Samuel Remington's skill at marketing and sales, this design was a key reason the company’s firearm sales were able to recover and keep afloat into the 1880s. Additionally, a breechloading system designed by Lewis L. Hepburn was added to Remington’s line of firearms for high quality target rifles.

In the 1866, the company began manufacturing the Model 95, a derringer offered in several models and variations. These were marketed to city-dwelling consumers. In 1875, the company began production of the Model 1875, a .45 and .44-40 caliber revolver. This was marketed towards consumers in the American West, having been developed with the intention of offering products competitive with Colt’s popular Single Action Army and M1878 revolvers introduced two years prior. However, the Model 1875 failed to approach the success of its Colt-manufactured competitors.

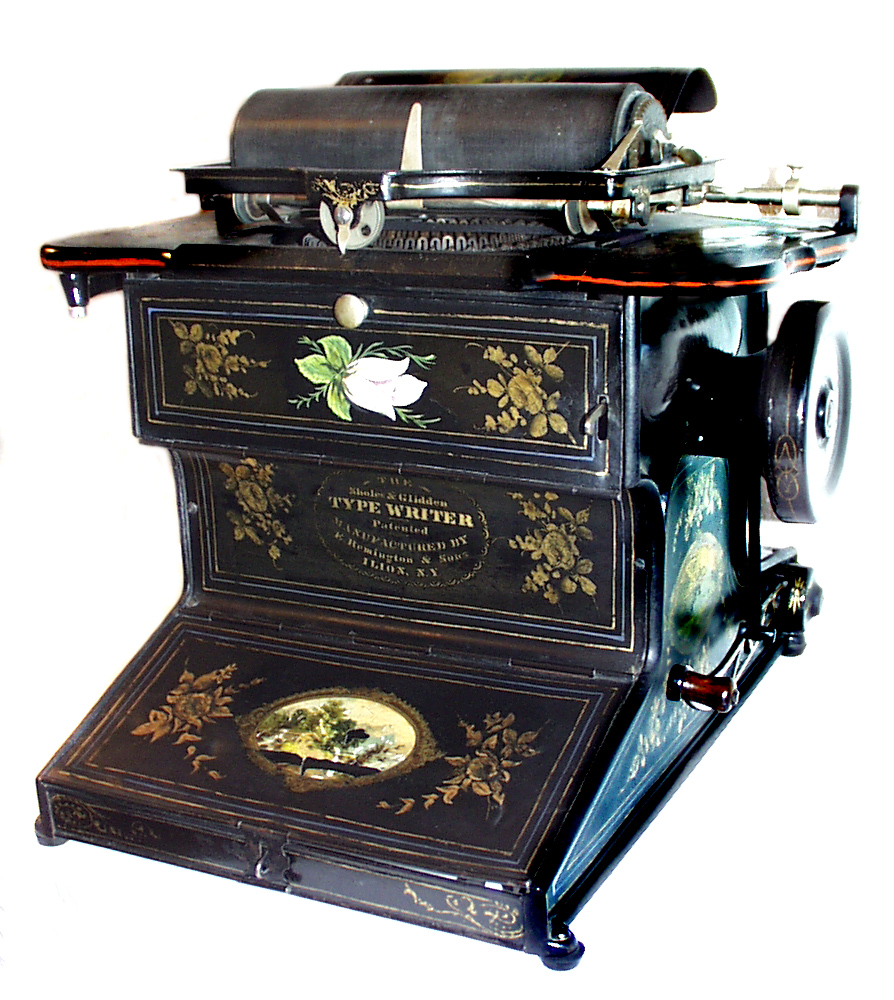
Sholes & Glidden Typewriter, 1876

On June 23, 1868, a patent was granted to Christopher Sholes, Carlos Glidden, and Samuel W. Soule for a "Type-Writer" which was eventually developed into the Sholes and Glidden typewriter, the first device that allowed an operator to type substantially faster than a person could write by hand. The patent (U.S. 79,265) was sold for $12,000 to Densmore and Yost, who agreed with E. Remington and Sons (then famous as a manufacturer of sewing machines) to commercialize what was known as the Sholes and Glidden Type-Writer. Remington started production of their first typewriter on March 1, 1873, in Ilion, New York. The Type-Writer introduced the QWERTY, designed by Sholes, and the success of the follow-up Remington No. 2 of 1878 – the first typewriter to include both upper and lower case letters via a shift key – led to the popularity of the QWERTY layout.

Remington continued to fulfill new orders by the United States Army, and expanded its business reach overseas. Samuel Remington, working as the company's European agent, secured the company large and lucrative weapons manufacture contracts with the governments of several foreign nations. The company began fulfilling orders for the governments of Denmark, Egypt France, Spain, and Sweden. Amid the Franco-Prussian War, Samuel Remington was able to secure more than $11 million (approximately $280 million, when adjusted for inflation) worth of contracts from the French government.

By the 1870s, the company was manufacturing a greater number of firearms than the entire firearms industry of England. It employed 1,850 workers, who (for periods of time) averaged a daily production of 1,400 rifles and 200 revolvers.

In the 1870s, Remington developed a reputation for fostering invention beyond just firearms, and employed many inventors. During the 1870s and 1880s, there were periods where the company averaged four new patents per week. Philo Remington fostered invention, hearing pitches from inventors at his personal residence and deciding whether the company would greenlight their ideas. The company's armory operation would help in setting-up the patenting and production of greenlit products. In the late 1880s, Remington began manufacturing specialized sewing machines. Its manufacture of machines and devices expanded to typewriters, electrical lighting systems, pillmaking and medicine-tablet manufacturing equipment, cigarmaking machines, lathes, burglar alarms, gas-powered engines, deep-well pumps. These products were developed at its armory, but were thereafter manufactured by sub-contractors or by specialized subsidiary companies. One invention the company created was a "gun" device meant for use in firefighting, which would eject a lifeline up to 200 yards up the height of a building in order to aid in evacuating upper floors. The company also continued to innovate firearms designs. During this period, the James P. Lee military rifle (a bolt-action gun type) was first introduced. A rapid-fire naval gun was also developed (a popular double-barreled shotgun design, and a precursor to modern machine guns).

The company exhibited its typewriters and sewing machines at the Centennial Exposition in Philadelphia in 1876.

In 1882, Samuel Remington died, and his share of the company was acquired by Philo Remington.

=== Decline ===
Towards the late 1880s, international orders decreased. In order to keep its employees from layoffs, the company focused heavily in its efforts to diversify its manufacture into non-firearms products. Similar to firearms, the company managed to innovate a number of technologies for such products. The company ventured into the manufacture of motor vehicles. It fulfilled a contract to manufacture 100 Baxter steam cars (steam-powered streetcars capable of producing 25 horsepower and traveling in excess of 15 miles per hour). Remington later became the first company to manufacture a Baxter canal steamboat. The company built the first 100 velocipedes produced in the United States, marking an early milestone for the American bicycle manufacturing. Remington later offered tandem bicycle and two-seater bicycle models.

While the company was able to develop the first commercially successful typewriter, its sales were still insufficient to make up for the decreased demand for firearms and the cost sunk into developing new products to diversify the company's offerings. In 1886, the company found itself unable to meet its obligations to creditors and entered receivership. That year, the company sold their typewriter sector to the Standard Typewriter Manufacturing Company.

By 1888, the company was facing fiscal ruin, and was acquired jointly by a group led by Marcellus Hartley (a partner in Schuyler, Hartley and Graham; and owner of the Union Metallic Cartridge Company), and the Winchester Repeating Arms Company. These two partners acquired equal shares of the company.

== Successor companies ==
=== Remington Arms ===
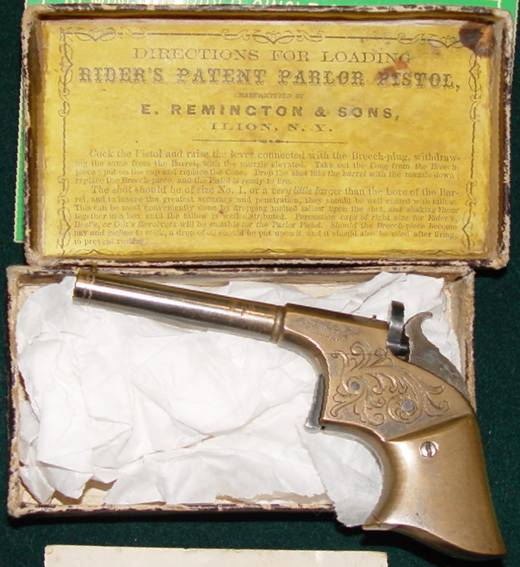
Remington-Rider

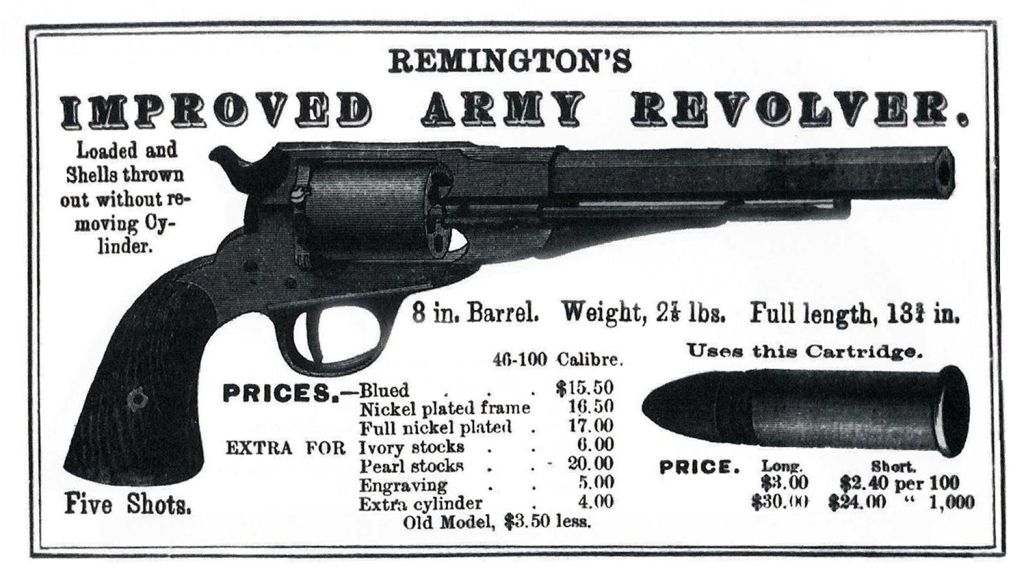
Remington .46 Conversion display

On March 7, 1888, ownership of E. Remington & Sons left possession of the Remington family, with the company being sold to new owners Marcellus Hartley of New York, New York, and the Winchester Repeating Arms Company of New Haven, Connecticut. After this purchase, the business's name was formally changed to the Remington Arms Company.

Remington, in addition, was one of the most successful gun manufacturers in the world arms trade between 1867 and 1900, specifically through the export of the Remington Rolling Block action rifle. This single-shot, large-caliber black-powder cartridge rifle was exported in the millions all over the world, including shipments to France, Egypt, Denmark, Norway, Sweden, Belgium, Argentina, Mexico, and the Papal States. It was a critical gun supplier of small arms used by the United States government in World War I (U.S. involvement 1917 to 1918) and World War II (U.S. involvement 1941 to 1945)

=== Remington Typewriter Company ===
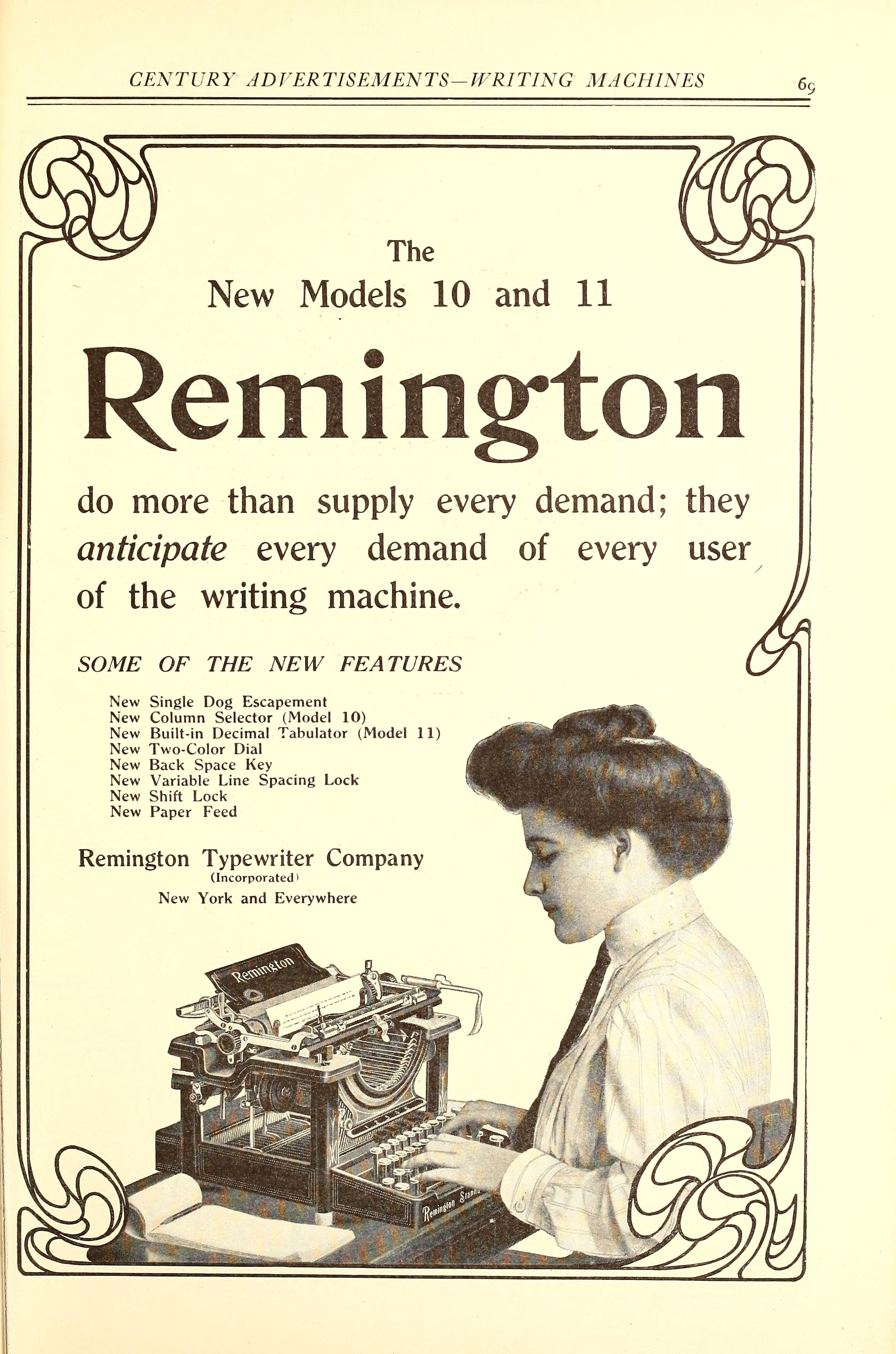
1909 advertisement for the Remington No. 10 and 11

In 1886, E. Remington and Sons sold its typewriter business to the Standard Typewriter Manufacturing Company, Inc. Included were the rights to use the Remington name. The buyers were William O. Wyckoff, Harry H. Benedict, and Clarence Seamans, all of whom worked for Remington.

The Standard Typewriter Manufacturing Company merged with the Rand Kardex Corporation in 1927 to form Remington-Rand. They continued to be a major manufacturer in the typewriter industry throughout the 20th century. The company continued to manufacture office equipment, and later became a major computer company, as well as manufacturing electric razors. In 1955, it was acquired by Sperry to form Sperry Rand. Among the divisions of the company that later were spun off was Remington Products.

== See also ==
- List of Remington models
