= Sophia Holmes =

American civil servant

Sophia Brown Holmes
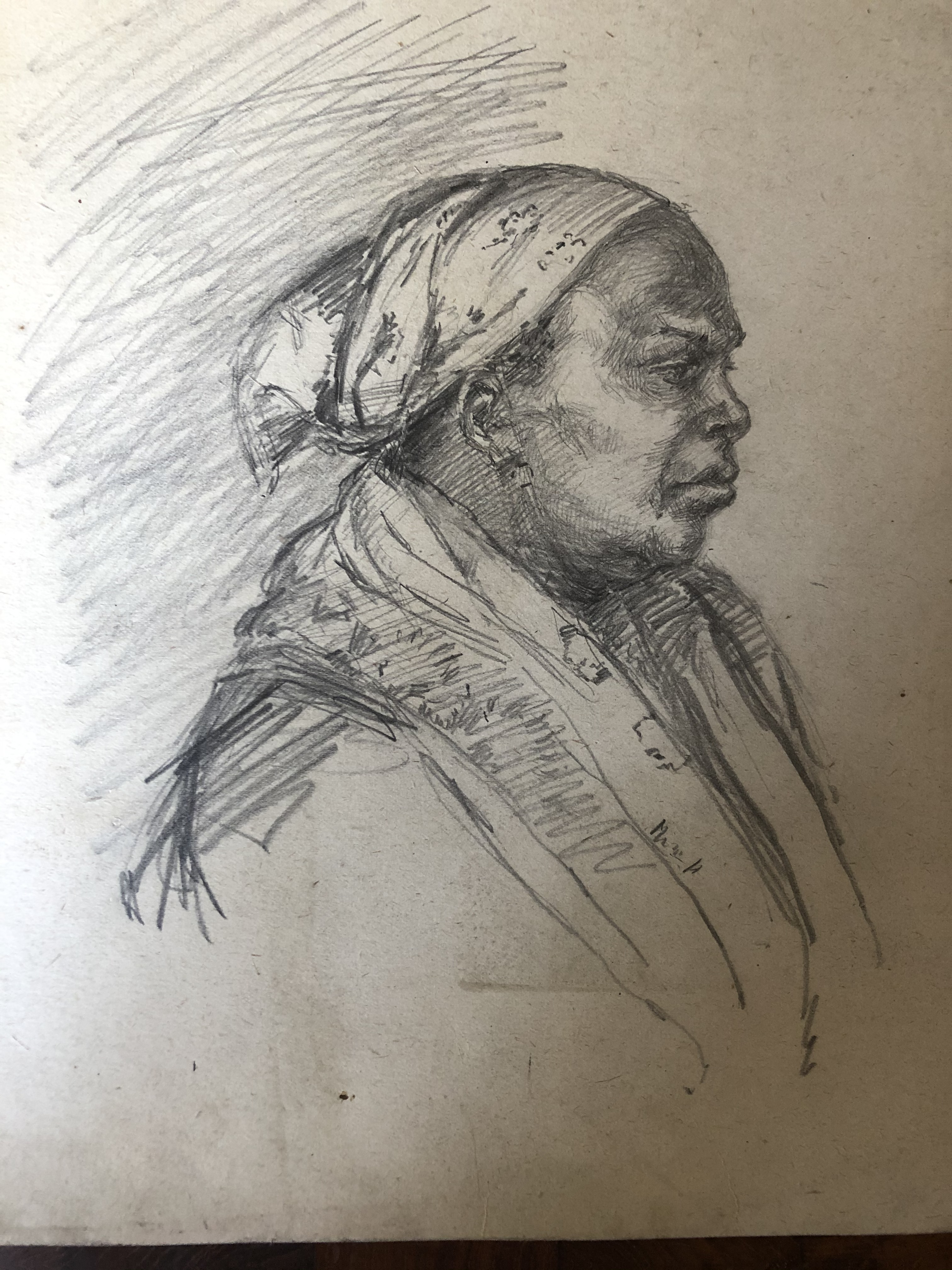
- Sophia Brown Holmes, 1892
- Born: c. 1825-1830; Washington, D.C., United States
- Died: October 10, 1900; Washington, D.C., United States
- Occupation(s): Messenger, Department of Issues, United States Department of the Treasury
- Known for: She was the first Black woman to be hired by the United States Federal government
- Notable work: Preventing a massive theft of funds from the U.S. Department of the Treasury in 1862

Sophia Brown Holmes (c.1825 – October 10, 1900) was an American federal civil servant who was the first Black/African-American woman hired by the United States Federal government.

== Biography ==
Holmes was born between 1825 and 1830 in Washington, D.C. In 1852, as a free woman, she married Melchoir Malachi Holmes, an enslaved man. In 1854, her husband was to be sold at auction and sent to the South. However, through the efforts of abolitionist Gerrit Smith Melchoir was bought by William Seaton, the editor of the National Intelligencer and later mayor of Washington D.C., for $1000. Seaton then paid Melchoir $25 a month in wages and Sophia $25 a month for washing in credit towards the debt for Melchoir's freedom. By 1861, the couple had raised sufficient funds to purchase his freedom. While his emancipation papers were being processed, he enlisted in the Union Army under Col. French's regiment, 4th Maine Company H, as a servant to Captain George J. Burns. During the First Battle of Bull Run, Melchoir was killed, reportedly taking Burns' place on the battlefield after Burns was injured.

=== Civil Service Employment ===
Following her husband's death in 1861, Holmes, through the advocacy of Senator Henry Wilson and James G. Blaine, among others, was provided employment in the United States Treasury Central Department of Issue Office as a janitress for $15 a month under Secretary of the Treasury Francis Spinner. Holmes was the first African American woman hired into formal federal employment.

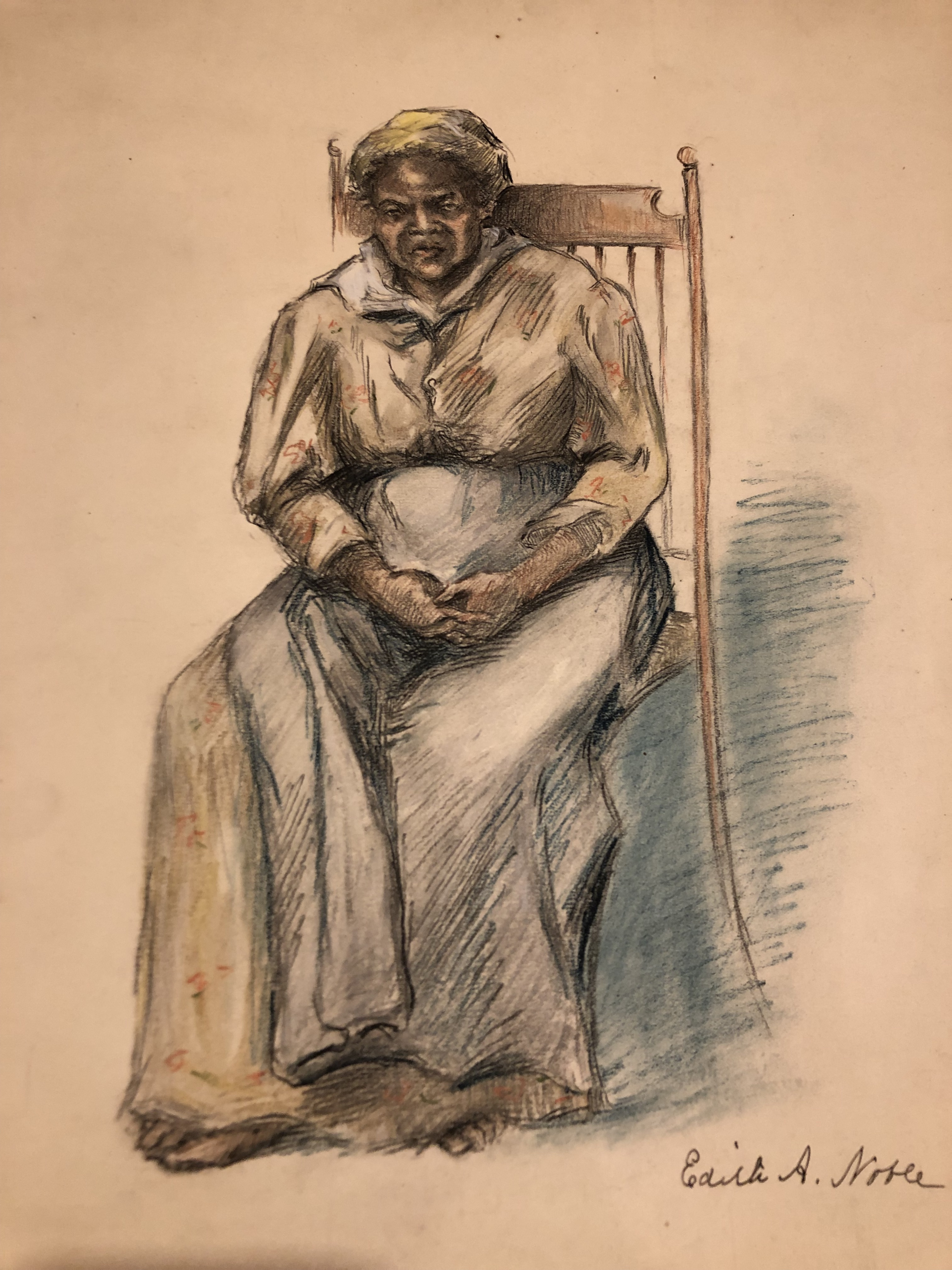
Sophia Brown Holmes, 1892. By Edith Ainslie Noble.

In 1862, at the beginning of her initial tenure as an employee for the Treasury, Holmes prevented a massive theft of funds. Her duties at the Treasury Department "consisted of sweeping, scrubbing, dusting, emptying baskets and boxes of waste papers." One evening, as Holmes was cleaning, she discovered a box packed with bills, "some as large as $1,000." Holmes informed Secretary Spinner of her find. This prevention of a major theft of more than $200,000 was described in numerous newspaper articles in great detail in later years and upon her death.

=== Recognition ===
Holmes' prevention of a major theft from the federal government was one of the largest theft preventions in American history. Following this event, Holmes received an official commendation from President Lincoln and a lifetime executive appointment as a messenger for the Department of Issues. She was the first Black/African American woman officially appointed to the United States' Government Service.

By 1870 she had been promoted to the position of assistant messenger. In all, Holmes worked for the Treasury Department for 32 years under nine different administrations

=== Death ===
Holmes died on October 10, 1900, in Washington, D.C. She was originally interred at the Harmony Cemetery in Washington D.C., an African American cemetery that was established during the early nineteenth century. Her remains were later disinterred when the cemetery closed and reinterred at the National Harmony Memorial Park.

== See also ==
- Jennie Douglas, the first woman officially hired to work for at the U.S. Treasury
