= Vickerman Hill =

Mountain in New York, United States

- Location within New York Location within the United States

Highest point
- Elevation: 1,142 feet (348 m)
- Coordinates: 42°58′44″N 75°00′54″W

Geography
- Location: S of Mohawk, New York, U.S.
- Topo map: USGS Millers Mills

Vickerman Hill is a summit located in the Central New York Region of New York located in the Town of German Flatts in Herkimer County, south of Mohawk.
