= Thomas Richardson House =

Historic house in New York, United States

- U.S. National Register of Historic Places
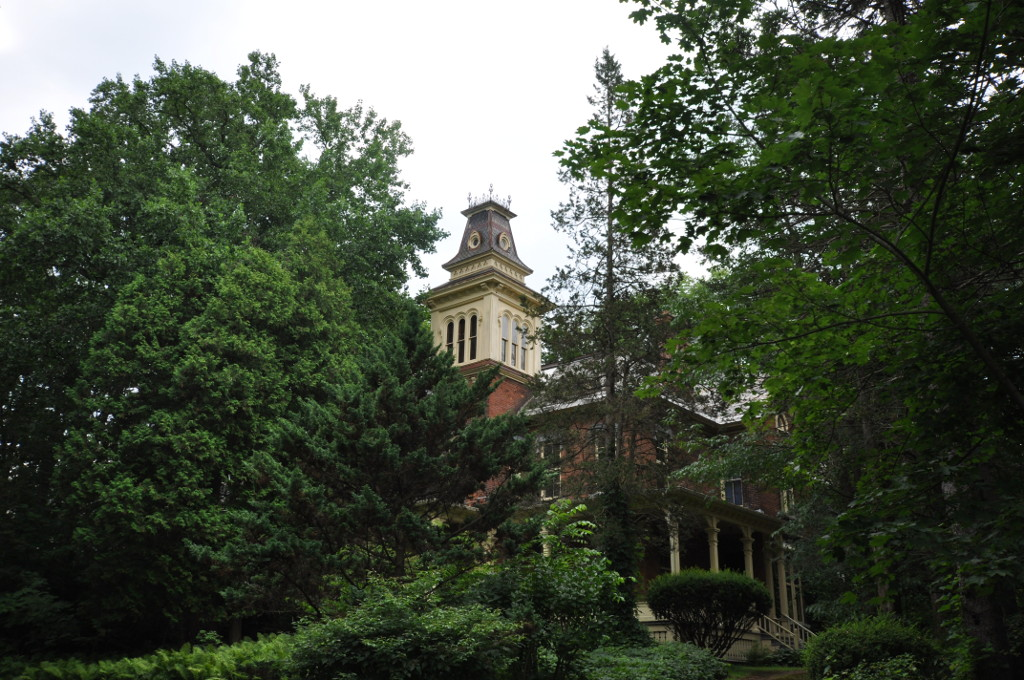

- Location within New York Location within the United States
- Location: 317 W. Main St., Ilion, New York
- Coordinates: 43°1′11″N 75°2′52″W
- Area: 4.4 acres (1.8 ha)
- Built: 1873
- Architectural style: Italianate
- NRHP reference No.: 84002400
- Added to NRHP: September 7, 1984

Thomas Richardson House is a historic home located at Ilion in Herkimer County, New York. It was built around 1873, and is a brick structure with an asymmetrical rectangular plan in the Italianate style. The two-story main block has a hipped roof and 3 two-story projecting bays with clipped gable roofs covered in slate. It features a three-story tower with a two-tiered, concave mansard roof. The property includes the original carriage house and landscaping.

It was listed on the National Register of Historic Places in 1984.

In 2021 it was sold to YouTube and Netflix personality Christine McConnell.
