= Shoemaker Hill =

Mountain in New York, United States

- Location within New York Location within the United States

Highest point
- Elevation: 1,394 feet (425 m)
- Coordinates: 42°59′33″N 74°55′02″W, 43°00′06″N 74°55′24″W

Geography
- Location: E of Mohawk, New York, U.S.
- Topo map: USGS Jordanville

Shoemaker Hill is a summit located in Central New York Region of New York located in the Town of German Flatts in Herkimer County, east of Mohawk.
