= German Flatts, New York =

Town in Herkimer County, New York, US

- Town
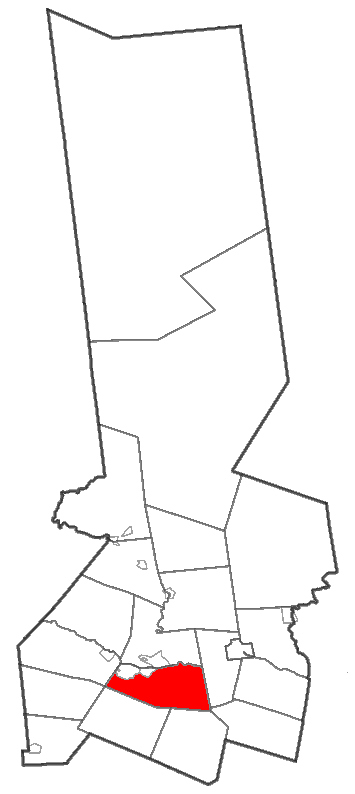
- Location of German Flatts in Herkimer County

- Location within New York Location within the United States
- Coordinates: 43°0′19″N 75°0′47″W
- Country: United States
- State: New York
- County: Herkimer

Government
  - Type: Town Council
  - Town Supervisor: Frank P. Spatto (R)
  - Town Council: Members' List: • Sam Geloso (R); • Fay G. Davis (R); • Robert K. Watkins (R); • Fred Markwardt (R)

Area
  - Total: 34.19 sq mi (88.56 km^{2})
  - Land: 33.70 sq mi (87.27 km^{2})
  - Water: 0.50 sq mi (1.29 km^{2})
- Elevation: 971 ft (296 m)

Population (2020)
  - Total: 12,263
- Time zone: UTC-5 (Eastern (EST))
  - Summer (DST): UTC-4 (EDT)
- ZIP Codes: 13357 (Ilion); 13407 (Mohawk)
- Area code: 315
- FIPS code: 36-043-28750
- GNIS feature ID: 0978997
- Website: germanflatts.org

German Flatts is a town in Herkimer County, New York, United States. The population was 12,263 at the 2020 census down from 13,258 at the 2010 census.

The town is in the southern part of Herkimer County, on the south side of the Mohawk River, across from the village of Herkimer. The town includes the villages of Ilion and Mohawk.

== History ==
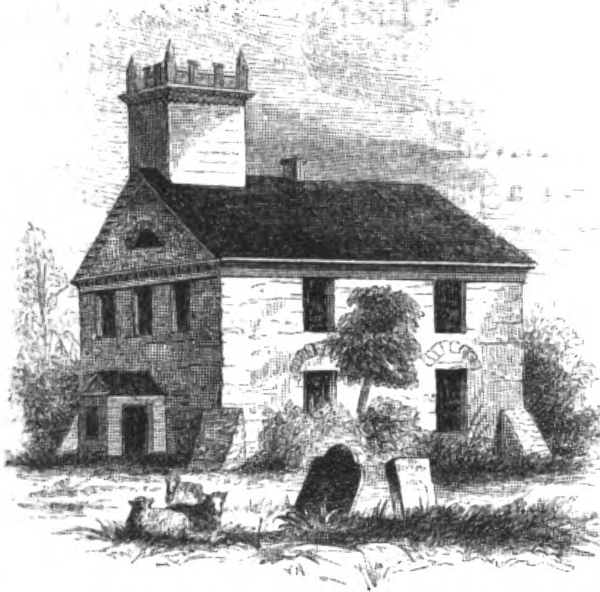
The Old Stone Church after alterations in 1811 added the second story and steeple. The church was originally built in 1787 with a contribution from Sir William Johnson.

=== Herkimer ===
This was one of the original areas of the Burnetsfield Patent in the province of New York, where in 1722–1723, Governor William Burnet granted Palatine German immigrants leases to purchase land from the Mohawk, the powerful eastern nation of the Iroquois Confederacy. It was the first land sold to Europeans west of Schenectady. During the 18th-century warfare in the valley, the village was attacked by French and Iroquois forces during the French and Indian War (Seven Years' War), and many women and children were taken to Canada as captives.

On September 17, 1778, Mohawk chief and Loyalist leader Joseph Brant led a force of 150 Iroquois and 300 Loyalists under the command of Captain William Caldwell in a surprise attack on the area of German Flatts. German Flatts, now known as Little Falls, Fort Herkimer, Mohawk, and Ilion, was left virtually undefended by Patriot troops prior to the raid.

The Iroquois and Loyalist raiders captured hundreds of head of cattle and sheep before setting fire to every house, barn and mill in German Flatts. Despite the complete destruction of the town, including 63 houses, 57 barns, three gristmills and one sawmill, only three men were killed. The day before, four Patriot scouts had run into the Loyalists while on reconnaissance. Though only one, Adam Helmer, survived the encounter, he ran the 35 miles (56 km) back to the village of German Flatts to warn the residents.

As a result, the vast majority of the town's people were able to seek safety in the area's forts, Herkimer and Dayton, and survived the destruction of their town. Three Demuth children were captured playing outside the fort and taken by the raiders. After the war in an exchange of prisoners, the two eldest, Catherine and George, returned to their family. The youngest, Samuel, had become assimilated to his Onondaga family and chose to remain with them. As an adult, he served as an interpreter for the Iroquois and settlers in the valley.

The town was set apart in the now defunct Tryon County, which was broken up into Montgomery and other counties after the Revolutionary War. It was established as a town in 1788 before the formation of Herkimer County. The area that was to become the town had also been called "German Flatts".

=== Towns ===
In 1791, when Herkimer County was established, German Flatts was one of the three original towns. Three new towns were created from German Flatts in 1792: Frankfort, Litchfield, and Warren. Another part of German Flatts was used in 1829 to form part of the town of Little Falls, which developed on both sides of the Mohawk River at the falls.

== Geography ==
According to the United States Census Bureau, the town of German Flatts has a total area of 34.2 square miles (88.6 km^{2}), of which 33.7 square miles (87.3 km^{2}) are land and 0.50 square miles (1.3 km^{2}), or 1.46%, are water.

The northern town line is marked by the Mohawk River and the Erie Canal. The village of Ilion is in the northwestern corner of the town, and the village of Mohawk is farther east, along the northern town line.

The New York State Thruway (Interstate 90) crosses the northeast part of the town. New York State Route 5S passes through the northern part of German Flatts and intersects New York State Route 28 in Mohawk village. New York State Route 168 runs southeasterly through the town from Mohawk village.

== Demographics ==
Historical population
Census	Pop.	Note	%±
1820	2,665		—
1830	2,466		−7.5%
1840	3,245		31.6%
1850	3,578		10.3%
1860	3,940		10.1%
1870	5,718		45.1%
1880	6,746		18.0%
1890	7,255		7.5%
1900	8,663		19.4%
1910	10,160		17.3%
1920	14,089		38.7%
1930	13,923		−1.2%
1940	13,053		−6.2%
1950	14,106		8.1%
1960	15,742		11.6%
1970	15,430		−2.0%
1980	14,981		−2.9%
1990	14,345		−4.2%
2000	13,629		−5.0%
2010	13,258		−2.7%
2020	12,263		−7.5%
2024 (est.)	12,077		−1.5%
U.S. Decennial Census

As of the census of 2000, there were 13,629 people, 5,483 households, and 3,591 families residing in the town. The population density was 403.9 inhabitants per square mile (155.9/km^{2}). There were 5,832 housing units at an average density of 172.8 per square mile (66.7/km^{2}). The racial makeup of the town was 97.87% White, 0.59% African American, 0.11% Native American, 0.18% Asian, 0.01% Pacific Islander, 0.20% from other races, and 1.04% from two or more races. Hispanic or Latino of any race were 1.44% of the population.

There were 5,483 households, out of which 31.4% had children under the age of 18 living with them, 48.6% were married couples living together, 12.2% had a female householder with no husband present, and 34.5% were non-families. 28.8% of all households were made up of individuals, and 14.2% had someone living alone who was 65 years of age or older. The average household size was 2.45 and the average family size was 3.00.

In the town, the population was spread out, with 25.2% under the age of 18, 8.3% from 18 to 24, 26.7% from 25 to 44, 23.4% from 45 to 64, and 16.4% who were 65 years of age or older. The median age was 38 years. For every 100 females, there were 88.7 males. For every 100 females age 18 and over, there were 85.4 males.

The median income for a household in the town was $32,772, and the median income for a family was $39,380. Males had a median income of $29,973 versus $21,425 for females. The per capita income for the town was $14,870. About 11.1% of families and 13.7% of the population were below the poverty line, including 16.8% of those under age 18 and 11.3% of those age 65 or over.

== Communities and locations ==
- Bell Hill – An elevation located south of Ilion.
- Days Rock – A hamlet near the center of the town on NY-168.
- Edicks – A hamlet in the southeastern part of the town on County Road 68.
- Fort Herkimer – A hamlet near the northern town line and the Mohawk River.
- Ilion – The Village of Ilion is at the northwestern border of German Flatts, near the Mohawk River on NY-5S.
- Kinne Corners – A location on the western town line.
- Mohawk – The Village of Mohawk is at the northern border of the town on NY-5S.
- North Ilion – A community located north of Ilion village, next to the Mohawk River.
- Rock Hill – An elevation in the southeastern part of German Flatts.
- Russell Park – A location southwest of Mohawk village.
- Shoemaker Hill – A mountain range extending from east of Mohawk to Wrights Corners in the Town of Little Falls.
- South Ilion – A hamlet in the southeastern part of the town on NY-51.
- Vickerman Hill – An elevation located south of Mohawk.

== Notable people ==
- Adam Helmer (c.1754 – 1830), American Revolutionary War hero
- Elias Root (1806 – 1880), American businessman and politician
- Francis E. Spinner (1802 – 1890), Treasurer of the United States from 1861 to 1875
- Inez Harrington Whitfield (1867 – 1951), botanical watercolor artist

== In popular culture ==
- Walter D. Edmonds' 1936 novel Drums Along the Mohawk recounts the story of Adam Helmer's run to save the village during the Revolutionary War, together with an overview of the Germans' historic colonial settlement along the river.
- It was adapted as a film Drums Along the Mohawk, released in 1939 and directed by John Ford.
