= 1857 Chicago mayoral election =

Chicago mayoral election, 1857
- March 3, 1857
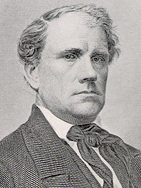

Candidate	John Wentworth	Benjamin Carver
Party	Republican	Democratic
Popular vote	5,933	4,842
Percentage	55.06%	44.94%
Mayor before election
Thomas Dyer
Democratic
Elected mayor
John Wentworth
Republican

In the 1857 Chicago mayoral election, Republican nominee John Wentworth defeated Democratic nominee Benjamin Carver by a ten-point margin.

The election was held on March 3.

== Background ==
The Democratic Party were coming off of the success of their presidential ticket in November 1856 (both nationally, as well as in Illinois). At a celebratory bonfire held across from the Tremont House, Stephen A. Douglas delivered a speech predicting a Democratic victory in the coming municipal elections, declaring "Chicago will yet redeem herself, she will do so at the next election, and after that she will be right at every election."

== Election ==
Both the Republican Party and Democratic Party held nominating conventions on February 28. Republicans nominated congressman John Wentworth for mayor (who had previously served several terms as a Democratic congressman). Former congressman (and future president) Abraham Lincoln delivered an impassioned speech at the Republican convention on behalf of its ticket. Democrats nominated Benjamin Carver. Carver had previously been a member of the New York State Assembly (holding a Herkimer County seat in 1839). In Chicago, he was working as the cashier of the Marine Bank and the Chicago Marine and Fire Insurance Company, and was a relative political unknown when compared to political the heavyweight Wentworth. The results of the Democratic convention (including its nomination of Carver) were not made public until March 2, one day before the election.

Former congressman Abraham Lincoln (at the time a U.S. senate aspirant; who would go on to be elected U.S. president in 1860) came to Chicago and campaigned in support of Wentworth's candidacy. Wentworth had well-established support for abolitionist policies, while Carver was pro-slavery.

Wentworth's platform aroused some anti-Irish and anti-Catholic sentiments. One of the bastions of Democratic support in the city was its seventh ward (which encompassed the portions of the city that lay "east of the centre of the north branch of the Chicago River, and north of the centre of the Chicago River, and west of the centre of La Salle street and a line running due north of the last named street"), which was home to a predominantly Irish-American populace.

The day of the election was chaotic, with many instances of electoral violence arising across the city. Wentworth ultimately won by a wide margin and demonstrated a possible coattail effect, with his Republican ticket sweeping the city's other municipal elections as well.

== Results ==
1857 Chicago mayoral election
Party	Candidate	Votes	%
Republican	John Wentworth	5,933	55.06
Democratic	Benjamin F. Carver	4,842	44.94
Turnout		10,775	
