= Remington Stables =

- U.S. National Register of Historic Places
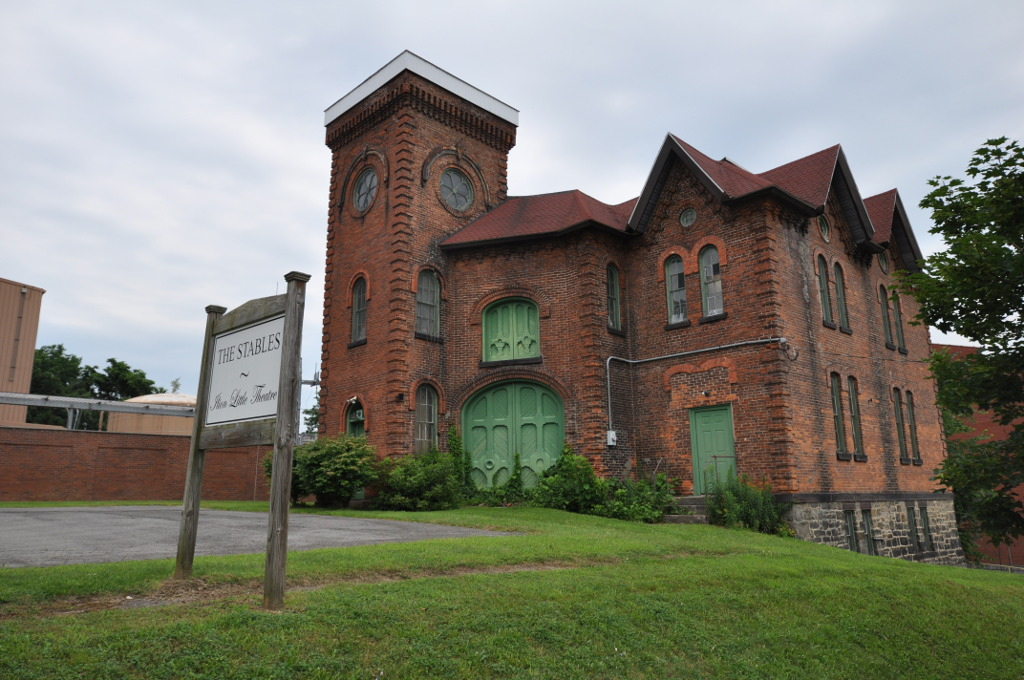

- Location within New York Location within the United States
- Location: 1 Remington Ave., Ilion, New York
- Coordinates: 43°0′44″N 75°2′7″W
- Area: less than one acre
- Built: 1870
- NRHP reference No.: 76001222
- Added to NRHP: October 29, 1976

Remington Stables is a historic stable building located at Ilion in Herkimer County, New York. It is a large 2-story brick structure built about 1870 as part of the Remington Mansion complex. The mansion was demolished about 1930. It consists of three connecting masses: a 2-story, square central block; a 3-story, engaged tower; and a 1 1/2-story rear wing. When built, the tower had a pagoda roof, but it was removed in the 1930s. The stable building has been adapted for use as a theater and used by the Ilion Little Theatre Club.

It was listed on the National Register of Historic Places in 1976.
