= Philo Remington =

American businessman (1816–1889)

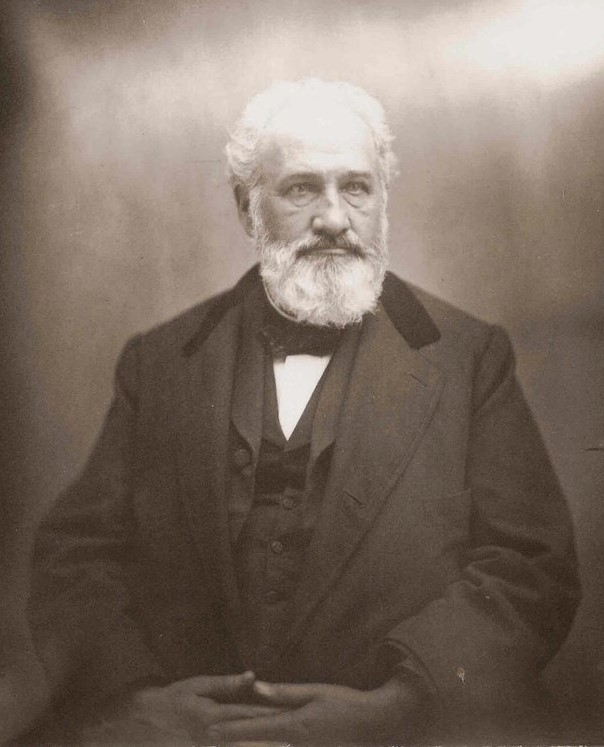
- Born: October 31, 1816; Litchfield, New York, U.S.
- Died: April 4, 1889 (aged 72); Silver Springs, Florida, U.S.
- Occupation: Businessman
- Spouse: Caroline A. Lathrop (m. 1841)
- Children: 2
- Father: Eliphalet Remington
- Relatives: Samuel Remington (brother); Eliphalet Remington III (brother)

Philo Remington (October 31, 1816 – April 4, 1889) was an American businessman. He was the eldest son of Eliphalet Remington, the founder of E. Remington and Sons (which later became Remington Arms).

== Early life ==
Philo Remington was born on October 31, 1816, in Litchfield, New York, U.S. He was the eldest of five children, born to Abigail (née Paddock) and Eliphalet Remington.

== Career ==
In 1839 he joined his father's business, the name of which was already "E. Remington & Son". In 1845, when his brother Samuel also joined the firm, its name was changed to "E. Remington & Sons". He was the manager of the mechanical department in his father's small-arms factory for over 25 years. He improved arms manufacture with the reflection method of straightening gun barrels and manufactured the first successful cast-steel, drilled rifle barrel made in the United States.

By 1847, his youngest brother, Eliphalet III, also joined the company. After their father's death in 1861, the three brothers took over assumed leadership of the company, with Philo becoming the company's new president. Samuel worked as the company's contract negotiator and purchasing agent, and Eliphalet III was in charge of the company's office and its correspondence. The company and supplied small arms to the Union during the American Civil War.

After the Civil War, the company's arms sales initially declined severely, Faced with impending fiscal ruin in the initial years after the war, the original partnership was folded, with a new joint-stock company bearing its same name being founded incorporated in 1865. Remington was again made president of the reincorporated company. To compensate for decreased firearms sales after the Civil War, the company branched into the manufacture of additional products, including agricultural tools, typewriters, and sewing machines. Remington was active when the firm won the contract to manufacture what was then known as the Sholes and Glidden typewriter on March 1, 1873. In the 1870s, the company developed a reputation for fostering invention beyond just firearms, and employed many inventors. During the 1870s and 1880s, there were periods where the company averaged four new patents per week. Remington personally fostered invention in the company, hearing pitches from inventors at his personal residence where he would decide whether the company would greenlight their ideas. The company's armory operation would help in setting-up the patenting and production of greenlit products.

In addition to his work in business, Remington was also the president of the village of Ilion, New York, for 20 years. Remington retired from business in 1886. Remington's brother Samuel died in December 1882, leaving Philo and Eliphalet III the two surviving brothers. A failure by E. Remington & Sons. company to meet their obligations to creditors in 1886 saw Philo and Eliphalet III go from ranking among the wealthiest men in American to being of meager wealth.

== Personal life ==
Remington married Caroline A. Lathrop of Syracuse on December 28, 1841. They had two daughters, Ida R. and Ella. His daughter Ida married Watson C. Squire. He was an advocate for temperance.

Remington and his brother Eliphalet III donated land that was used for the construction of the campus of Syracuse University. Combined, he and his two brothers gave $250,000 to the university in its early organization.

Remington died of bilious fever on April 4, 1889, while in Silver Springs, Florida.

== See also ==
- E. Remington and Sons
- Remington Arms
