= Hartwell Carver =

American physician

- 54-foot monument to Carver in Mount Hope Cemetery. Paid for by Union Pacific Railroad.
- Born: July 19, 1789
- Died: April 16, 1875 (aged 85)
- Resting place: Mount Hope Cemetery, Rochester, New York
- Occupations: Doctor, businessman
- Known for: Advocate for Pacific Railroad

Dr. Hartwell Carver (July 19 1789 – April 16, 1875) was an American medical doctor, businessman, and an early promoter of what would become the Transcontinental Railroad.

Carver's push for a railroad to connect both coasts of the United States began in 1832 with a proposal that was dismissed by Congress. Over the next several years, Carver wrote a series of articles in the New York Courier and Enquirer about the subject. He participated in the hammering of the Golden Spike that officially joined the Central Pacific and Union Pacific railroads on May 10, 1869 at Promontory, Utah.

His historic home in Pittsford sold in 2018 for $1,179,000.

Carver was interred at Mount Hope Cemetery in Rochester, New York under a 50-foot (15.24 m) monument erected by the Union Pacific Railroad. The monument is the second tallest in the cemetery. The inscription reads:

"Dr. Carver was the father of the Pacific Railroad; with him originated the thought of connecting the Atlantic and Pacific Oceans by railroad."

Carver was erroneously described on the monument at his grave, as well as by local histories, as the great-grandson of John Carver, who came over on the Mayflower and was the first governor of Plymouth Colony, while this purported ancestor actually had no descendants.
