= M1841 Mississippi rifle =

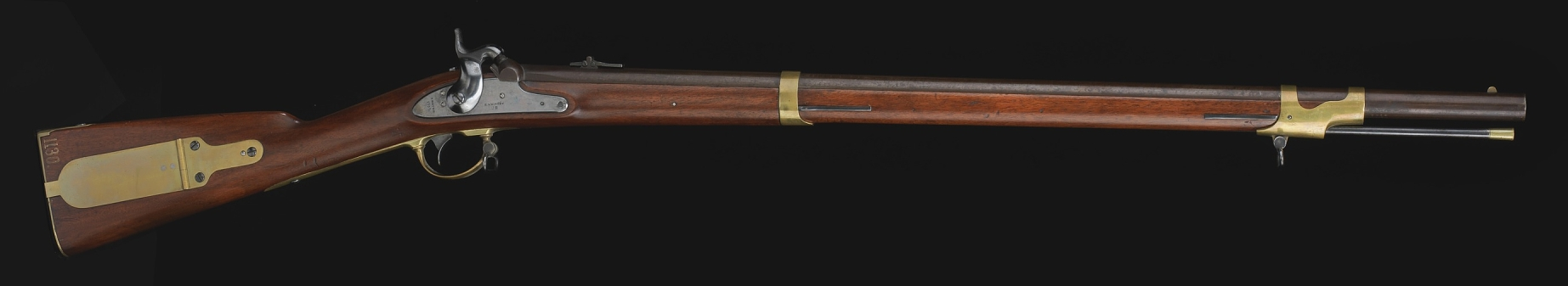
- Type: Muzzle-loading rifle
- Place of origin: United States

Service history
- Used by: United States; Confederate States of America; Mexico
- Wars: Seminole Wars; Mexican–American War; Lopez Expedition; American Civil War

Production history
- Designed: 1840
- Manufacturer: Harper's Ferry Armory, E. Whitney
- Unit cost: 16 dollars
- Produced: 1841–1861

Specifications
- Mass: 9 lb 4 oz (4.2 kg)
- Length: 48.5 in (1,230 mm)
- Barrel length: 33 in (840 mm)
- Cartridge: .54 ball, .58 Minie ball
- Cartridge weight: 0.5 oz (14 g)
- Caliber: 0.54, 0.58
- Action: Percussion lock
- Rate of fire: 2-3 per minute
- Muzzle velocity: 1,000 to 1,200 feet per second
- Effective firing range: 1,100 yd (1,000 m)
- Maximum firing range: 2,000 yd (1,800 m)
- Feed system: Muzzle-loaded
- Sights: Blade (front), V-notch, leaf, ladder sight (rear)

The M1841 Mississippi rifle is a muzzle-loading percussion rifle used in the Mexican–American War and the American Civil War.

== Development ==
When Eli Whitney III took over management of the Whitney Armory in 1842, he set about tooling up under his new contract from the U.S. government for making the model 1841 percussion rifle. Machinery and fixtures for making the 1822 contract flintlock musket had to be retooled or replaced in order to produce the lock and barrel of the new model. Whitney hired armourer Thomas Warner as foreman, who, as master armourer at Springfield Armory, had been implementing similar changes there.

Warner spearheaded the drive to equip the Springfield Armory with a set of new, more precise machines, and a system of gauging that made it possible to achieve interchangeability of parts in military small arms. Under Warner's tutelage, Whitney equipped the Whitney Armory to do likewise.

== Design and features ==
The Mississippi rifle was the first standard U.S. military rifle to use a percussion lock system. Percussion lock systems were much more reliable and weatherproof than the flintlock systems that they replaced, and were such an improvement that many earlier flintlock rifles and muskets were later converted to percussion lock systems.

The Mississippi rifle was originally produced in .54 caliber, using 1:66 rifling and no provision for fixing a bayonet.

In 1855, the Mississippi rifle was changed to .58 caliber, so that it could use the .58 caliber Minie Ball that had recently become standard. Many older Mississippi rifles were re-bored to .58 caliber. The rifle was also modified to accept a sword type bayonet.

The first Mississippi rifles had a v-notch sight. This was later replaced with leaf sights with 100, 300, and 500 yard ranges. A ladder sight with ranges from 100 to 1100 yards in 100 yard increments was fitted on some later rifles.

== Nickname ==
The nickname "Mississippi" originated in the Mexican–American War when Jefferson Davis was appointed Colonel of the Mississippi Rifles, a volunteer regiment from Mississippi. Colonel Davis sought to arm his regiment with Model 1841 rifles. At this time, smoothbore muskets were still the primary infantry weapon, and any unit with rifles was considered special and designated as such.

The Model 1841 percussion rifle was also known as the “Windsor rifle,” “Harpers Ferry rifle,” “Whitney rifle,” “Remington rifle” and “Yaeger rifle.”

Davis clashed with his commanding officer, General Winfield Scott, who said that the weapons were insufficiently tested and refused Davis' request. Davis took his case to President James K. Polk who overruled Scott. The incident started a lifelong feud between Davis and Scott.

The Mississippi rifle was sometimes referred to as a "yagger" rifle, due to its smaller size and its similarity to the German Jäger rifles. The old arsenal M1816/22 musket went to the Louisianans, Jennings' breech-loading .54-caliber rifles to the Mississippians, and M1841s (the "Jaeger" rifles) were issued to the Kentuckian Regiment, which used them during the invasion of Spanish Cuba in 1851.

Overasll, roughly 70,000 Model 1841s were produced by the Harpers Ferry National Armory and contractors between 1846 and 1855. In 1861, both the United States and the Confederacy put many of these Model 1841 rifles back into service.

== Legacy ==
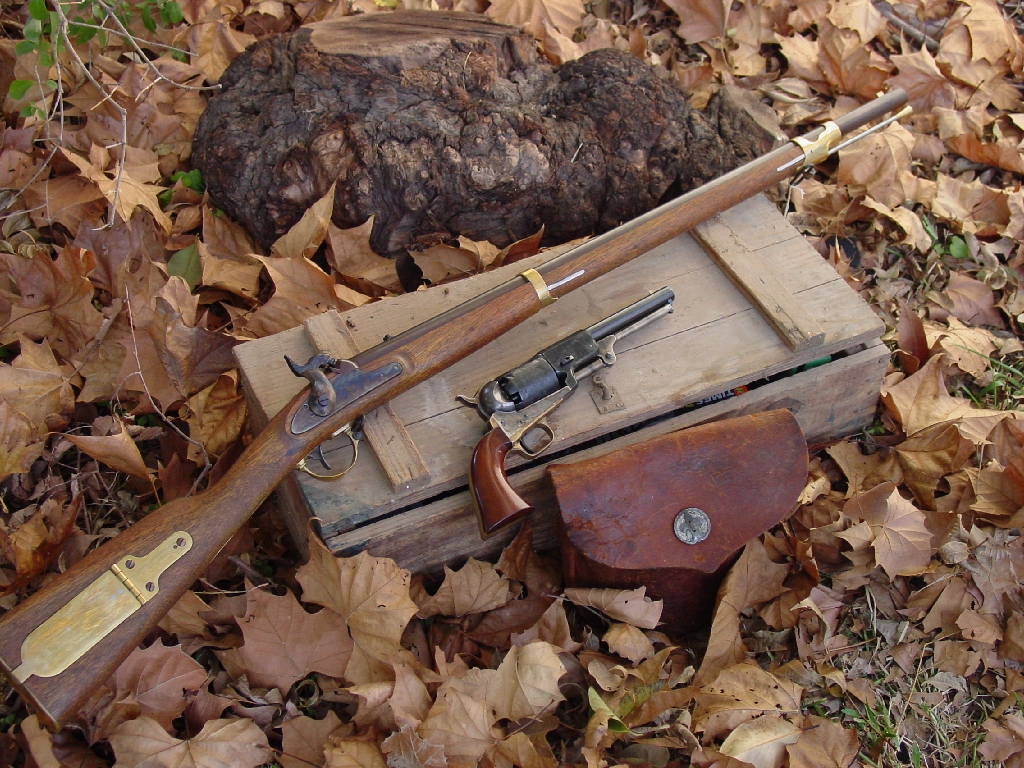
Replicas of 1841 Mississippi Rifle and 1849 Colt Third Variation .44 Pistol

The Model 1841 was replaced by the minie ball firing Springfield Model 1855, which became the standard issue weapon for regular army infantry, and ultimately the Springfield Model 1861 and Model 1863.

It was replaced by next successor, the Zouave rifle. Merrill & Thomas Baltimore converted a small batch of M1841 percussion muzzle-loading arms to breech-loading mechanism during the early Civil War.

Large-scale retooling of existing rifles were done to increase the bore to .58 inch to match the standfard round used by the Model 1855. Parts, locks, and stocks left in supply were matched with newly forged 40-inch barrels, and barrels were used to make new rifles of this pattern in .58 caliber. As well as this work being done at Harper's Ferry and Springfield it was done by contractors like Eli Whitney, Remington, and Robbins, Kendall, and Lawrence Armory (RK&L) of Windsor, Vermont (Note: The company's first order was for 10,000 model 1841 rifles for $11.90 each on February 18, 1845. Contracted to produce 2,000 annually, RK&L finished the contract by mid-1848, 18 months early. By January 5, 1848, Kendall had left and the company was operating as Robbins and Lawrence (R&L) when they revceived a contract to make a further 15,000 at 3,000 per annum, completing in 1853. After the introduction of the Model 1855 Springfield, R&L also received the contract to upgrade M1841s to the War Department's order to align them with the new Springfield in an 1855-1856 upgrade. They had also been able to sell gun making machinery (150 in all), to upgrade the new Enfield Armory in England. The British also awarded a later contract during the Crimean War for 25,000 Enfield P1853 and P1856 rifles. The contract's stiff penalty clause for missing the production schedule caused R&L to go bankrupt in 1859. Lamon, Goodnow and Yale (LG&Y) bought the factory to make sewing machines, but the onset of the war led them to continue producing the P1853, P1856, and licensed Sharps 1859s for the duration of the war.)

By the time of the Civil War, the Mississippi Rifle was generally considered old-fashioned but effective. It was carried by some Union troops up until 1863, though the 45th New York Infantry still used the rifle beyond Gettysburg. Some Confederate cavalry and sharpshooter units continued to use the rifle until the end of the war, evidenced by surviving Confederate ordnance requisitions. Augusta Machine Works produced a small run of rifles patterned on the U.S. Model 1841 “Mississippi Rifle” early in the Civil War, filling a Confederate need for standardized arms before larger armories came online. This rifle was part of the equipment issued to the Tiger Rifles, a volunteer company raised in New Orleans, which later became part of the Louisiana Infantry Regiment. The Louisiana Tigers were known for their fierce fighting spirit and were often described as fearless shock troops in the C.S. Army.

During Second Franco-Mexican War, Mexican loyalist forces utilized a limited quantity of M1841 Mississippi rifles, in addition to 1853 Enfield Rifle Muskets, as their primary infantry weaponry. It is not known whether Imperial Mexican forces were issued these same arms.

The rifle also saw a long use on the western frontier in civilian hands as well as those of first nations. Both parties found it a reliable, accurate hunting and home defense weapon.

== See also ==
- 155th Infantry Regiment "Mississippi Rifles"
- Rifles in the American Civil War
