= Eliphalet Remington III =

American businessman

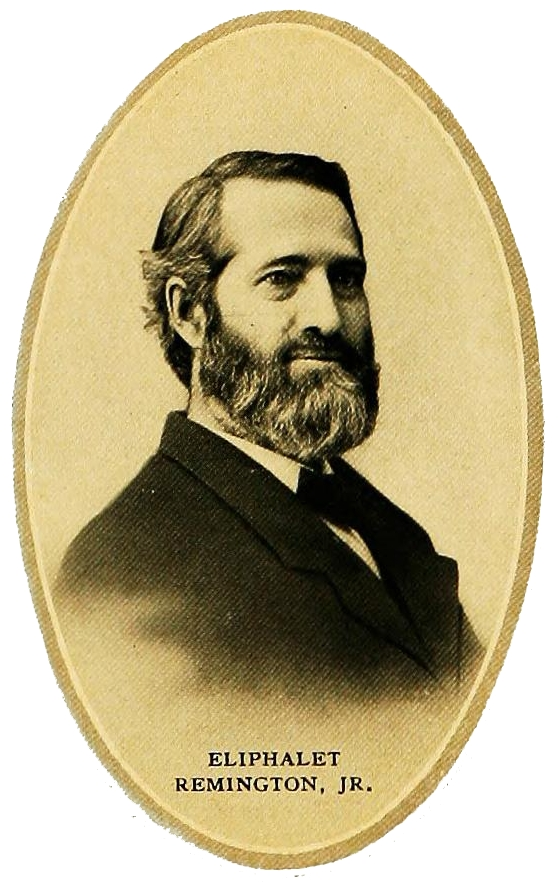
- Portrait of Eliphalet Remington III from 1912
- Born: November 12, 1828; Ilion, New York, United States
- Died: April 2, 1924 (aged 95)
- Occupation: Businessman
- Known for: Executive of his family business E. Remington and Sons
- Parent(s): Eliphalet Remington II and Abigail Remington
- Family: Philo Remington (brother), Samuel Remington (brother)

Eliphalet Remington III (November 12, 1828–April 2, 1924) was an American businessman who worked as an executive of firearms manufacturer E. Remington and Sons, a company founded by his father Eliphalet Remington II. Remington was involved in the founding of Syracuse University, and served as a trustee of the university.

== Early life ==
Eliphalet Remington III was born near Ilion, New York, on November 12, 1828. He was the youngest of the three sons born to Eliphalet Remington II and Abigail Remington.

== Career ==
By 1847, he and his elder brothers Philo and Samuel, became partners in their father's gun manufacturing company, which was renamed E. Remington and Sons.

After their father's death in 1861, the three assumed leadership of the company, with Philo becoming the company's new president Samuel working as its contract negotiator and purchasing agent, and Eliphalet III being in charge of the company's office and its correspondence. In writing correspondence, Remington III was known for his handsome handwriting.

== Personal life and death ==
Remington's brother Samuel died in December 1882.

Remington, a devout Methodist, established the New York Daily Sun as a publication to spread religious and pro-temperance writings. Remington was involved in establishing Syracuse University. He and his brother Philo donated land that was used for the construction of the campus of university. He donated substantial sums of money to the newly established university. Combined, he and his two elder brothers gave $250,000 to the university in its early organization.

A failure by E. Remington & Sons. company to meet their obligations to creditors in 1886 saw Philo and Eliphalet III go from ranking among the wealthiest men in American to being of meager wealth. In his later years, Remington was described as living life as essentially a pauper, being financially dependent on aid received from Syracuse University, which he served as a trustee of. At the time of his death, he was the university's oldest trustee.

Remington died on April 2, 1924.
