= Samuel Remington =

American businessman and inventor

- portrait photograph of Remington

Personal details
- Born: April 12, 1819 Herkimer County, New York, U.S.
- Died: December 1, 1882 (age 63) Ilion, New York, U.S.
- Spouse: Flora Carver
- Parents: Eliphalet Remington II (father); Abigail Paddock (mother)
- Relatives: Philo Remington (brother); Eliphalet Remington III (brother); Benjamin Carver (father-in-law)
- Profession: businessman, inventor
- Known for: E. Remington and Sons (predecessor of Remington Arms and RemArms)

Samuel Remington (April 12, 1819–December 1, 1882) was an American businessman and inventor. Remington worked at E. Remington and Sons, a firearm manufacturing company founded by his father Eliphalet II. Remington and his brothers, Philo and Eliphalet III joined their father as partners, and took over the business after their father's 1861 death. In the years subsequent, the company greatly expanded during the American Civil War. After the war, Remington secured the company major contracts from foreign governments. His success in marketing and sales sales were of key importance to the company's survival during the two decades subsequent to the Civil War.

== Early life ==
Samuel Remington was born April 12, 1819 in Herkimer County, New York, in what was later incorporated as Ilion. He was the second-born son of Eliphalet Remington II and Abigail Paddock. Remington and his siblings grew up on a farm his father owned in what later became Ilion.

== Career in manufacture and invention ==
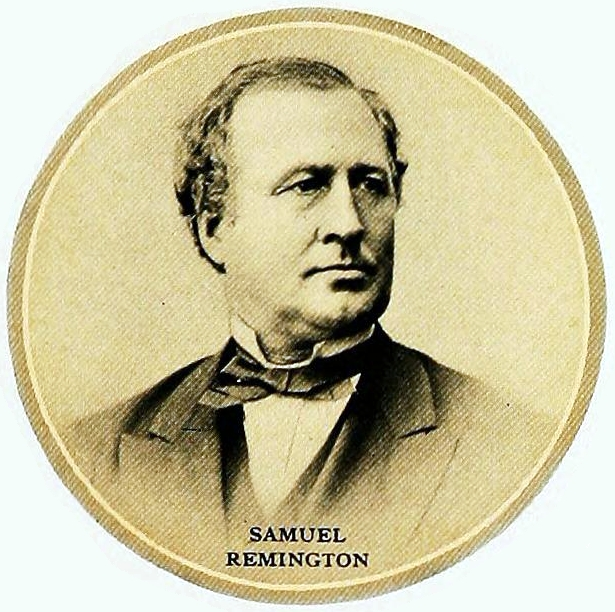
portrait photograph of Remington

=== Business operations ===
In 1850, Remington operated a store in Herkimer County. He soon, however, joined his brother Philo and father in the manufacture of firearms. His father's company was re-named E. Remington and Sons. A third brother Eliphalet III, joined as well before their father's death. After their father's death on July 2, 1861, the brother's took over the operation. Remington would hold the role of financial manager, and for many years also served as the company's European agent. Remington had a reputation for having strong business instincts.

Beginning in 1861, during the American Civil War, the company expanded its operations significantly. Remington Model 1858, a revolver design, became widely adopted by cavalry during the war. The company's plant in Ilion, New York, grew into the largest private armory in the United States.

Remington's skill at marketing and sales, in tandem with an 1865 patent on a Joseph Rider-designed breechloading mechanism, allowed the company's firearms sales to stay afloat through the 1888.

When he was working as the company's European agent, Remington spent a significant amount of his time in Europe and established residence in London and Paris. He secured the company large and lucrative weapons manufacture contracts with the governments of several foreign nations, including Egypt and Spain, which allowed it to expand its business abroad. Amid the Franco-Prussian War, Remington was able to secure more than $11 million (approximately $280 million, when adjusted for inflation) worth of contracts from the French government. For some time, Samuel was given the title of "president" of the company in order to give him carry more prestige and when meeting with potential buyers.

After ending his work in Europe, Remington re-settled in his native New York, and oversaw the business's operations.

=== Patents ===
Remington was regarded to have been a skilled mechanic. He was awarded a number of patents In 1855, he and Asa Landphere were granted a patent for a spoke machine (US Patent #12459). In 1859, Remington was assigned half the patent on John F. Thomas's design for a percussion cane gun (which Thomas had been granted the patent for the previous year). In 1863, Remington was granted a patent on an improved design for securing base pins of revolvers (US Patent #37921), and another patent for a drop hammer design.

== Personal life, family, death ==
Remington was married to Flora Carver, the daughter of Benjamin Carver. Together they had four children:

- Carver Remington (1849–1910), married Harriet Hoefler
- Eliphalet Remington IV (died 1938), married Jane Ledyard
- Franklin Remington (1865–1955), married Maude Willett
- Jennie Remington

During his years working in Europe, Remington personally appreciated the opportunity to explore Europe in his work, and picked up some foreign-language fluency. Remington had a personal interest in agriculture, and in his later years owned a residence near Cazenovia, New York, where he established a demonstration farm. Remington and his brothers engaged in philanthropy, and were major benefactors of Syracuse University. Combined, the three brothers gave the university $250,000 in its early years.

Remington died at his Ilion residence on December 1, 1882 of pleuropneumonia at the age of 63. He was survived by his wife and three sons. After his death, his share of the company was purchased by his elder brother, Philo. Remington's widow, Flora, died on June 3, 1888.

On July 27, 1910, Remington's son, Carver, committed suicide at the age of 60 by shooting himself in the chest with a Remington-manufactured revolver. Carver's disappointment in the lack of success of business ventures he was involved in were cited as the proximate motivation for the suicide.
