= Ilion, New York =

- Village
- Location within New York Location within the United States
- Coordinates: 43°1′N 75°3′W
- Country: United States
- State: New York
- County: Herkimer
- Towns: German Flatts, Frankfort

Government
  - Mayor: John Stephens

Area
  - Total: 2.55 sq mi (6.61 km^{2})
  - Land: 2.49 sq mi (6.46 km^{2})
  - Water: 0.058 sq mi (0.15 km^{2})
- Elevation: 407 ft (124 m)

Population (2020)
  - Total: 7,646
  - Density: 3,067.1/sq mi (1,184.21/km^{2})
- Time zone: UTC-5 (Eastern (EST))
  - Summer (DST): UTC-4 (EDT)
- ZIP code: 13357
- Area code: 315
- FIPS code: 36-37275
- GNIS feature ID: 0953587
- Website: ilionny.com

Ilion is a village in Herkimer County, New York, United States. Located in the Mohawk Valley region, the population was 7,646 at the 2020 census.

The village is at the northern edge of the town of German Flatts, though a tiny portion is in the town of Frankfort. It is south of the Mohawk River and Erie Canal.

== History ==
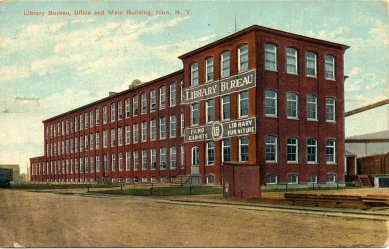
Library Bureau, Ilion, NY, Office and Factory 1911

Ilion is a name for the ancient city of Troy. The area where Ilion is located was first settled by Palatine Germans under the Burnetsfield Patent around 1725. Settlers first took plots along Steele Creek, which flows into the Mohawk River. Gradually they built many mills along the creek. After the American Revolution, a small community was set up in the area named "New London". This area of the village still has buildings which use the name "London".

The community began to flourish starting around 1816 when Eliphalet Remington created his first rifle. He developed the Remington Arms manufacturing company. The community was stimulated in growth by the completion in 1825 of the Erie Canal, which completed area trade and connection with products from the Great Lakes region.

In 1843 a post office was desired, so the people had to choose a name. Remington refused to be the namesake of the village, and it was eventually named Ilion.

The village of Ilion was incorporated in 1852. Ilion is one of only twelve villages in New York still incorporated under a charter, the others having incorporated or re-incorporated under the provisions of Village Law.

In December 2023 RemArms LLC announced that the Remington Arms factory located in the village will be permanently closed in March 2024, eliminating 300 jobs. The property was sold to a developer in December 2024. On March 4, 2025, the Remington Arms factory ceased operations for good.

== Geography ==
Ilion is located in the northwest corner of the town of German Flatts. According to the United States Census Bureau, the village has a total area of 2.5 square miles (6.6 km^{2}), of which 2.5 square miles (6.5 km^{2}) are land and 0.06 square miles (0.15 km^{2}), or 2.31%, are water. The village is on the south bank of the Mohawk River and is bordered to the east by the village of Mohawk.

Bird's eye view of Ilion, N.Y.

== Demographics ==
Historical population
Census	Pop.	Note	%±
1870	2,876		—
1880	3,711		29.0%
1890	4,057		9.3%
1900	5,138		26.6%
1910	6,588		28.2%
1920	10,169		54.4%
1930	9,890		−2.7%
1940	8,927		−9.7%
1950	9,363		4.9%
1960	10,199		8.9%
1970	9,808		−3.8%
1980	9,450		−3.7%
1990	8,888		−5.9%
2000	8,610		−3.1%
2010	8,053		−6.5%
2020	7,646		−5.1%
U.S. Decennial Census

=== 2020 census ===
As of the 2020 census, Ilion had a population of 7,646. The median age was 40.2 years. 23.1% of residents were under the age of 18 and 19.4% of residents were 65 years of age or older. For every 100 females there were 94.8 males, and for every 100 females age 18 and over there were 93.4 males age 18 and over.

98.8% of residents lived in urban areas, while 1.2% lived in rural areas.

There were 3,258 households in Ilion, of which 28.1% had children under the age of 18 living in them. Of all households, 37.3% were married-couple households, 21.7% were households with a male householder and no spouse or partner present, and 30.8% were households with a female householder and no spouse or partner present. About 34.3% of all households were made up of individuals and 15.1% had someone living alone who was 65 years of age or older.

There were 3,562 housing units, of which 8.5% were vacant. The homeowner vacancy rate was 3.1% and the rental vacancy rate was 5.8%.

Racial composition as of the 2020 census
Race	Number	Percent
White	6,864	89.8%
Black or African American	164	2.1%
American Indian and Alaska Native	3	0.0%
Asian	41	0.5%
Native Hawaiian and Other Pacific Islander	1	0.0%
Some other race	56	0.7%
Two or more races	517	6.8%
Hispanic or Latino (of any race)	244	3.2%

=== 2000 census ===
As of the 2000 census, there were 8,610 people, 3,425 households, and 2,212 families residing in the village. The population density was 3,476.6 inhabitants per square mile (1,342.3/km^{2}). There were 3,623 housing units at an average density of 1,462.9 per square mile (564.8/km^{2}). The racial makeup of the village was 97.35% White, 0.66% African American, 0.12% Native American, 0.21% Asian, 0.01% Pacific Islander, 0.24% from other races, and 1.41% from two or more races. Hispanic or Latino of any race were 1.58% of the population.

There were 3,425 households, out of which 33.3% had children under the age of 18 living with them, 46.0% were married couples living together, 14.2% had a female householder with no husband present, and 35.4% were non-families. 30.4% of all households were made up of individuals, and 15.4% had someone living alone who was 65 years of age or older. The average household size was 2.47 and the average family size was 3.06.

In the village, the population was spread out, with 26.6% under the age of 18, 8.6% from 18 to 24, 27.0% from 25 to 44, 21.5% from 45 to 64, and 16.3% who were 65 years of age or older. The median age was 37 years. For every 100 females, there were 85.5 males. For every 100 females age 18 and over, there were 82.3 males.

The median income for a household in the village was $31,793, and the median income for a family was $38,203. Males had a median income of $30,069 versus $21,754 for females. The per capita income for the village was $14,264. About 14.1% of families and 17.1% of the population were below the poverty line, including 23.3% of those under age 18 and 13.9% of those age 65 or over.

== Landmarks ==
The 1 million square-foot factory previously owned by Remington Arms is a dominant structure in village. Included on the property were the Remington Museum, Remington Arms Custom Gun Shop, and corporate offices.

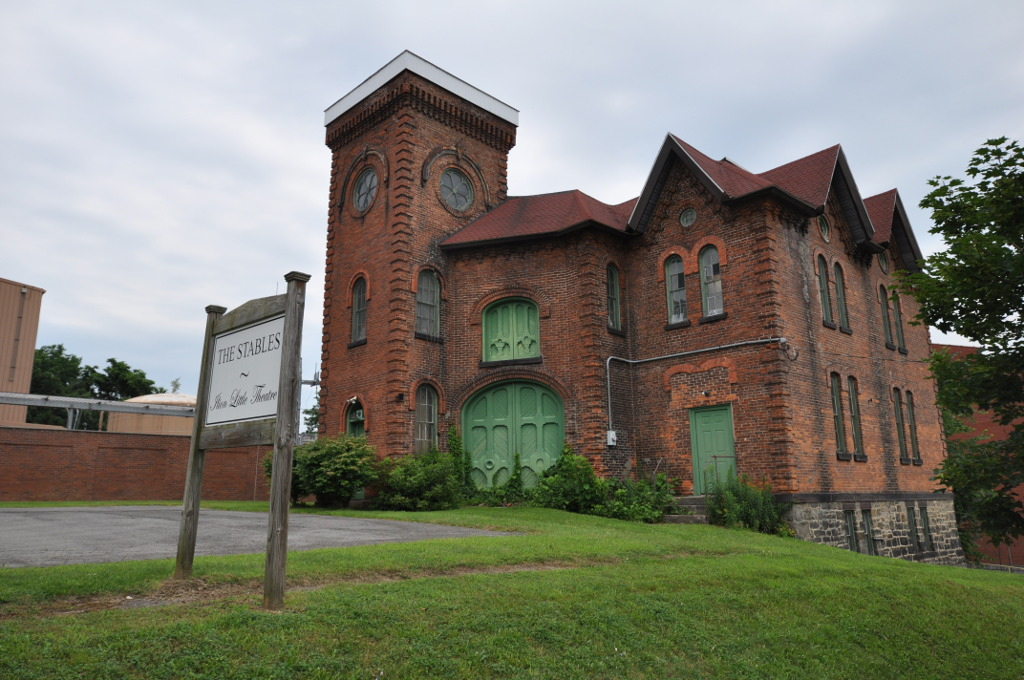
Remington Stables

The First United Methodist Church, Thomas Richardson House, Remington Stables, and United States Post Office are listed on the National Register of Historic Places.

== Education ==
Until its merger in 2013 with the Mohawk Central School District, Ilion Central School District was composed of three buildings: Remington Elementary, Barringer Road Elementary, and Ilion Jr/Sr High School. The athletic team's nickname was the Golden Bombers, the mascot was the Bomber Bear, and the school colors were gold and brown. Barringer Road Elementary, which remained open, nicknames its students the Bobcats. Remington Elementary was rented (and later sold) to Herkimer County BOCES and now houses its Pathways Academy, which provides education for students who struggle in a traditional school environment.

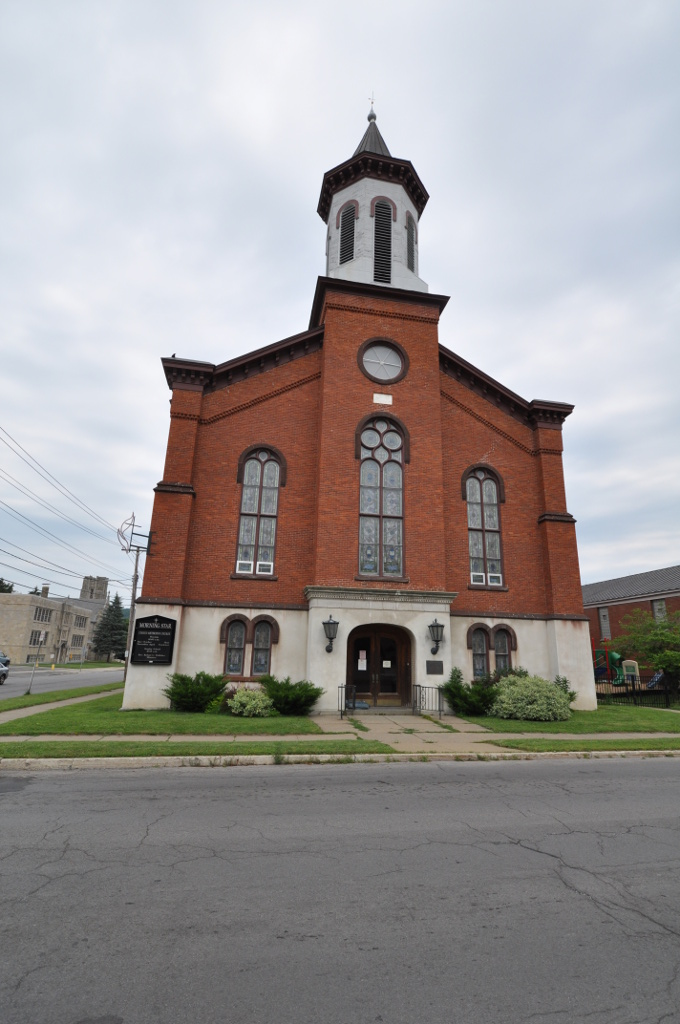
First Methodist Church

In the 2010–2011 year, the district had a $25 million budget and about 1,600 students; the 2011 budget proposed a cut of $1.1 million. Prior to their merger with Mohawk, Ilion Central School District was among the poorest in the state of New York. More than a third of its students were eligible for free or low-priced lunches, a standard measure of poverty. Ilion was promised additional state education aid after the CFE court ruling in 2006, but due to the state budget crisis, this did not come to fruition. Although the buildings remained in good repair, the district was not able to afford any foreign language education (other than Spanish), and offered only four of 34 possible AP courses.

A plan to merge the Mohawk and Ilion school districts had been proposed in 2009. In 2012, voters rejected a three-way merger including Herkimer Central School District, and a four-way merger that included Frankfort-Schuyler School District. In early 2013, voters approved the merger of the Mohawk and Ilion school districts. The new Central Valley Central School District began classes starting with the 2013–2014 academic year, with Ilion's high school serving as the new district's high school.

== Transportation ==
New York State Route 5S, an east–west highway, passes through the northern side of the village. New York State Route 51 (Central Avenue/Otsego Street), a north–south highway, passes through the village center and has its northern terminus north of the village at New York State Route 5.

== Notable people ==
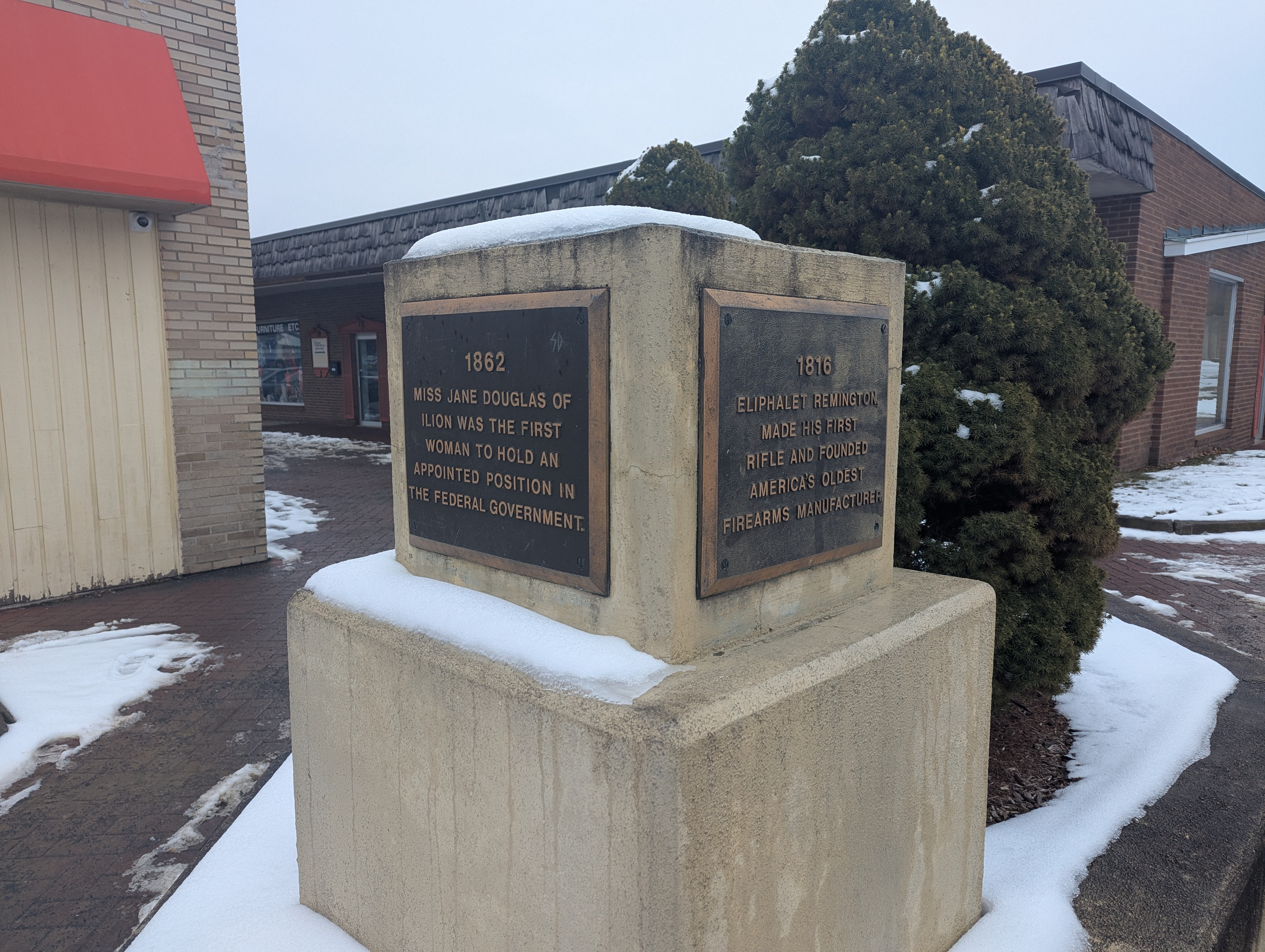
Monument to Jane Douglas and Eliphalet Remington in Ilion

- Brian Angelichio, Offensive Coordinator for the Pittsburgh Steelers
- Phoebe Brand, actress
- Boots Day, Major League Baseball player
- Jane Douglas, born in Peterboro and later moved to Ilion, was the first woman employed by the federal government.
- Christine McConnell, baker, artist, and YouTube celebrity
- Andrew D. Morgan, lawyer and former chairman of the New York State Hospital Commission
- Eliphalet Remington, founder of Remington Arms
- Philo Remington
- Samuel Remington
- Eliphalet Remington III
- May Gorslin Preston Slosson, educator and suffragette
- Peter H. Turner, Wisconsin politician
