= Eliphalet Remington =

American engineer (1793–1861)

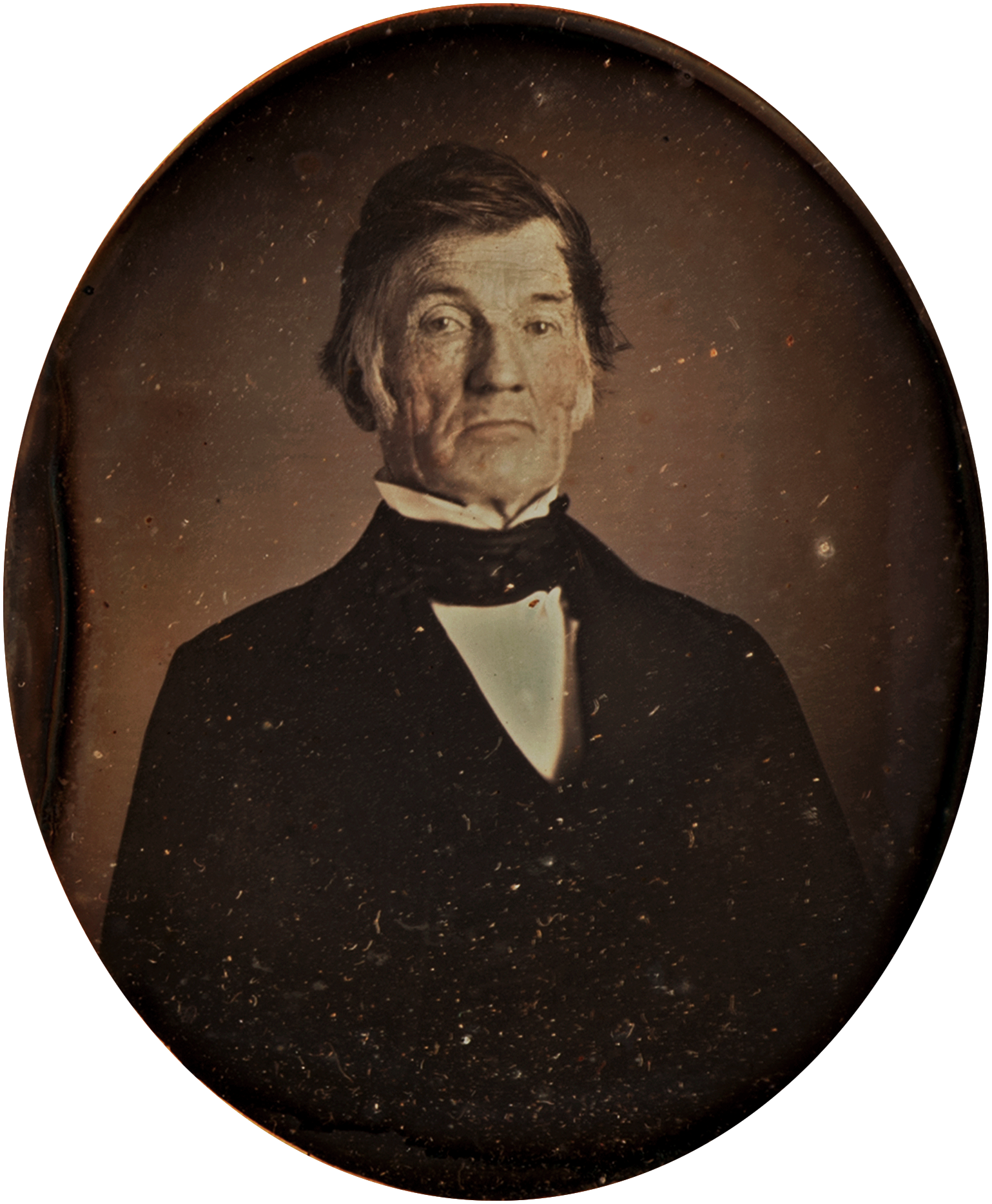
- Daguerreotype of Remington (c. 1845)
- Born: October 28, 1793; Suffield, Connecticut, U.S.
- Died: August 12, 1861 (aged 67); Ilion, New York, U.S.
- Spouse: Abigail Paddock
- Children: 5, including Philo, Samuel, and Eliphalet III
- Parent(s): Eliphalet Remington, Elizabeth Kilbourn
- Relatives: Frederic Remington (cousin)
- Engineering career
- Projects: Remington rifle

Eliphalet Remington II (October 28, 1793 – August 12, 1861) was an American engineer who founded what would become known as Remington Arms. Originally the company was known as E. Remington followed by E. Remington & Son and then E. Remington and Sons.

== Early years ==
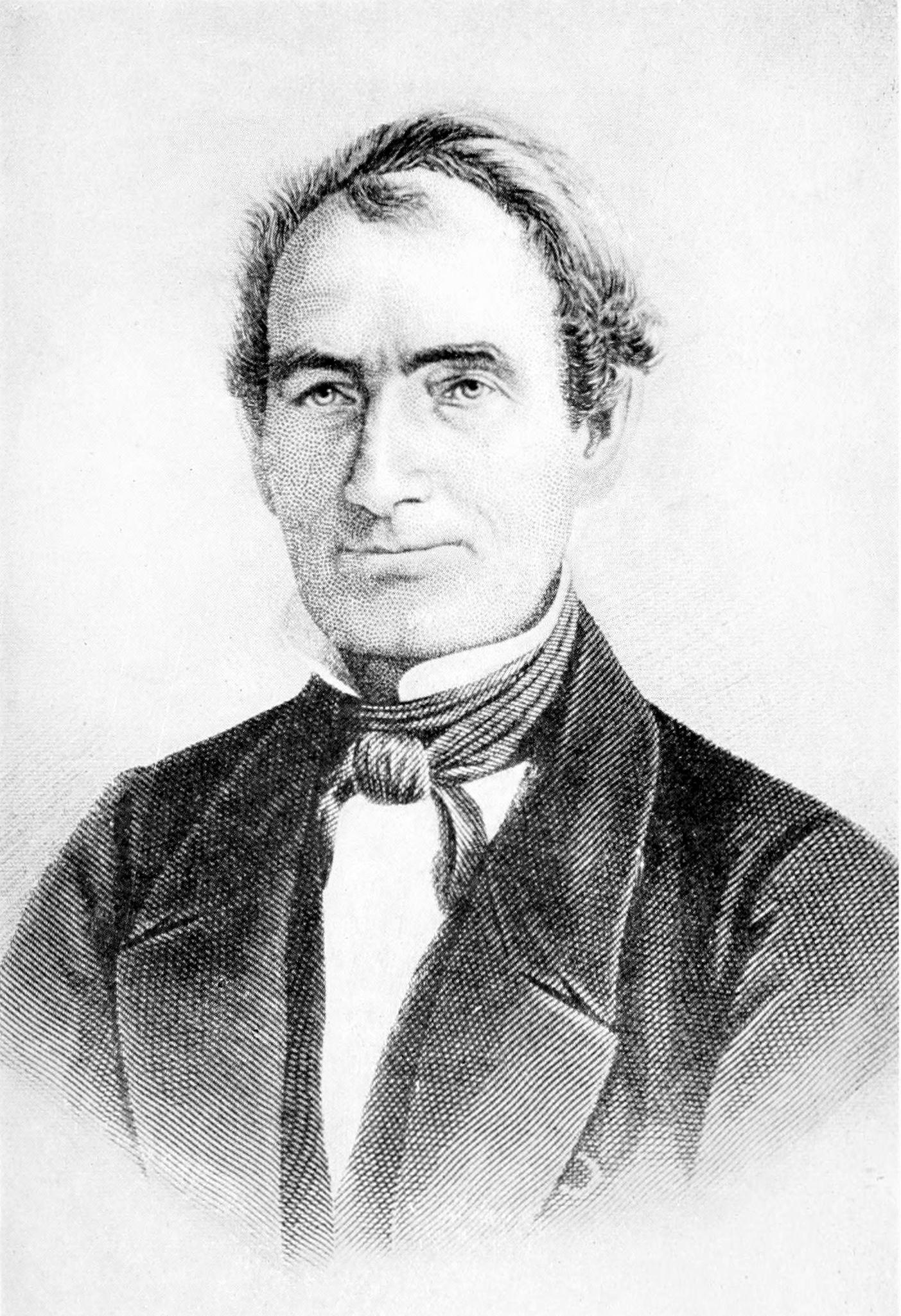
Sketch of Remington

Eliphalet Remington II was born in 1793 in the town of Suffield, Connecticut. He was the second child of four surviving children (but the only son) of Elizabeth (née Kilbourn) and Eliphalet Remington, whose family origins lay in Yorkshire, England. He was a cousin of the western artist Frederic Remington.

Eliphalet II followed in his father's footsteps and entered the blacksmith trade at the family's rural forge in Herkimer County, New York. The original family home at Kinne Corners, New York, built about 1810 and known as Remington House, was listed on the National Register of Historic Places in 1997.

== Remington Company co-founder ==
The younger Remington worked with his father in the forge, and at 23 he hand-made a flintlock rifle using a firing mechanism bought from a gunsmith, but constructing the barrel himself.

The rifle received such a response that Remington decided to manufacture it in quantity. By 1840, when his three sons began to take a more active role in the family business, he formed the firm of E. Remington and Sons, which he headed until his death in 1861.

The company continued to grow and to develop its product and gradually began the manufacture of other sporting goods, such as bicycles. The company operated as Remington Arms until its bankruptcy in 2020.

== Personal life ==
Remington married Abigail Paddock (1790–1841), and together they had five children: Philo, Eliphalet III, Samuel, Mary Ann and Naria.

In August 1861, Remington was diagnosed with "inflammation of the bowels". He would die shortly after on August 12, 1861.
