= Hesse-Hanau troops in the American Revolutionary War =

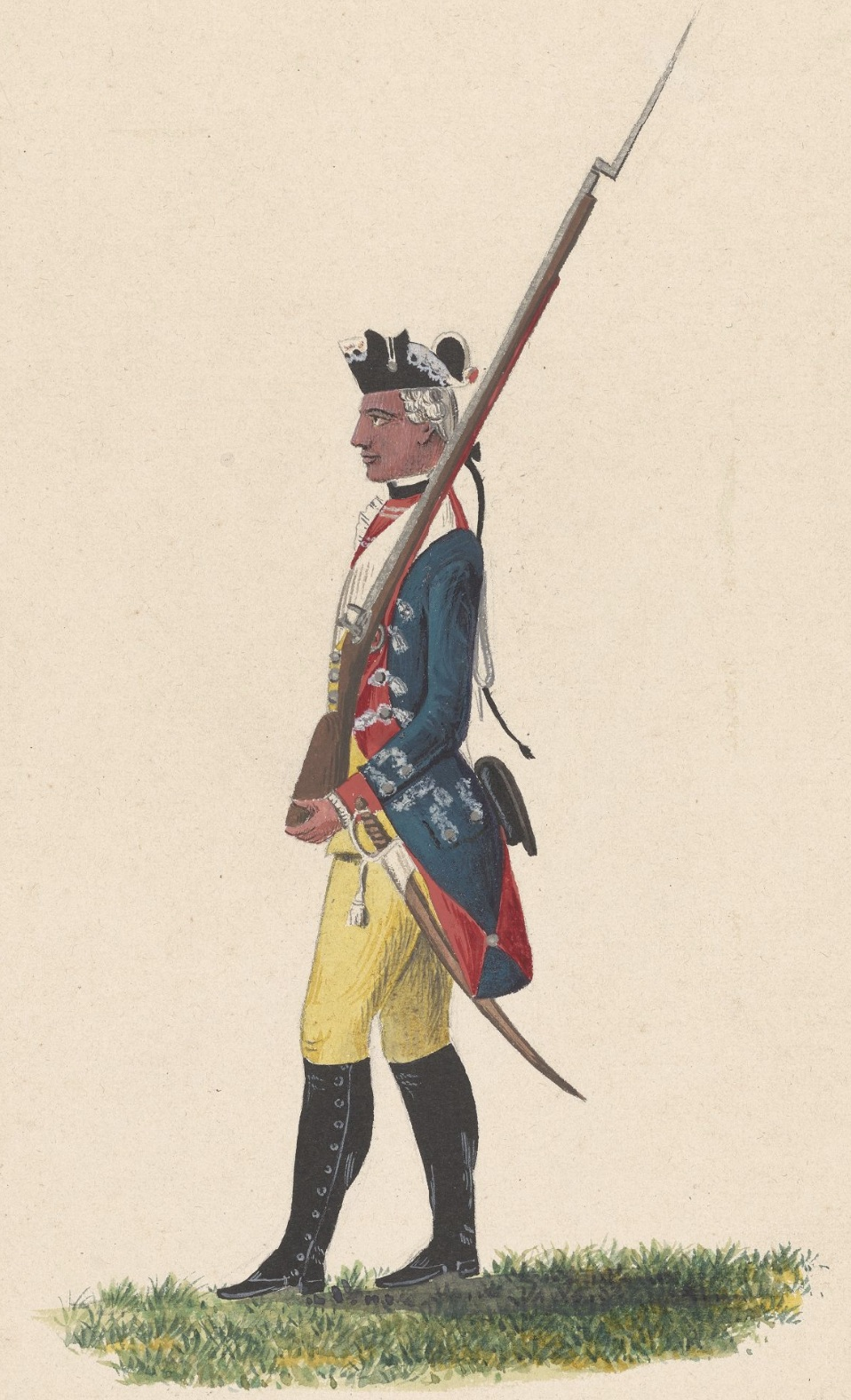
A private the Hesse-Hanau Regiment Erbprinz in 1778

Troops from Hesse-Hanau served as auxiliaries to the British Army during the American Revolutionary War, in accordance with the treaty of 1776 between Great Britain and the small principality. A regiment of foot, an artillery company, a ranger corps and a light infantry corps served in British America. A total of 2,422 soldiers were sent, with 1,441 returning, the remainder not surviving or choosing to remain in North America. As compensation, the reigning Count of Hesse-Hanau received a total of 343,110 pounds sterling from the British government.

== Background ==
At the outbreak of hostilities between Great Britain and its American colonies, Britain soon found that it needed to augment its troops with German auxiliaries, as had been done in previous wars, and was standard European practice. William, the hereditary prince of Hesse-Cassel, and the reigning count of Hesse-Hanau, offered the service of five hundred soldiers to his uncle, King George III of Great Britain. Subsequently a subsidy treaty was negotiated between Great Britain and Hesse-Hanau by Colonel William Faucitt and Baron Friedrich von der Malsburg.

== Treaty and additional conventions ==
The treaty between Hesse-Hanau and Great Britain was concluded February 5, 1776. It stipulated that Hanau would make a corps of infantry of 668 men available to Britain. The corps had to be properly officered, and the men ready for campaign service; the corps fully furnished with tents and equipment. In addition to the oath of fealty already sworn to the hereditary prince as reigning count of Hesse-Hanau, the officers and men should also swear an oath of allegiance to King George III. Hanau would maintain the number of men in the corps through annual recruitment if necessary. Britain would give the corps the same pay and allowances as enjoyed by British troops, and wounded soldiers would be treated in British military hospitals in the same way as British troops. As levy money Britain would pay 30 Banco-Thaler per man. For each man killed, or three man wounded, the same amount would be paid. For each year of service, Britain should pay 25,050 Banco-Thaler to the ruler of Hanau. An additional convention of April 25, 1776 stipulated the raising of a company of artillery of six artillery pieces, and 128 officers and men, for British service. A further convention of February 10, 1777 stipulated the raising of a corps of chasseurs (Jägers) for British service. The corps should only be recruited with professional hunters and good riflemen. In both cases, service would be under the same conditions as agreed on in 1776. The subsidy would be proportionally enlarged. In 1777 a fifth Jäger company was sent, and through yet an additional convention of January 15, 1781 a free corps of 830 light infantry embarked as the last Hanau troops for North America.

== Troops raised ==
=== Units ===
The Hesse-Hanau troops serving in British America contained the following units:

- Hessen-Hanauisches Regiment Erbprinz, 1776; Colonel Wilhelm Rudolf von Gall.
- Hessen-Hanauische Artillerie-Kompanie, 1776; Captain Georg Pausch.
- Hessen-Hanauisches Jägerkorps, 1777; Lieutenant-colonel Karl Adolf Christoph von Creutzburg.
- Hessen-Hanauisches Freikorps, 1781; Lieutenant-colonel Michael von Janecke.

=== Numbers ===
Hesse-Hanau in British America
1776	2,038
Recruits sent in April, 1781	50
Recruits sent in April 1782	334
Total	2,422
Returned 1783	1,441
Did not return	981

Total amount of subsidies paid for these troops were 3,802,000 Banco-Thaler, or 343,110 pound sterling.

== Campaigns ==
- Erbprinz = Siege of Ticonderoga, Battle of Bennington, Battle of Freeman's Farm, Battle of Bemis Heights.
- Artillery = Battle of Valcour Island, Battle of Bennington, Battle of Freeman's Farm, Battle of Bemis Heights.
- Jägerkorps = Siege of Ticonderoga, Siege of Fort Stanwix, Battle of Oriskany
- Erbprinz and the Artillery became for the most part prisoners of war in the Convention Army.
