= List of wars involving Canada =

This is a list of wars and armed conflicts in and involving Canada in chronological order, from the 11th century to the 21st century. It is divided into two main sections.

The first section outlines conflicts that happened in what is now Canada before its confederation in 1867. It lists conflicts such as: the Beaver Wars, Acadian Civil War, and various Anglo-Dutch Wars, highlighting the belligerents involved and the outcomes.

The second section discusses wars involving Canada since its confederation in 1867. It lists conflicts such as: the Fenian Raids, Red River Rebellion, Mahdist War, Canada in World War I and Canada in World War II, detailing the combatants, results, and casualties for each event. Ongoing conflicts and military operations, such as the military intervention against the Islamic State and involvement in maritime security operations in response to Houthi attacks are also covered.

== List ==
=== Colonial conflicts (17th century – 1867) ===
The following were conflicts that occurred in present-day Canada from the 17th century CE to the mid-19th century, prior to Canadian Confederation. Belligerents in these conflicts typically involved colonies in Canada (e.g. New France, the Canadas), and/or First Nations groups residing in the region.

Conflict	Combatant 1	Combatant 2	Result
American Indian Wars (1609–1890)	Colonists, Viceroyalty and Europeans: British Empire: Kingdom of England; Kingdom of Great Britain; British America; United Kingdom; British North America; Dominion of Canada First French Empire: Kingdom of France; New France Spanish Empire: Kingdom of Spain; Council of the Indies; Viceroyalty of New Spain Dutch Empire: New Netherland Russia; Russian America United States; Union Mexico Republic of Texas Confederate States Indigenous North Americans (Note: Various rival Native American tribes fought against each other, while making alliances with different White European colonial factions.)	Indigenous North Americans: American Indians, including the tribes: Cherokee, Creek (Muscogee), Lakota, Miami, Shawnee, Seminole, Wampanoag, Northwestern Confederacy and Tecumseh's Confederacy Comanche Alaska Natives	Sovereignty of various combatants extended or lost; Massive Indigenous population decline; Deportation and forced assimilation of Indigenous tribes; Many treaties, truces, and armistices made and broken by combatants; Indian reservations established in the United States
Beaver Wars (1609–1701)	Haudenosaunee League; Mohawks; Oneida; Seneca; Onondaga; Cayuga; Supported by: England; Dutch Republic	Wendat (Huron); Algonquin; Susquehannock; Erie; Neutral; Petun; Odawa; Ojibwe; Wenro; Mahican; Innu; Abenaki; Supported by: France	Indecisive: Great Peace of Montreal; Huron-Wendat Confederacy
Acadian Civil War (1635–1654)	St. John Administration; Supported by: Massachusetts Bay Colony	Port Royal Administration; Supported by: Catholic Church	Port Royal temporary victory: La Tour expelled by d'Aulnay; La Tour later marries d'Aulnay's widow Jeanne Motin & resumes Governorship
Second Anglo-Dutch War (1665–1667)	Dutch Republic; Denmark–Norway; France	England; Scotland; Münster	See Aftermath: Treaty of Breda; Dutch Republic cedes New Amsterdam to England; England cedes English Guiana, Fort Amsterdam, Ghana, and Run to the Dutch Republic
Third Anglo-Dutch War (1672–1674)	Dutch Republic	England; France	Treaty of Westminster
King William's War (1688–1697)	France: New France; Wabanakia; Algonquin; Kahnawake	England: New England; New York; Haudenosauneega Mohicans	Peace of Ryswick: Status quo ante bellum
Queen Anne's War (1702–1713)	France: New France; Spain loyal to Philip V: New Spain; Wabanaki Confederacy; Caughnawaga Mohawk; Choctaw; Timucua; Apalachee; Natchez	England (before 1707): English America; Great Britain (after 1707): British America; Muscogee (Creek); Chickasaw; Yamasee; Haudenosaunee Confederacy	British-Allied victory: Peace of Utrecht; Treaty of Portsmouth; France cedes to Britain the control of Acadia, Newfoundland, Hudson Bay, and Saint Kitts
Dummer's War (1722–1725)	New England; Mohawk	Wabanaki Confederacy; Abenaki; Pequawket; Mi'kmaq; Maliseet	Dummer's Treaty (preliminary 1725, final 1727)
King George's War (1744–1748)	France: New France; Wabanaki Confederacy	Great Britain: British America; Haudenosaunee Confederacy	Treaty of Aix-la-Chapelle: Status quo ante bellum
Father Le Loutre's War (1749–1755)	France: New France; Acadian militia; Wabanakik; Mi'kmaq militia; Wolastoqey militia	Great Britain: British America	British victory
Sixty Years' War (1754–1815)	1754–1763; Kingdom of France; New France 1763–1766; Warriors from numerous American Indian tribes 1775–1782; Great Britain (Kingdom of Great Britain) Loyalists 1785–1795; Northwestern Confederacy (Kingdom of Great Britain) Province of Quebec (until 1791) (Kingdom of Great Britain) Lower Canada (1791–1795) 1812–1815; United Kingdom; Upper Canada; Lower Canada; Tecumseh's Confederacy; Six Nations	1754–1763; Great Britain; British America Various Native tribes 1775–1782; United States; Spain 1785–1795; United States; Chickasaw; Choctaw 1812–1815; United States; Choctaw; Cherokee; Chickasaw; Seneca	Forced displacement and assimilation of Native nations
French and Indian War (1754–1763)	France; New France; Louisiana; Canada; Pro-French Native Americans	Great Britain; British America; New England Colonies; Province of New Hampshire; Province of Massachusetts Bay; Colony of Rhode Island and Providence Plantations; Connecticut Colony; Middle Colonies; Province of New York; Province of New Jersey; Province of Pennsylvania; Delaware Colony; Southern Colonies; Province of Maryland; Colony of Virginia; Province of North Carolina; Province of South Carolina; Province of Georgia; Pro-British Native Americans	British victory: France cedes New France east of the Mississippi River to Great Britain, retaining Saint Pierre and Miquelon, and transfers Louisiana to Spain.
Seven Years' War (1756–1763)	France; Holy Roman Empire (Note: While Prussia itself was part of the Empire and many HRE states remained neutral, the Imperial Diet formally declared action against Prussia, so it was an Imperial action rather than being conducted solely in the name of Austrian interests. See below.); Russia (Note: Until 1762); Spain (Note: From 1762); (Swedish Empire) Sweden; Bengal; and others...	Great Britain; Prussia; (Kingdom of Portugal) Portugal; Russia (Note: From Feb until June 1762); and others...	Anglo-Prussian coalition victory: France cedes its North American possessions east of the Mississippi River, along with the colonies of Canada, St Vincent, Tobago, Dominica, Grenada, and Northern Circars to Britain; France cedes Louisiana and its North American territory west of the Mississippi River to Spain; Spain cedes Florida to Britain, in exchange for the return of Havana and Manila
Pontiac's War (1763–1766)	(Kingdom of Great Britain) British Empire	Native American Coalition: Odawa Anishinaabek; Potawatomi Anishinaabek; Ojibwe Anishinaabek; Mingo people; Seneca people; Wyandot people; Miami people; Kickapoo people; Illinois people; Quapaw people Historically known as Arkansas	Military stalemate, with negotiated policy concessions in favor of the Native American side: Portage around Niagara Falls ceded by Senecas to the British
American Revolutionary War (1775–1783 (Note: A cease-fire in North America was proclaimed by Congress on April 11, 1783, under a cease-fire agreement between Great Britain and France on January 20, 1783. The final peace treaty was signed on September 3, 1783, and ratified on January 14, 1784, in the US, with final ratification exchanged in Europe on May 12, 1784. Hostilities in India continued until July 1783.))	Great Britain: (Kingdom of Great Britain) Loyalists; (Kingdom of Great Britain) Quebec; Nova Scotia; West Florida; East Florida; (Province of Hanover) Hanover; Combatants: Hesse (Note: Sixty-five percent of Britain's German auxiliaries employed in North America were from Hesse-Kassel (16,000) and Hesse-Hanau (2,422), flying this same flag.); (Duchy of Brunswick) Brunswick (Note: Twenty percent of Britain's German auxiliaries employed in North America were from Brunswick-Wolfenbüttel (5,723), flying this flag.); German mercenaries/auxiliaries (Note: The British hired over 30,000 professional soldiers from various German states who served in North America from 1775 to 1782. Commentators and historians often refer to them as mercenaries or auxiliaries, terms that are sometimes used interchangeably.); Hesse-Kassel; Hesse-Hanau; Waldeck; Brunswick; Ansbach; Anhalt-Zerbst; Hanover Native Americans; Onondaga; Mohawk; Cayuga; Seneca; Mi'kmaq (Note: (from 1779)); Cherokee; Odawa; Muscogee; Susquehannock; Shawnee	Patriots: Thirteen Colonies (1775); United Colonies (1775–1776): United States (from 1776) (Note: Including the United Colonies period from 1776 to 1781 and the Confederation period from 1781 to 1783.) (Note: The states involved in the Revolutionary War included New Hampshire, Massachusetts, Rhode Island, Connecticut, New York, New Jersey, Pennsylvania, Delaware, Maryland, Virginia, North Carolina, South Carolina, and Georgia) France Spain Dutch Republic; Combatants: Br. Canadien, Cong. rgts. (Note: Two independent "COR" Regiments, the Congress's Own Regiments, were recruited among British Canadiens. The 1st Canadian Regiment formed by James Livingston of Chambly, Quebec; and the 2nd Canadian Regiment formed by Moses Hazen of Saint-Jean-sur-Richelieu, Quebec.); Br. Canadien mil., Fr. led (Note: Augustin de La Balme independently marched on Detroit under a French flag with British Canadien militia recruited from western Quebec (Illinois County, Virginia) at the county seat of Kaskaskia, Cahokia, and Vincennes.); Native Americans: Oneida; Tuscarora; Catawba; Lenape; Chickasaw; Choctaw; Mohican; Mi'kmaq (Note: (until 1779)); Abenaki; Pedee; Lumbee	American and allied victory: Signing of the United States Declaration of Independence in 1776.; Great Britain would not recognize American independence until signing the Treaty of Paris.; Peace of Paris; End of the First British Empire; Great Britain cedes generally, all mainland territories east of the Mississippi River, south of the Great Lakes, and north of the Floridas to the United States.; Great Britain cedes Tobago and Senegal to France.; Great Britain cedes Minorca, West Florida, and East Florida to Spain.}}
War of 1812 (1812–1815)	United Kingdom; Tecumseh's confederacy; Red Sticks; Menominee; Six Nations of the Grand River; (Spain) West Florida (1813-1814)	United States; Cherokee; Chickasaw; Choctaw; Lower Creek; Tuscarora	Inconclusive (Note: see Results of the War of 1812): Anglo-American status quo ante bellum; West Florida remained under Spanish control, although its position was weakened; Mobile comes under American control; Tecumseh's confederacy dissolved
Pemmican War (1812–1821)	North West Company	Hudson's Bay Company; Red River Colony	NWC and HBC merge
Shiners' War (1835–1845)	Shiners (Irish timber workers)	Canadien timber workers Local authorities	Shiners defeated: Peace restored in the Ottawa Valley
Rebellions of 1837–1838 (1837–1838)	Lower Canada; Château Clique Upper Canada; Family Compact	Patriotes; Republic of Lower Canada Reform movement Republic of Canada; Hunters' Lodges	Government victory: Patriote rebellion crushed by loyalist forces; Republic of Canada dismantled; Defeat of Hunters' Lodges; Unification of Upper and Lower Canada into the Province of Canada
Nicola's War (1838)	Hudson's Bay Company	Okanagan; Nlaka'pamux	Peace agreement reached
Fraser Canyon War (1858)	White gold miners (American prospectors)	Nlaka'pamux	Truce signed: Snyder Treaty negotiated
Pig War (1859)	United Kingdom: Colony of Vancouver Island	United States: Washington Territory	Inconclusive: A bloodless war (1859) — San Juan Islands awarded to the United States following third-party arbitration by the German Empire (1871).
McGowan's War (1859)	Colony of British Columbia; Royal Engineers	Ned McGowan and American miners	British victory: American miners submit to British authority
Rock Creek War (1860)	Colony of British Columbia	American miners	British victory: British authorities re-established law and order
Tobacco Plains War (1860s)	Ktunaxa	Blackfoot Confederacy	Inconclusive: Truce established
Rossland War (1860s)	Local miners	Native forces / Rival miners	Inconclusive
Lamalcha War (1863)	Colony of Vancouver Island; Royal Navy	Lamalcha (Hul'qumi'num)	British victory: Lamalcha leaders captured and executed
Chilcotin War (1864)	Tsilhqot'in	Colony of British Columbia	Colonial victory: Tsilhqot'in leaders executed
Fisherville War (1864)	Colony of British Columbia British colonial authorities	American miners	British victory: Colonial authority maintained
Grouse Creek War (1867)	Canadian Company miners	Grouse Creek Company miners Colony of British Columbia	Bloodless resolution: Dispute settled by Governor Frederick Seymour

=== Canada (1867–present) ===
The following table lists conflicts involving Canada since confederation in 1867. Since that time there have been 26 conflicts with 2 of them currently ongoing:

Conflict	Combatant 1	Combatant 2	Result	Killed	Wounded
Fenian raids (1866–1871)	Canada (Note: Raids conducted in 1866 occurred in the Province of Canada, and the colony of New Brunswick, prior to Canadian confederation)	Fenian Brotherhood	Victory: Fenians cease raids	22	32
Red River Rebellion (1869–1870)	Canada	Métis	Métis political victory: Red River Colony enters Canadian Confederation as the Province of Manitoba; Canadian military victory: The Wolseley Expedition takes control of Fort Garry (modern day Winnipeg); Louis Riel flees to the United States	1	Unknown
Mahdist War (1881–1899)	United Kingdom; Canada; Egypt	Sudan	Victory: Sudan becomes the Anglo-Egyptian Sudan, a condominium of the British Empire	16	Unknown
North-West Rebellion (1885)	Canada	Provisional Government of Saskatchewan (Métis); Cree–Assiniboine	Victory: Completion of the Canadian Pacific Railway; Trial of Louis Riel	50	103
Wild Horse Creek War (1887)	Canada; North-West Mounted Police	Ktunaxa	Victory: Bloodless settlement of land dispute	0	0
Second Boer War (1899–1902)	United Kingdom; Canada; Australia; New Zealand; India; Ceylon; Cape Colony; Natal Colony; Rhodesia	Orange Free State; South African Republic	Victory: British sovereignty over the Orange Free State and the Transvaal in accordance with the Treaty of Vereeniging	267	>250
First World War (1914–1918)	France; United Kingdom; Russia; United States (Republic of China (1912–1949)) China; Italy; Japan; Canada; Newfoundland; Australia; New Zealand; India; South Africa; Serbia; Montenegro; Romania; Belgium; Greece; Portugal; Brazil	Germany; Austria-Hungary; Ottoman Empire; Bulgaria	Victory: End of the German, Russian, Ottoman, and Austro-Hungarian empires; Formation of new countries in Europe and the Middle East; Transfer of German colonies and regions of the former Ottoman Empire to other powers; Establishment of the League of Nations	66,944	~172,000
Russian Civil War (1918–1920)	(Russia) White Movement; France; United Kingdom; United States (Republic of China (1912–1949)) China; Italy; Japan; Canada; Australia; India; South Africa; Serbia; Romania; Greece; Czechoslovakia; Poland; Estonia	Russian SFSR; Far Eastern Republic; Latvian SSR; Ukrainian SSR; Commune of Estonia; Mongolian Communists	Bolshevik victory: Victory for the Bolshevik Red Army in Russia, Ukraine, Belarus, South Caucasus, Central Asia, Tuva, and Mongolia; incorporation of those territories into the Russian SFSR and Soviet Union; Allied forces withdrawal from Russia; Bolshevik victory over White Army; The Soviet Union becomes the new Russian power; Russian famine of 1921–1922; Victory for pro-independence and anti communist movements in Finland, Estonia, Latvia, Lithuania, and Poland; expulsion of Bolshevik forces from those territories	14	24
Second World War (1939–1945)	Soviet Union; United States; United Kingdom; China; France; Poland; Canada; Australia; New Zealand; India; South Africa; Yugoslavia; Greece; Denmark; Norway; Netherlands; Belgium; Luxembourg; Czechoslovakia; Brazil; Mexico; Ethiopia	Germany; Japan; Italy; Hungary; Romania; Bulgaria; Croatia; Slovakia; Finland; Vichy France; Thailand; Manchukuo; Mengjiang	Victory: Collapse of the Third Reich; Fall of Japanese and Italian Empires; Creation of the United Nations; Emergence of the United States and the Soviet Union as superpowers; Beginning of the Cold War; Beginning of the Atomic Age	~45,300	~55,000
Korean War (1950–1953)	South Korea; United Nations; United States; United Kingdom; Australia; Belgium; Canada; France; Philippines; Colombia; Ethiopia; Greece; Luxembourg; Netherlands; New Zealand; South Africa; Thailand; Turkey	North Korea; China; Soviet Union	Ceasefire/Inconclusive: Ceasefire armistice; North Korean invasion of South Korea repelled; UN invasion of North Korea repelled; Chinese invasion of South Korea repelled; Korean Demilitarized Zone established; Little territorial change at the 38th parallel border	516	1,042
Congo Crisis (1960–1963)	Congo-Léopoldville (United Nations) UNOC	Katanga; South Kasai	Victory	Unknown	Unknown
Insurgency in Quebec (1962–1973)	Canada	Front de libération du Québec	Victory: FLQ guerrillas are disbanded in 1973, after collapse in 1971.	Unknown	Unknown
Whisky War (1973–2022)	Canada	Denmark: Greenland	Bloodless resolution: Hans island split between Canada and Denmark.	None	None
Oka Crisis (1990)	Canada	Mohawk Warrior Society	See aftermath: End of Mohawk blockade; Federal government purchased the Pines from Municipality of Oka to prevent further development	1	30
Persian Gulf War (1990–1991)	Kuwait; United States; United Kingdom; Saudi Arabia; France; Canada; Egypt; Syria; Qatar; United Arab Emirates; Oman; Bangladesh	Iraq	Victory: Removal of Iraqi invasion force from Kuwait; Imposition of sanctions against Iraq	None	None
Pacific Salmon War (1992–2001)	Canada	United States	Victory: New harvest agreement reached in 1999; Pacific Salmon Treaty revised and signed on 3 June 2001	None	None
Somali Civil War (1992–1995)	United States; United Kingdom; Spain; Saudi Arabia; Malaysia; Pakistan; Italy; India; Greece; Germany; France; Canada; Botswana; Belgium; Australia; New Zealand	(Somalia) Somali National Alliance	Victory: UN humanitarian mandate fulfilled, saving around 100,000 lives; Somalia Affair; Dissolution of Canadian Airborne Regiment; The Somali Civil War is ongoing	1	None
Bosnian War (1992–1995)	Bosnia and Herzegovina; Croatia; NATO: Belgium; Canada; Denmark; France; Germany; Italy; Luxembourg; Netherlands; Norway; Portugal; Spain; Turkey; United Kingdom; United States	Republika Srpska	Victory: Dayton Accords; Internal partition of Bosnia and Herzegovina according to the Dayton Accords; Deployment of NATO-led IFOR to oversee the peace agreement; Massive civilian casualties for the Bosniak ethnic group	23	unknown
Turbot War (1995–1995)	Canada; United Kingdom; Ireland	Spain; European Union	Victory	None	1
Operation Medak Pocket (September 9–17, 1993)	Canada; France Republic of Serbian Krajina	Croatia	Canadian strategic victory: Croatian forces recover Divoselo and Čitluk (in total 48 km^{2}); Croatian withdrawal; UN secures Medak Pocket; Canada holds out against an army three times its size without suffering casualties.	None	4
Kosovo War (1998–1999)	UÇK (KLA); AFRK (FARK); Albania; Croatia; NATO: Belgium; Canada; Czech Republic; Denmark; France; Germany; Hungary; Italy; Luxembourg; Netherlands; Norway; Poland; Portugal; Spain; Turkey; United Kingdom; United States	FR Yugoslavia	Victory: Kumanovo Treaty; Yugoslav security forces pull out of Kosovo; KLA veterans join the UÇPMB, starting the Preševo insurgency	None	None
International Force for East Timor (1999–2000)	Australia; New Zealand; Bangladesh; Brazil; Canada; Denmark; France; Germany; Ireland; Italy; Jordan; Kenya; Malaysia; Norway; Philippines; Portugal; Singapore; South Korea; Thailand; United States	(Indonesia) Pro-Indonesian militia	Victory: Defeat of pro-Indonesian militia; Stability in East Timor; Arrival of UN peacekeepers	None	None
War in Afghanistan (2001–2014)	Afghanistan; United States; United Kingdom; Germany; Italy; France; Canada; Australia; New Zealand; Georgia; Poland; Romania; Turkey ISAF: Albania; Armenia; Austria; Azerbaijan; Bahrain; Belgium; Bosnia and Herzegovina; Bulgaria; Croatia; Czech Republic; Denmark; El Salvador; Estonia; Finland; Greece; Hungary; Iceland; Ireland; Jordan; Latvia; Lithuania; Luxembourg; Malaysia; Mongolia; Montenegro; Netherlands; Norway; Portugal; Republic of Macedonia; Singapore; Slovakia; Slovenia; South Korea; Spain; Sweden; Switzerland; Tonga; Ukraine; United Arab Emirates; (Afghanistan) Northern Alliance	Taliban al-Qaeda; Islamic Movement of Uzbekistan; HI-Gulbuddin; Hezb-e Islami Khalis; Haqqani network Lashkar-e-Taiba; Jaish-e-Mohammed; East Turkestan Islamic Movement; Tehrik-i-Taliban Pakistan; Islamic Emirate of Waziristan; Tehreek-e-Nafaz-e-Shariat-e-Mohammadi; Islamic Jihad Union Islamic Emirate of Afghanistan	Taliban victory: Fall of the Taliban government in Afghanistan; Destruction of al-Qaeda camps; Over two thirds of al-Qaeda's leadership demolished; Occupation of Afghanistan; Establishment of a new Afghan government; Killing of Osama bin Laden; Withdrawal of allied forces, including Canada in 2014.; Taliban victory in Afghanistan in the year 2021 after an effective resurgence; Fall of the Afghan National Army (ANA), which was previously trained by Canadian soldiers; Taliban control of US weapons and equipment following the rapid withdrawal of allied forces	166	2,071
First Libyan Civil War (2011)	(Libya) NTC; Qatar; NATO: Belgium; Bulgaria; Canada; Denmark; France; Greece; Italy; Netherlands; Norway; Romania; Spain; Turkey; United Kingdom; United States; Sweden; Jordan; United Arab Emirates	Libya	Victory: Overthrow of Muammar Gaddafi in Libya; Death of Muammar Gaddafi; Dissolution of the Libyan Arab Jamahiriya	None	None
Iraqi Civil War (2013–2017)	Iraq; Assyrian Forces (Iraqi command); Iraqi Turkmen Front; Iraqi Communist Party; Iran; Hezbollah; Syria Iraqi Kurdistan; Assyrian Forces (Kurdish command); Sinjar Alliance; PKK; Rojava CJTF–OIR; United States; United Kingdom; Canada; Australia; France; Italy; Netherlands; Finland; Denmark	Islamic State (Ba'athist Iraq) Naqshbandi Army (2013–15)	Victory: Iraqi territorial integrity preserved; ISIL expelled from all strongholds by 11 November 2017; Iraq declares the defeat of ISIL on 9 December 2017 after securing the western desert with neighbouring Syria; End of open conflict and return of relative stability to Iraq following the end of the war	1	Unknown
Military intervention against the Islamic State of Iraq and the Levant (2014–present)	United States; United Kingdom; Australia; Belgium; Canada; Denmark; France; Germany; Italy; Netherlands; New Zealand; Norway; Portugal; Spain; Sweden; Turkey	Islamic State of Iraq and the Levant	Ongoing: Airstrikes on ISIL and al-Qaeda affiliates positions in Iraq and Syria; Multinational humanitarian effort; Arming and support for local ground forces; 2 American journalists, 2 British humanitarian workers, and 1 French tourist executed; As of February 2016, Canada has discontinued bombing ISIS positions but still has special operations units in Iraq	2	At Least 3
Red Sea crisis (2023–present)	Israel Prosperity Guardian: United States; United Kingdom; Australia; Bahrain; Canada; Denmark; New Zealand; Norway; Seychelles; Singapore; Sri Lanka; Aspides: European Union; Belgium; Estonia; Finland; France; Germany; Greece; Italy; Latvia; Netherlands; Sweden; Independent Patrols: China; Egypt; India; Pakistan; Saudi Arabia	Houthi Yemen (Note: Political legitimacy of all Houthi-led government bodies has been rejected by the United Nations, rival Yemeni factions, the Gulf Cooperation Council, and the United States.): Houthis; Axis of Resistance; Iran (Note: Multiple sources indicate that the Iranian government has deployed military personnel to Houthi-controlled Yemen who are actively involved in attacks on commercial shipping.); Hezbollah; Islamic Resistance in Iraq	Ongoing: Bankruptcy of the Port of Eilat; Disruption of international maritime trade and supply chain; Beginning of Operation Sankalp on 14 December 2023; Beginning of Operation Prosperity Guardian on 18 December 2023; Missile strikes against Houthi-controlled territory started in January 2024; Beginning of Operation Aspides on 19 February 2024; Intensification of US airstrikes in March 2025; Ceasefire between the US and Houthis	Unknown	Unknown

== See also ==
- List of Anglo-French conflicts on Hudson Bay
- List of Canadian military operations
- List of Canadian peacekeeping missions
- List of massacres in Canada
