= Hessian (soldier) =

German soldiers contracted by the British in the American Revolutionary War

Hessians
- c. 1783 illustration of Hessian troops
- Country: Landgraviate of Hesse-Kassel; Hesse-Hanau; Duchy of Brunswick-Lüneburg; Principality of Ansbach; Principality of Anhalt-Zerbst; Principality of Waldeck
- Part of: Attached but not incorporated into the British Army
- Engagements: American Revolutionary War: Battle of Long Island; Landing at Kip's Bay; Battle of Edgar's Lane; Battle of White Plains; Battle of Fort Washington; Battle of Fort Lee; Battle of Iron Works Hill; Battle of Trenton; Forage War; Battle of Bound Brook; Battle of Short Hills; Siege of Fort Ticonderoga; Battle of Hubbardton; Siege of Fort Stanwix; Battle of Bennington; Battle of Staten Island; Battle of Cooch's Bridge; Battle of Brandywine; Battle of the Clouds; Battles of Saratoga; Battle of Germantown; Battle of Red Bank; Battle of Gloucester; Battle of White Marsh; Battle of Barren Hill; Battle of Monmouth; Great Siege of Gibraltar; Capture of Fort Bute; Battle of Baton Rouge; Siege of Charleston; Battle of Connecticut Farms; Battle of Springfield; Battle of Mobile; Siege of Pensacola; Battle of Spencer's Ordinary; Battle of Green Spring; Battle of Groton Heights; Siege of Yorktown; Battle of Johnstown; Raid on Lunenburg; Irish Rebellion of 1798

Commanders
- Notable commanders: Leopold Philip de Heister; Wilhelm von Knyphausen; Johann Rall †

Hessians (US: /ˈhɛʃənz/ or UK: /ˈhɛsiənz/) were German soldiers who served as auxiliaries to the British Army in several major wars in the 18th century, most notably in the American Revolutionary War. The term is a synecdoche for all Germans who fought on the British side, since 65% came from the German states of Hessen-Kassel and Hessen-Hanau. Known for their discipline and martial prowess, around 30,000 to 37,000 Hessians fought in the war, comprising approximately 25% of British land forces.

While regarded both contemporaneously and historiographically as mercenaries, Hessians were legally distinguished as auxiliaries: whereas mercenaries served a foreign government on their own accord, auxiliaries were soldiers hired out to a foreign party by their own government, to which they remained in service. Auxiliaries were a major source of income for many small and relatively poor German states, typically serving in wars in which their governments were otherwise neutral. Like most auxiliaries of this period, Hessians were attached to foreign armies as entire units, fighting under their own flags, commanded by their usual officers, and wearing their existing uniforms.

Hessians played an essential role in the Revolutionary War, particularly in the northern theater. They served with distinction in many battles, most notably at White Plains and Fort Washington. The added manpower and abilities of German troops greatly sustained the British war effort—at some points accounting for up to one-third of British strength—but also outraged colonists and increased support for the Revolutionary cause. The use of "large armies of foreign mercenaries" is mentioned in the 25th of the 27 colonial grievances against King George III in the Declaration of Independence, and the Patriots cited the deployment of Hessians as proof of British violations of the colonists' rights.

== History ==
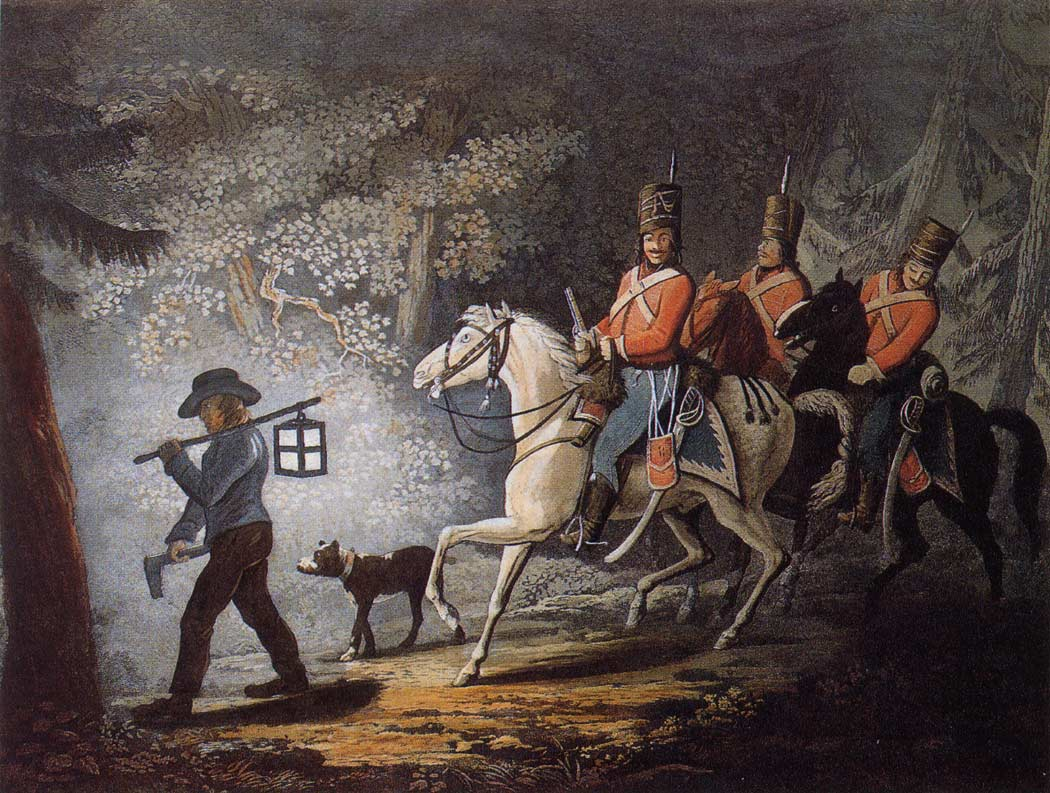
1799 illustration of Hessian hussars during the Revolutionary War

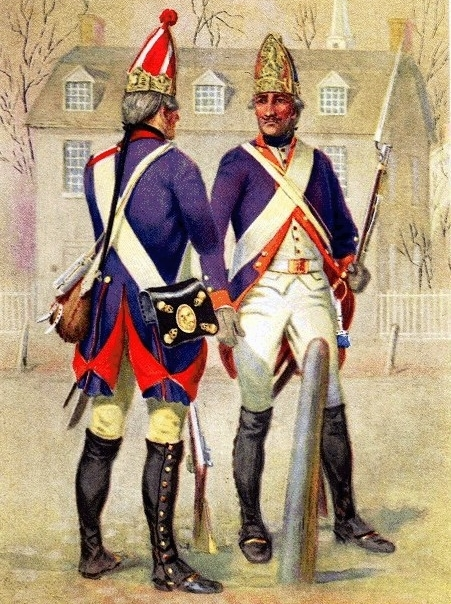
Hessian grenadiers

The use of foreign soldiers was common in 18th-century Europe. In the two centuries leading up to the American Revolutionary War, the continent saw frequent, though often small-scale, warfare, and military manpower was in high demand. Germany was not yet a unified nation, but a collection of several hundred states loosely organized under the Holy Roman Empire. Conflict between these states led to the creation of professional armies, which were consequently experienced and well trained. Many German societies became militarized, with most men undergoing annual training from adolescence well into adulthood, often serving for life or until they were too old. Several poorer German states came to rely on their troops as an economic resource, especially since sustaining a standing army was costly.

When military conflict broke out, German states provided a ready supply of trained troops prepared to enter military action immediately. The Landgraviate of Hesse-Kassel soon emerged as the most prominent source of German soldiers to foreign armies. To field a large professional army with a relatively small population, Hesse-Kassel became the most militarized state in Europe: All Hessian males registered for military service at age seven, and from age 16 until 30 were required to present themselves annually to an official for possible recruitment. Only those whose occupation was considered vital to the country were exempted; those deemed expendable, such as vagrants and the unemployed, could be conscripted at any time. During the 18th century, approximately 5.2% to 14.2% of Hesse-Kassel's population were under arms, with one in four households having someone serving in the army—a larger proportion than even heavily militarized Prussia. Whereas Prussia relied partly on mercenaries from other German states, Hesse-Kassel employed only Landeskinder—literally "children of the land", or native men.

Hessian military service was notably strict and demanding, emphasizing iron discipline through draconian punishment. Deserters were summarily executed or beaten by an entire company. Morale was generally high, and soldiers were said to take pride in their service. Officers were usually well educated, and unlike most European armies, promoted on the basis of merit. Soldiers were paid relatively high wages, and their families were exempt from certain taxes. Although plunder was officially forbidden, it remained common practice—as in most military forces at the time—offering another incentive for service. Overall, Hessian troops were considered superb fighters, even by their opponents.

The Hessian military became a major source of economic strength and was the dominant force in society. Hesse-Kassel manufactured its own weapons and uniforms, and its textile industry was so prosperous from supplying the military that workers could afford to buy meat and wine every day. The revenue from renting the army to the British equaled roughly 13 years' worth of taxes, allowing the Landgrave of Hesse-Kassel, Friedrich II, to reduce taxes by one-third between the 1760s and 1784. A self-styled enlightened despot, he also oversaw public-works projects, administered a public welfare system, and encouraged education. American historian Edward Jackson Lowell lauded Friedrich II for spending British money wisely, describing him as "one of the least disreputable of the princes who sent mercenaries to America".

Prior to the American Revolutionary War, Hessian soldiers were familiar in battlefields across 18th century Europe.

Between 1706 and 1707, 10,000 Hessians served as a corps in Eugene of Savoy's army in Italy before moving to the Spanish Netherlands in 1708. In 1714, 6,000 Hessians were rented to Sweden for its war with Russia whilst 12,000 Hessians were hired by George I of Great Britain in 1715 to combat the Jacobite Rebellion. ... In the midst of the War of the Austrian Succession in 1744, 6,000 Hessians were fighting with the British army in Flanders, whilst another 6,000 were in the Bavarian army. By 1762, 24,000 Hessians were serving with Ferdinand of Brunswick's army in Germany.

— John Childs, Rethinking Leviathan

In most of these wars, Hesse-Hanau was never formally a belligerent. While its troops remained members of the Hessian military, and even fought in their national uniform, they were hired out for service in other armies, without their government having any stake in the conflict. Thus, Hessians could serve on opposing sides of the same conflict. In the War of the Austrian Succession, both Britain and Bavaria employed Hessian soldiers against one another. In the Seven Years' War, the forces of Hesse-Kassel served with both the Anglo-Hanoverian and the Prussian armies against the French; although Hesse-Kassel was technically allied to Britain and Prussia, her troops were actually leased by the British.

Notwithstanding its formal neutrality in many of these conflicts, the practice of lending out auxiliaries did sometimes draw Hesse-Kassel into war. In July 1758, during the course of the Seven Years' War, most of the country, including its capital of Cassel, was occupied by a French army under Charles de Rohan, Prince of Soubise, which easily overcame the home defence force of 6,000 Hessian militiamen. Soubise ordered his troops to live off the land, take high-ranking hostages, and extort payments of cash and produce, with the intention of forcing Hessian troops to withdraw from the war. Hessian and allied forces attempted to liberate their homeland but were repulsed at the Battle of Sandershausen on 23 July. Following two sieges in 1761 and 1762, Cassel was retaken, which constituted the last military action of the war.

=== "Mercenaries" versus "auxiliaries" ===
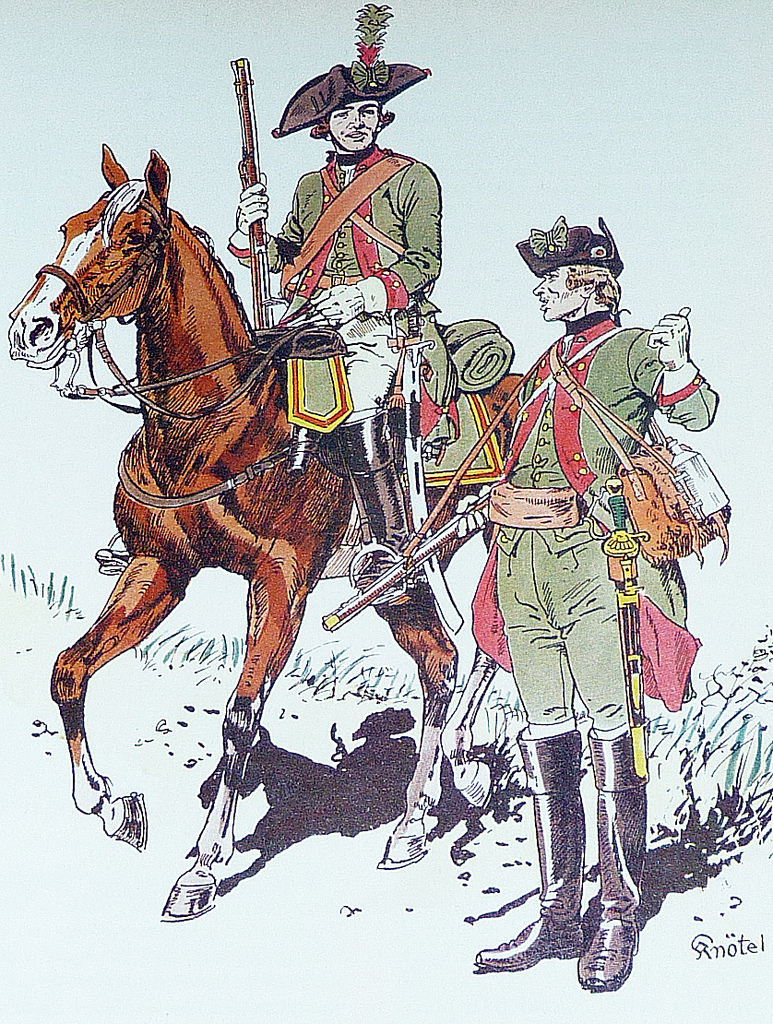
Two soldiers of Creuzbourg's Jäger Corps

The characterization of Hessian troops as "mercenaries" remains controversial. American history textbooks refer to them as "mercenaries", and they are still widely perceived as such in the popular imagination of the United States. American historian Charles Ingrao describes Hesse as a "mercenary state" whose prince rented out his regiments to fund his governmental expenditures. By contrast, British historian Stephen Conway referred to them as "auxiliaries". Military historians Dennis Showalter and Rodney Atwood note that Hessians would not have been legally considered mercenaries at the time, but rather auxiliaries. Whereas mercenaries served a foreign ruler in an individual capacity, auxiliaries forces were controlled by a state, and their foreign service was in direct competition to professional mercenaries. Similarly, in the twentieth century, the Moroccan Goumiers were attached as auxiliaries to the French Army of Africa.

Hessians would not be categorized as mercenaries under modern international law. Protocol I (1977) to the Geneva Convention defines a mercenary as "any person who ... has not been sent by a State which is not a Party to the conflict on official duty as a member of its armed forces." Hessian troops served in America on official duty from the armed forces of Hesse-Cassel and Hesse-Hanau. Protocol I also requires a mercenary to be "promised, by or on behalf of a Party to the conflict, material compensation substantially in excess of that promised or paid to combatants of similar ranks and functions in the armed forces of that Party." While not formally incorporated into the British military, Hessian troops were paid the same wages as British soldiers.

=== American Revolutionary War ===
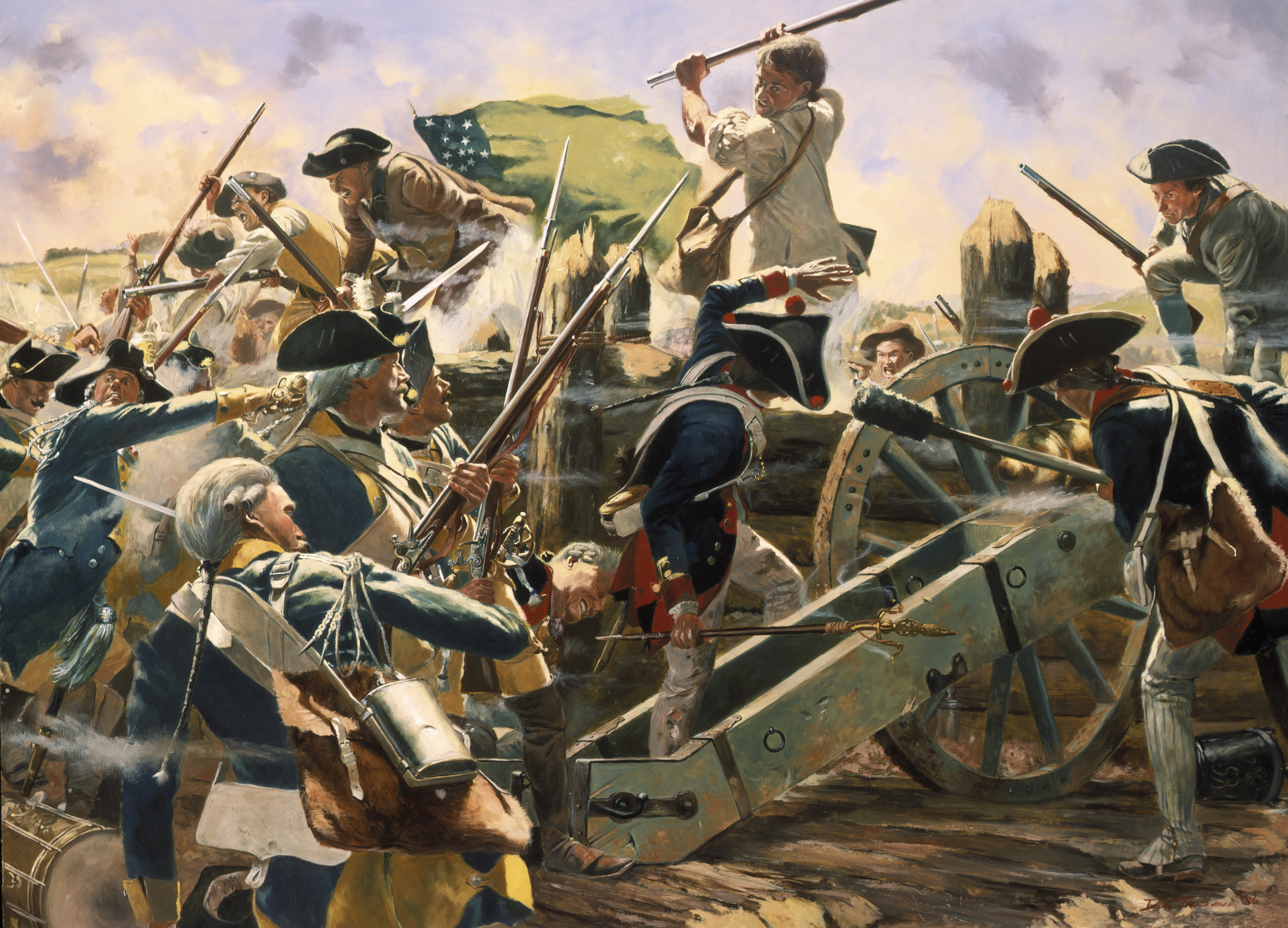
Hessian troops (foreground) at the Battle of Bennington

Britain maintained a relatively small standing army, so it found itself in great need of troops at the outset of the American Revolutionary War. Several German princes saw an opportunity to earn extra income by hiring out their regular army units for service in America. Their troops entered the British service not as individuals, but in entire units, with their usual uniforms, flags, equipment, and officers. Methods of recruitment varied according to the state of origin. The contingent from Waldeck was drawn from an army based on universal conscription, from which only students were exempt. Other German princes relied on long-service voluntary enlistment supplemented by conscription when numbers fell short. Many princes were closely related to the British House of Hanover and were comfortable placing their troops under British command.

A total of 29,875 German troops fought alongside British troops in the Revolutionary War, of which 16,992 came from Hesse-Kassel and 2,422 from Hesse-Hanau. Other contingents came from the Duchy of Brunswick-Lüneburg (4,300), Principality of Ansbach (2,353), Principality of Anhalt-Zerbst (1,119), and Principality of Waldeck (1,225). As the majority of the German troops came from Hesse, Americans use the term "Hessians" to refer to all German troops fighting on the British side.

==== Deployment ====
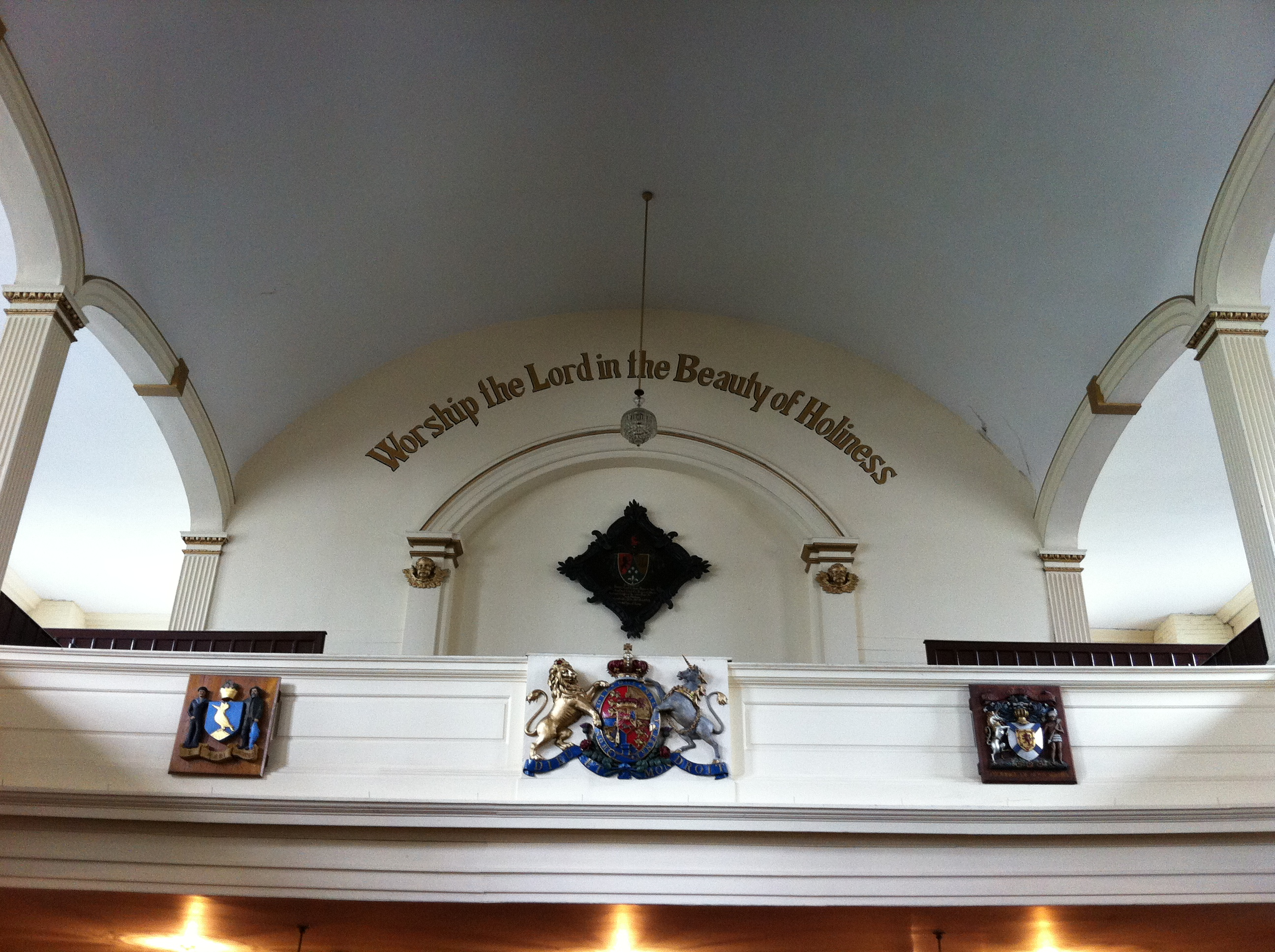
The hatchment of Oberst Franz Carl Erdmann Freiherr von Seitz at St. Paul's Church in Nova Scotia

Hessian troops included Jägers, hussars, three artillery companies, and four battalions of grenadiers. Most infantrymen were chasseurs, including sharpshooters, musketeers, and fusiliers. Line infantry was armed with muskets, while the Hessian artillery used the three-pound cannon. The elite Jäger battalions used the Büchse, a short, large-caliber rifle well-suited to woodland combat. Initially, the typical regiment was made up of 500 to 600 men. Later in the war, due to death in battle, death by disease, and general desertion to settle in the Colonies, the regiments may have been reduced to only around 300 to 400 men.

The first Hessian troops to arrive in British America landed at Staten Island on August 15, 1776, and their first engagement was less than two weeks later in the Battle of Long Island. Hessians proved decisive to the British victory, and they subsequently fought in almost every battle that year.

By 1777, the British used them mainly as garrison and patrol troops. Hessians fought at the Battle of Bennington, the turning point of the Saratoga campaign. At Saratoga, approximately 1,000 Hessians were defeated; being killed or captured by a raw, untrained militia force from Vermont, New Hampshire, and Massachusetts. General John Burgoyne lost 1,000 of his 8,000 soldiers at Bennington, and the loss of so many Hessians doomed his army later. An assortment of Hessians fought in the battles and campaigns in the southern states during 1778–1780, including at the Guilford Court House, and two regiments fought at the Siege of Yorktown in 1781. Hessians also served in Nova Scotia for five years (1778–1783), where they protected the colony from American privateers, such as during the 1782 Raid on Lunenburg.

Notwithstanding their reputation as skilled and disciplined fighters, many British soldiers shared the American distrust of Hessians, who often spoke little or no English and were perceived as crude and barbaric. Numerous minor incidents strained the relationship between the British and Hessians:

The chaplain then recounts the case of a Jaeger subaltern who was assailed "by an Englishman in his cups" with the declaration: "God damn you, Frenchy, you take our pay!" The outraged Hessian replied: "I am a German and you are a shit." This was followed by an impromptu duel with hangers, in which the Englishman received a fatal wound. The chaplain records that General Howe pardoned the Jaeger officer and issued an order that "the English should treat the Germans as brothers." This order began to have influence only when "our Germans, teachable as they are" had learned to "stammer a little English." Apparently, this was a prerequisite for the English to show them any affection.

=== American attitudes ===
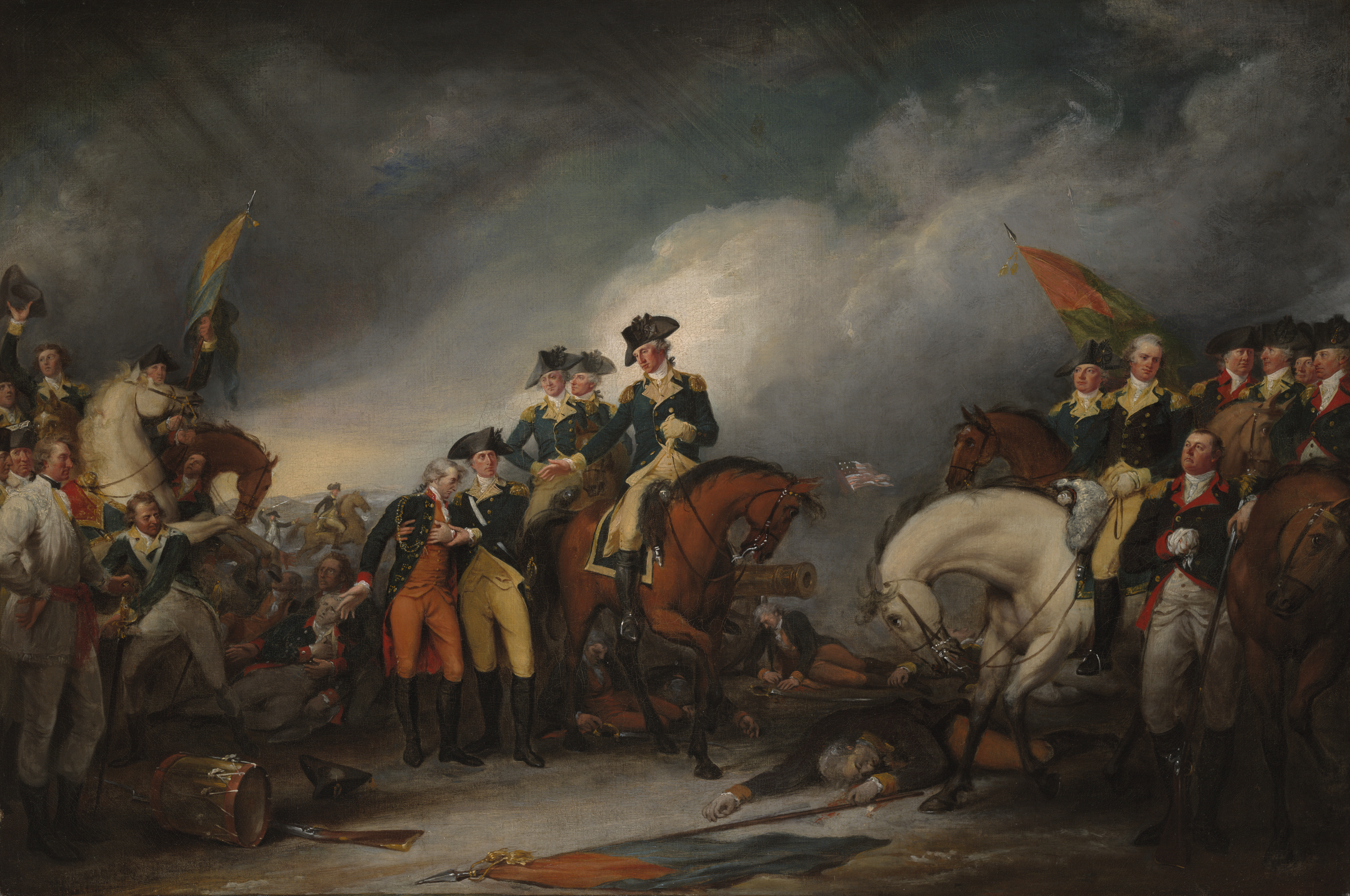
The Capture of the Hessians at Trenton, December 26, 1776

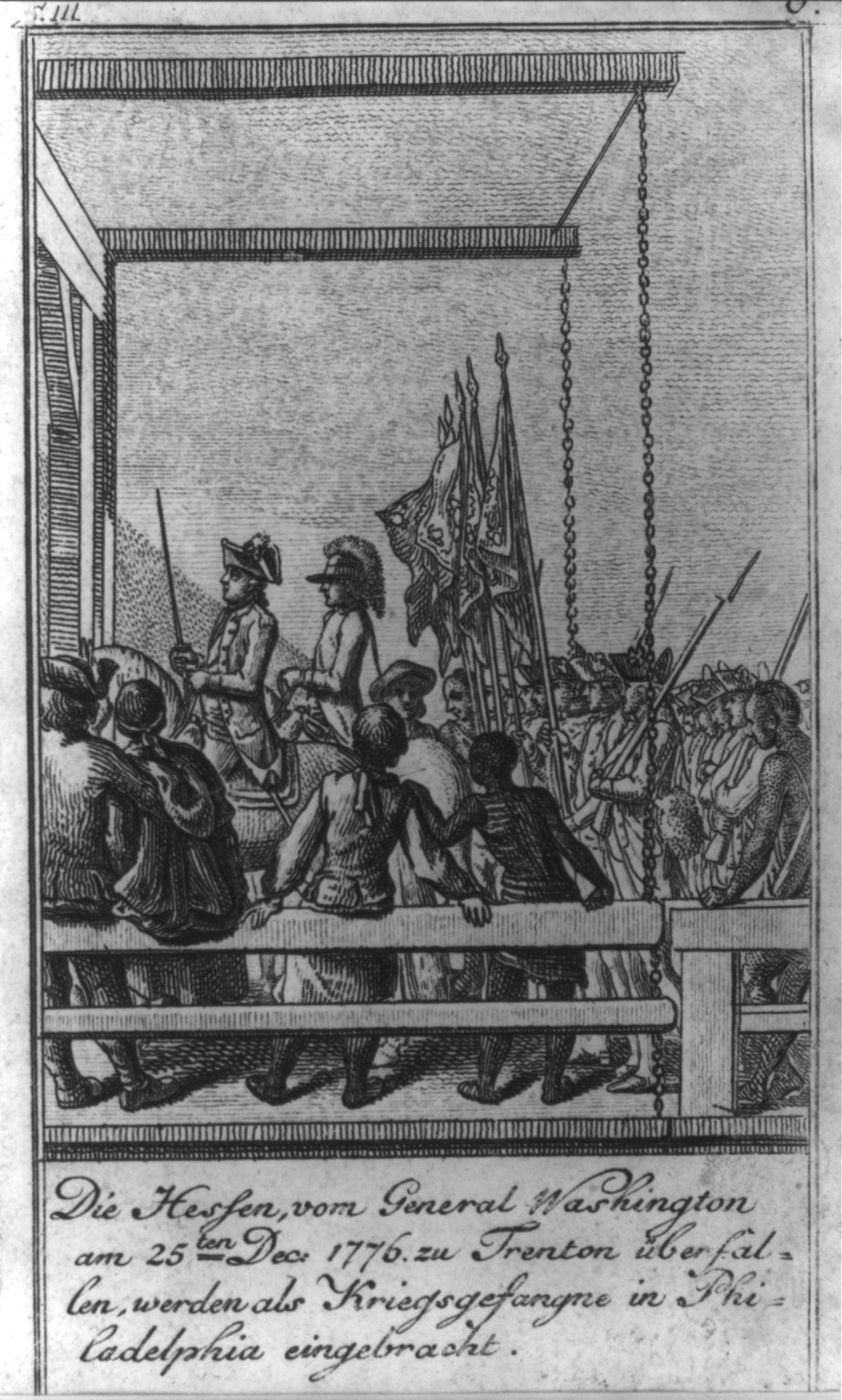
Hessian troops captured at the Battle of Trenton and taken to Philadelphia

Americans, both Revolutionaries and Loyalists, often feared the Hessians, believing them to be rapacious and brutal mercenaries. The American Declaration of Independence, written roughly a year after hostilities broke out, condemned King George III for "transporting large Armies of foreign Mercenaries to [complete] the works of death, desolation and tyranny, already begun with circumstances of Cruelty & perfidy scarcely paralleled in the most barbarous ages, and totally unworthy the Head of a civilized nation." Throughout the war, reports of plundering by Hessians were said to have galvanized neutral colonists to join the Revolutionary side.

General Washington's Continental Army had crossed the Delaware River to make a surprise attack on the Hessians in the early morning of December 26, 1776. In the Battle of Trenton, the Hessian force of 1,400 was quickly overwhelmed by the Continentals, with only about 20 killed and 100 wounded, but 1,000 captured.

Hessians captured in the Battle of Trenton were paraded through the streets of Philadelphia to raise American morale; anger at their presence helped the Continental Army recruit new soldiers. Most of the prisoners were sent to work as farmhands.

By early 1778, negotiations for the exchange of prisoners between Washington and the British had begun in earnest. These included Nicholas Bahner(t), Jacob Trobe, George Geisler, and Conrad Grein (Konrad Krain), who were a few of the Hessian soldiers who deserted the British forces after being returned in exchange for American prisoners of war.

Throughout the Revolutionary War, Americans tried to entice Hessians to desert the British, emphasizing the large and prosperous German-American community in the Colonies. The Continental Congress authorized the offer of land of up to 50 acres (roughly 20 hectares) to individual Hessian soldiers who switched sides. British soldiers were offered 50 to 800 acres, depending on rank.

Many Hessian prisoners were held in camps at the interior city of Lancaster, Pennsylvania, home to a large German community known as the Pennsylvania Dutch. A large Hessian prison camp was also located at the nearby city of Reading. German prisoners were treated well, with some volunteering for extra work assignments, helping to replace local men serving in the Continental Army. After the Revolutionary War, many Hessian prisoners of war never returned to Germany and instead chose to accept American offers of religious freedom and free land, becoming permanent settlers. By contrast, British prisoners were also held in Lancaster, but these men did not respond favorably to good treatment and often tried to escape.

After the war ended in 1783, some 17,313 German soldiers returned to their homelands. Of the 12,526 who did not return, about 7,700 were killed in action or died; some 1,200 were killed in action, and 6,354 died from illnesses or accidents, mostly the former. About 5,000 German troops, most of whom had been press-ganged or conscripted in their countries of origin, opted to settle in either the United States or Canada.

=== Hessian views ===
Upon their arrival in North America, most Hessians were struck by the prosperous socioeconomic state of the American colonies, "which led them to conclude that the revolution had been perpetrated by sinister conspirators acting for their own interests". Despite coming from societies with high levels of economic stratification and elements of serfdom, many Hessians were disgusted with the brutality of American slavery and the general mistreatment of Black people by White Americans. Hessian troops occasionally recruited Black men or boys as servants or military musicians, perceiving them as exotic, while generally regarding Indians as brutal and treacherous savages due in part to their practice of scalping fallen enemies.

The Hessians initially regarded American troops as an undisciplined rabble, a viewpoint derived from their noticeable lack of standardized uniforms, equipment and organizational competence. However, the series of American victories at Trenton, Bennington, and Saratoga led the Hessians to rethink their assessments of the Americans, increasingly viewing them as professional troops who could fight well when under the command of competent officers. Hessian troops simultaneously began to view British commanders as insufficiently aggressive, a viewpoint which increasingly gained favor among the Hessians as the war dragged on. Hessians who returned to Germany after the conflict ended for the most part "remained proud of their service, and blamed British military and civilian leadership for the defeat."

=== Commanding officers ===
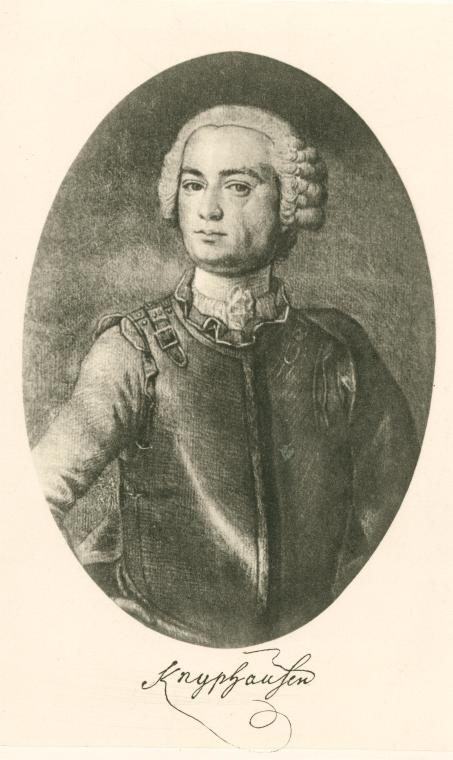
Wilhelm von Knyphausen, commander of the Hessians in the American Revolutionary War

- Wilhelm von Knyphausen
- Oberst Franz Carl Erdmann Freiherr (Baron) von Seitz – led the regiment in the Battle of Fort Washington
- Oberst Johann Rall, commanding officer of the Hessian forces at the Battle of Trenton
- Lieutenant General Friedrich Wilhelm von Lossberg, as Colonel led the von Lossberg Regiment (Alt) at the Battle of White Plains and Fort Washington. He served in Newport from 1776 until 1779 and played a decisive role at the Battle of Rhode Island. In May 1782 upon the departure of Lieutenant General Knyphausen, Lossberg replaced him as the commander of the Hessian troops in North America.

=== Units ===
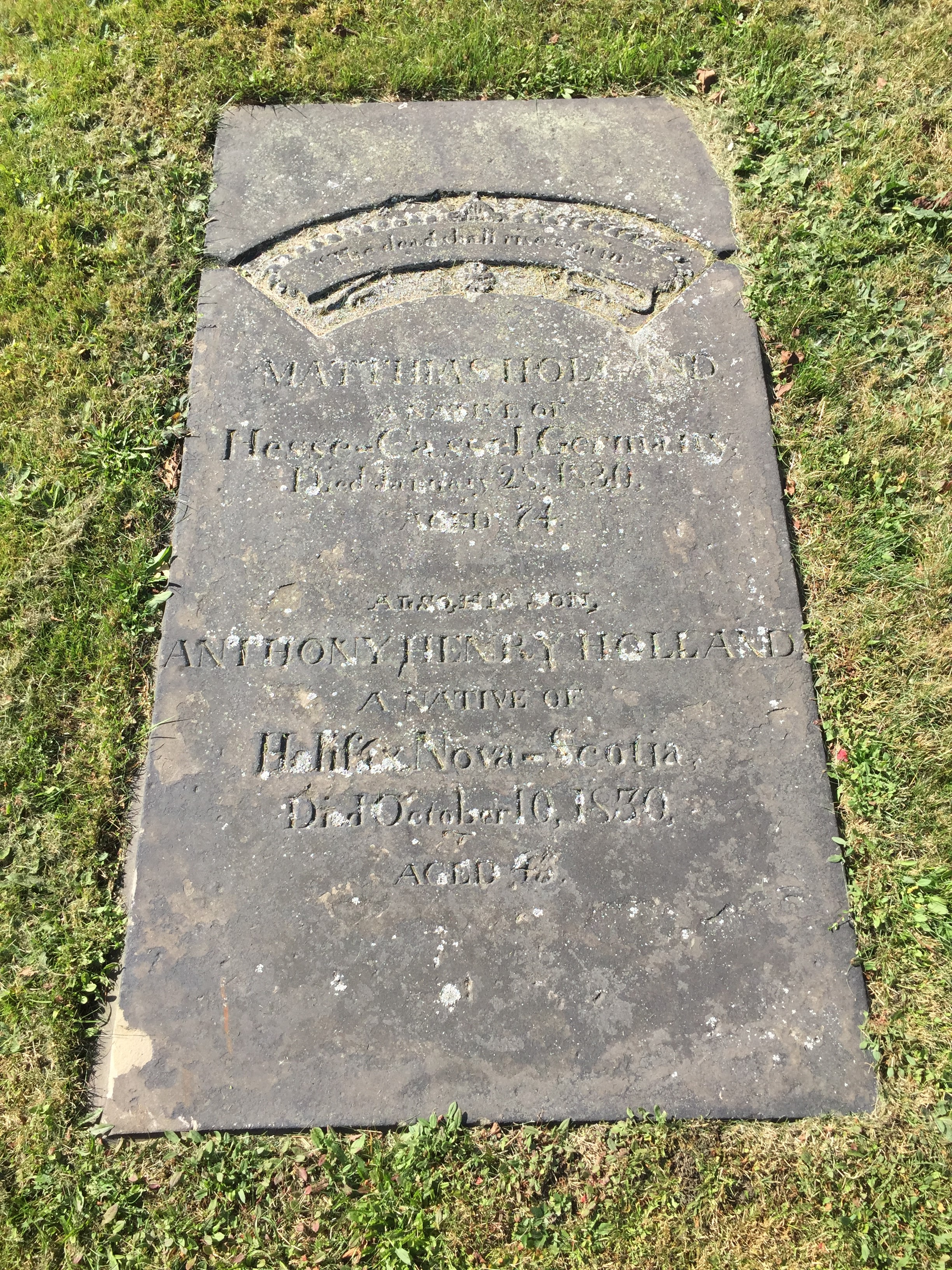
The gravesite of Hessian colonel Johann Holland at Little Dutch Church in Halifax, Nova Scotia

Infantry

- Hesse-Cassel Jäger Corps (Hessisches Jägercorps zu Pferd und zu Fuß)
- Fusilier Regiment von Ditfurth (Füsilier-Regiment "von Ditfurth")
- Fusilier Regiment Erbprinz, later (1780) Musketeer Regiment Erbprinz (Füsilier-Regiment "Erbprinz"; Infanterie-Regiment "Erbprinz")
- Fusilier Regiment von Knyphausen (Füsilier-Regiment "von Knyphausen")
- Fusilier Regiment von Lossberg (Füsilier-Regiment "von Lossberg")
- Grenadier Regiment von Rall, later (1777) von Woellwarth; (1779) von Trümbach; (1781) d'Angelelli (Grenadier-Regiment "von Rall"; "von Woellwarth"; "von Trümbach"; "d'Angelelli")
- Hesse-Hanau Free Corps
- Hesse-Hanau Jägers
- Hesse-Hanau Regiment Erbprinz
- Merged grenadier battalions (from grenadier companies of several fusilier and musketeer regiments):
  - 1st Battalion Grenadiers von Linsing
  - 2nd Battalion Grenadiers von Block (later von Lengerke)
  - 3rd Battalion Grenadiers von Minnigerode (later von Löwenstein)
  - 4th Battalion Grenadiers von Köhler (later von Graf; von Platte)
- Garrison Regiment von Bünau (Garrisons-Regiment)
- Garrison Regiment von Huyn (later von Benning)
- Garrison Regiment von Stein (later von Seitz; von Porbeck)
- Garrison Regiment von Wissenbach (later von Knoblauch)
- Leib Infantry Regiment (Leib-Infanterie-Regiment)
- Musketeer Regiment von Donop
- Musketeer Regiment von Trümbach (later von Bose (1779))
- Musketeer Regiment von Mirbach (later Jung von Lossberg (1780))
- Musketeer Regiment Prinz Carl
- Musketeer Regiment von Wutgenau (later Landgraf (1777))
- First Light Infantry Battalion
- Second Light Infantry Battalion
- First Formation Infantry Battalion
- Second Infantry Battalion
- Third Formation Infantry Battalion
- Fourth Formation Infantry Battalion
- Fifth Formation Infantry Battalion
- Sixth Formation Infantry Battalion
- Seventh Formation Infantry Battalion
- Eighth Formation Infantry Battalion

Cavalry

- First Dragoon Cavalry Regiment (1804–1812, red jacket); change to the First Light Dragoon Cavalry Regiment (1812–1816, blue jacket)
- Second Dragoon Cavalry Regiment (1805–1812, red jacket); change to the Second Light Dragoon Cavalry Regiment (1812–1816, blue jacket)
- First Hussar Regiment
- Second Hussar Regiment
- Third Hussar Regiment

Artillery and engineers

- Hesse-Cassel Artillery corps (Artillerie-Korps)
- Hesse-Hanau Artillery
- King of England and German engineers

== In popular culture ==
- The Hessian fly, a significant pest of cereal crops, was named after its supposed arrival in North America in Hessian soldiers' straw bedding.
- Washington Irving's story "The Legend of Sleepy Hollow" (1820) includes a celebrated figure known as the "Headless Horseman" who is "the ghost of a Hessian trooper, whose head had been carried away by a cannonball, in some nameless battle during the Revolutionary War". He has been portrayed in many dramatic adaptations of the story.
- D. W. Griffith co-wrote and directed the short film, The Hessian Renegades (1909), about the early stages of the American Revolution.
- In the Merrie Melodies short Bunker Hill Bunny (1950), set during the Revolutionary War, Bugs Bunny faces off against Hessian soldier Sam von Schamm. At the end, Sam resigns with the line "I'm a Hessian without no aggression."
- The final episode of the cartoon series The Super 6 (1967) features Capt. Zammo in "The Hessians Are Coming" where, after a parody of Paul Revere's midnight ride, Captain Zammo and Private Hammo are dispatched to zip back in time to 1776 and report to General George Washington to foil the malicious machinations of the marauding invaders.
- The 1972 novel The Hessian, by Howard Fast, concerns a young Hessian drummer who is executed in reprisal for the mistaken hanging of an autistic villager by his officer.
- In the television series Turn: Washington's Spies, Hessians are depicted in season one as participating in the Battle of Trenton and meet Abraham Woodhull in New York.
- The PBS cartoon series, Liberty's Kids, featured Hessians as members of the British Army in several episodes, with the episode, "The Hessians Are Coming" ending with several Hessian troops deserting to the American side.
- In Empire: Total War, the player can recruit up to five regiments of Hessians in their American colonies if playing as Great Britain.
- In Assassin's Creed III, if Ratonhnaké:ton has maximum notoriety, Hessians will be sent after him and are notably more skilled than other types of soldiers in the game.
