= Hesse-Hanau Regiment Erbprinz =

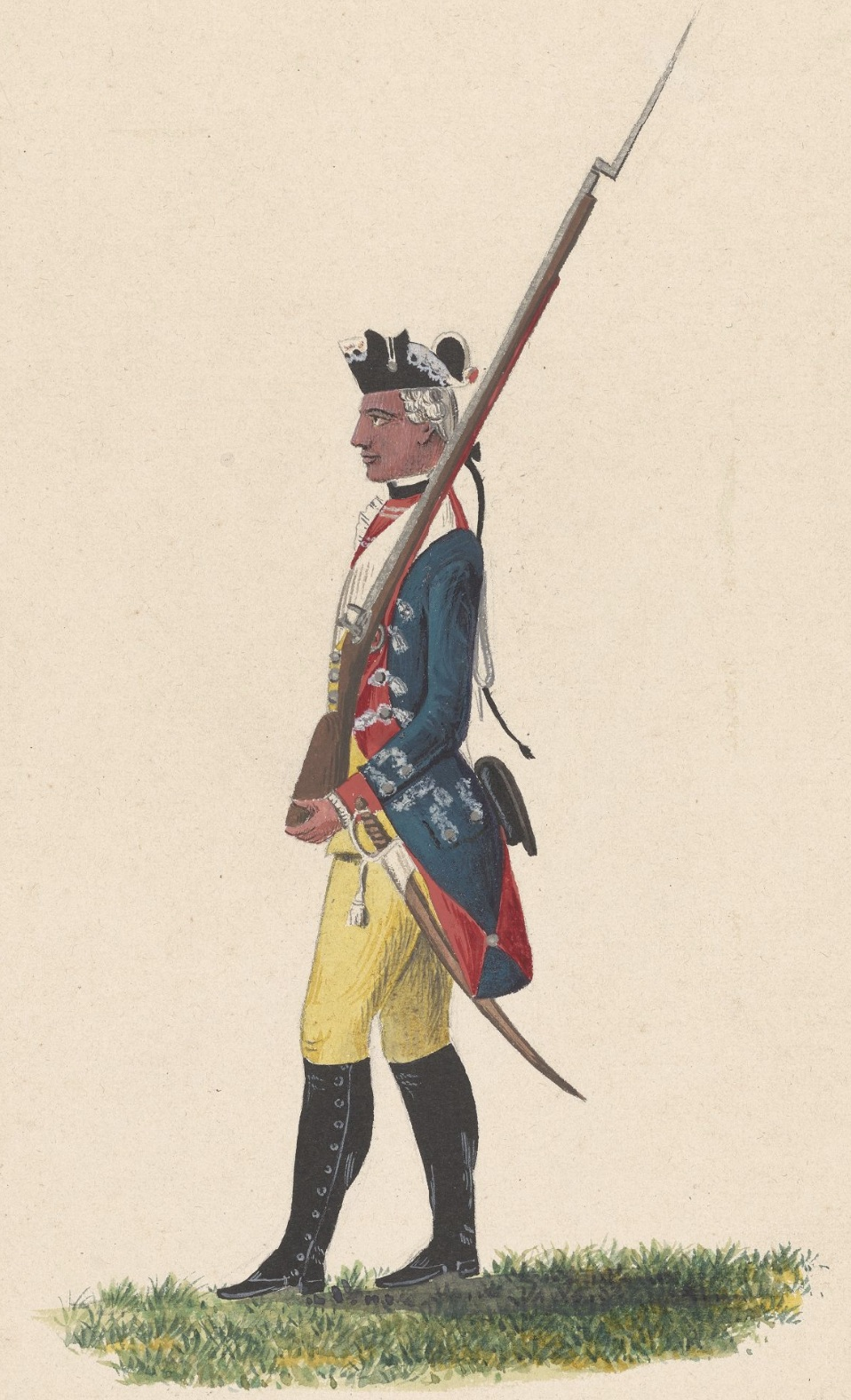
- A regimental private in 1778
- Active: 1776-1783
- Country: Hesse-Hanau
- Allegiance: The British Crown
- Branch: Crown Forces; German allied contingent
- Type: Infantry
- Role: Heavy infantry
- Size: Six companies
- Engagements: American Revolutionary War: Siege of Fort Ticonderoga; Battle of Bennington Battle of Freeman's Farm; Battle of Bemis Heights

Commanders
- Colonel of the Regiment: Hereditary Prince William, Ruling Count of Hesse-Hanau
- Notable commanders: Wilhelm Rudolf von Gall

Hesse-Hanau Regiment Erbprinz was a line infantry regiment raised by Hesse-Hanau and put to the disposition of the British Crown, as part of the German Allied contingent during the American Revolutionary War. It was organized with a grenadier and five regimental companies, commanded by Colonel Wilhelm Rudolf von Gall. The regiment participated in the siege of Ticonderoga 1777, the battle of Freeman's Farm 1777 and the battle of Bemis Heights 1777. It surrendered at Saratoga with the rest of the troops under Burgoyne.

== Formation ==
When the American Revolution began, the British Army was too small to overwhelm the rebellious colonies with armed might. Subsequently, the United Kingdom entered treaties with a number of German principalities which provided the British Crown with allied contingents for service in North America in exchange for monetary subsidies. A mutual aid-and alliance treaty between United Kingdom and Hesse-Hanau was entered in February 1776.

The treaty stipulated that Hanau would assemble a corps of infantry of 668 men available to Britain. The corps had to be properly officered with the men ready for campaign service; the corps fully furnished with tents and equipment. In addition to the oath of fealty already sworn to the hereditary prince as reigning count of Hesse-Hanau, the officers and men should also swear an oath of allegiance to King George III. Hanau would maintain the number of men in the corps through annual recruitment as necessary. Britain would give the corps the same pay and allowances as enjoyed by British troops and wounded soldiers would be treated in British military hospitals in the same way as British troops.

The Hanau regiment that served in North America as Regiment «Erbprinz » was first raised in 1763 as the "Regular Land-Battalion" with seven companies. In 1765 the corps was renamed the "Hanau Battalion", with a grenadier company added.

In 1766, the ruling Count William became the Chef of the corps, now reduced to six companies. In 1768, the corps was renamed the "Hanau Regiment". In 1776, the regiment was reorganized into the Infanterie-Regiment « Erbprinz » and its first battalion dispatched for service in North America. A second battalion of four companies was formed from the men of the Hanau Regiment left in the homeland. After the end of the American Revolutionary War, the two battalions were merged into one regiment which in 1785 received the name "Hesse-Hanau Grenadier Regiment"; a name that was changed to Leib-Grenadier-Regiment the following year. In 1789 the regiment became the second battalion of the Hesse-Cassel "Guards Grenadier Regiment". This regiment was a predecessor of the Prussian Füsilier-Regiment « von Gersdorff » (Kurhessisches) Nr. 80.

== Organization ==
Staff

- 1 Colonel
- 1 Lieutenant-colonel
- 1 Major
- 1 Auditor (judge-advocate)
- 1 Regimental Quartermaster
- 1 Chaplain
- 1 Surgeon-major
- 3 Surgeons
- 1 Drum-major
- 6 Hautbois
- 1 Provost
- 1 Provost servant

Company of Grenadiers x 1

- 1 Captain
- 1 First Lieutenant
- 2 Second Lieutenants
- 1 Sergeant-Major
- 2 Sergeants
- 1 Fourier (quartermaster-sergeant)
- 1 Capitaine d'Armes (ordnance-sergeant)
- 3 Corporals
- 2 Fifes
- 2 Drummers
- 95 Grenadiers

Regimental Company x 5

- 1 Captain
- 1 First Lieutenant
- 1 Second Lieutenant
- 1 Ensign
- 1 Sergeant-Major
- 2 Sergeants
- 1 Fourier (quartermaster-sergeant)
- 1 Capitaine d'Armes (ordnance-sergeant)
- 1 Bearer of the Colours
- 3 Corporals
- 3 Drummers
- 93 Privates

== Operations ==
The Regiment arrived in Quebec in June 1776 together with the Brunswick troops. Together with the Brunswick Musketeer Regiment Prinz Friedrich it formed the 2nd German Brigade under the command of Colonel Wilhelm Rudolf von Gall, the commanding officer of Erbprinz who was appointed brigadier-general in August by Sir Guy Carleton. It participated in the siege of Ticonderoga, the battle of Bennington, the battle of Freeman's Farm and the battle of Bemis Heights, and surrendered at Saratoga 1777 with the rest of the troops under Burgoyne. In the Convention Army, the Hanau Artillery and Battalion Barner made up the 3rd Division under command of Brigadier von Gall. After prisoner exchanges in 1781, the regiment was reorganized in Quebec. It was then put under the temporary command of Lieutenant-colonel Karl Adolf Christoph von Creutzburg of the Hanau Jägers and Major Georg Pausch of the Hanau Artillery.
