= Grouse Creek (British Columbia) =

Grouse Creek is a creek located in the Cariboo region of British Columbia. The creek was discovered to be gold bearing in 1861. In 1864 the Heron Company staked a claim which yielded over $400,000. Many companies have mined the creek including the full rig, Black Hawk, Canadian, and Heron. The creek was mined heavily in 1860s and 1870s. It was home to the Grouse Creek War.
