= Georg Pausch =

Georg Pausch (about 1740 – 1795 or 1796) was a soldier from Hesse-Hanau. He is noted for the journal he left describing the experiences and those of his company in Canada with Burgoyne's campaign. The campaign culminated in Burgoyne's surrender after the Battle of Saratoga.

== Biography ==
Pausch was chief of the Hesse-Hanau artillery in the Burgoyne campaign. Little is known of him after Burgoyne's surrender. His signature appears on the Cambridge parole, now in the Boston Public Library. In 1786 the name of Georg Pausch is entered in the official calendar of Hesse-Cassel as major in the regiment of light artillery. His name disappears from the calendar in 1796, so that it is probable he died early in that year or late in the year preceding.

== Journal ==
His journal, which was found in the late 19th century in the state library at Cassel, is among the most valuable of the accounts of the German troops in the British service during the American Revolution that have yet been discovered. It gives detailed descriptions of the difficulties that the Hessians experienced in passing through the countries on the lower Rhine and the Netherlands to the seaboard. It details the fate and fortune of Pausch and his men from 15 May 1776, the day they left Hanau, to the close of Burgoyne's last battle, 7 October 1777.

The journal dwells freely on the personal experiences of its author and his men while in Canada, providing glimpses into the private lives of the Hessian soldiers. Pausch's account is the first of the part played by the Hesse-Hanau artillery in the Battle of Saratoga. It supplements the information in the Military Journals of General Riedesel on the actions of the Brunswick infantry in the same battle.

=== Editions ===
The journal has been translated by William L. Stone, with an introduction by Edward J. Lowell (Albany, 1886).
