= Grouse Creek War =

1867 mining conflict of the Cariboo Gold Rush

- Part of the Cariboo Gold Rush
Date	1867
Location	Grouse Creek, Barkerville, British Columbia
Result	The Canadian Company is forced to vacate the lands claimed by the Heron Company along Grouse Creek

Belligerents
Heron Company	Canadian Company

The Grouse Creek War was a mining conflict that took place in 1867 near the gold-rush town of Barkerville in the Cariboo region of British Columbia. The conflict was fought mainly over the mining rights for Grouse Creek, a small stream about 5 kilometers south of Barkerville, where a large amount of gold was discovered in it around 1861. The total value of the gold collected from the creek equated to around $4 million, which is equal to about $256 million in 2024.

== Background ==
The conflict began in 1867, when the Heron Company, a mining group formed by American Robert Heron, laid claim to several large stretches of the creek for his company. Later that year, the Heron Company obtained a franchise and began operations on building a hundred-foot-long flume to collect materials from the creek bed more easily. The operation proved financially successful and brought in large sums of money for the Heron Company while also gaining the attention of several other groups operating in the area.

Weeks after the flume operation began, a smaller mining company based in the area, the Canadian Company, traveled to the place on the creek where the flume was located and set up camp directly on the Heron Company's property. They proceeded to force the Heron Company workers out of the area, then began to collect and sell the gold that the flume brought in for their own financial gain.

The men in the Canadian Company now controlling Heron's flume were met not long after with a group of 25 peace officers, sent to remove the intruders from Heron's property. A force of about 400 armed men, belonging to the Canadian Company, met the constables and pressured them to leave. This forced Heron to contact the provincial government and organize a meeting where the two disputing mining groups could come to a compromise regarding Heron's claims on the creek. Eventually, after some legal quarrels between the two factions, the dispute was settled by the province governor, and the land and gold were returned to the Heron Company.
