= Soldatenhandel =

European fiscal-military system

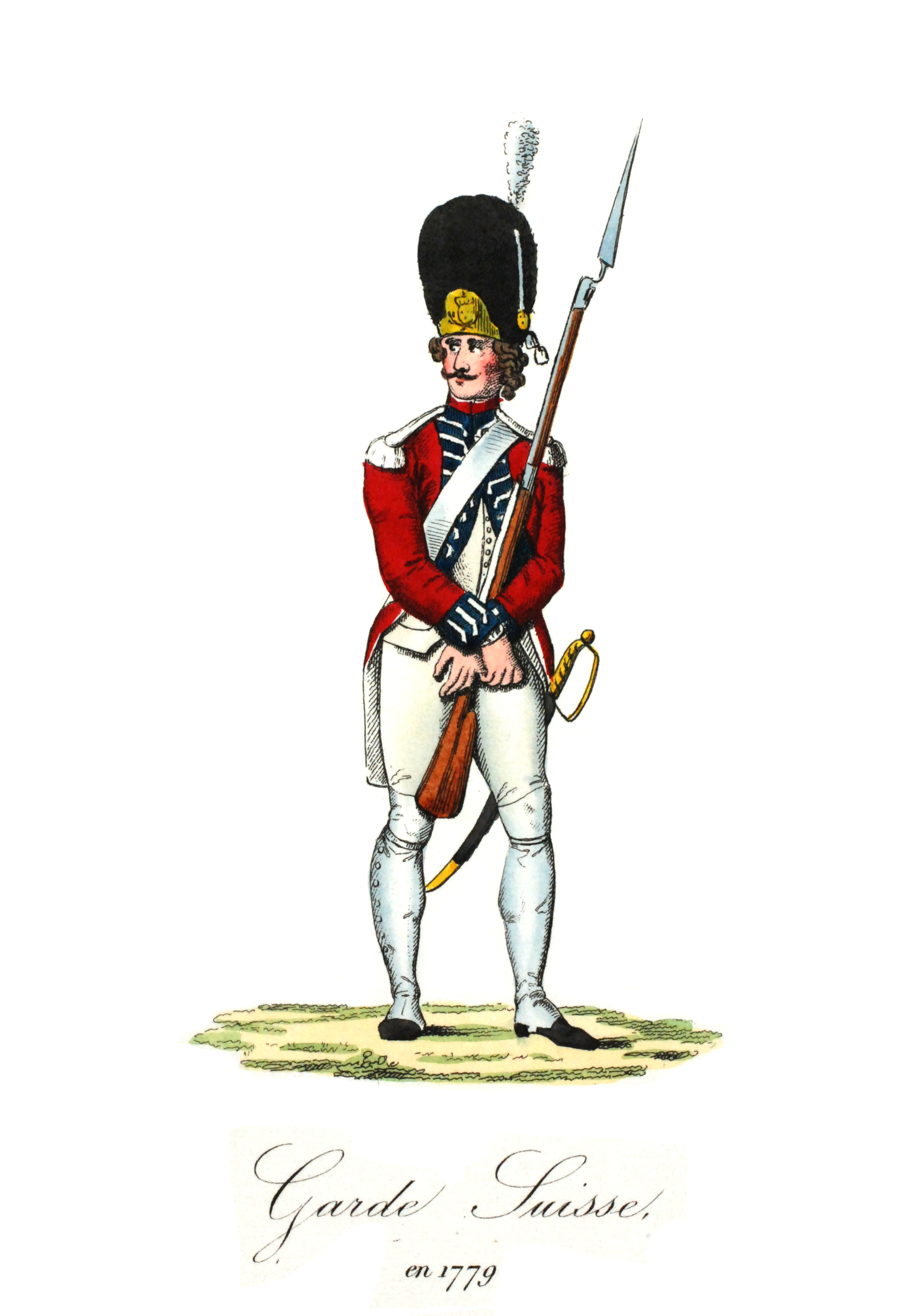
Grenadier of the Swiss Guards in French service, 1779

Soldatenhandel (German: 'soldier trade') was a practice of European states to raise and lease armed forces for compensation, especially in the German states of the Holy Roman Empire. It has been described as "military entrepreneurialism", where fiscal-military states provided "auxiliaries" or "subsidy armies" for wealthier, more powerful states and empires. The term especially refers to the practice following the end of the Thirty Years' War in 1648. The practice fell into disfavor during the 19th century.

== Development ==
The use of auxiliaries dates to the Roman Empire. Auxilia, composed of non-citizens, were provided by provinces. After the collapse of the Western Roman Empire, Western Europe in the Early Middle Ages lacked a unifying imperial power. Although the Carolingian Empire is known to have used both militia levies and auxiliaries, other powers, such as the Eastern Roman Empire, preferred trained mercenary forces to untrained peasants.

Private mercenary groups played a significant military role in Medieval Europe, especially after the Kingdom of Germany was broken up. Mercenary forces provided the needed professional military units, but they could not be controlled by individual states. Even into the early modern period in Europe, warring states commonly hired armed forces as needed. It was estimated, for example, that 70% of France's forces were foreign-born in 1558, during the reign of Henry II of France. It was during that era that Black Bands and Landsknechts were organised as trained military forces that could defend the Holy Roman Empire or also become hired as mercenary forces.

The soldier trade grew during the Thirty Years' War (1618–1648) and the Franco-Spanish War (1635–1659). Ernst von Mansfeld, for example, was paid to defend the Bohemian Rebels. One of the most successful practitioners was Albrecht von Wallenstein, from Bohemia. The Thirty Years' War ended with the Peace of Westphalia, which introduced the principle of Westphalian sovereignty in which each state has exclusive control over its own territory. That was a significant step in the development of Soldatenhandel because smaller states could now raise their own armies and negotiate contracts with larger countries. The princes of the German states could establish mandatory service and offer cheaper prices than private mercenary contractors. That was a benefit to wealthier nations, which found such contracts cheaper than the maintenance of a large standing army. In the late 17th century, for example, France negotiated ready forces in Switzerland and Ireland.

== Practice ==
The practice grew during the 17th and the 18th centuries. The Landgraviate of Hesse-Kassel, for example, leased soldiers to Denmark and Venice, supported William III of Orange in defending the Dutch Republic during his successful invasion of England in 1688, and it joined the Grand Alliance during the Nine Years' War. Hesse-Kassel had forces fighting on both sides of the War of the Austrian Succession. European legal experts such as Emer de Vattel argued that states could provide auxiliary forces to either side of a conflict without violating its neutrality. By the end of the 18th century, British Colonel William Fawcett wrote that it was no longer possible to recruit in Germany except with the permission of a state prince.

The primary motivation of the soldier trade is often viewed as financial. However, keeping an armed force trained and equipped came at a high cost and included financial risks. Fiscal-military states could not always obtain long-term contracts to financially maintain their armies. For instance, Württemberg and Bavaria failed to secure treaties with Great Britain during the American Revolutionary War because they had not been financially able to keep regiments in a state of readiness. Even when contracts were made, though, they rarely resulted in payments that covered all the expenses of a mobilized army and so states would normally lose money on their contracts. Furthermore, terms of payment were not always honoured.

States that did not participate in the soldier trade also faced financial risks, however. Members states that did not provide forces to the Holy Roman Empire could be made to pay a penalty.

Although the soldier trade rarely generated a profit, the use of armed forces was a key factor in establishing diplomatic ties. Smaller states established strong ties with imperial partners through the alliances established in their Soldatenhandel contracts. One illustration of this is 18th century Royal Deux-Ponts Regiment, which Palatine Zweibrücken maintained for the service of France, a powerful neighbour. States could also negotiate for diplomatic terms instead of money. Frederick I of Prussia, for example, earned the title of "King in Prussia" by a contract alliance with Leopold I, Holy Roman Emperor.

Great Britain, which fought the English Civil War near the end of the Thirty Years' War, did not keep a large standing army. Instead, it came to rely on the Soldatenhandel in the 18th century. Prime Minister Sir Robert Walpole paid Hesse-Kassel an annual fee to keep its army ready to be called up. William Pitt would later criticize that arrangement, but was forced to pay for the use of Soldatenhandel during the Seven Years' War. The numerous contracts that it funded throughout Europe during the era made Britain become known as the guarantor of the balance of powers. It again relied on Soldatenhandel during the American Revolutionary War by compensating six German states to fight in North America.

Lauzun's Legion which fought with the French Army during the American Revolution War were Soldatenhandel.

== Recruitment ==
Peter H. Wilson describes four broad categories of recruitment during the era:

1. Direct recruitment involved the enlistment of men who resided in another jurisdiction to join an existing military unit.
2. Foreign regiments recruited men to form newly established military units, either directly or through intermediaries.
3. Hired auxiliaries were whole military units provided by a foreign provider until the contract expired or until they were recalled by the foreign power. Auxiliary units could be fully dependent on the acquiring nation they served, or they could be subsidized and remain at least partially dependent on their own state.
4. Subsidy troops were partially funded by a state's ally but remained under control of their own state.

Most individual soldiers were recruited by their own state through conscription, mandatory service. When recruits volunteered, that was often contracted to pay off family debts.

== Decline ==
Criticism of Soldatenhandel grew during the late 18th century. Playwrights such as Friedrich Schiller and Johann Krauseneck authored works with tragic characters forced to fight in the Americas. Johann Gottfried Seume wrote a fictionalised version of his voluntary enlistment in which Hessian officers captured him and sent him to Canada. The soldier trade had also become less profitable for the states supplying the military units. Karl, Prince of Brunswick-Wolfenbüttel, was almost ruined by his support of the British during the American Revolution. That may have influenced his new opinion that freeborn citizens could not be forced to take up arms except "to defend the fatherland".

The Napoleonic Wars saw the peak use of Soldatenhandel, but also saw its demise. Revolutionary ideas regarding nationalism and citizenship made it increasingly unpopular for rulers to send soldiers beyond their borders. In addition, as smaller states merged into the great powers of the late 19th century, the need for foreign auxiliary forces became less necessary. Increased mechanization during the Industrial Revolution made it easier to recruit within a nation's borders. Spain, Portugal, Naples, and the Papal States (and later Vatican City) were the last states to recruit significant numbers of foreign soldiers.

German historians in the 19th century were critical of Soldatenhandel and argued that the individual states' foreign alliances slowed the unification of the German nation. The practice was not widely studied and was often misunderstood by later historians. The United States, in particular, remains influenced by revolutionary-era descriptions of Hessian auxiliaries as "foreign Mercenaries" and "barbarous strangers". Recent scholarship suggests that Soldatenhandel was a necessary practice in early modern Europe for the small states providing military forces as well as for the larger kingdoms that were frequently drawn into wars.
