= Creuzbourg's Jäger Corps =

German battalion assisting the British in the American Revolutionary War

Jäger-Corps von Creuzbourg
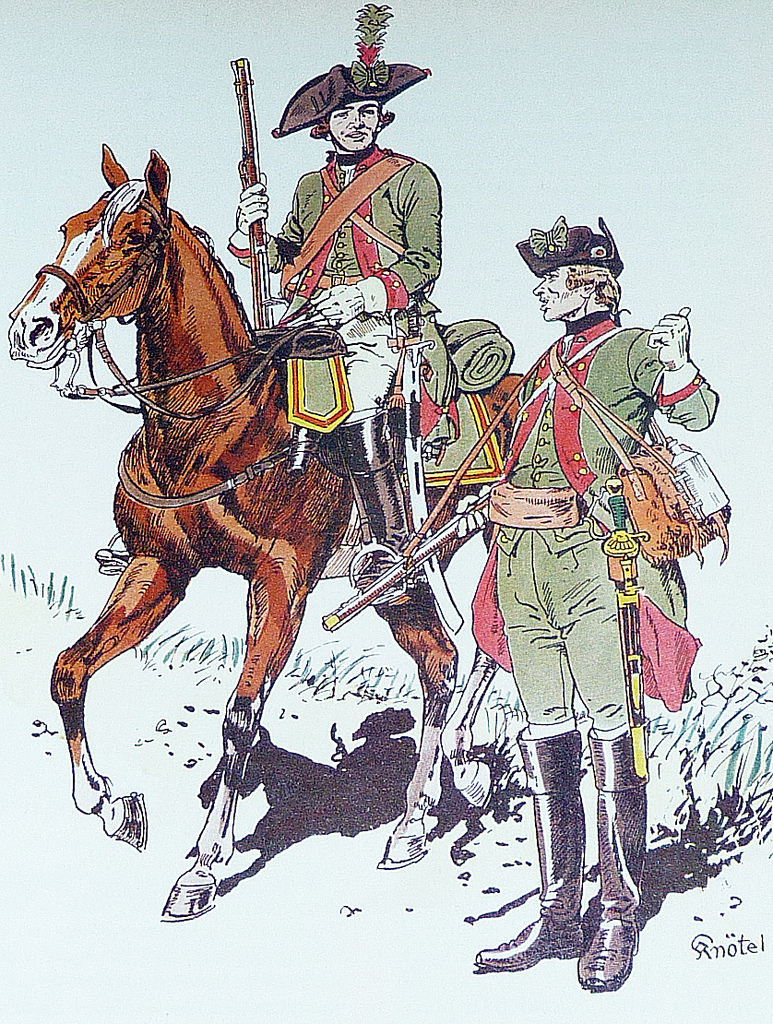
- Cavalryman and infantry of the corps
- Active: 1777-1783
- Country: Hesse-Hanau
- Allegiance: The British Crown
- Branch: Crown Forces; German allied contingent
- Type: Infantry
- Role: Jägers
- Size: Four companies
- Engagements: Siege of Fort Ticonderoga; Siege of Fort Stanwix; Battle of Oriskany

Commanders
- Notable commanders: Karl Adolf Christoph von Creutzburg

Creuzbourg's Jäger Corps (Jäger-Corps von Creuzbourg) was an independent Jäger battalion raised by the county of Hesse-Hanau and put to the disposition of the British Crown, as part of the German Allied contingent during the American Revolutionary War. The corps fought at the Battle of Oriskany, although mostly serving as garrison of different Canadian posts.

== Formation ==
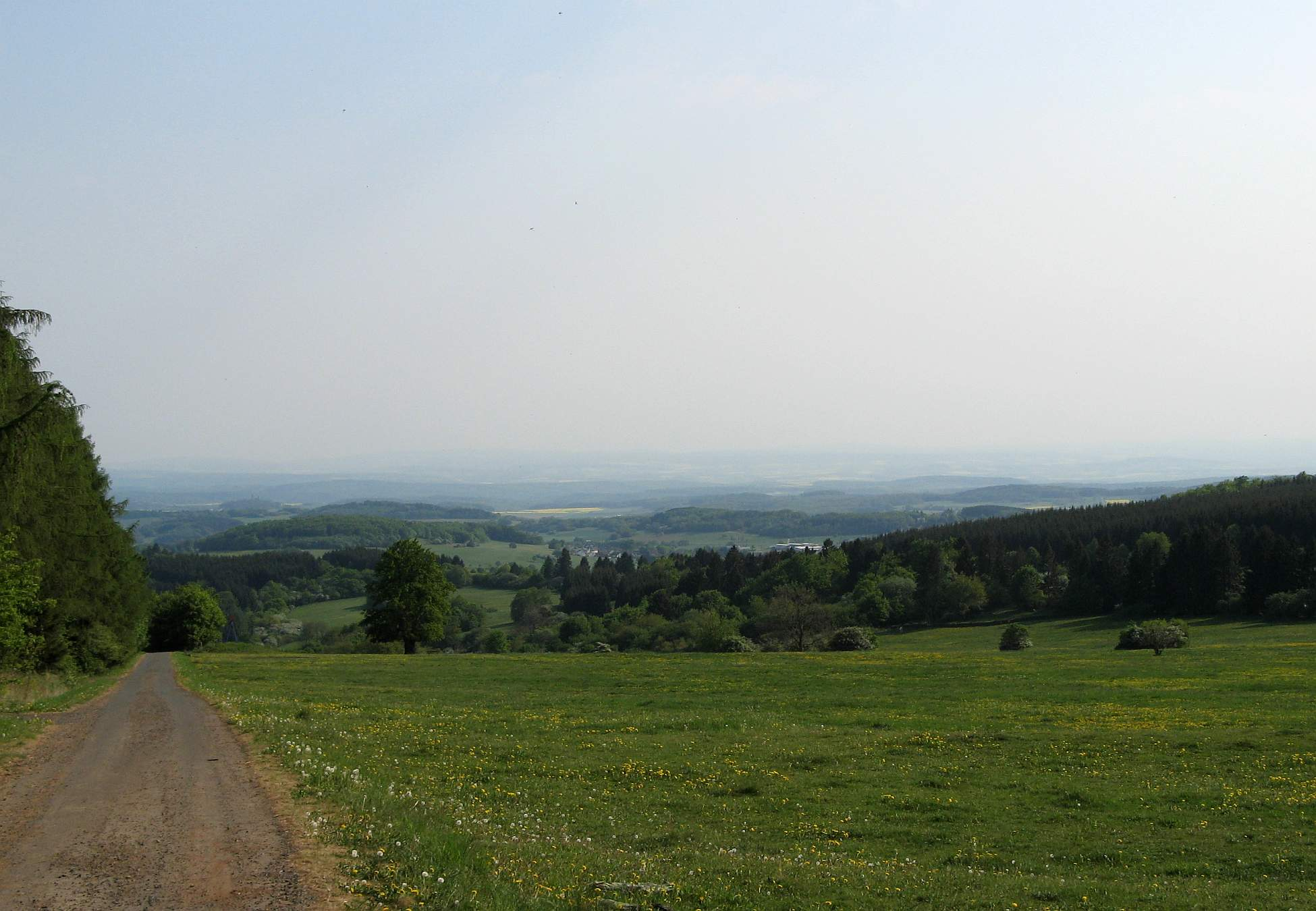
The open Hessian landscape contrasted starkly with the deep forests and the rapid rivers that the Hessian jägers would meet in North America.

When the American Revolutionary War began, the British Army was too small to overwhelm the rebellious colonies with armed might. Subsequently, Britain entered treaties with a number of German principalities, which provided the British Crown with allied contingents for service in North America in return for monetary subsidies. A mutual aid- and alliance treaty between United Kingdom and Hesse-Hanau was entered in February 1776.

A Jäger corps under the command of Lieutenant Colonel Karl Adolf Christoph von Creutzburg was among the units in the Hesse-Hanau contingent. The Jägers were recruited from state foresters and other professional hunters. They were selected for their marksmanship, and were all volunteers, in contrast with the drafted or pressed soldiers that filled the ranks of the Hesse-Hanau infantry. The pay was higher than for ordinary troops. The British government especially requested Jägers for the American campaign, as they were perceived as better able to endure the North American wilderness.

== Operations ==
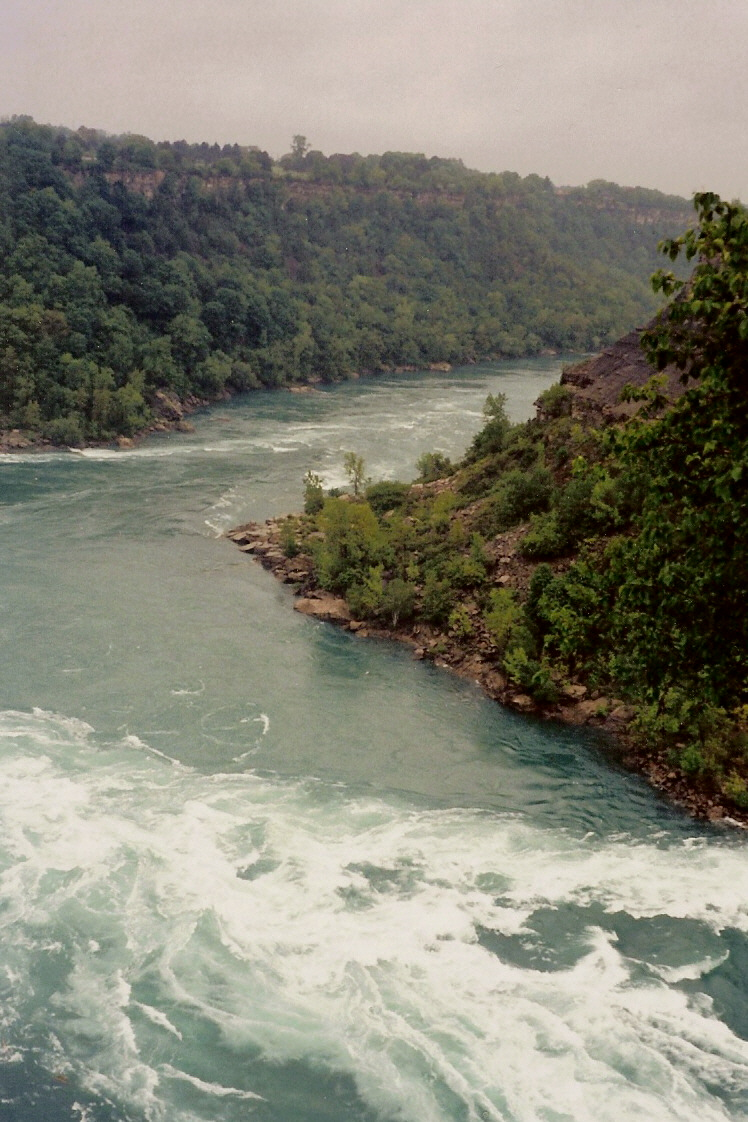
During almost all its movements Creuzbourg's Jäger Corps used the waterways.

The Hesse-Hanau contingent arrived to Canada in the spring of 1777 and became part of General Burgoyne's army that after the Battle of Saratoga became American prisoners of war. Creuzbourg's Jäger Corps, however, escaped defeat and imprisonment, as it was to be a part of Barry St. Leger's western offensive during the Saratoga Campaign. Due to the slow pace of wilderness travel, only one of the Corp's companies arrived in time to participate in this campaign. This single company made a rather significant contribution to the American defeat at the Battle of Oriskany. The remaining companies did not join St. Leger until after the Siege of Fort Stanwix had ended and the Crown forces were retreating northward.

During the winter of 1777-1778, Creuzbourg's Jäger Corps was quartered in the area southeast of Montreal. In August 1778 at least one company was based around Terrebonne. The winter of 1779-1780 was spent in cantonment at La Prairie. During the summer of 1781, the corps formed the Québec garrison situated across the St-Lawrence at Pointe-de-Lévis.

The winter of 1781-1782 spent in quarters in Saint-Vallier and Châteauguay; during the summer of 1782 the corps was posted to Île aux Noix and Lacolle, in the Montérégie region.

== Disbandment ==
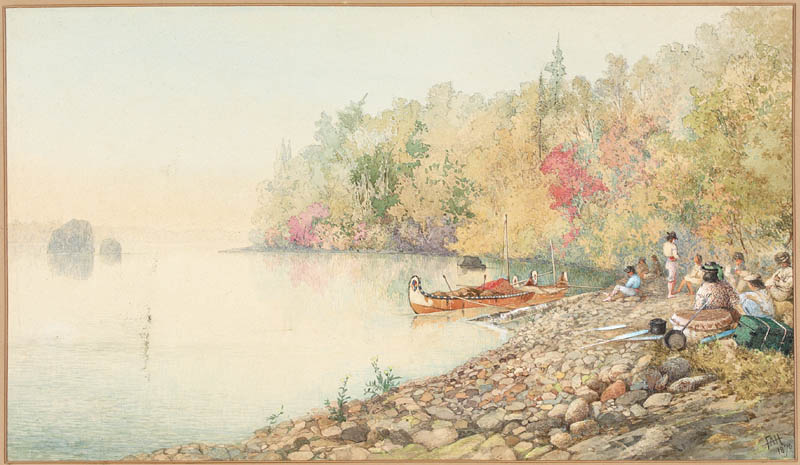
The free life of Canada was appealing for many members of Creuzbourg's Jäger Corps.

The Treaty of Paris 1783 saw the Hesse-Hanau contingent repatriated, with almost half of Creuzbourg's Jäger Corps opting to resign and settle in North America. Their combat experience had been limited, but their long marches taught them the ways of the wilderness as they hunted, fished and snowshoed. Overall, they enjoyed a freedom not felt in Germany.

== Organization ==
Four companies of 100 officers and men each.

=== Commanding officer and officers commanding companies ===
- Creutzburg, Carl Adolf Christoph von, Lieutenant Colonel, commanding officer.
- Franken, Hermann Albrecht von, Major.
- Castendyck, Wilhelm, Captain.
- Hildebrand, Jacob, Captain.
- Hugget, Sigismund, Captain.
- Wittgenstein, Count L. K. von, Captain.

=== Middle Staff ===
- Bender, Xaverius, Regimental Surgeon.
- Kaup, Johann Jakob, Judge Advocate.
- Staudinger, Ernst Friedrich, Quartermaster.
- Velden, Wilhelm von den, Adjutant.
- Armorers, 2
- Armorer's assistant
- Wagoner for the war chest
- Wagoners for the company wagons, 4
- Provost

=== Company ===
- Captain
- First lieutenant
- Second lieutenant
- Sergeant-major
- Sergeant
- Quartermaster-sergeant
- Captain of arms
- Corporals, 6
- Surgeon's mate
- Buglers, 3
- Chasseurs, 78
- Officer's servants, 3

The colonel's company had one officer and one servant more, and two chasseurs less.
