= Hesse-Hanau =

Territory in the Holy Roman Empire

County of Hesse-Hanau Grafschaft Hessen-Hanau (German)
- 1760–1821
- Coat of arms
- Capital: Hanau
- Government: Absolute monarchy
- History
  - Established: 1760
  - Disestablished: 1821
Preceded by	Succeeded by
Landgraviate of Hesse-Kassel	Grand Duchy of Frankfurt; Electorate of Hesse

Hesse-Hanau (German: Hessen-Hanau) was a territory in the Holy Roman Empire. It emerged when the former county of Hanau-Münzenberg became a secundogeniture of Hesse-Kassel in 1760. When the reigning count, William IX, also became landgrave of Hesse-Cassel in 1785, the two governments began to merge, although the process was delayed first by French occupation, and later by incorporation into the French satellite duchy of Frankfurt. The incorporation of Hesse-Hanau with Hesse-Cassel was not completed until 1821.

== Secundogeniture ==
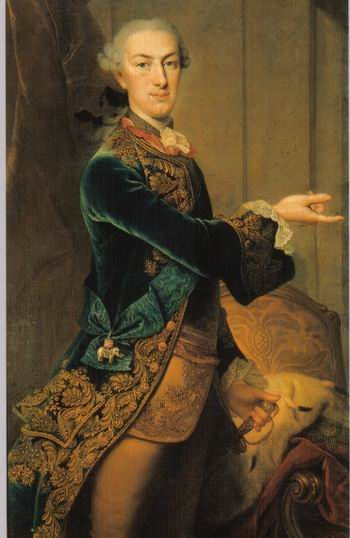
William, Hereditary Prince of Hesse-Cassel and Count of Hesse-Hanau.

When the hereditary prince of Hesse-Cassel, the later Frederick II, converted to Roman Catholicism, his father, the reigning landgrave William VIII decided to do what he could to limit his son's future realm. He therefore made the county of Hanau-Münzenberg, incorporated with Hesse-Cassel in 1736, a secundogeniture of Hesse-Cassel, transferring it to the oldest son of Frederic, the hereditary count William.

== Sovereignty ==
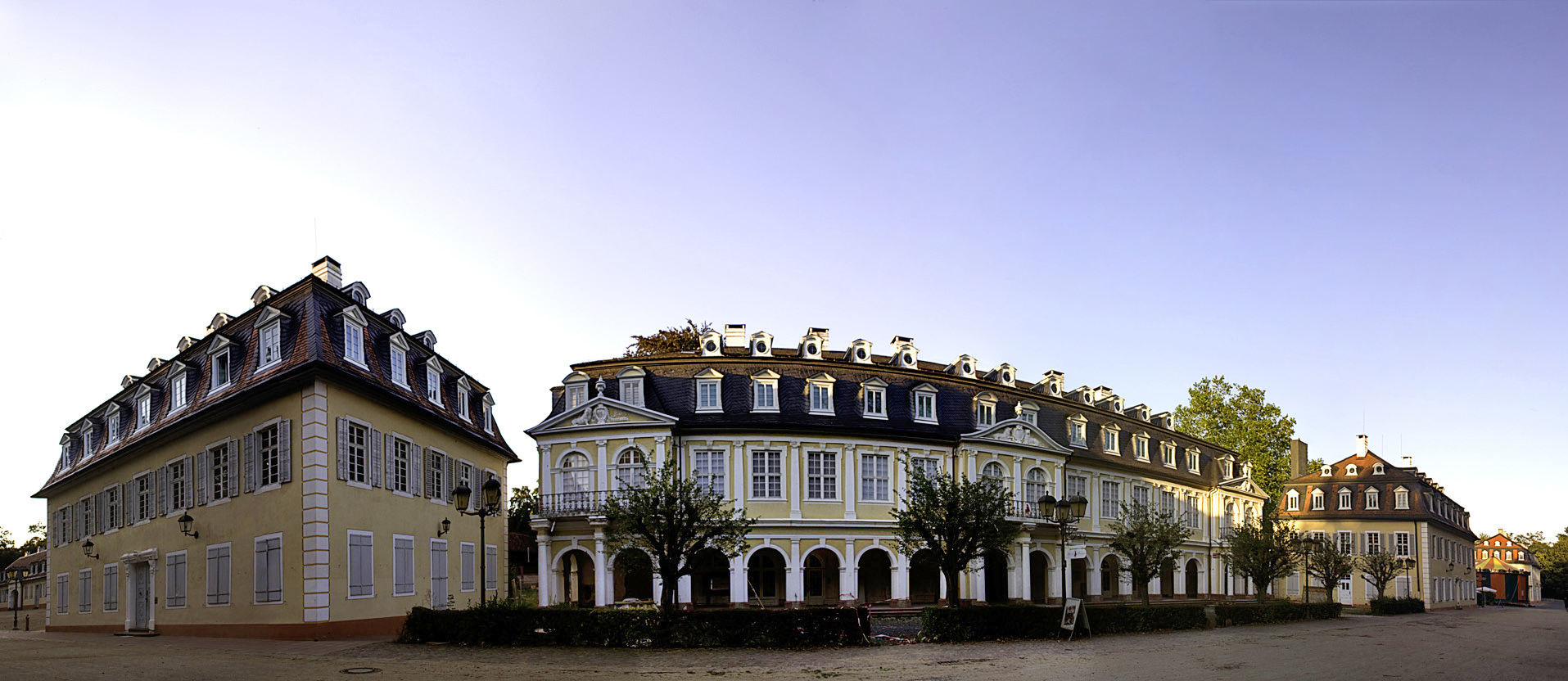
Wilhelmsbad was built during the short sovereignty of Hesse-Hanau.

As count William was underage, his mother the landgravine, princess Mary of Great Britain, ruled as his legal guardian. After his access to the throne of Hesse-Cassel in 1760, landgrave Frederick II repeatedly tried to reunite Hesse-Hanau with Hesse-Cassel, but his efforts failed due to the resistance of Great Britain and the Protestant estates. As further protection, troops from Hanover were garrisoned in Hanau. When William came of age in 1764 he took over the government of the county. At the death of Frederick II in 1785, William became landgrave of Hesse-Cassel. The government of Hesse-Hanau remained in general separate from Hesse-Cassel. Cabinet and war office were, however, merged with those in Hesse-Cassel, and the court of appeal of Cassel got jurisdiction over Hanau in 1792. Until then Hesse-Hanau was ruled as an independent state, undergoing extensive modernizations with the erection of significant buildings in the capital of Hanau. Means for this came from the subsidies the reigning count received from his uncle, king George III of Great Britain. In return, Hesse-Hanau made available a contingent of 2,400 soldiers for the use of the British Crown in the American Revolutionary War.

== Hesse-Hanau Contingent ==
The Hesse-Hanau contingent in the American Revolutionary War, contained the following units:

- Hessen-Hanauisches Regiment Erbprinz 1776
- Hessen-Hanauisches Jägerkorps Creutzburg 1777
- Hessen-Hanauische Artillerie-Kompanie Pausch 1777
- Hessen-Hanauisches Freikorps Janecke 1781

== Napoleonic Wars ==
Hesse-Cassel became an electorate in 1803, while Hesse-Hanau became the principality of Hanau. However, in 1806 the Holy Roman Empire was dissolved and Hesse-Cassel was incorporated into the French satellite Kingdom of Westphalia. Hanau came under French military occupation, then in 1810 was incorporated into the Grand Duchy of Frankfurt, another French satellite. It was not until after the German War of Liberation in 1813 that the sovereignty of Hesse-Cassel was restored. The incorporation of Hanau into Hesse-Cassel was, however, not completed until the death of prince-elector William in 1821, and the administrative reforms under his successor William II, when the county became the Landkreis of Hanau.
