= L. R. Burleigh =

American artist and lithographer

Lucien Rinaldo Burleigh Jr. (1853–1923), whose work was often signed L. R. Burleigh, was an artist and lithographer in Troy, New York who drew and published panoramic maps. His business has been identified as Burleigh Lithograph Company or Burleigh Lithograph Establishment.

== Life and career ==
Burleigh was born in Plainfield, Connecticut. His grandfather was the principal at Plainfield Academy in Connecticut. Burleigh graduated from Worcester County Free Institute of Industrial Science.

An 1883 Troy city directory listed Burleigh as a civil engineer. By 1886, he had become a lithographer and view publisher, publishing under the name Burleigh Lithographing Company. [...] Burleigh published panoramic maps as late as 1892, but his most productive years were from 1885 to 1890.

Burleigh's drawings published as lithographs and include the name of each locality in an artistically stylized font as well, as a listing of local landmarks. The designs were copyrighted. Some of the lithographs he published from earlier than 1886 and later than 1889 indicate they were published by Burleigh and copyrighted by his business, but drawn by someone else.

Burleigh produced views of approximately 280 locations, of which 120 have been established as his, while the remainder is by other artists.

At least one of his lithographs is in the Smithsonian American Art Museum collection. The Boston Public Library and Library of Congress also have numerous examples of his lithographs in their collections. According to the Library of Congress:

The Library of Congress has 163 Burleigh panoramic city plans. State and local archives in New York may contain even more of Burleigh's views. Views were published under his personal name and under the imprint Burleigh Lithographing Company or Burleigh Lithographing Establishment.

J Lyth was an engraver who worked for Burleigh before Burleigh drew and published his own perspective maps of small towns in New York, Massachusetts and other areas in the northeastern United States.

== Gallery ==
Binghamton, New York 1882 signed J Lyth bottom left and Burleigh bottom right (torn)

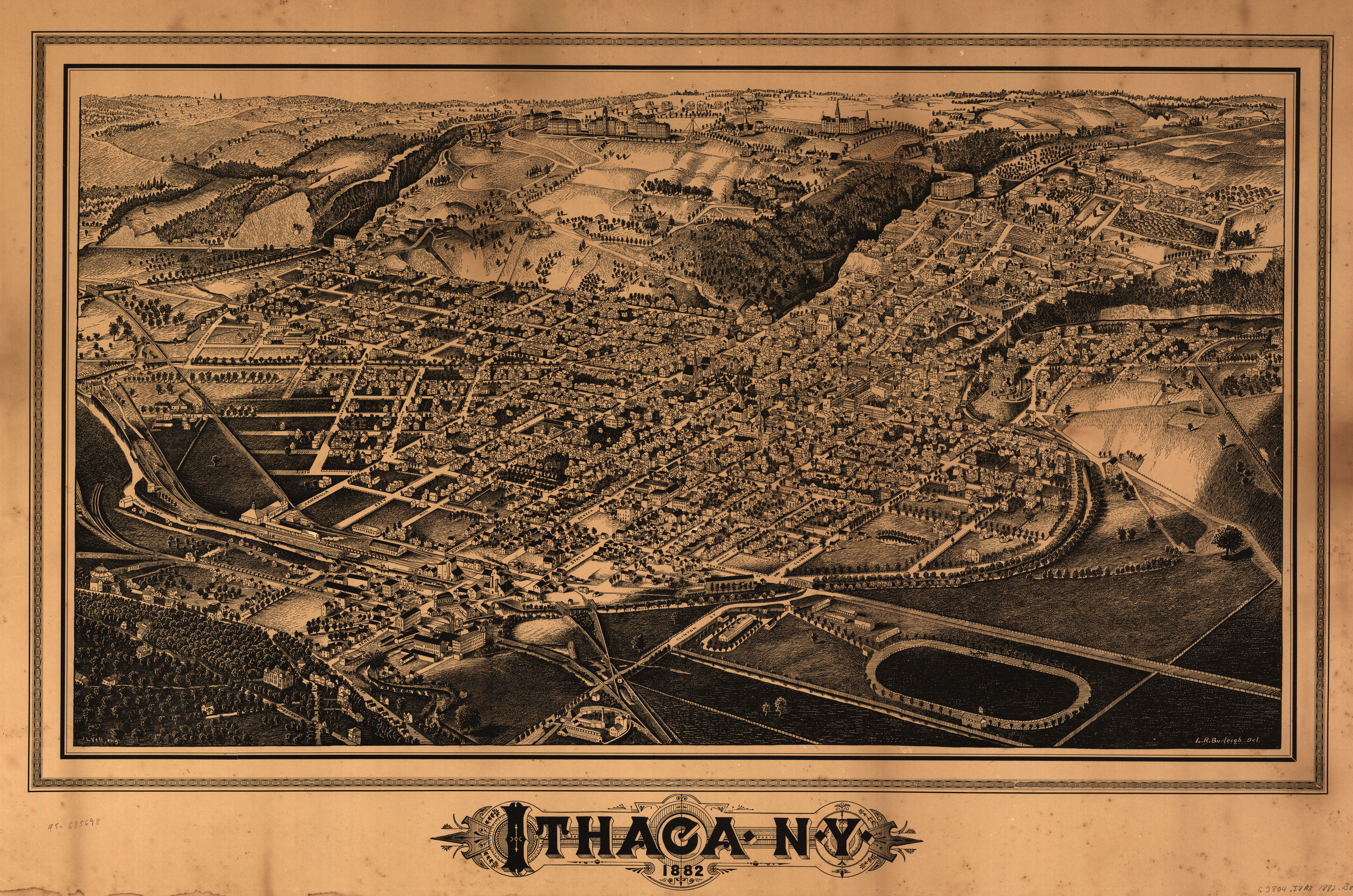
Ithaca, New York, 1882 J Lyth eng bottom left and L.R. Burleigh Del. Bottom right

Woburn, Massachusetts, 1883, has two signatures, L.R. Bureleigh Del. In bottom middle and J Lyth Eng bottom right

Schenectady, New York signed Lyth ? At bottom left.and Burleigh Del bottom right
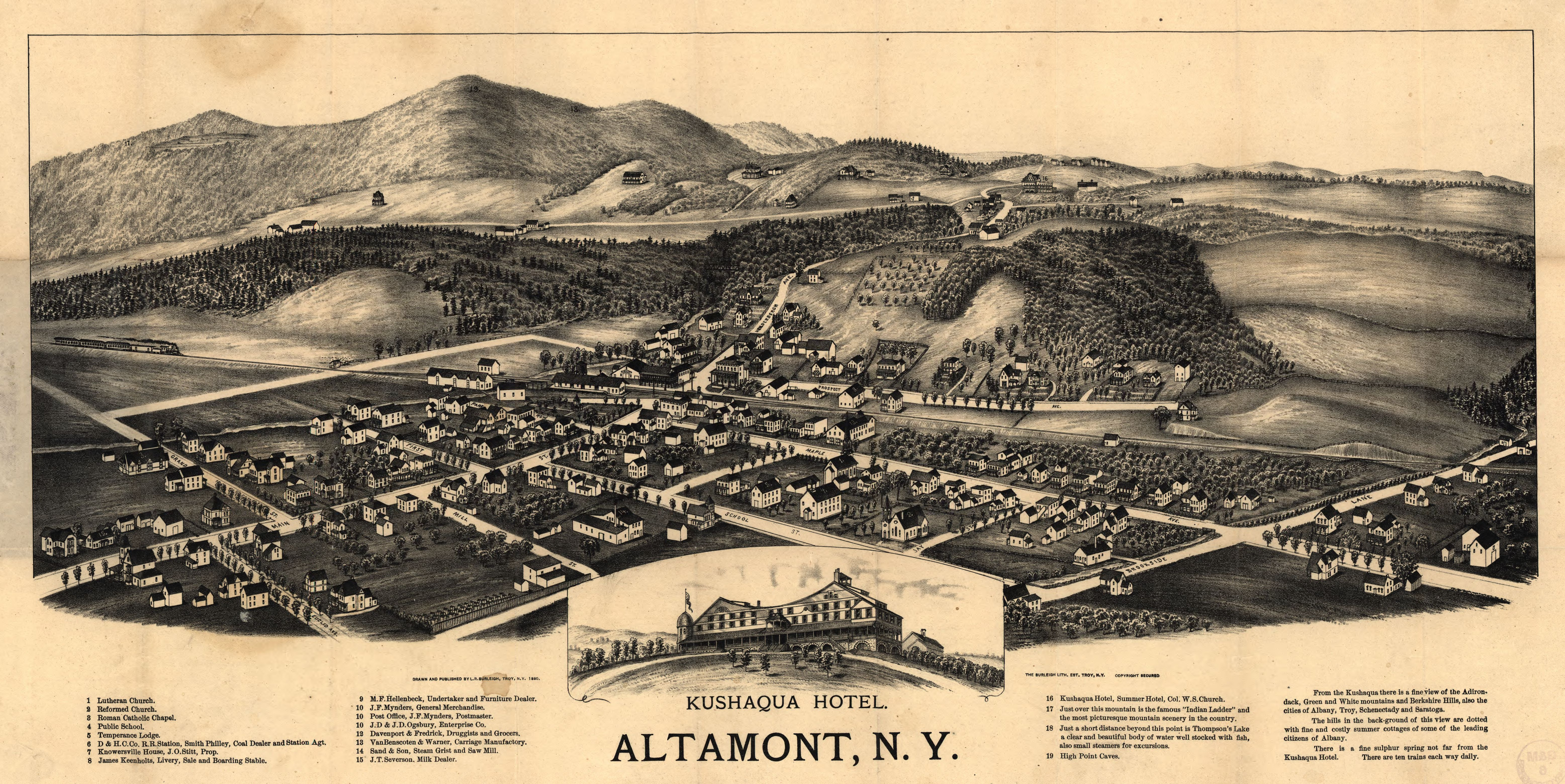
Altamont, New York

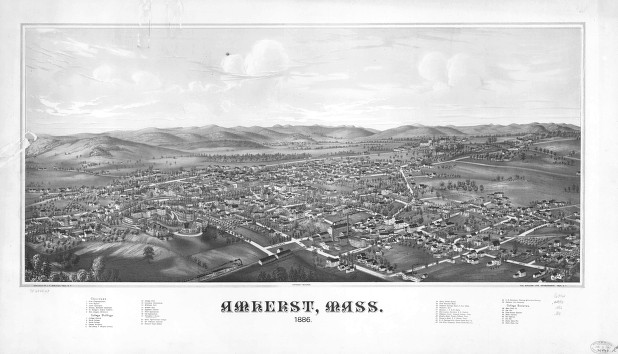
Amherst, Massachusetts

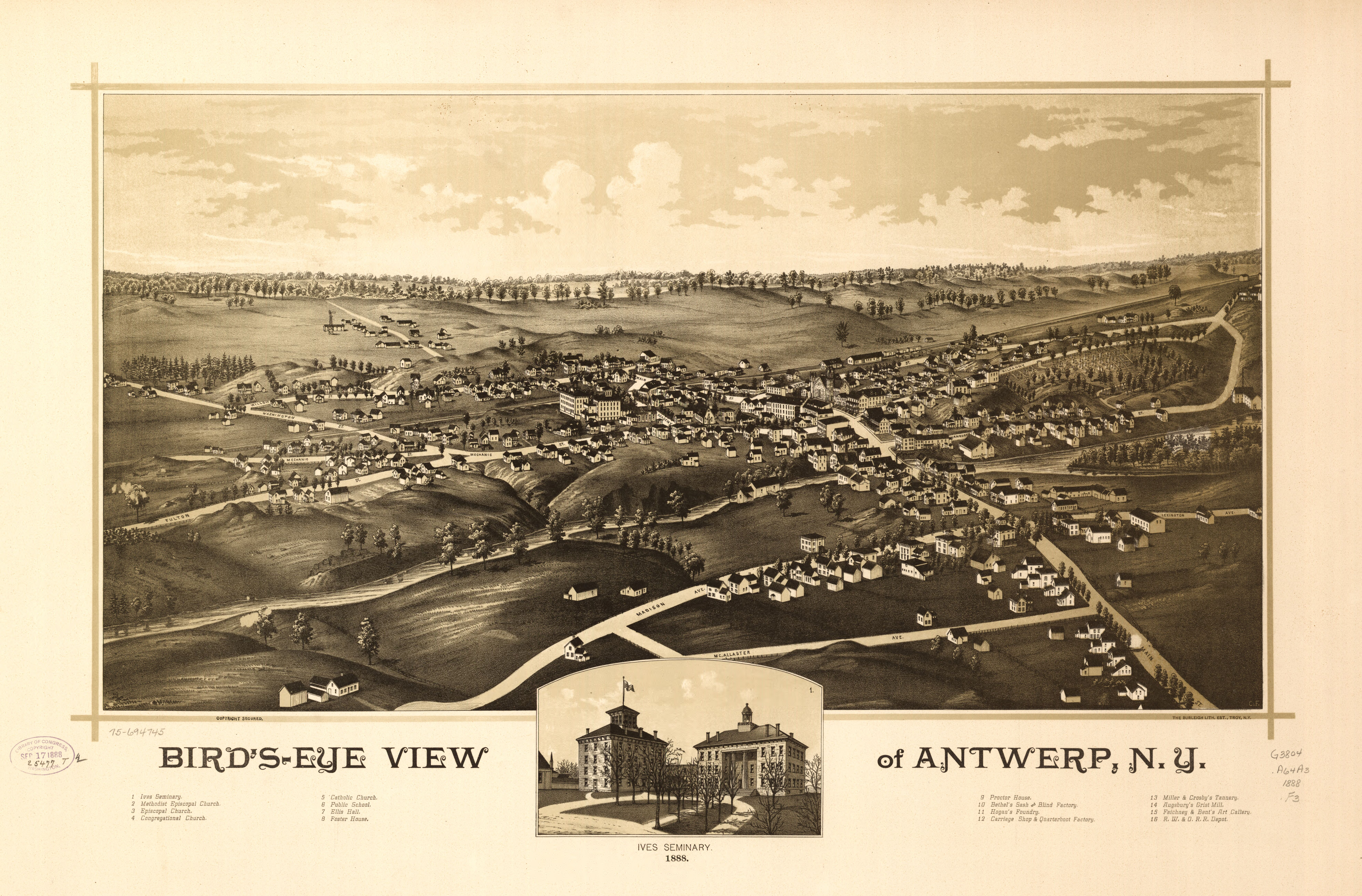
Antwerp, New York

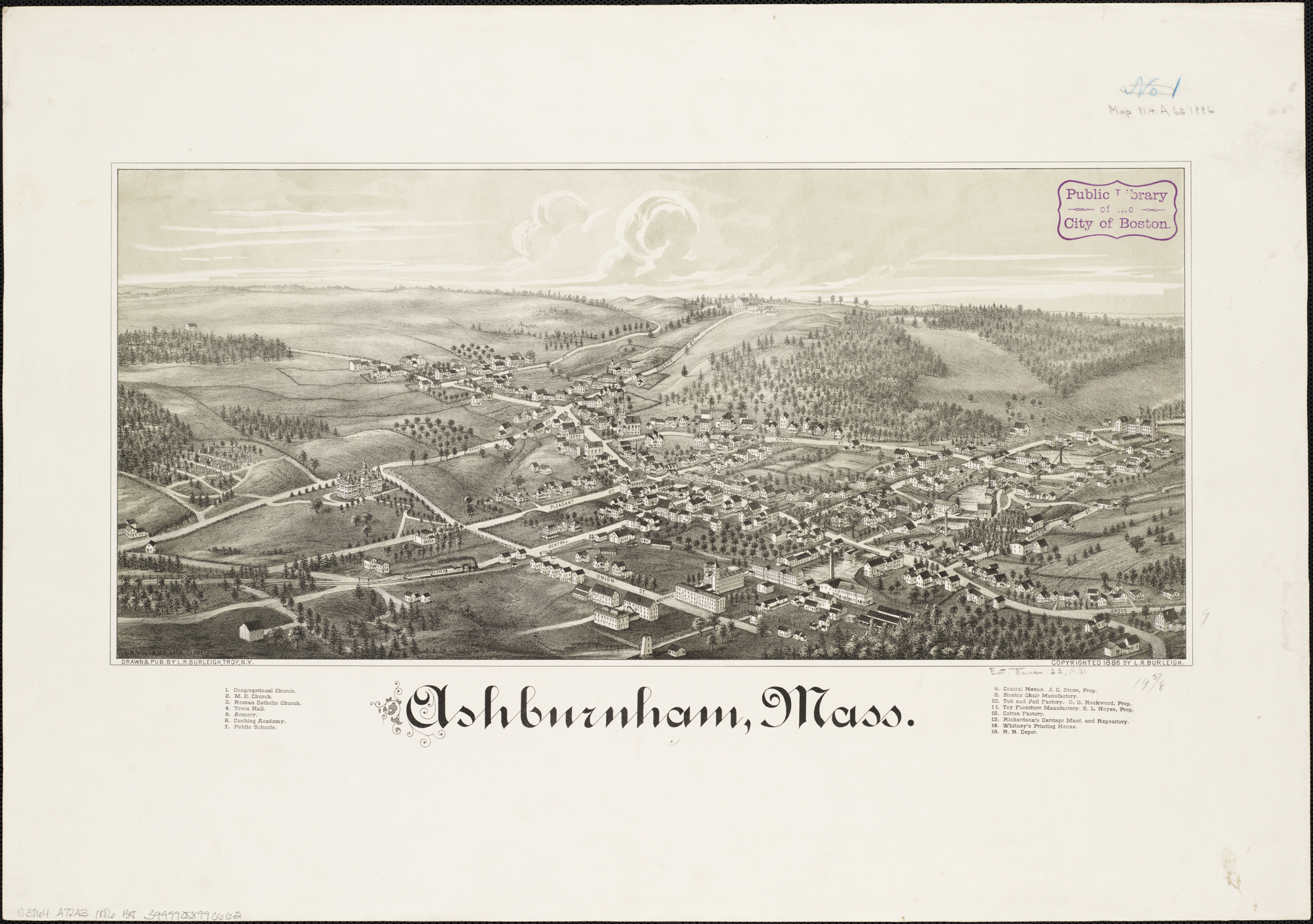
Ashburnham, Massachusetts

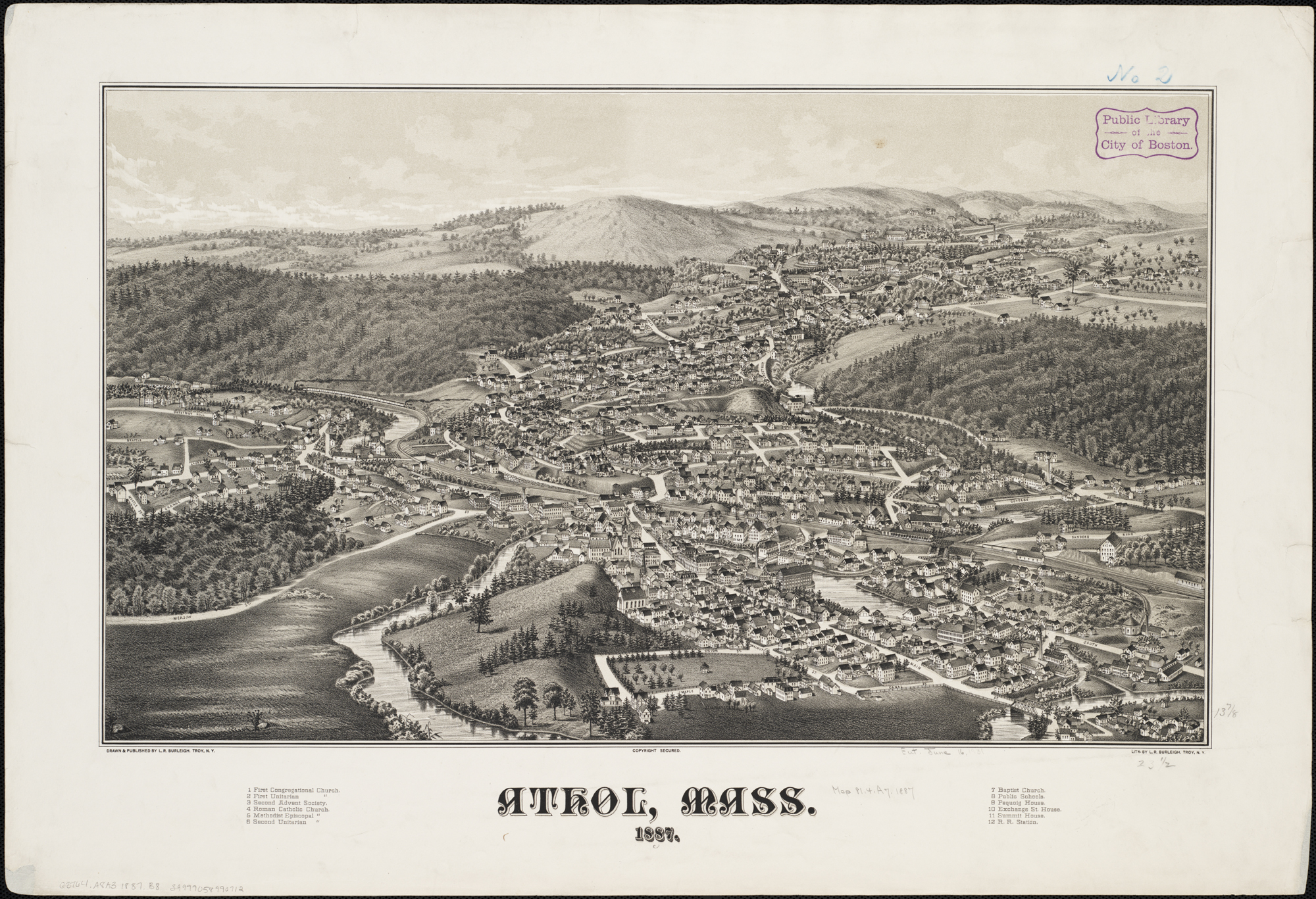
Athol, Massachusetts

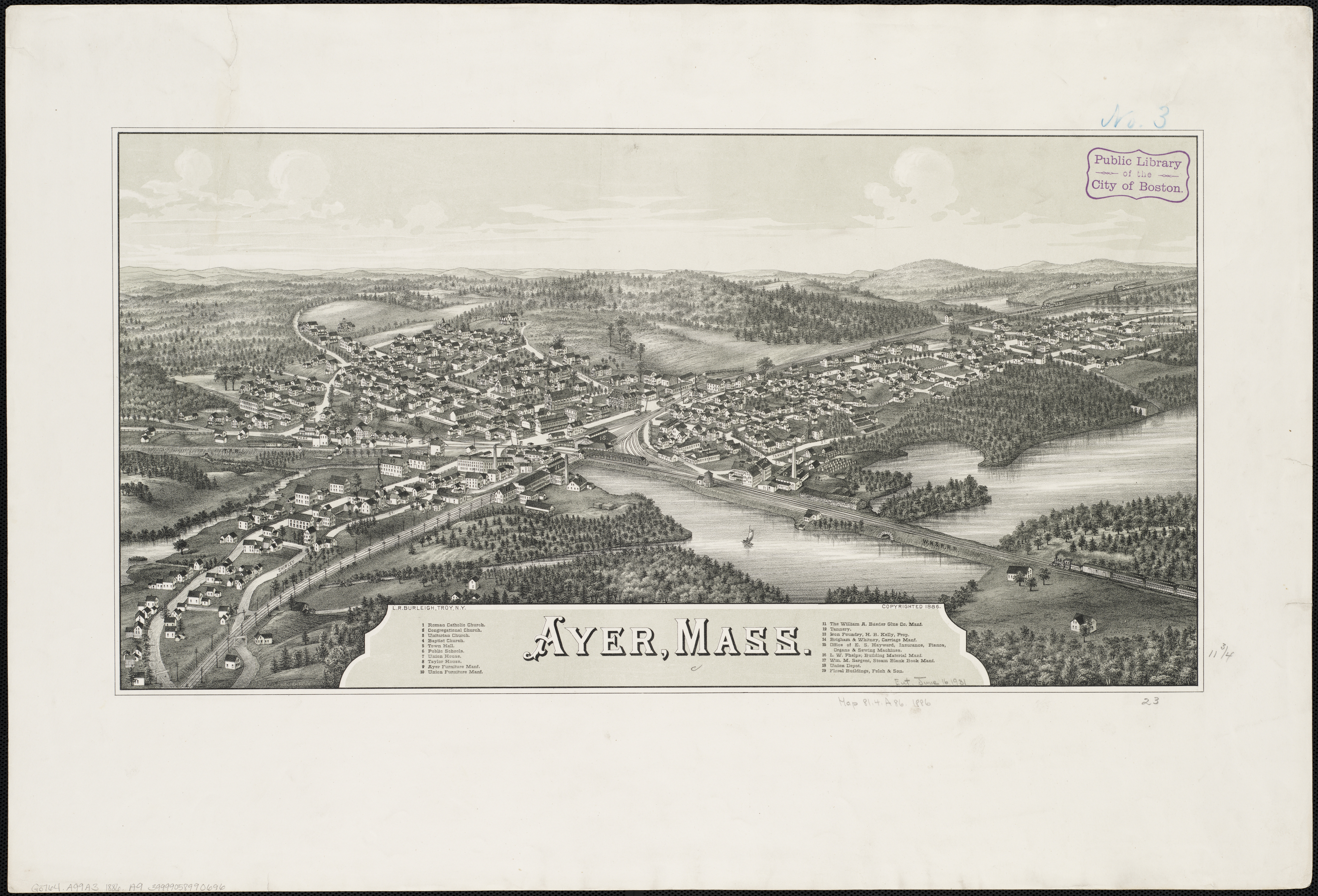
Ayer, Massachusetts

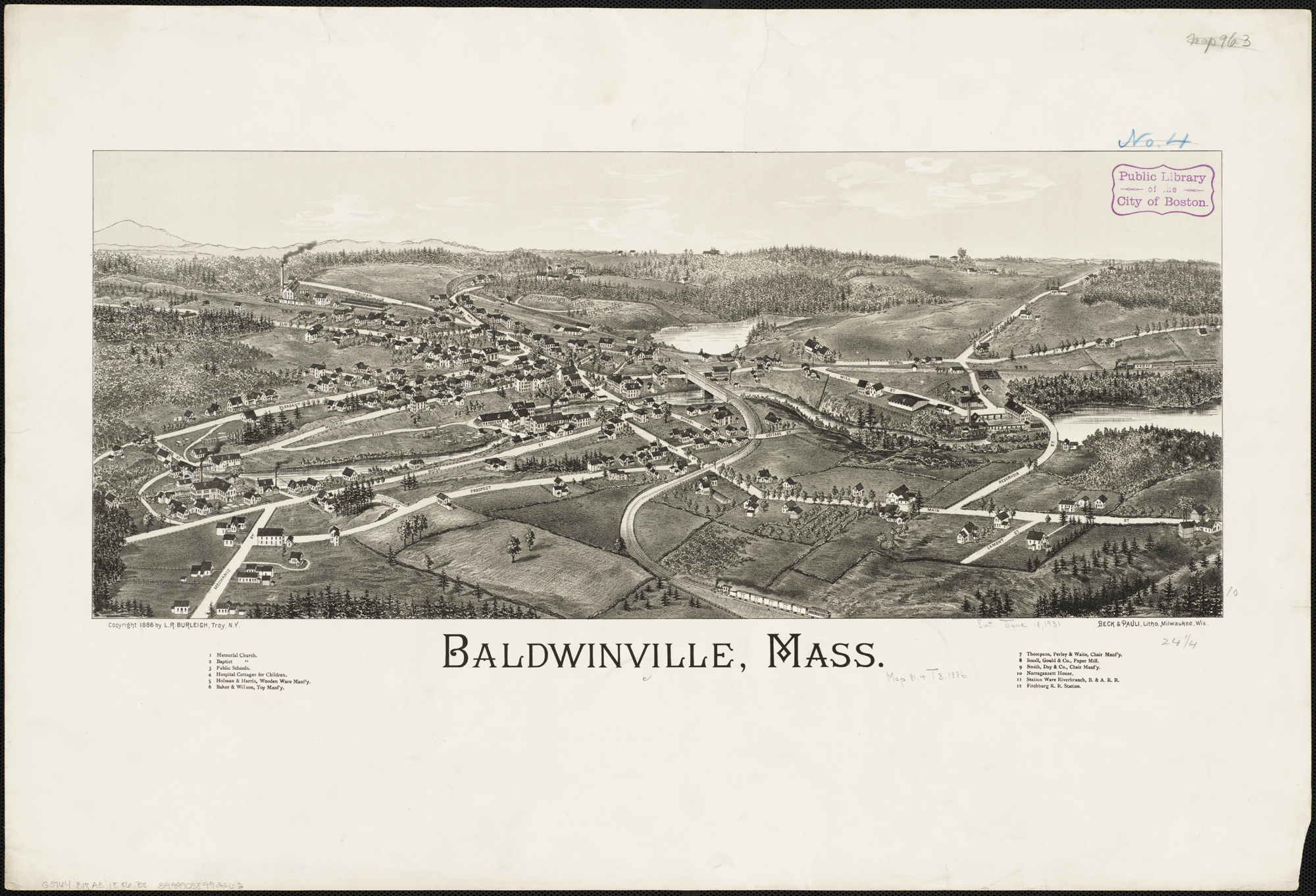
Baldwinville, Massachusetts

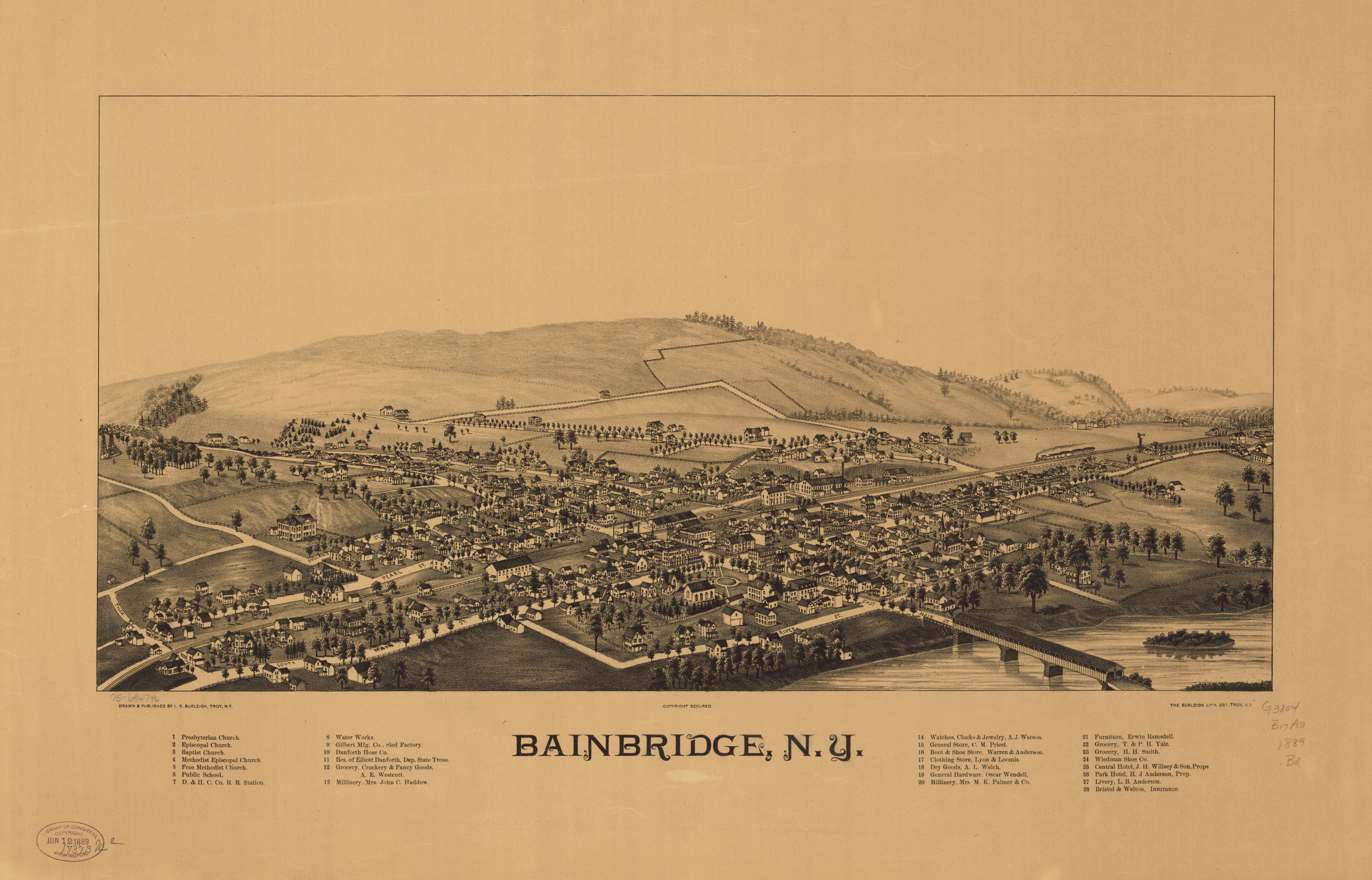
Bainbridge, New York

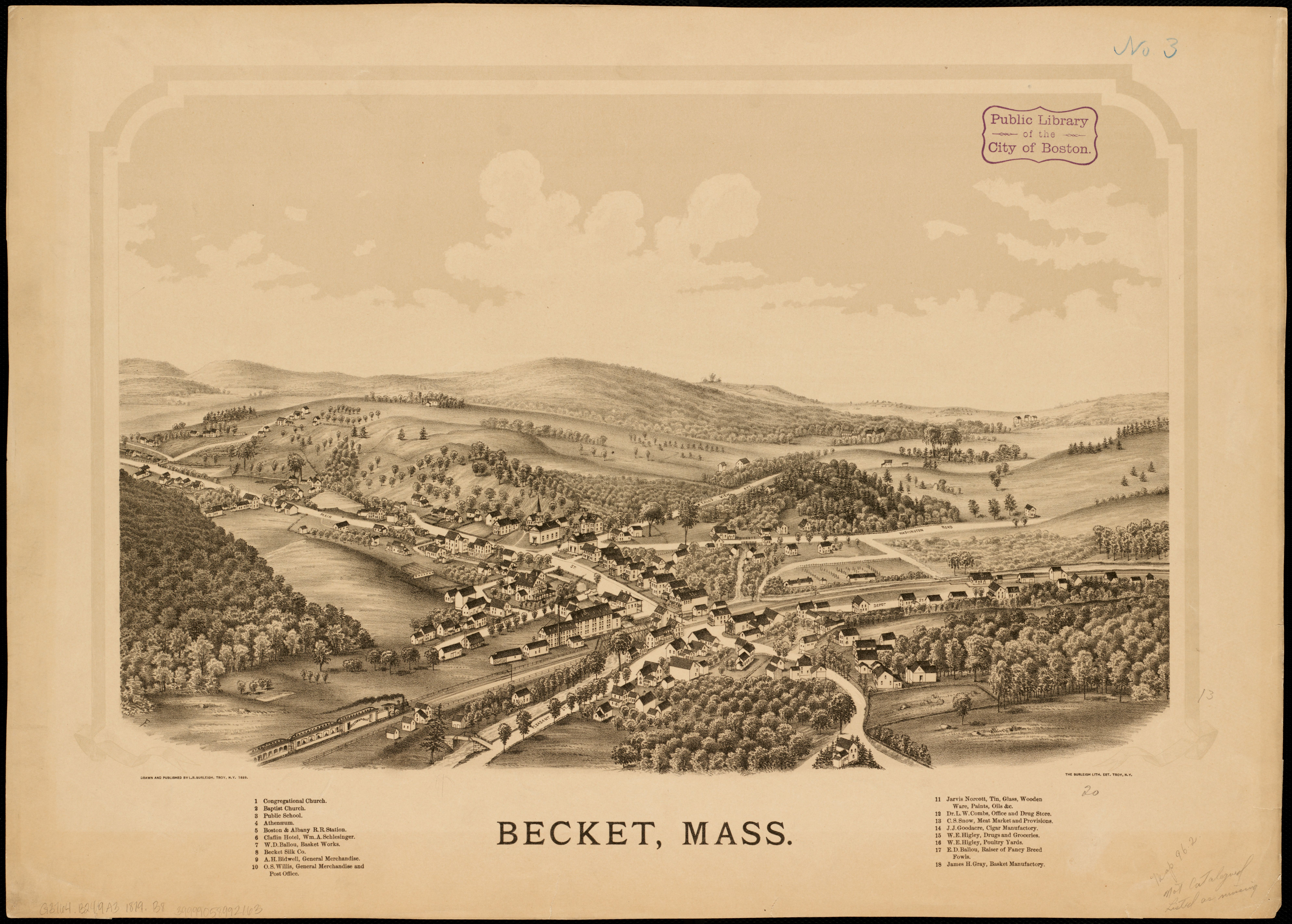
Beckett, Massachusetts

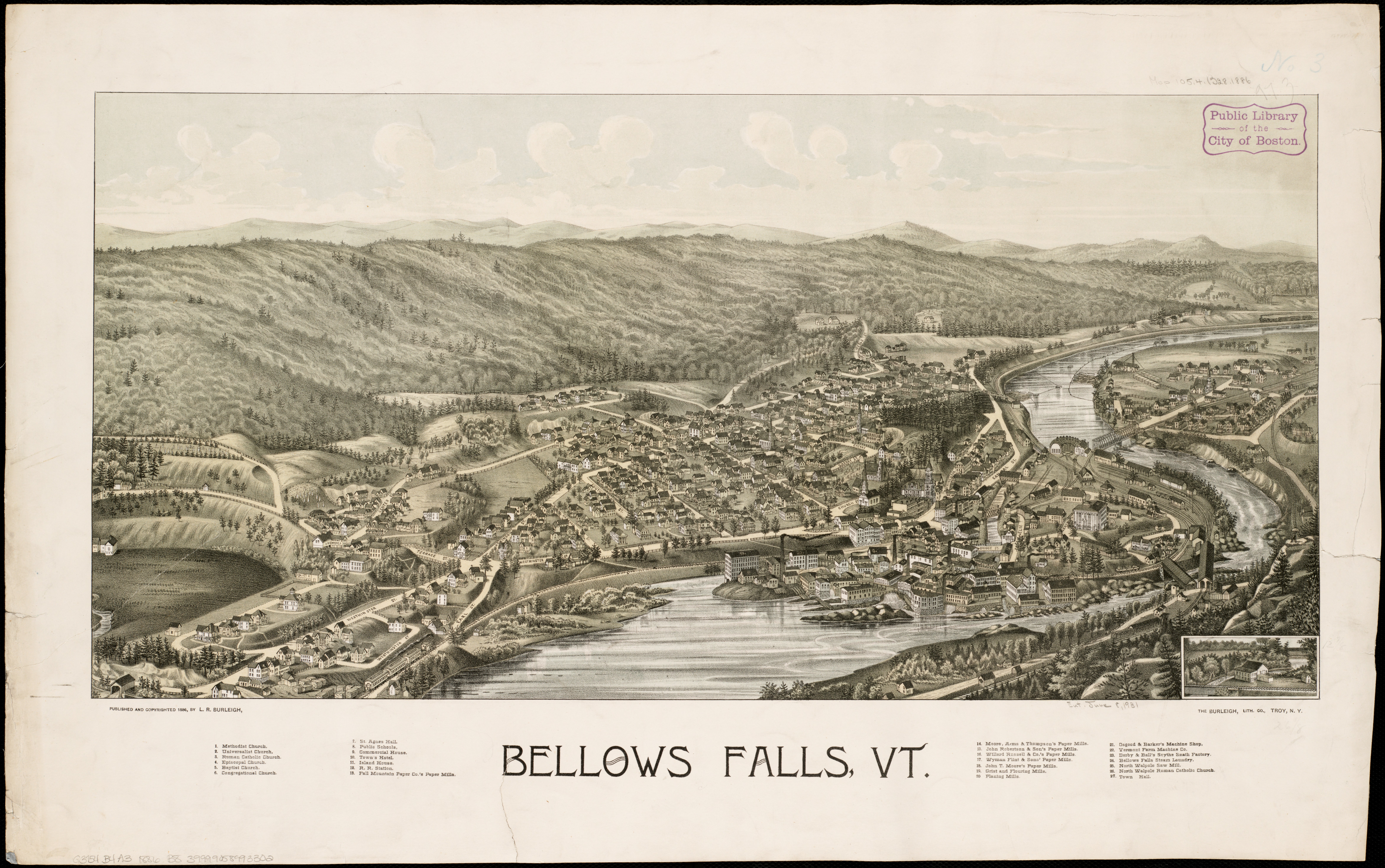
Bellows Falls, Vermont

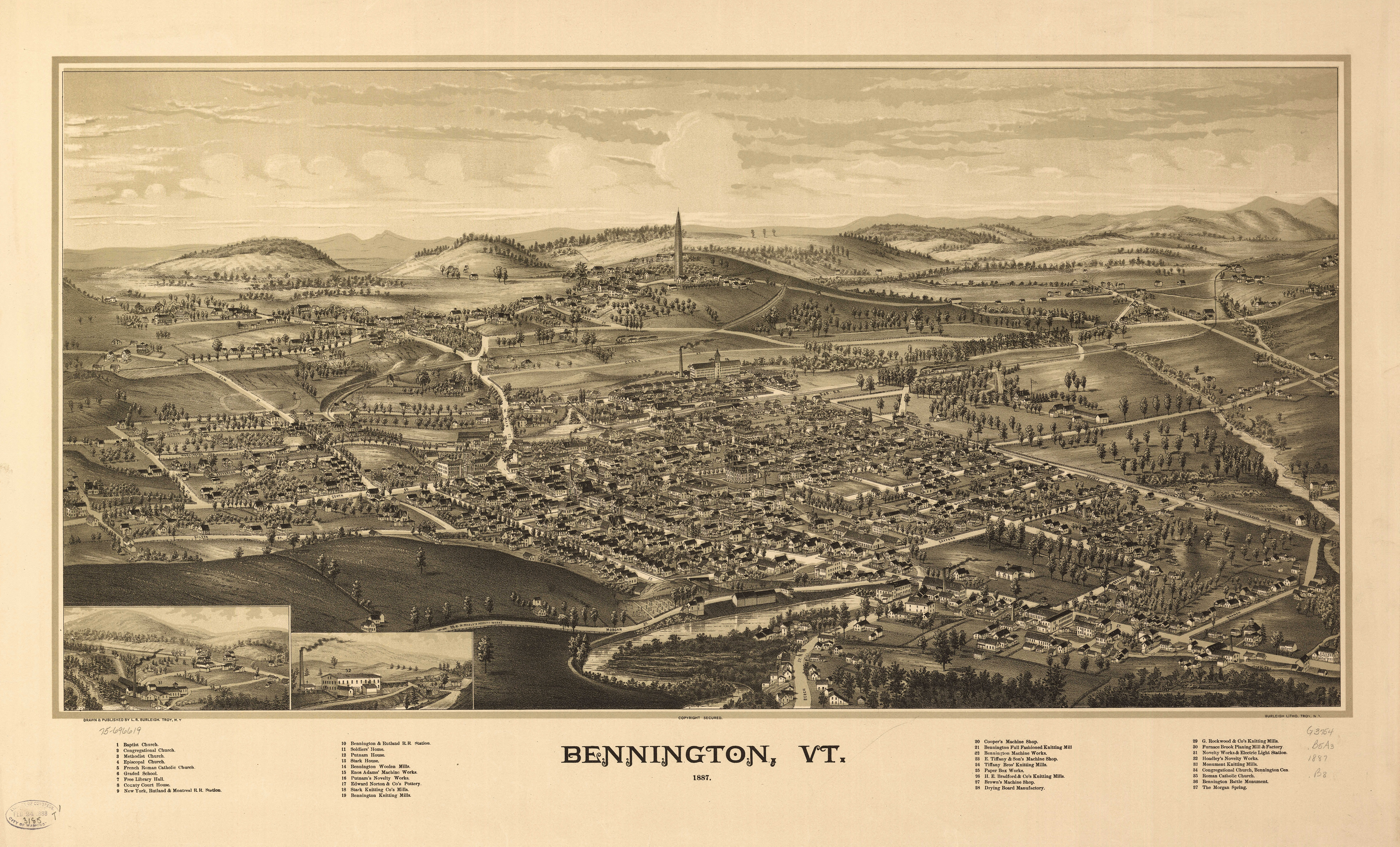
Bennington, Vermont

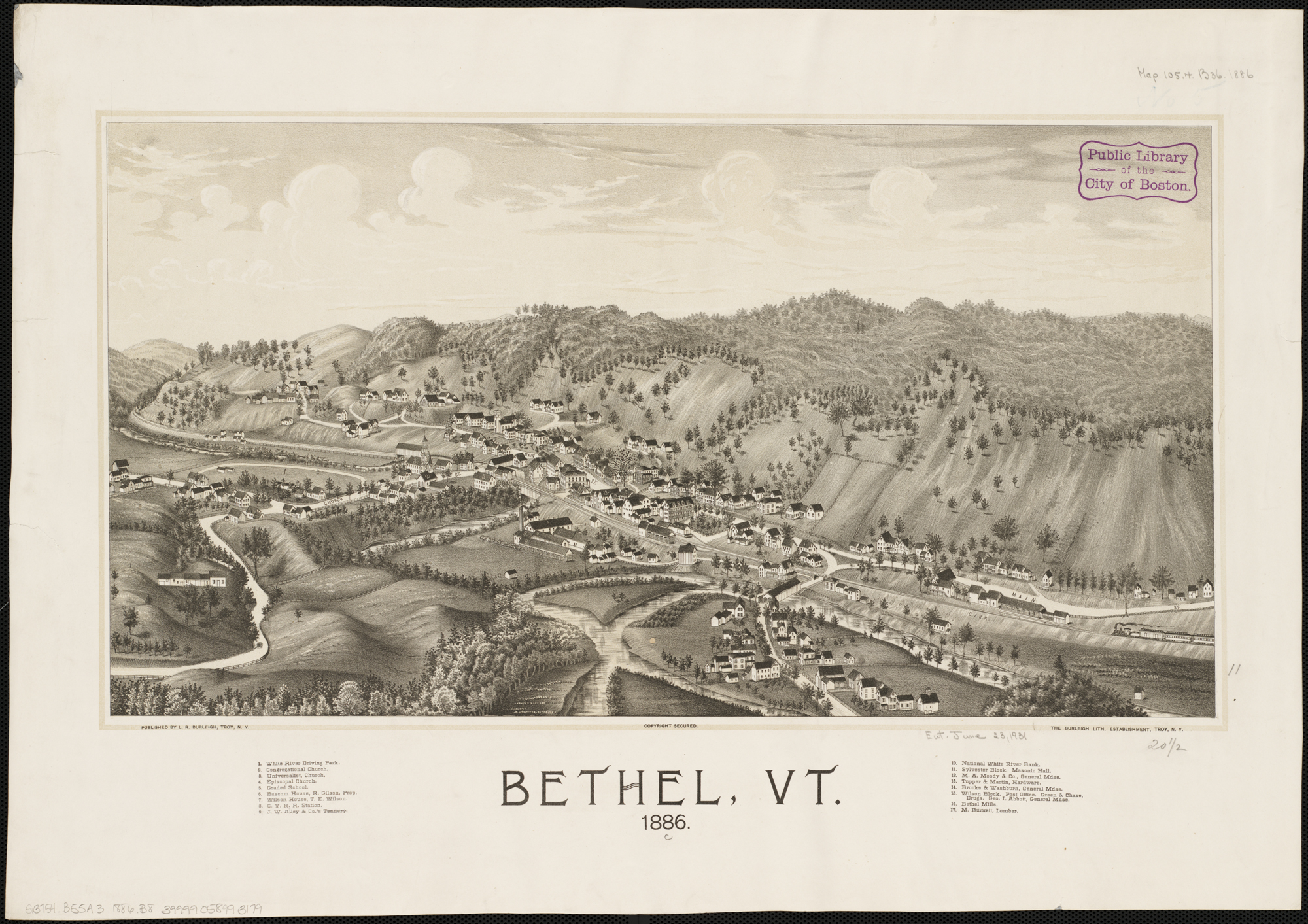
Bethel, Vermont

Binghamton, New York by J. Lyfe

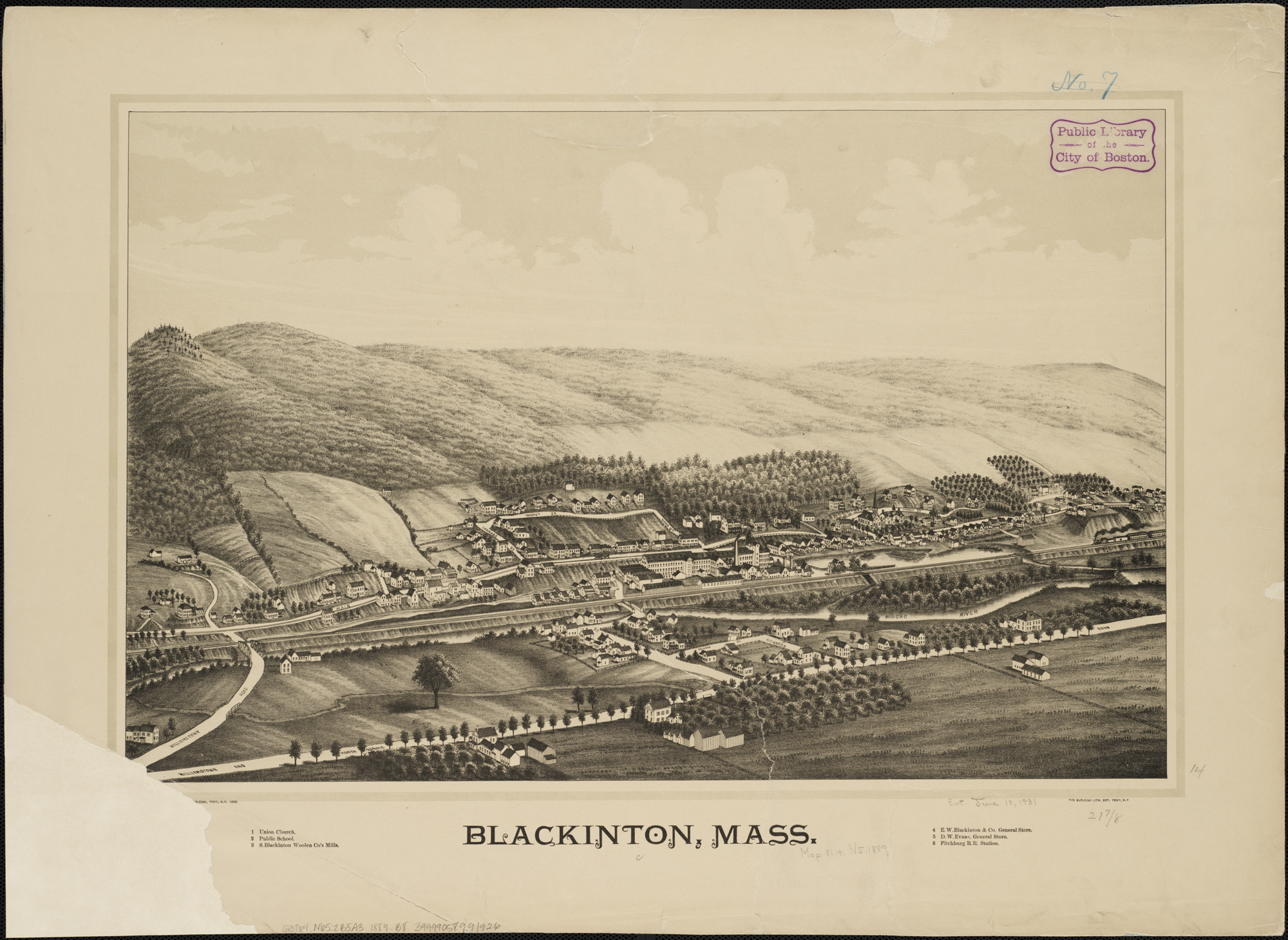
Blackinton, Massachusetts

Brandon, Vermont

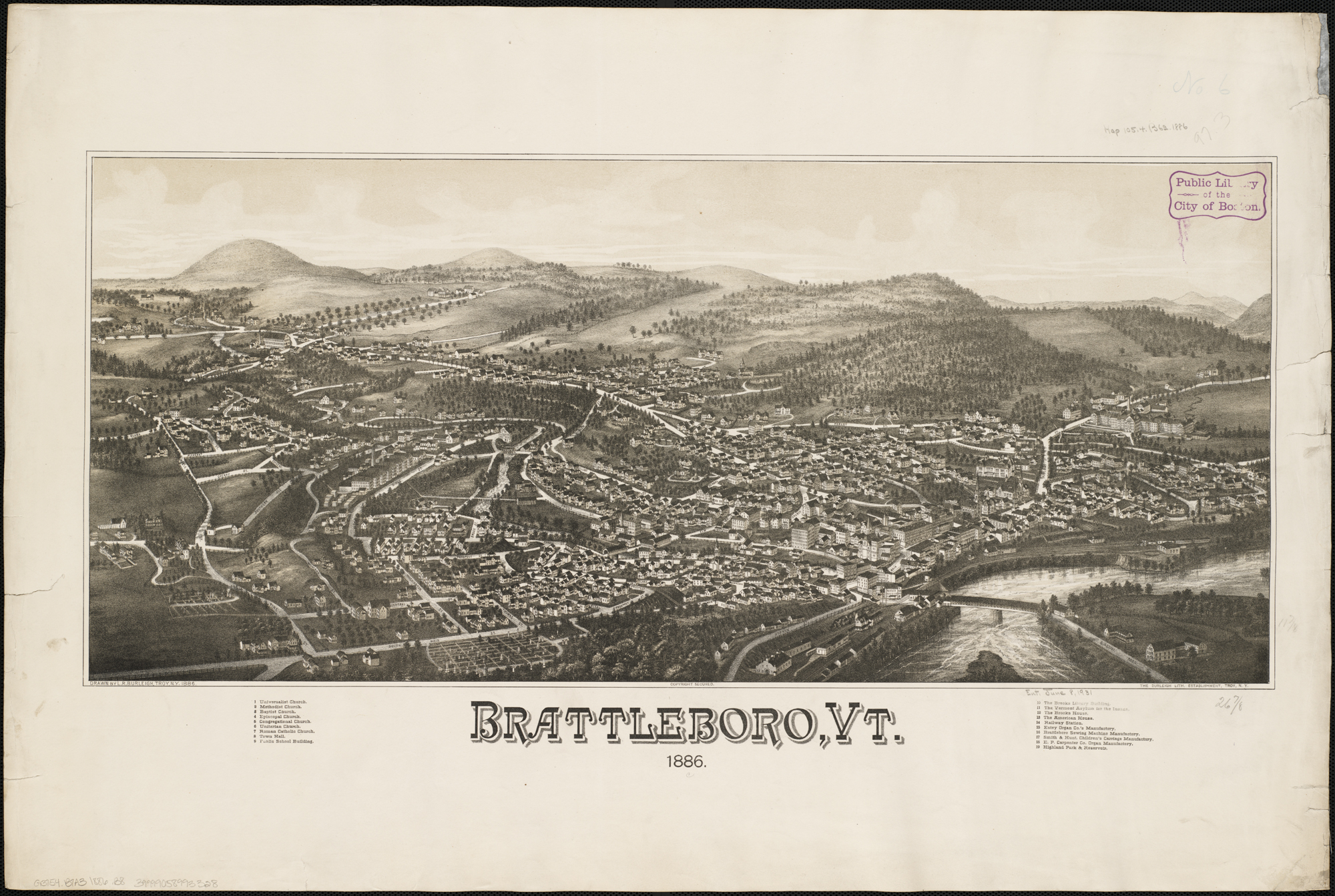
Brattleboro, Vermont

Broadalbin, New York (copyright 1880 and does not say drawn by L.R. Burleigh

Cambridge, New York

Camden, New York

Canastota, New York

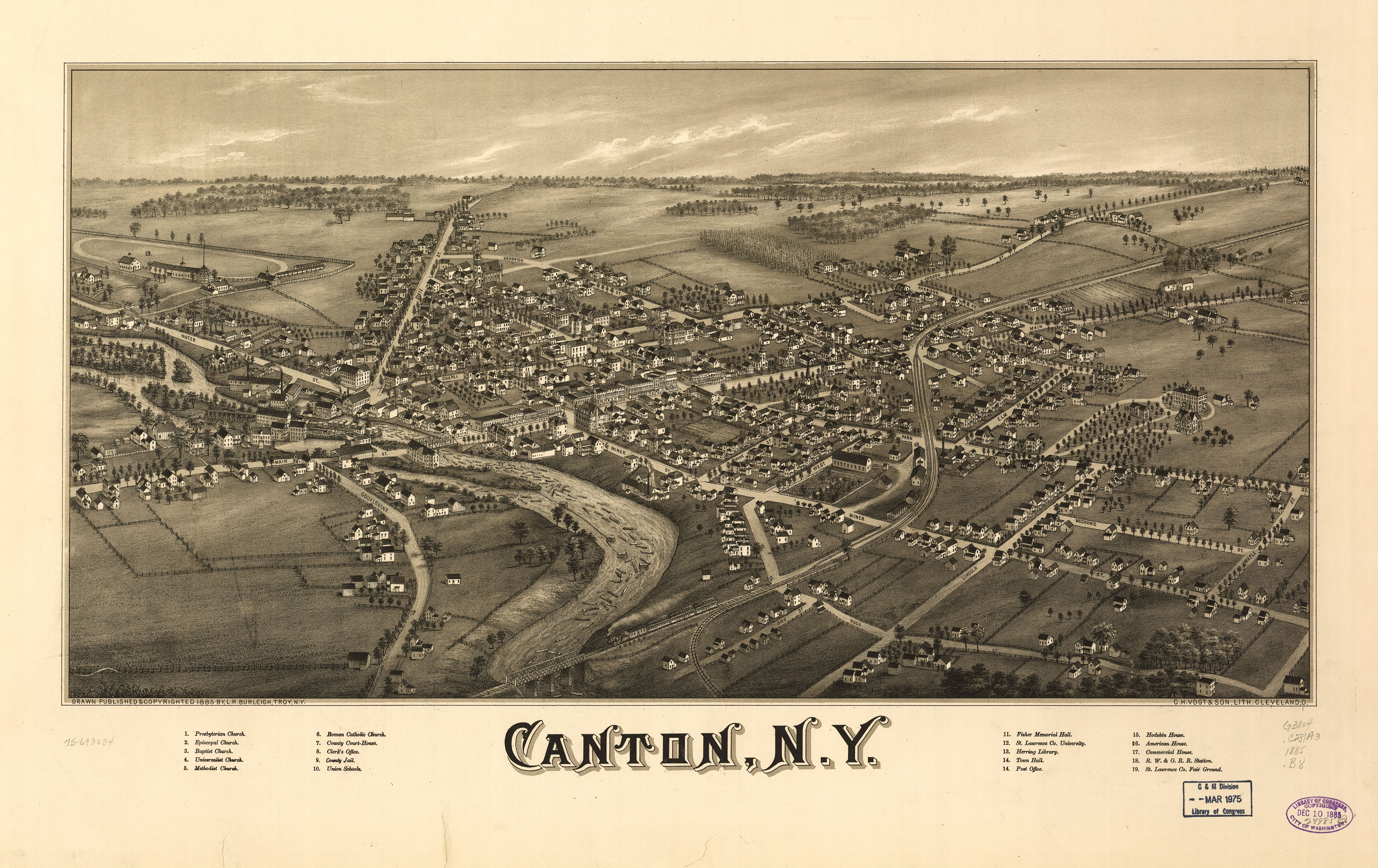
Canton, New York

Carthage, New York

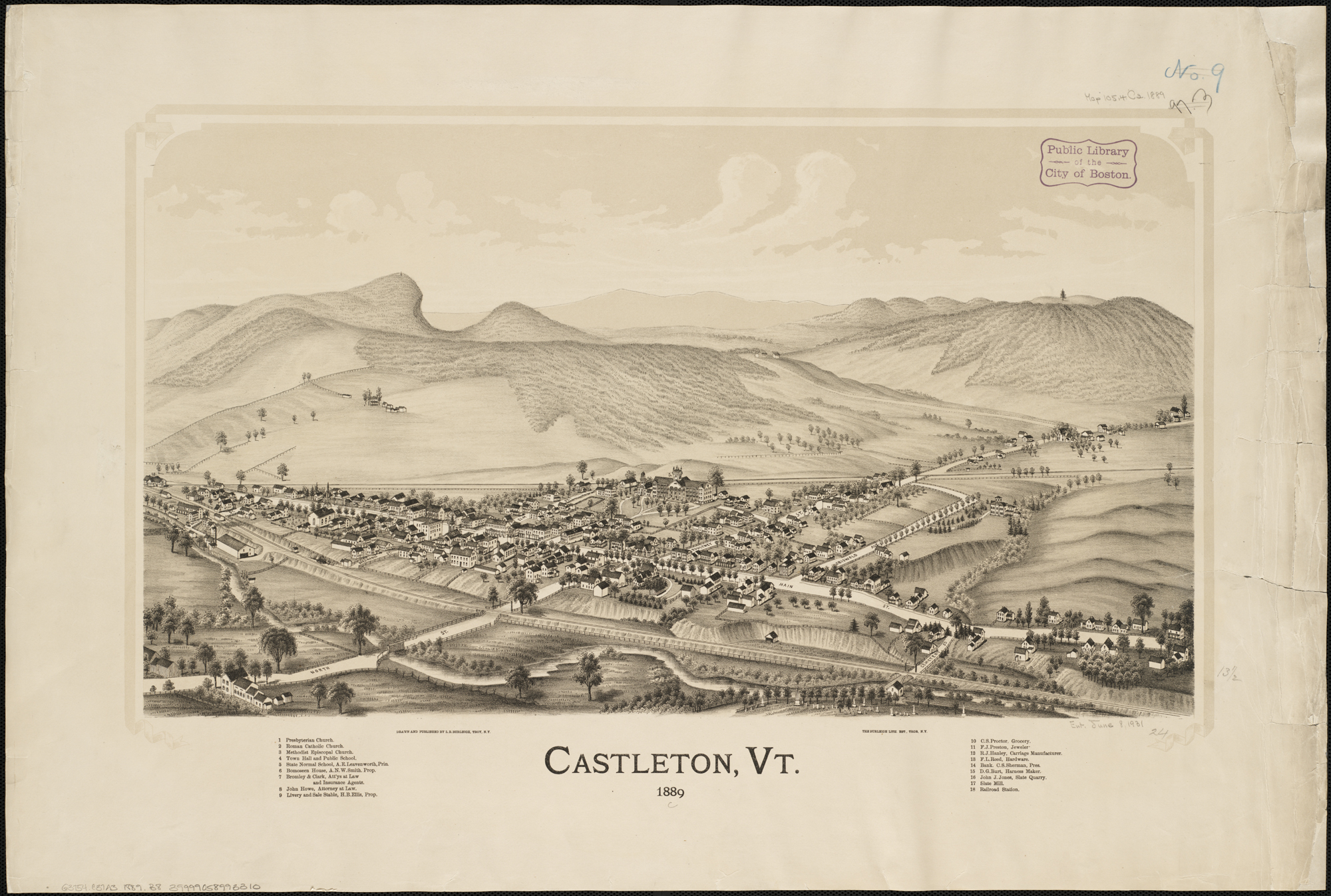
Castleton, Vermont

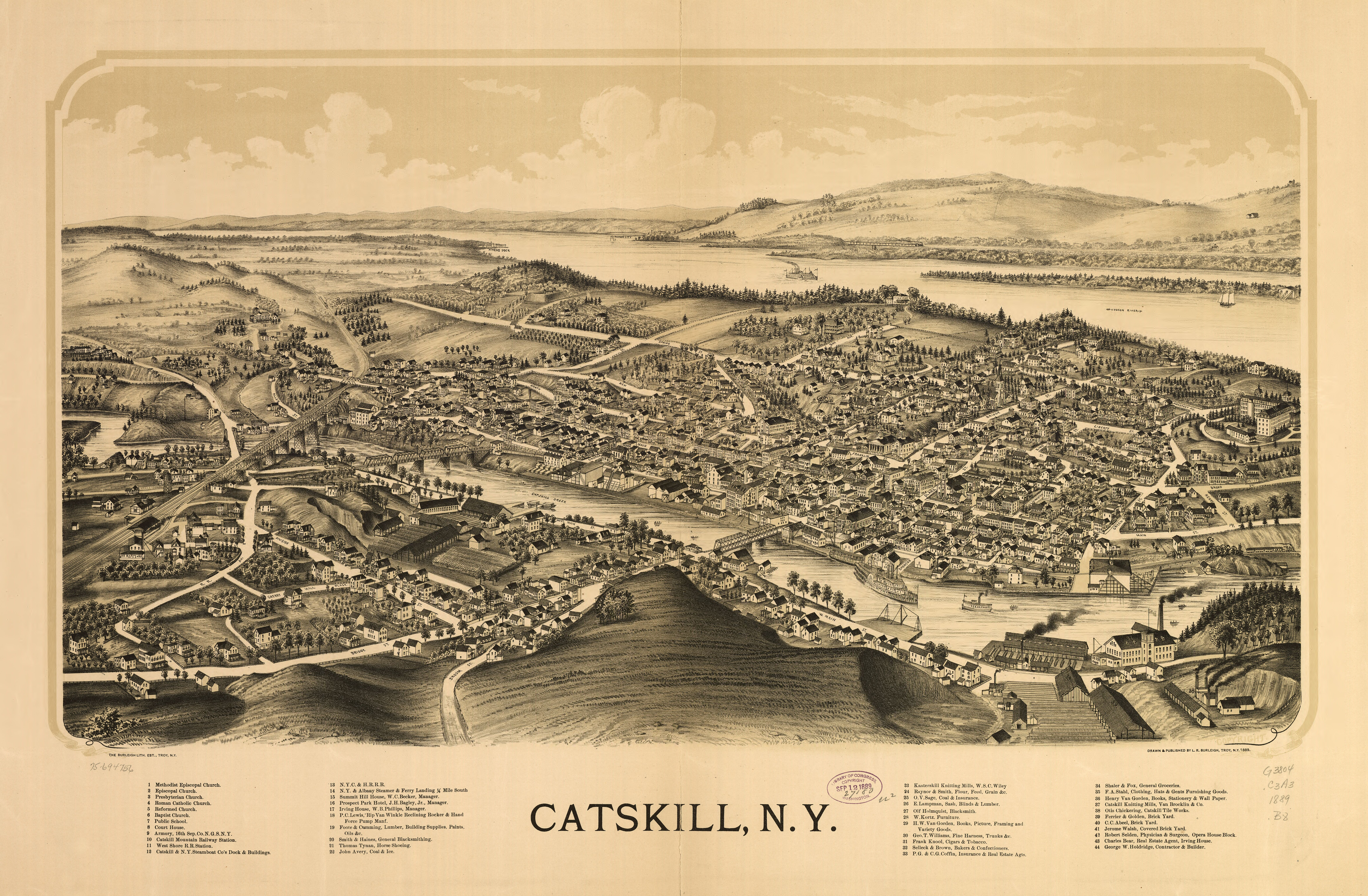
Catskill, New York

Cazenovia, New York

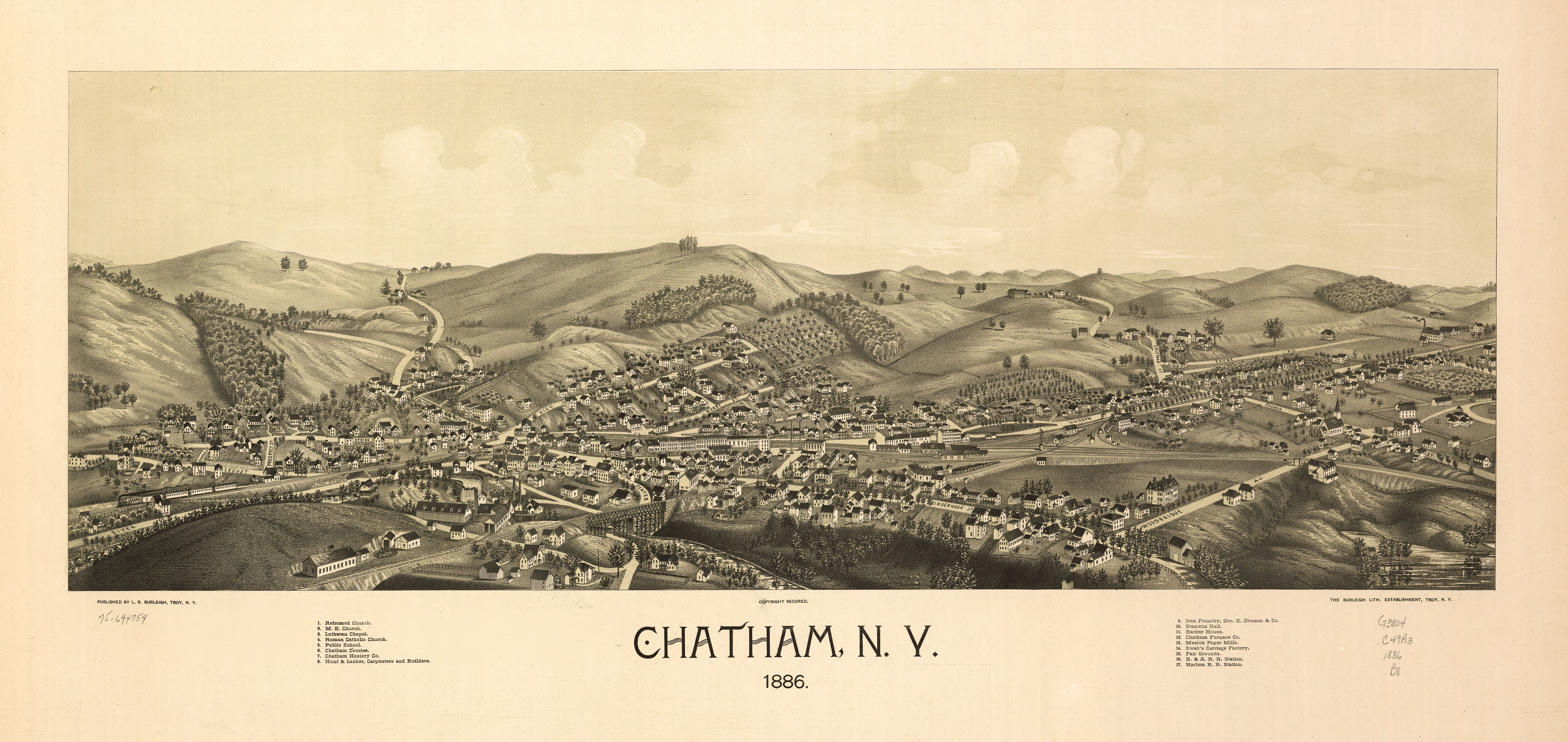
Chatham, New York

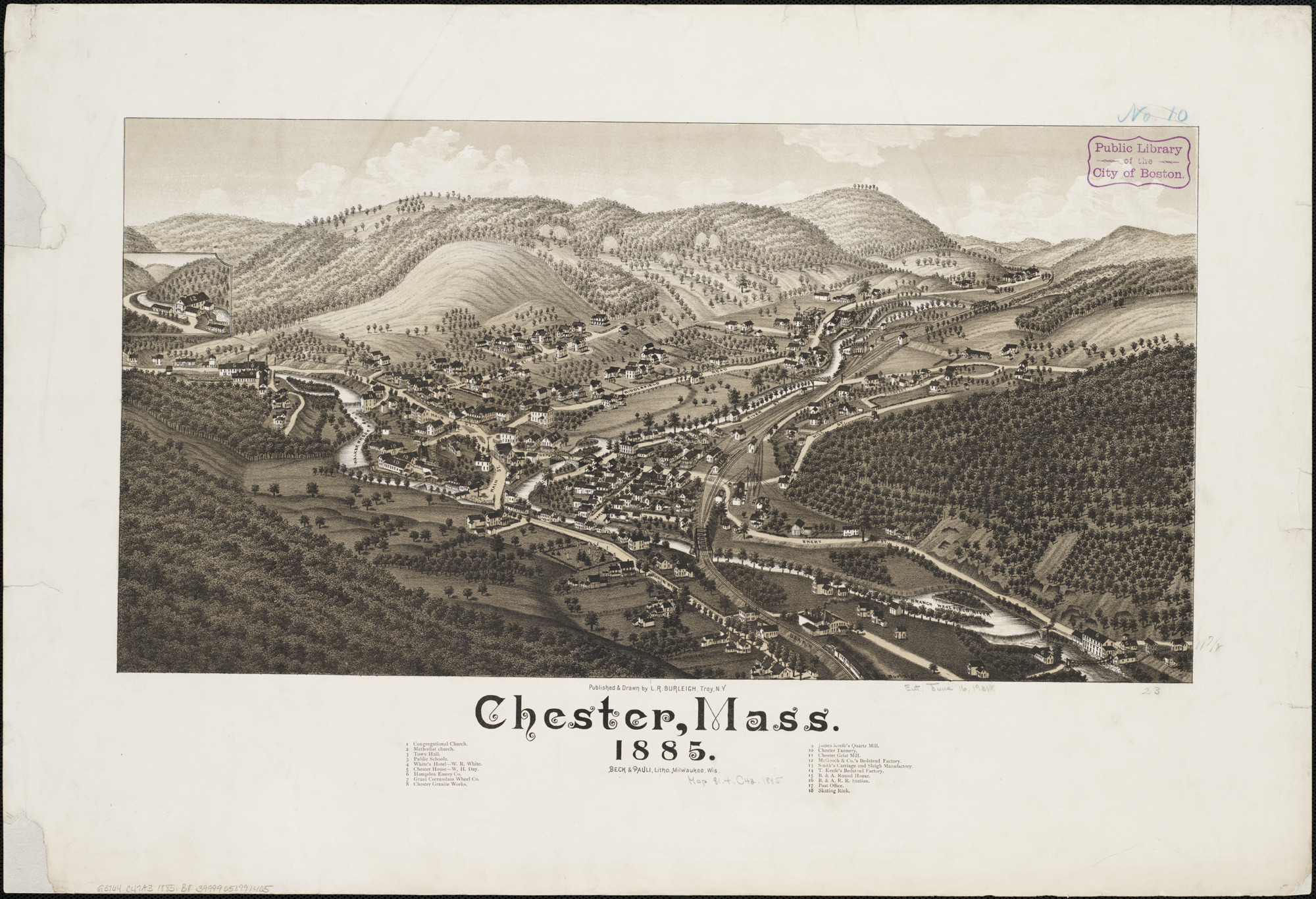
Chester, Massachusetts

City of Kingston, New York printed by a Philadelphia firm Burleigh signature bottom right

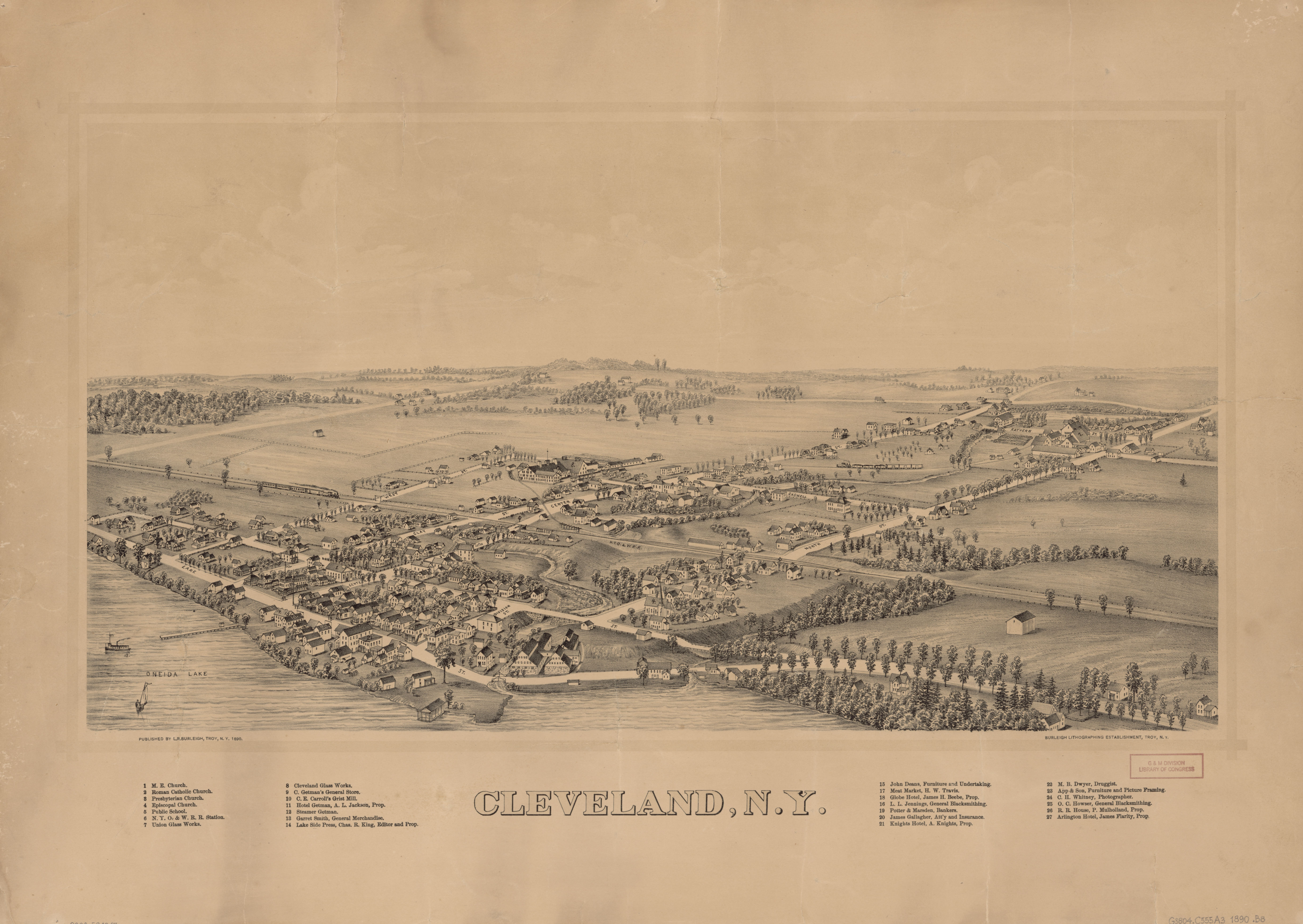
Cleveland, New York

Clinton, Oneida County, New York

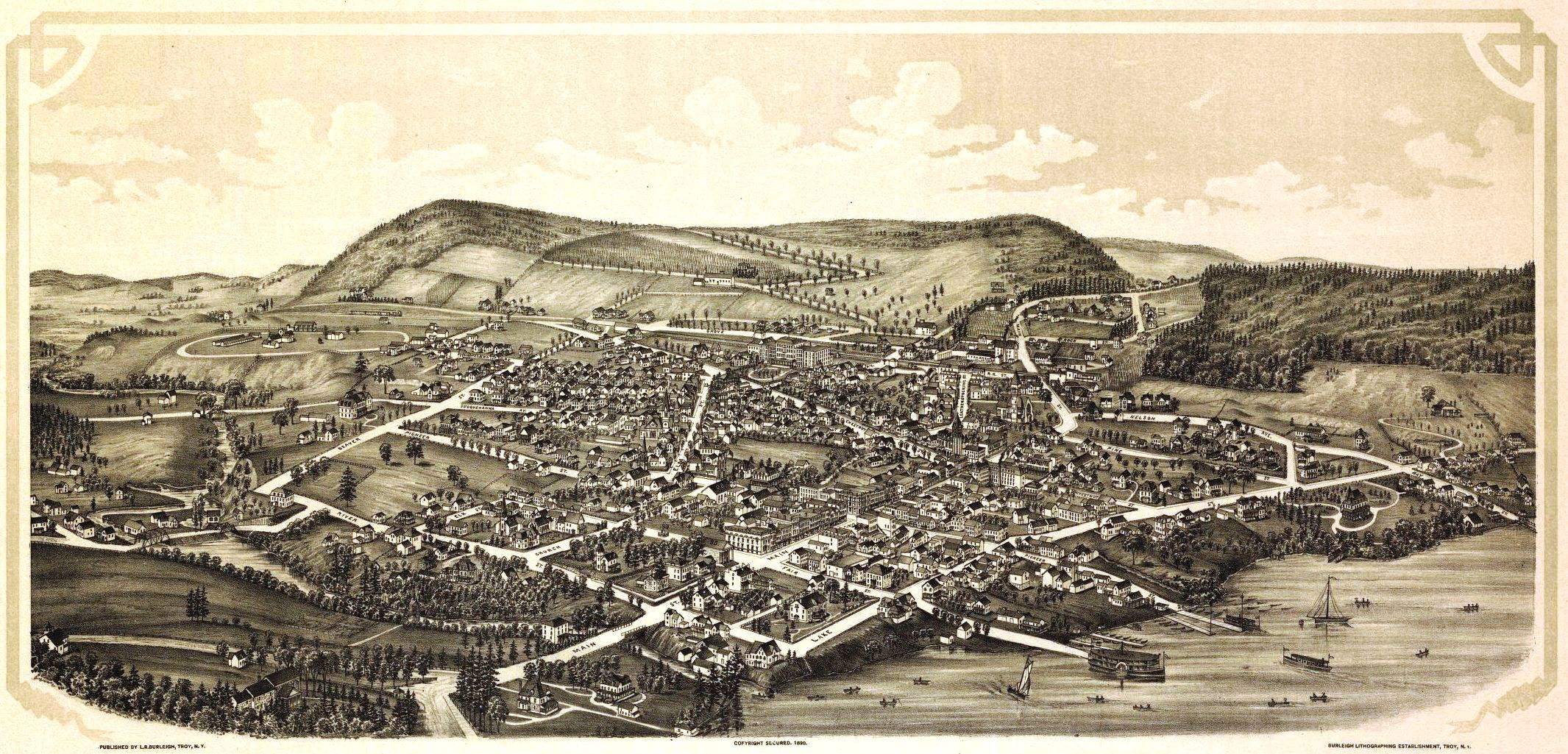
Cooperstown, New York published by Burleigh

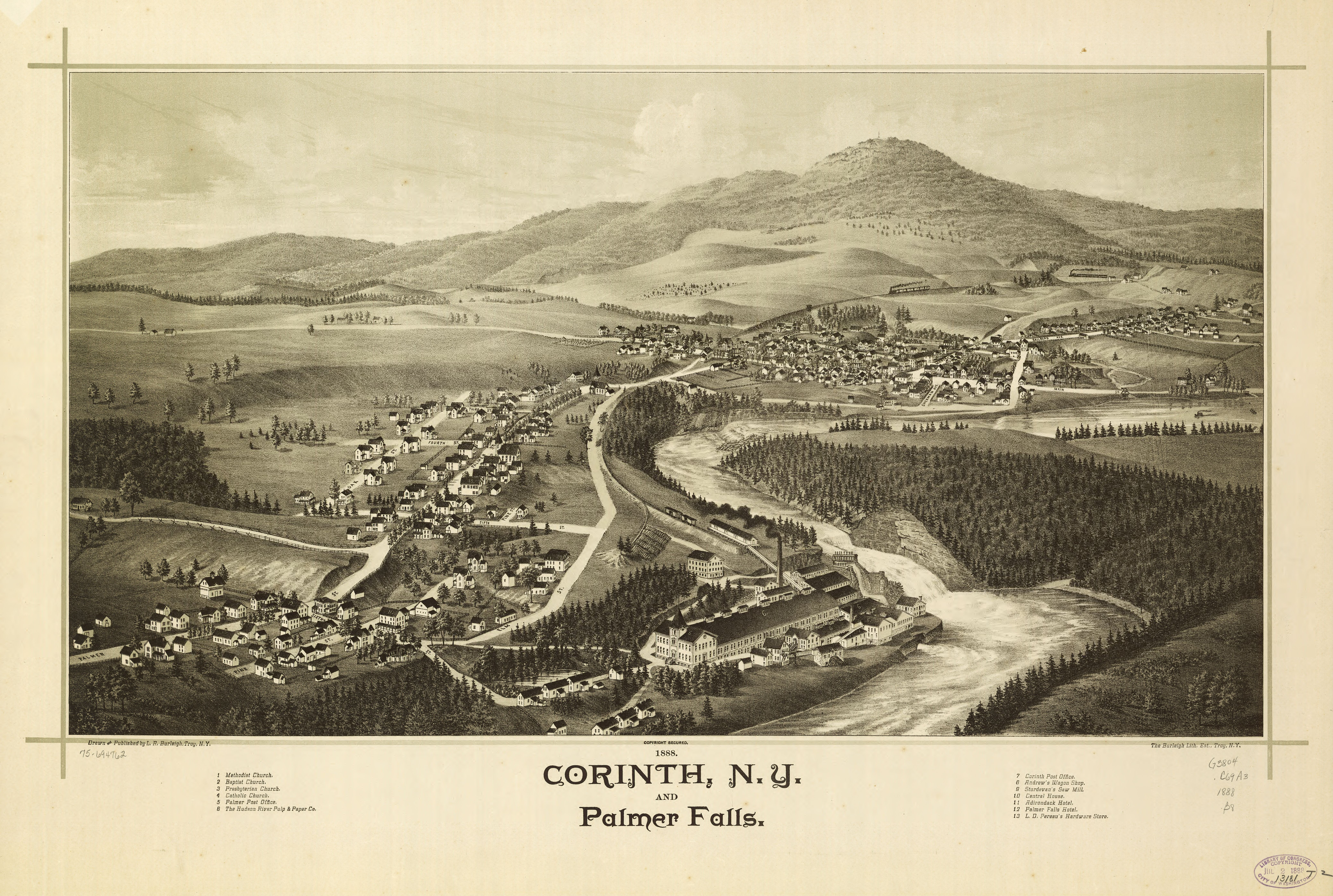
Corinth, New York and Palmer Falls

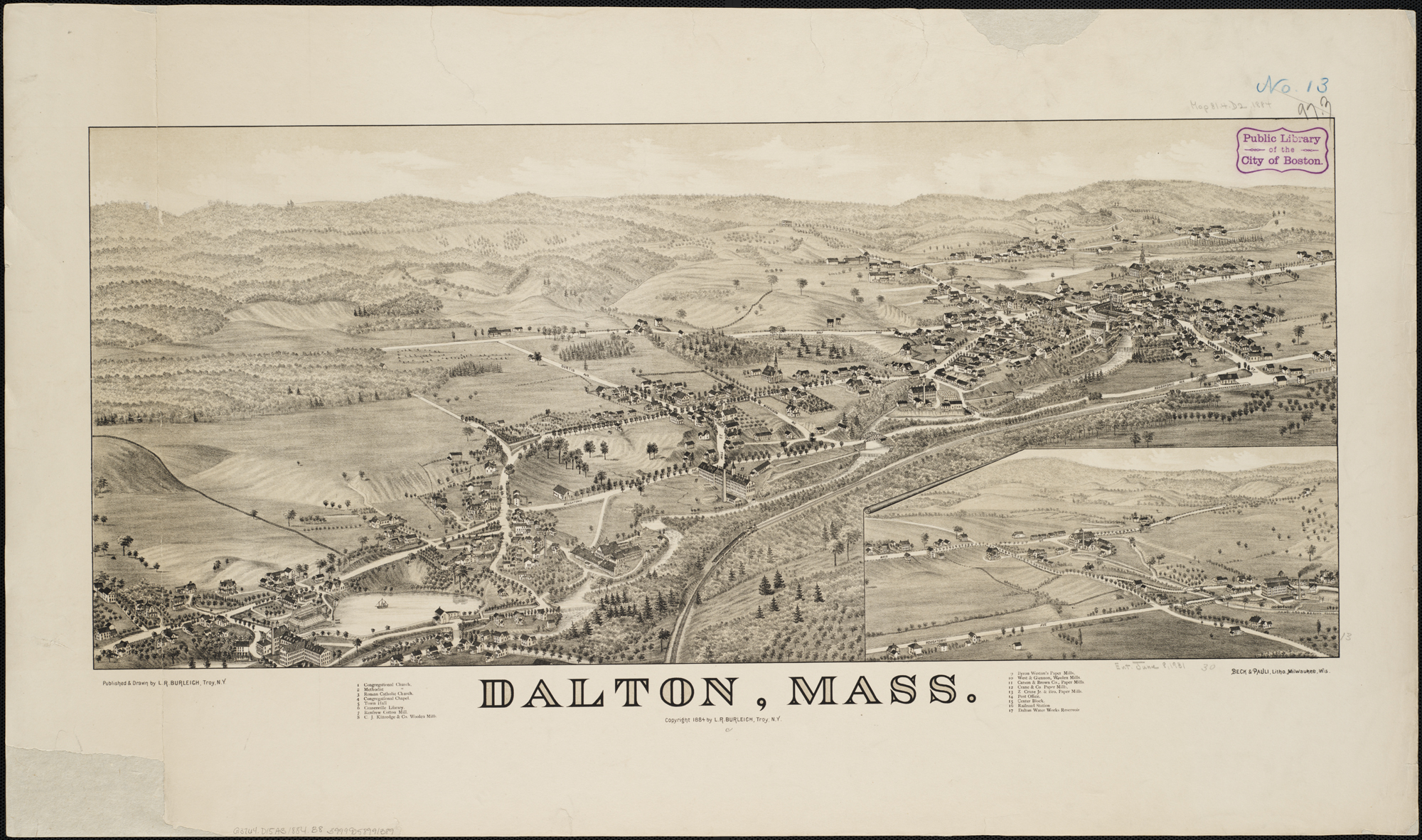
Dalton, Massachusetts

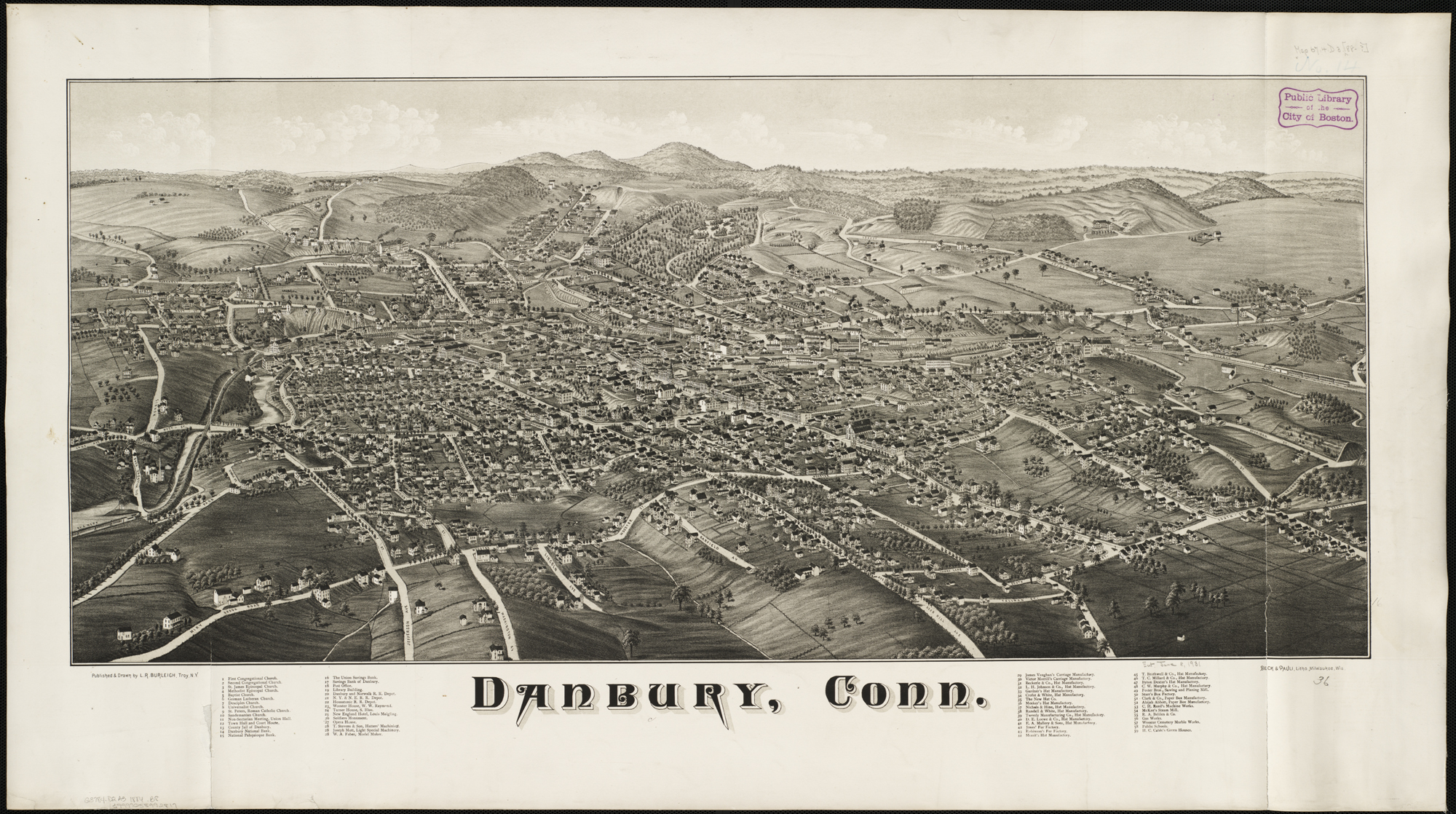
Danbury, Connecticut

Delhi, New York

Deposit, New York

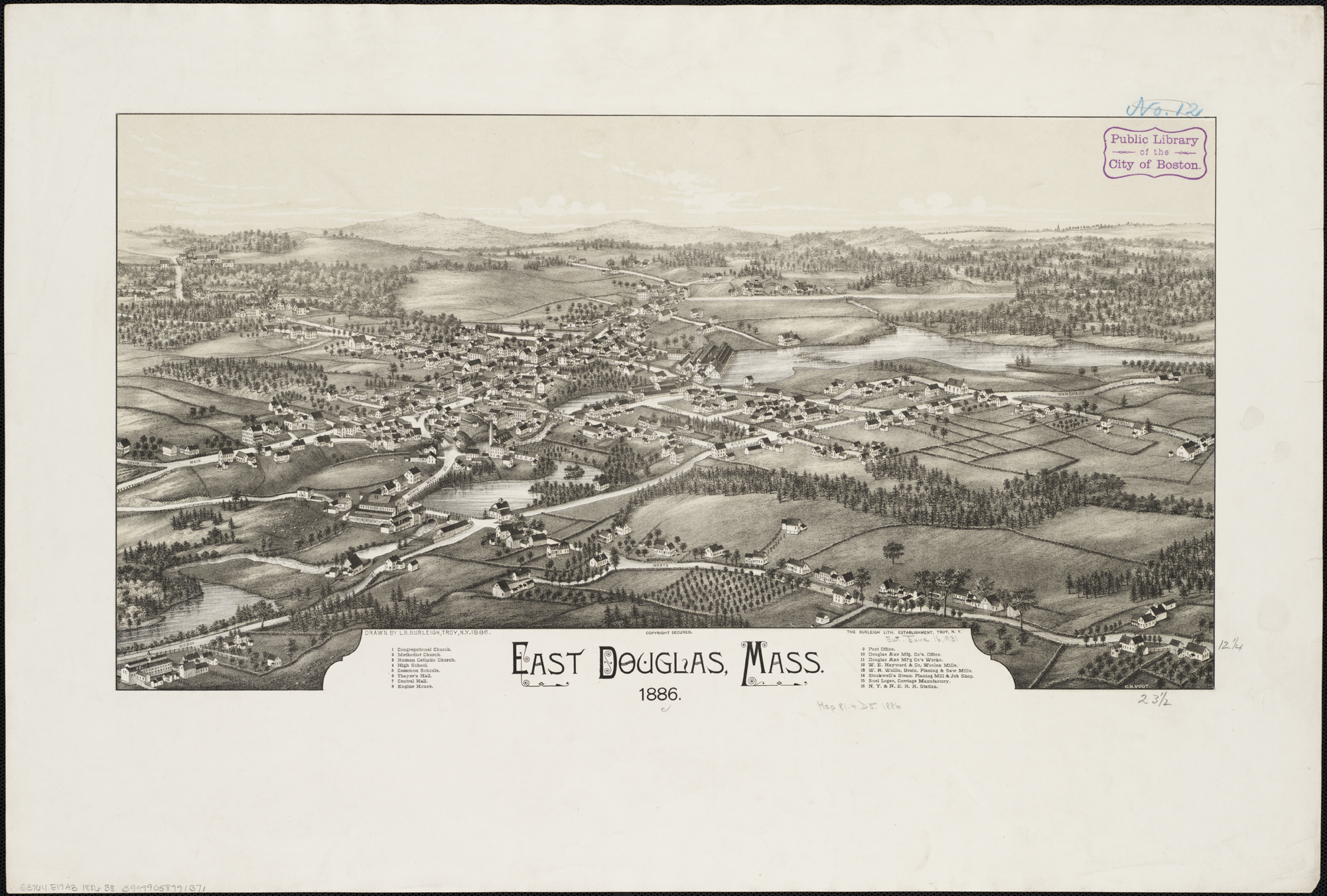
East Douglas, Massachusetts

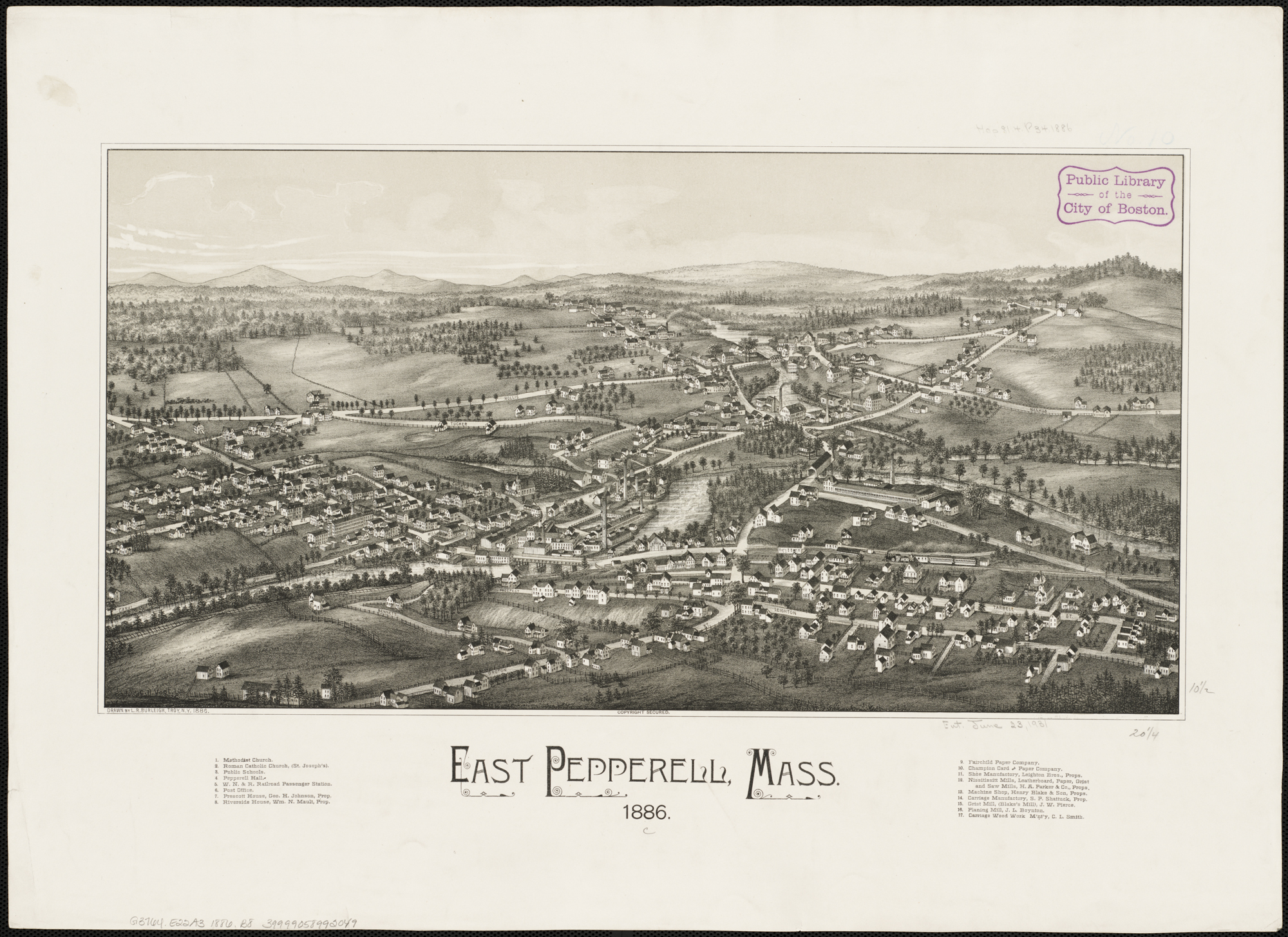
East Pepperell, Massachusetts

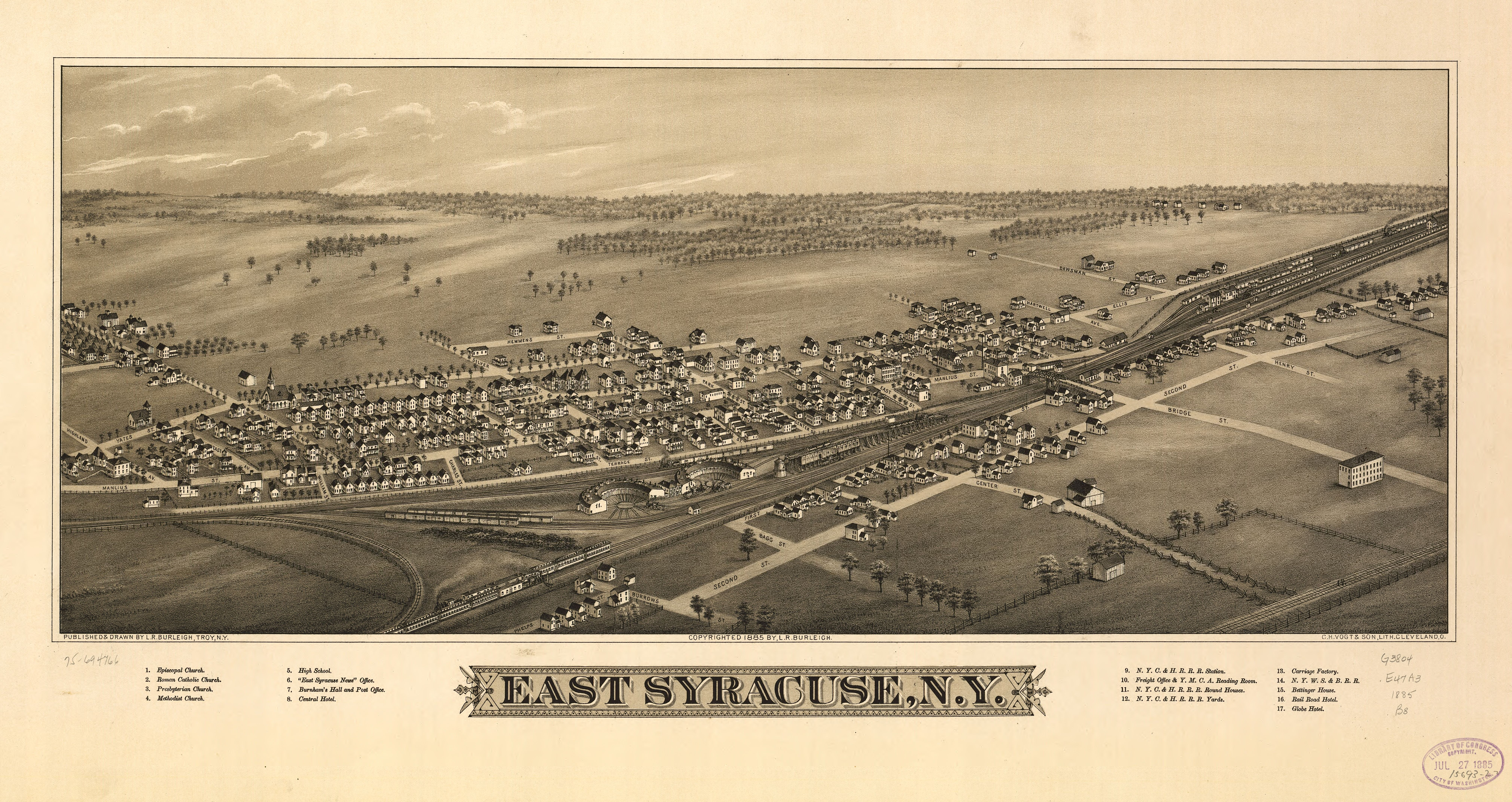
East Syracuse

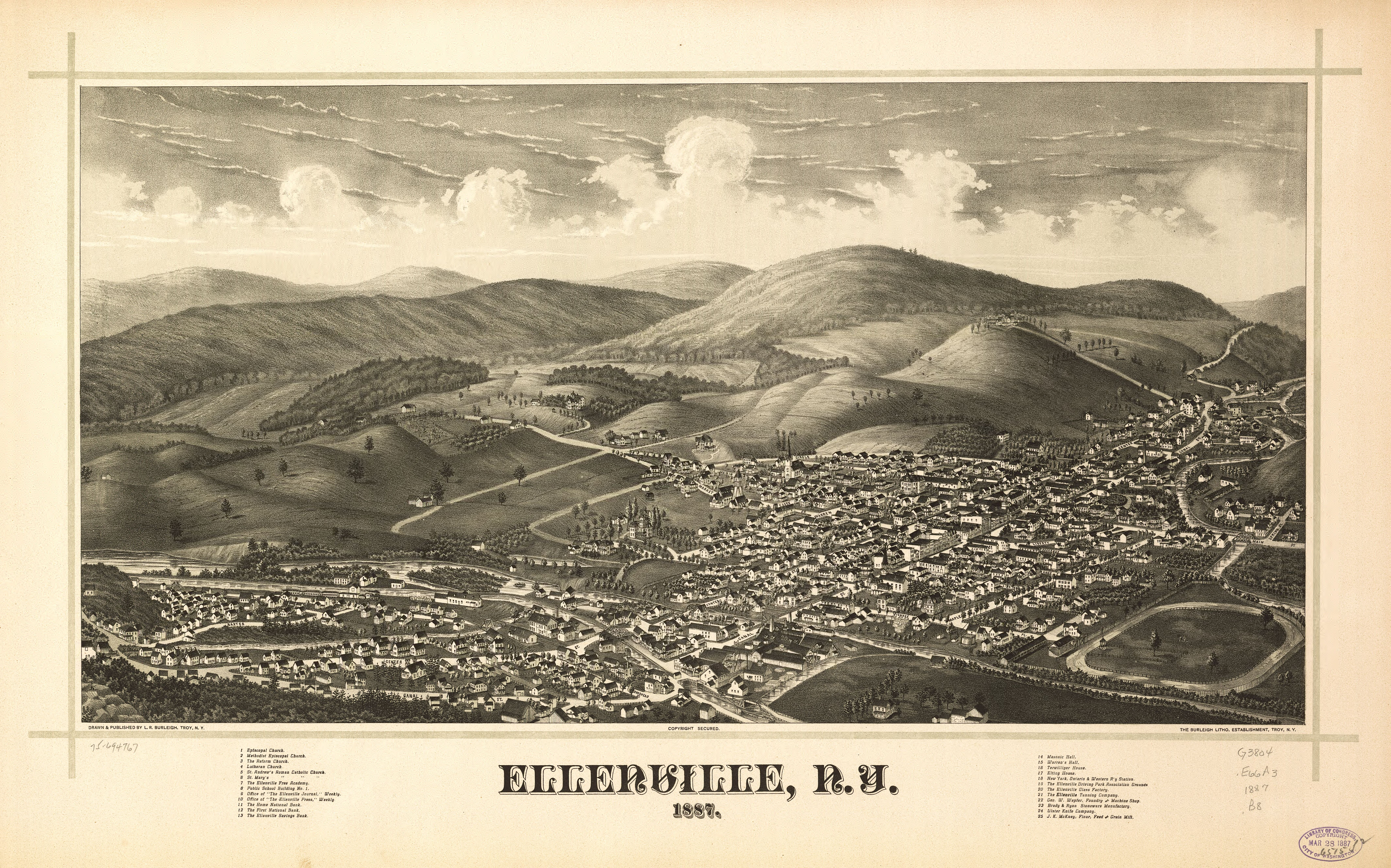
Ellenville, New York

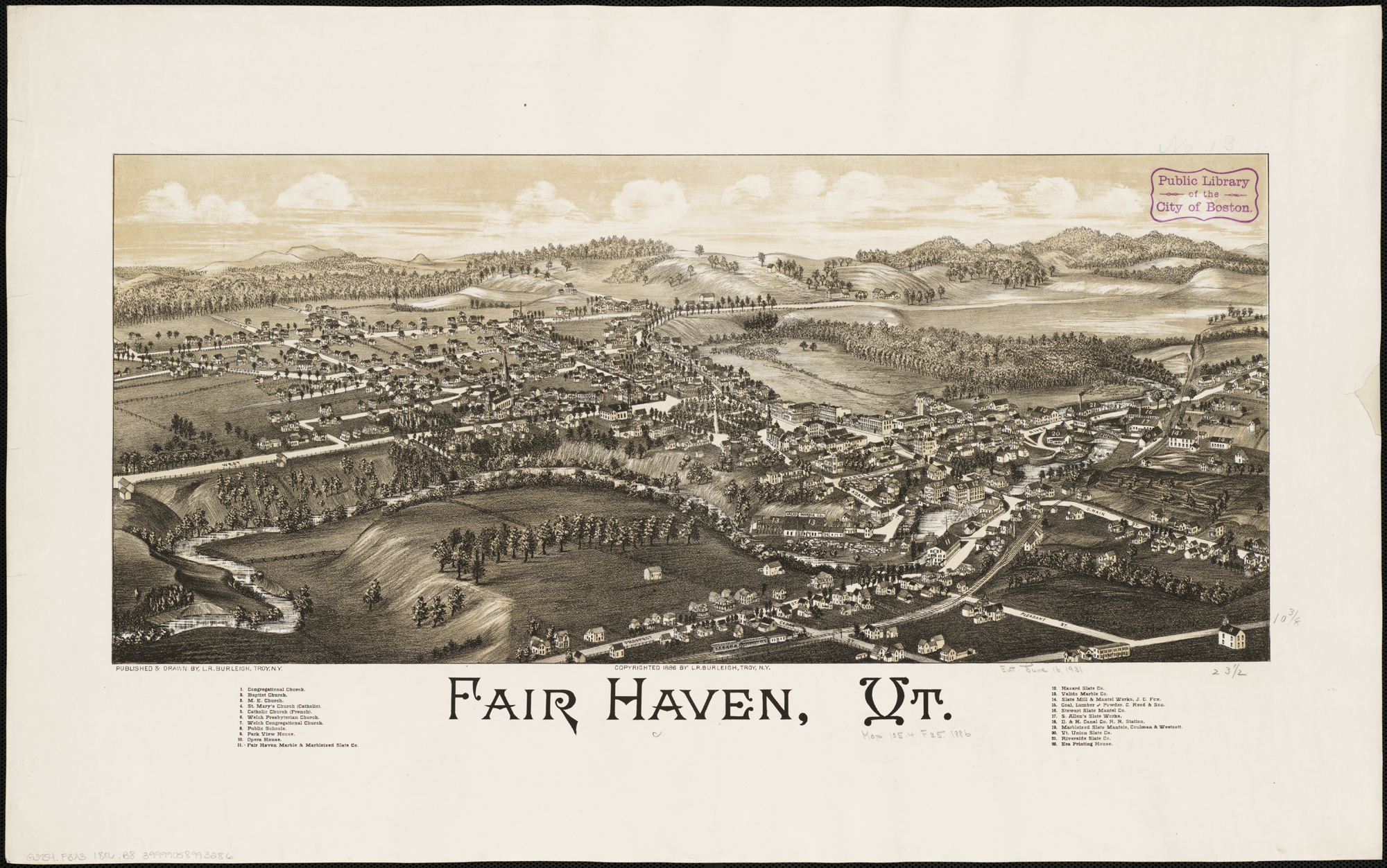
Fair Haven, Vermont

Fairport, New York

Fishkill-on-the-Hudson

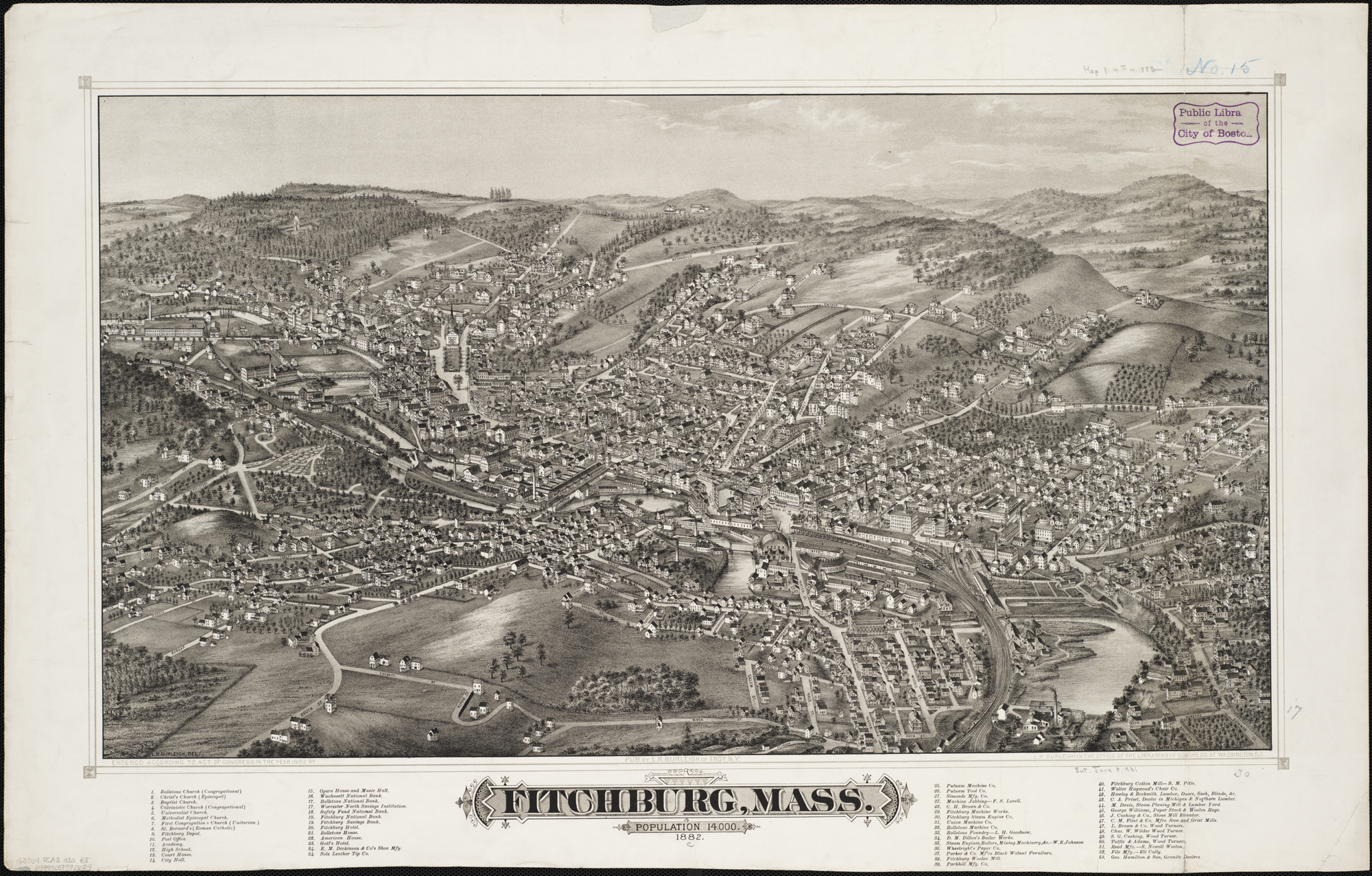
Fitchburg, Massachusetts

Fonda, New York

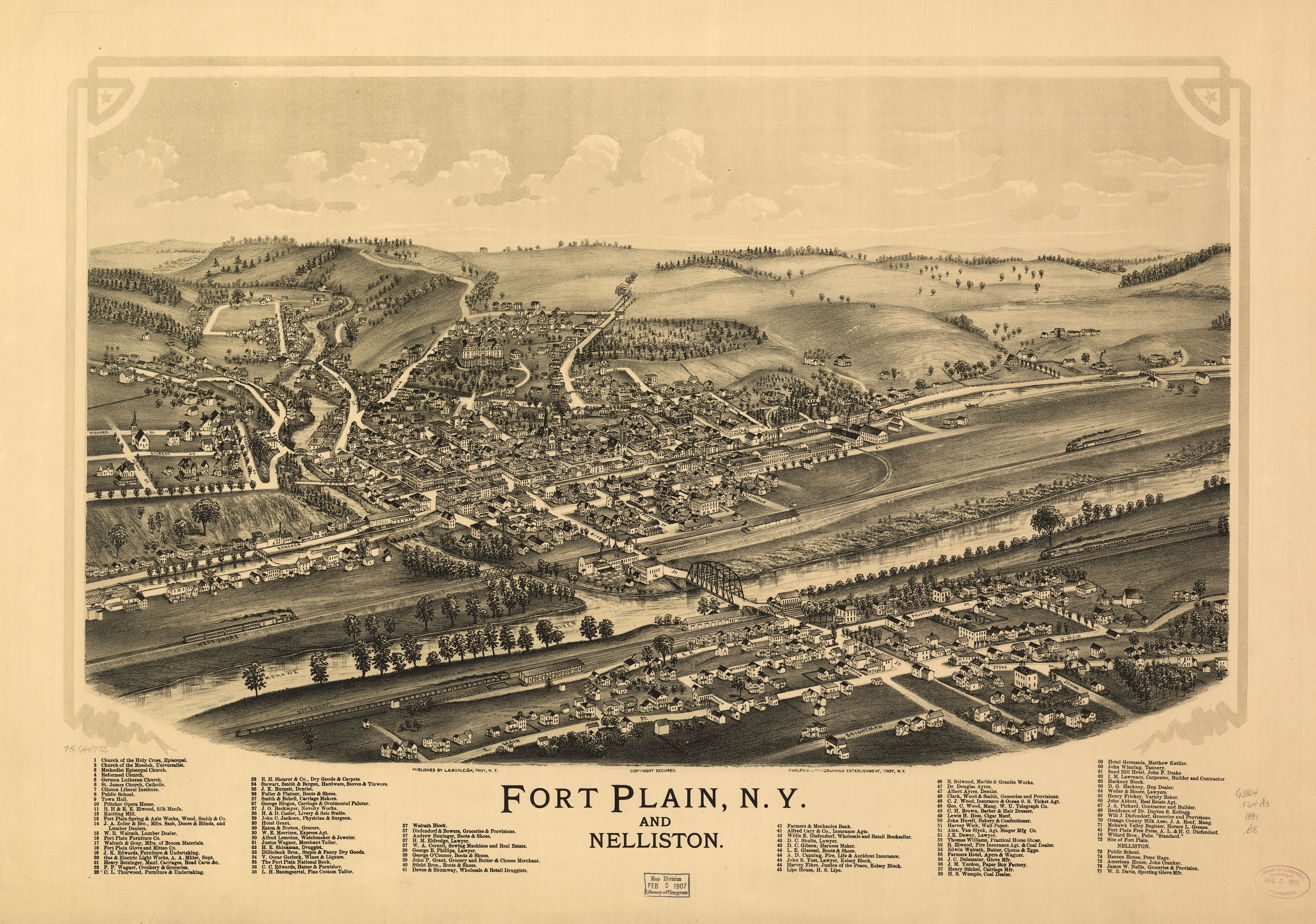
Fort Plain, New York and Nelliston, New York

Frankfort, New York

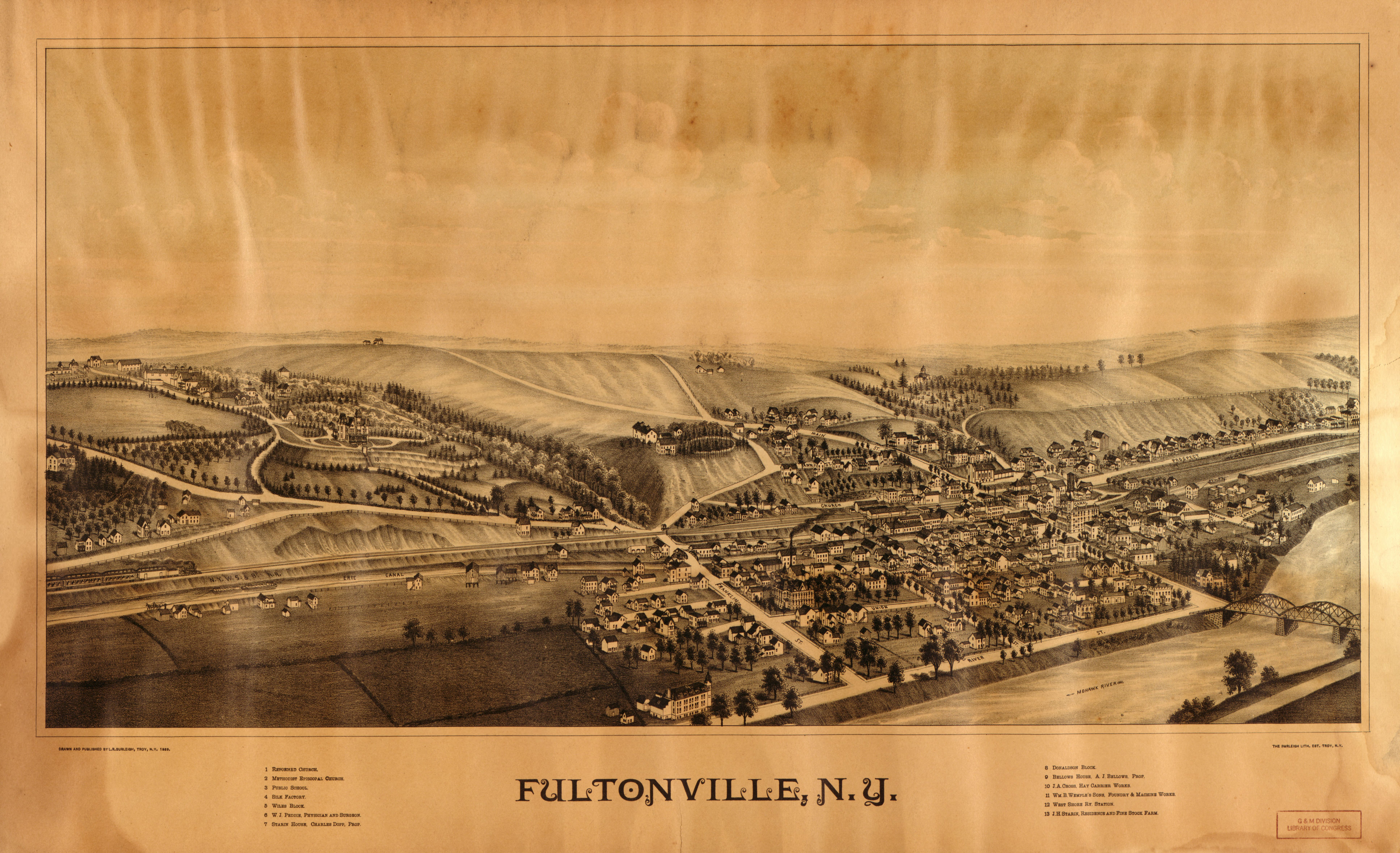
Fultonville, New York

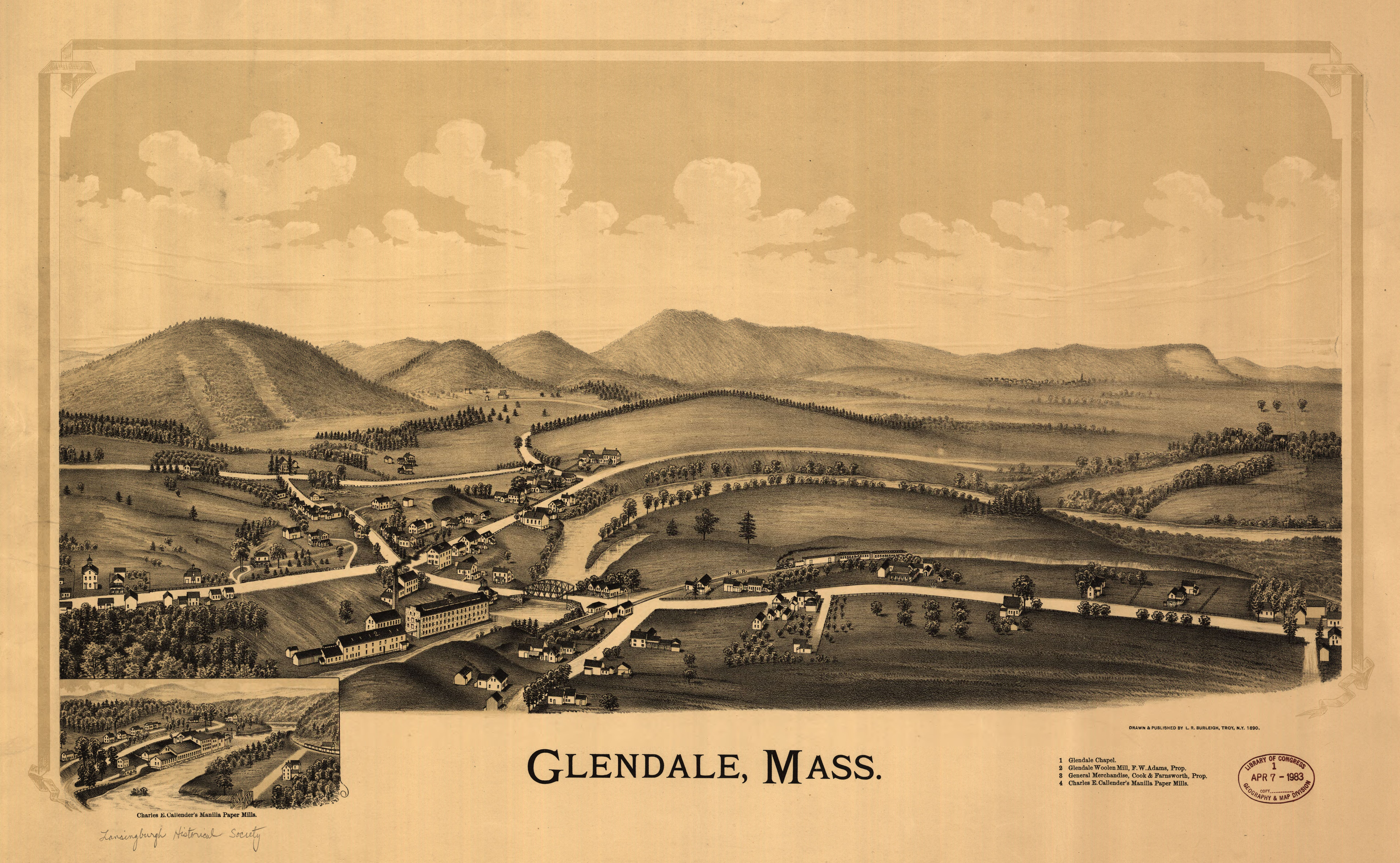
Glendale, Massachusetts

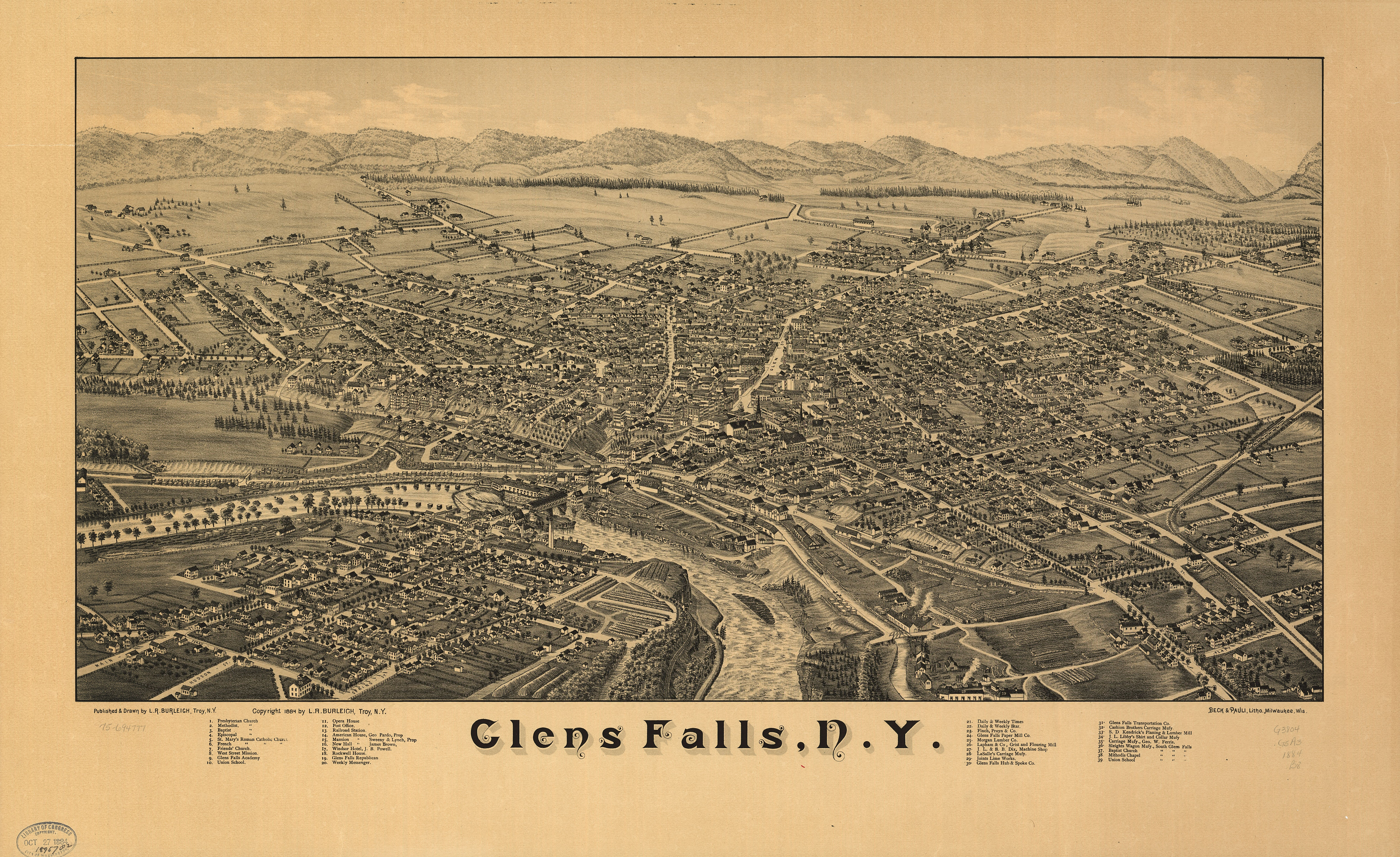
Glens Falls, New York

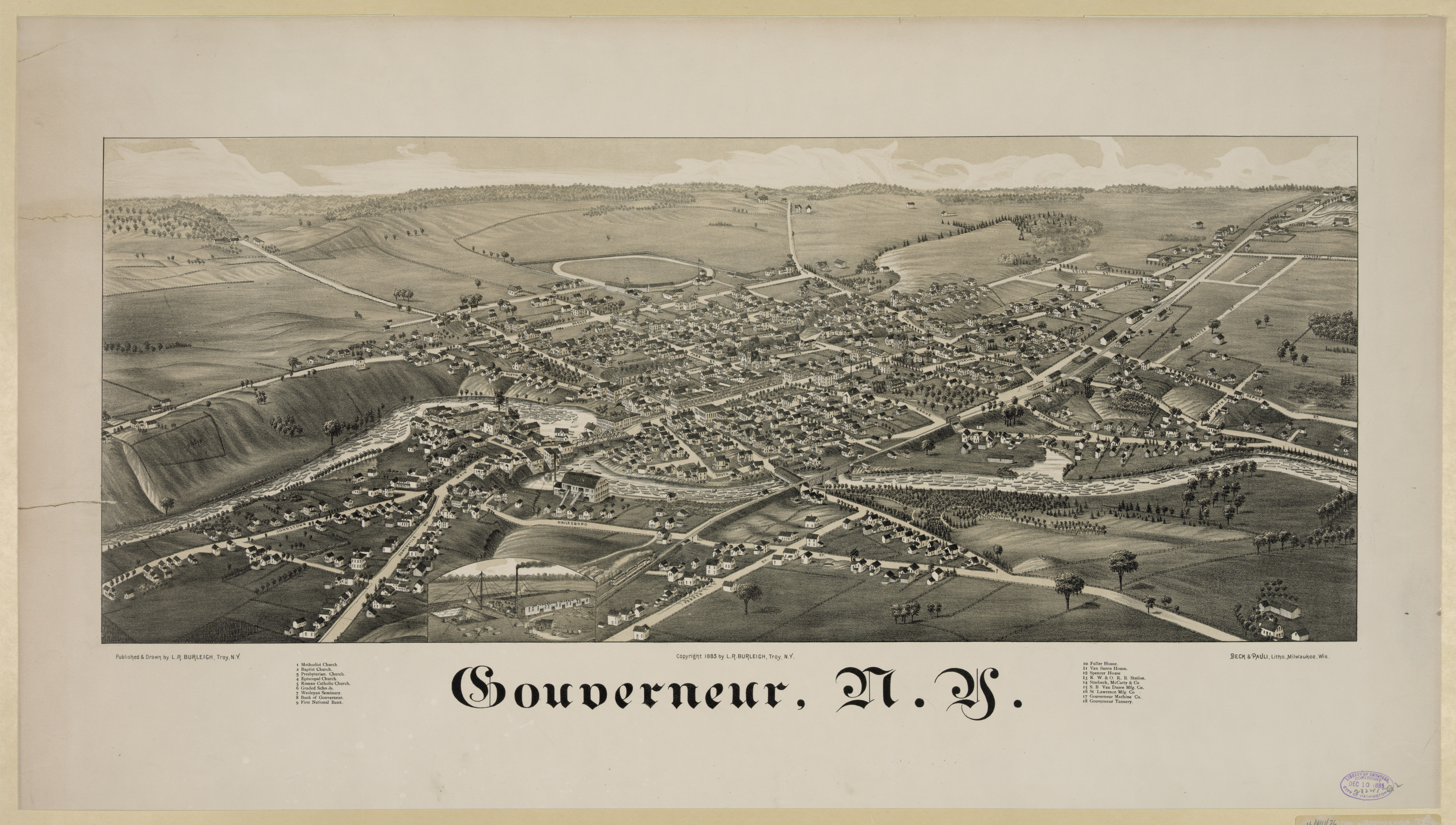
Gouverneur, New York

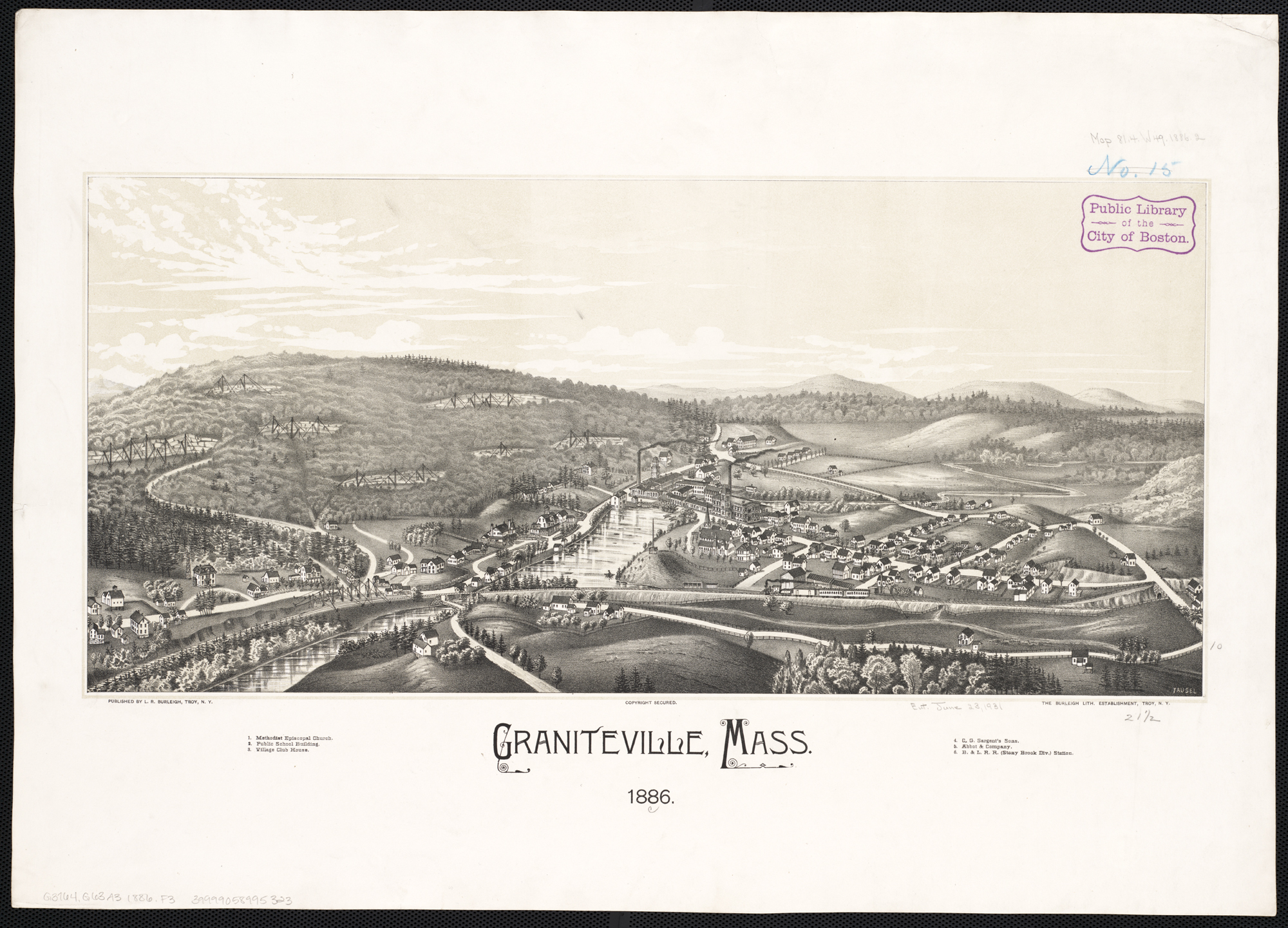
Graniteville, Massachusetts

Granville, New York

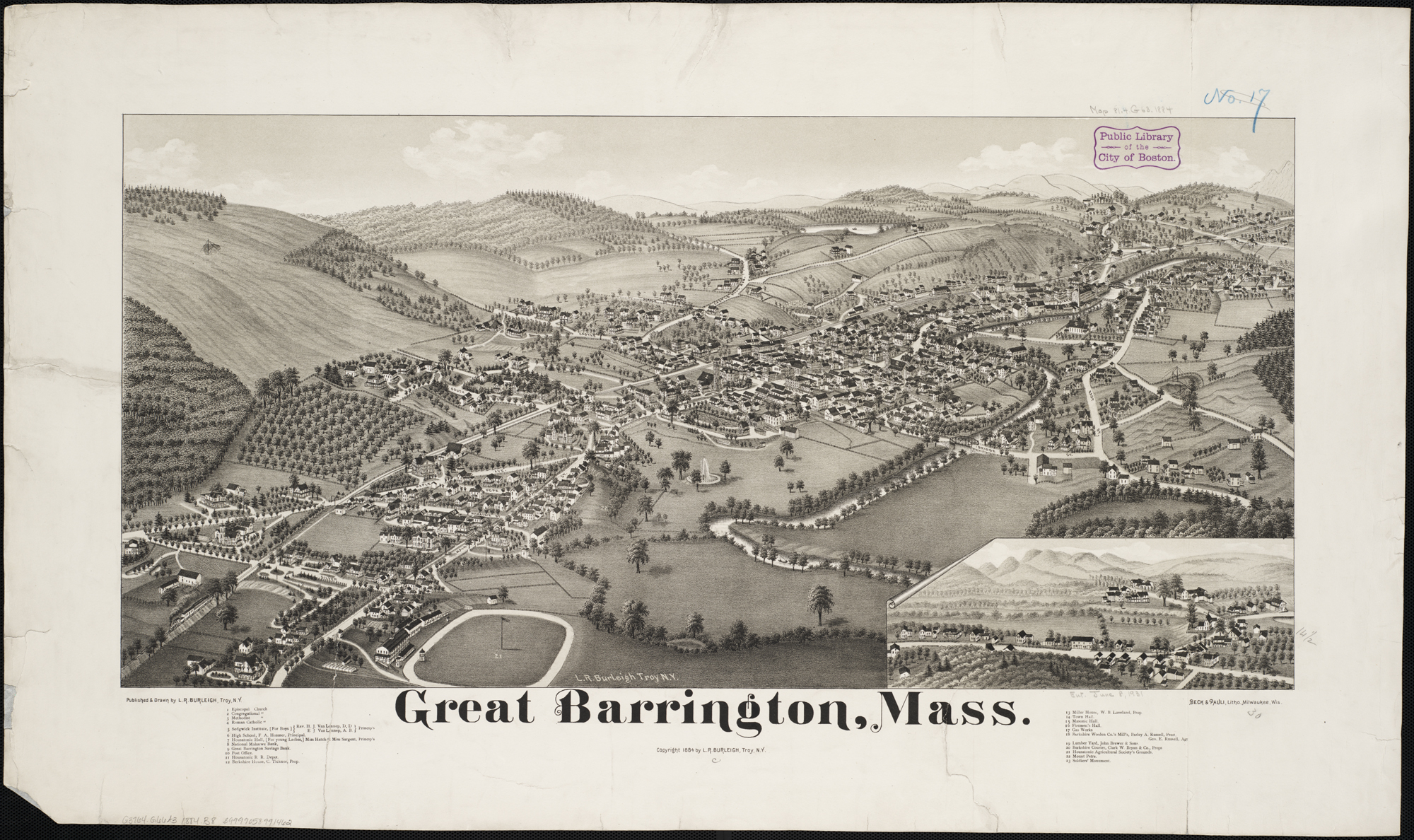
Great Barrington, Massachusetts

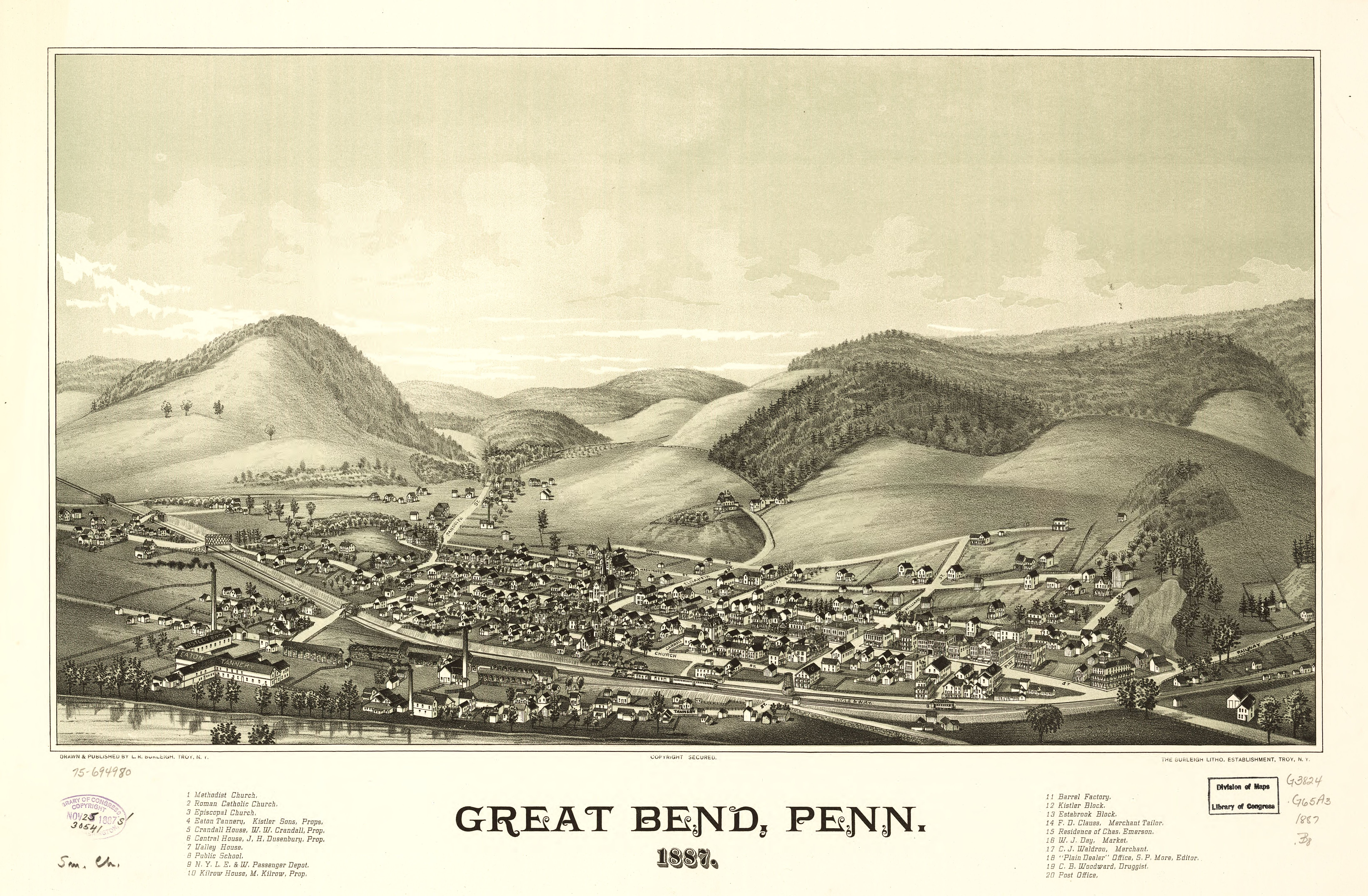
Great Bend, Pennsylvania

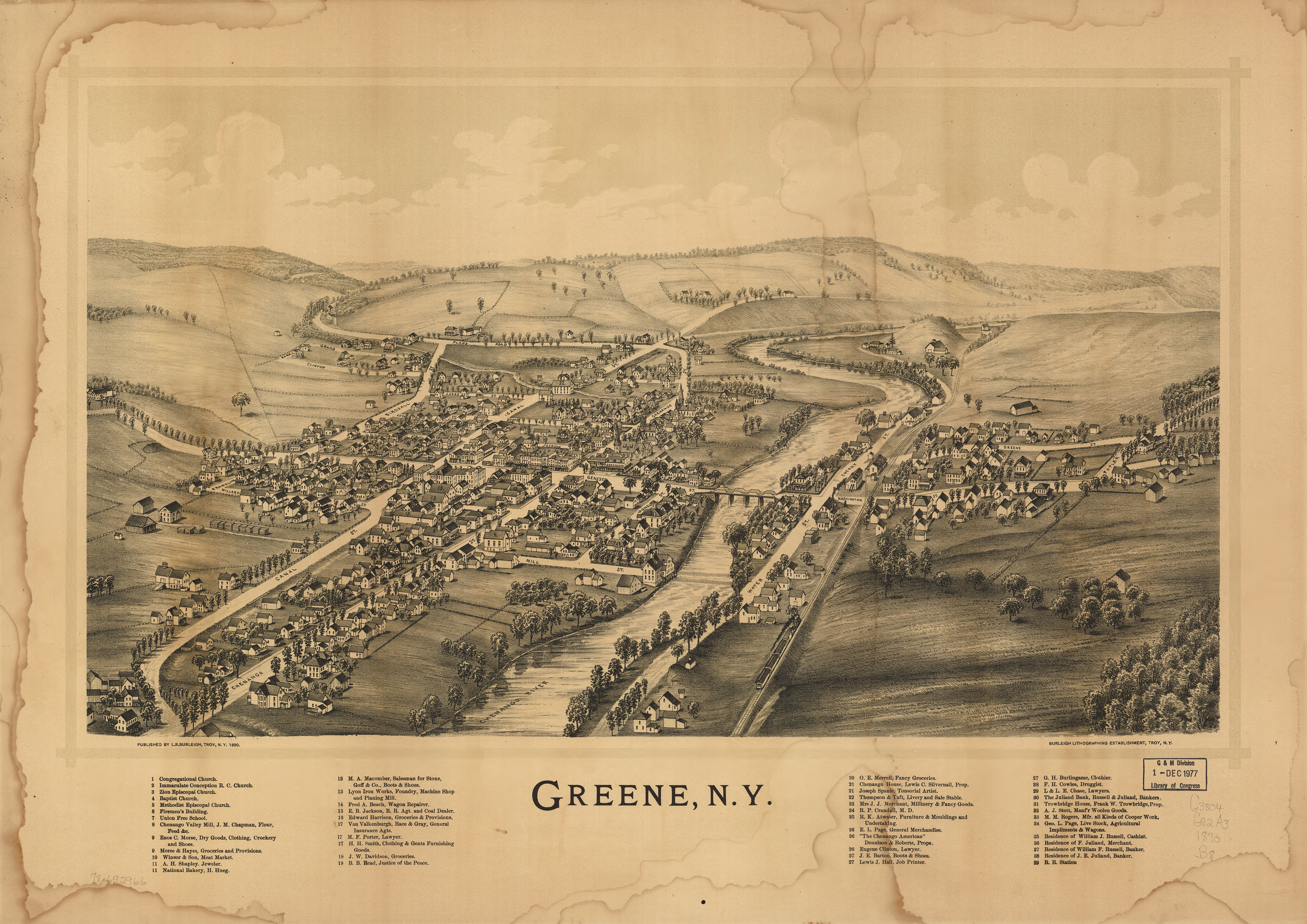
Greene, New York published by L.R. Burleigh

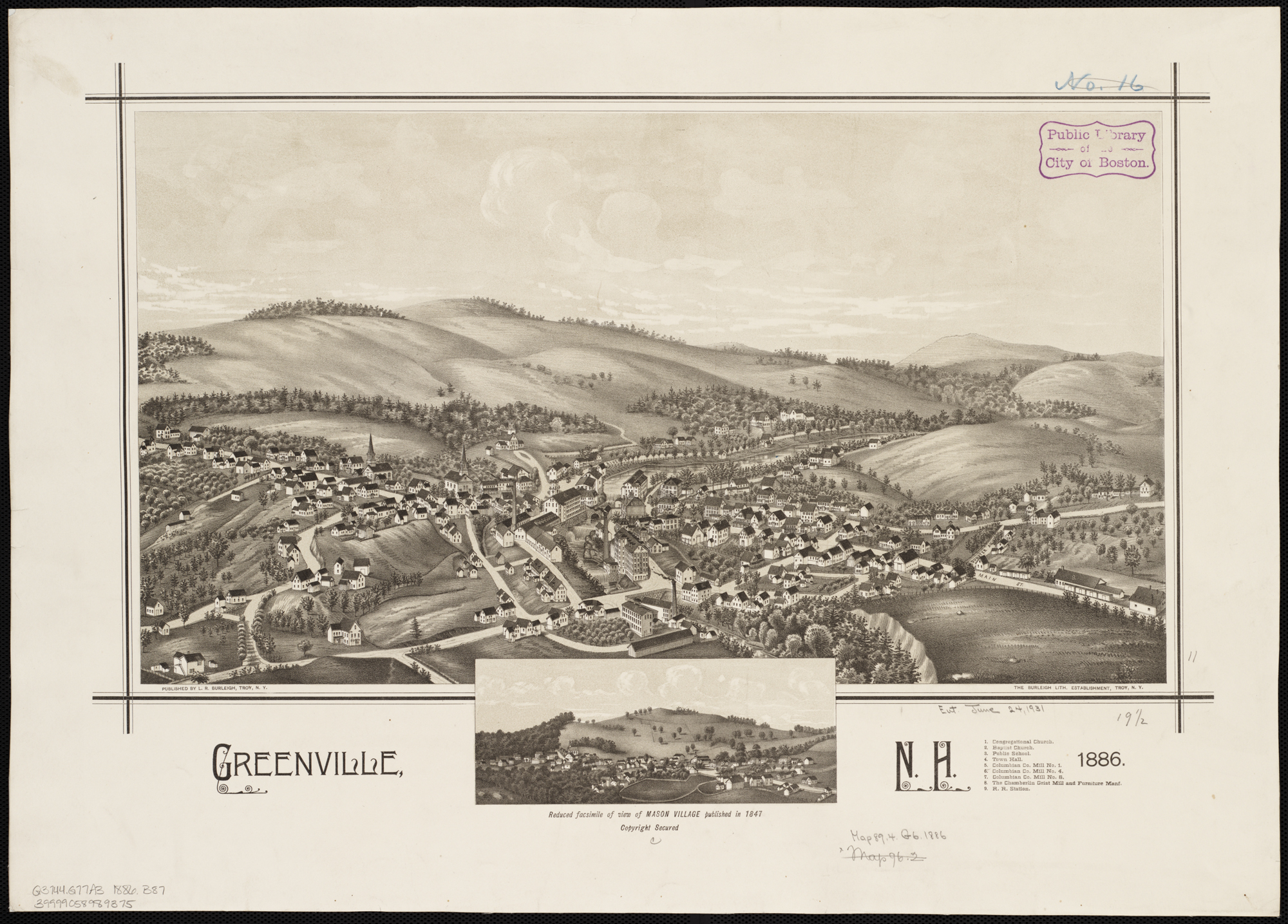
Greenville, New Hampshire

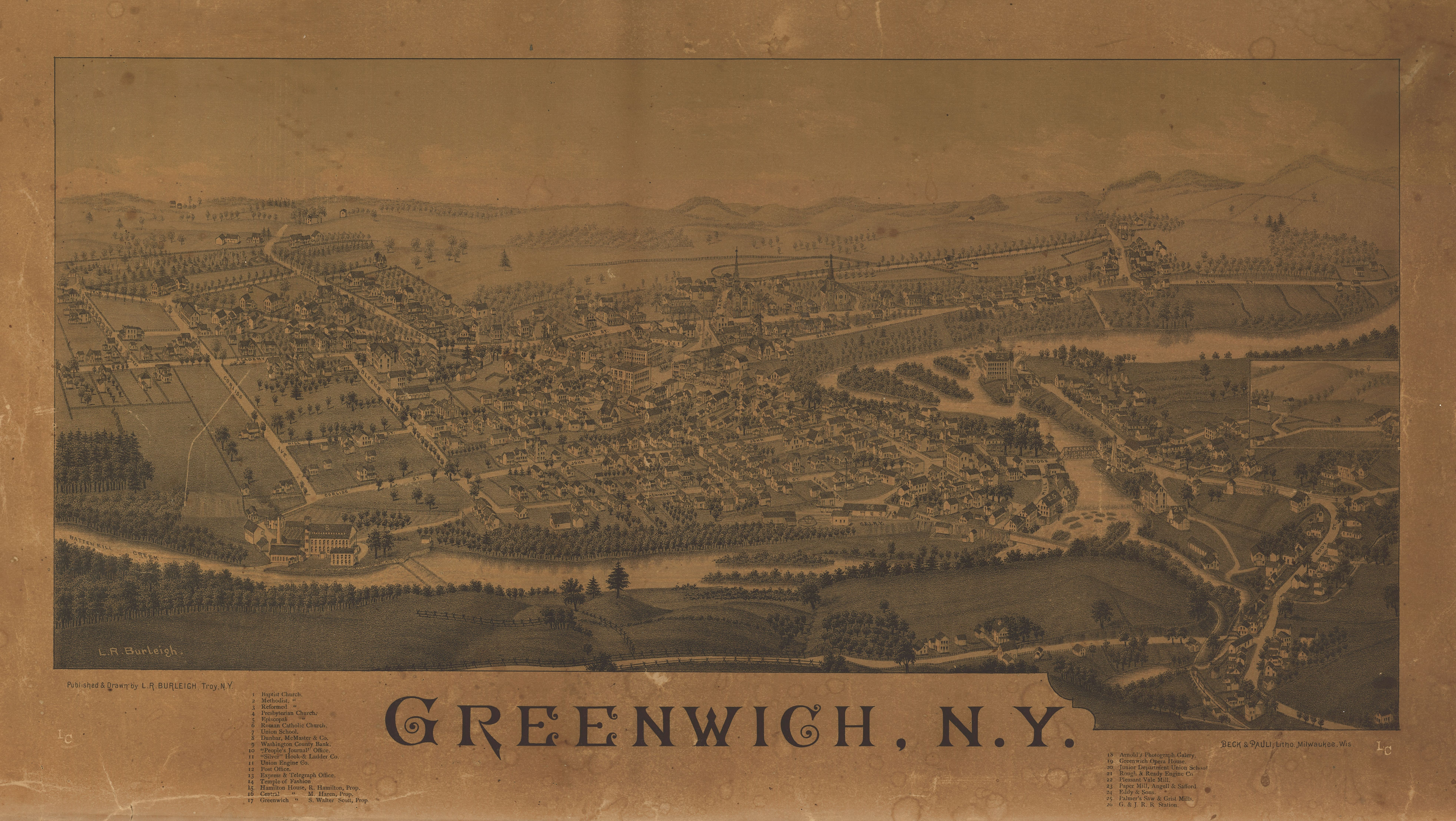
Greenwich (town), New York

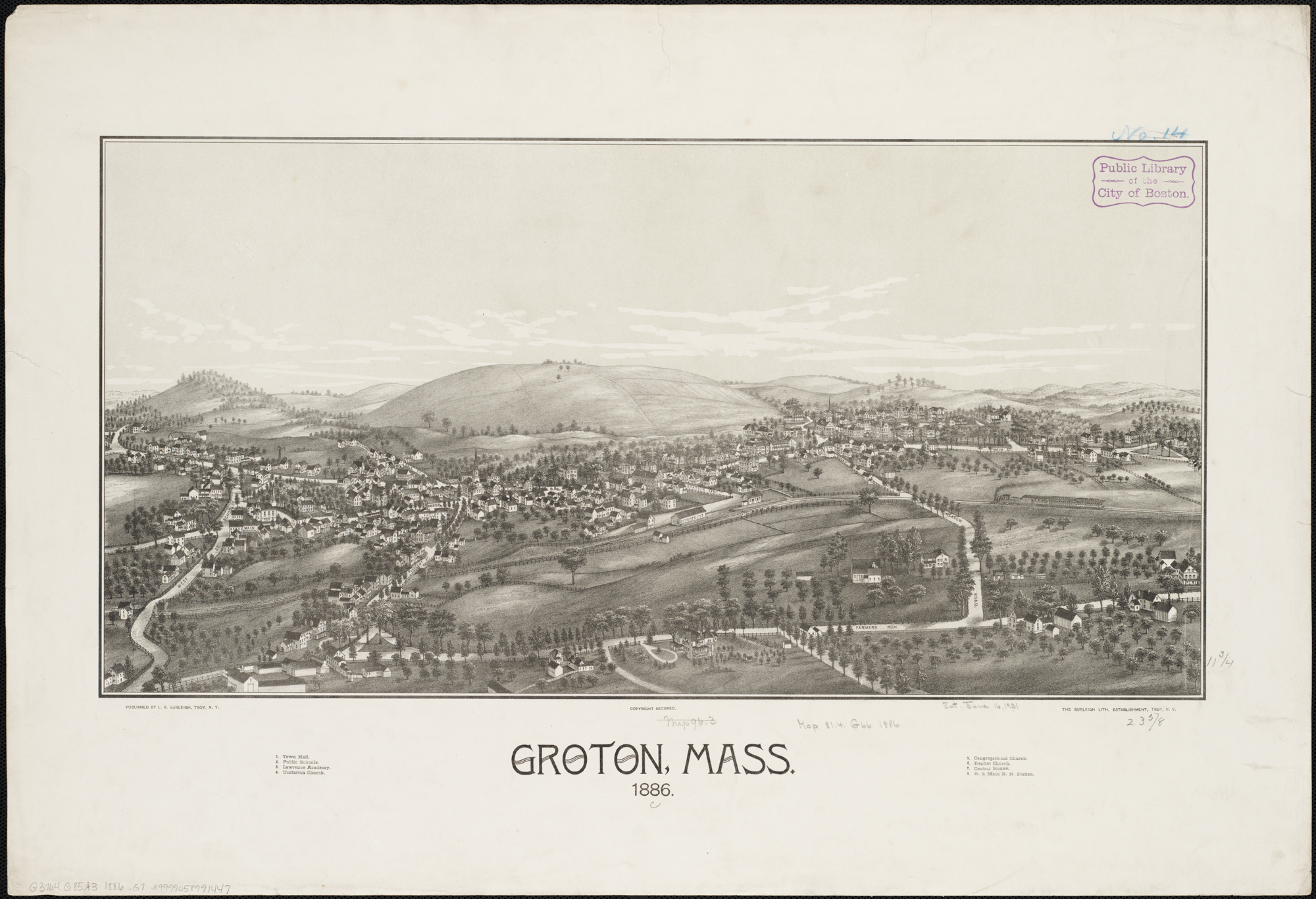
Groton, Massachusetts

Hagamans Mills, New York

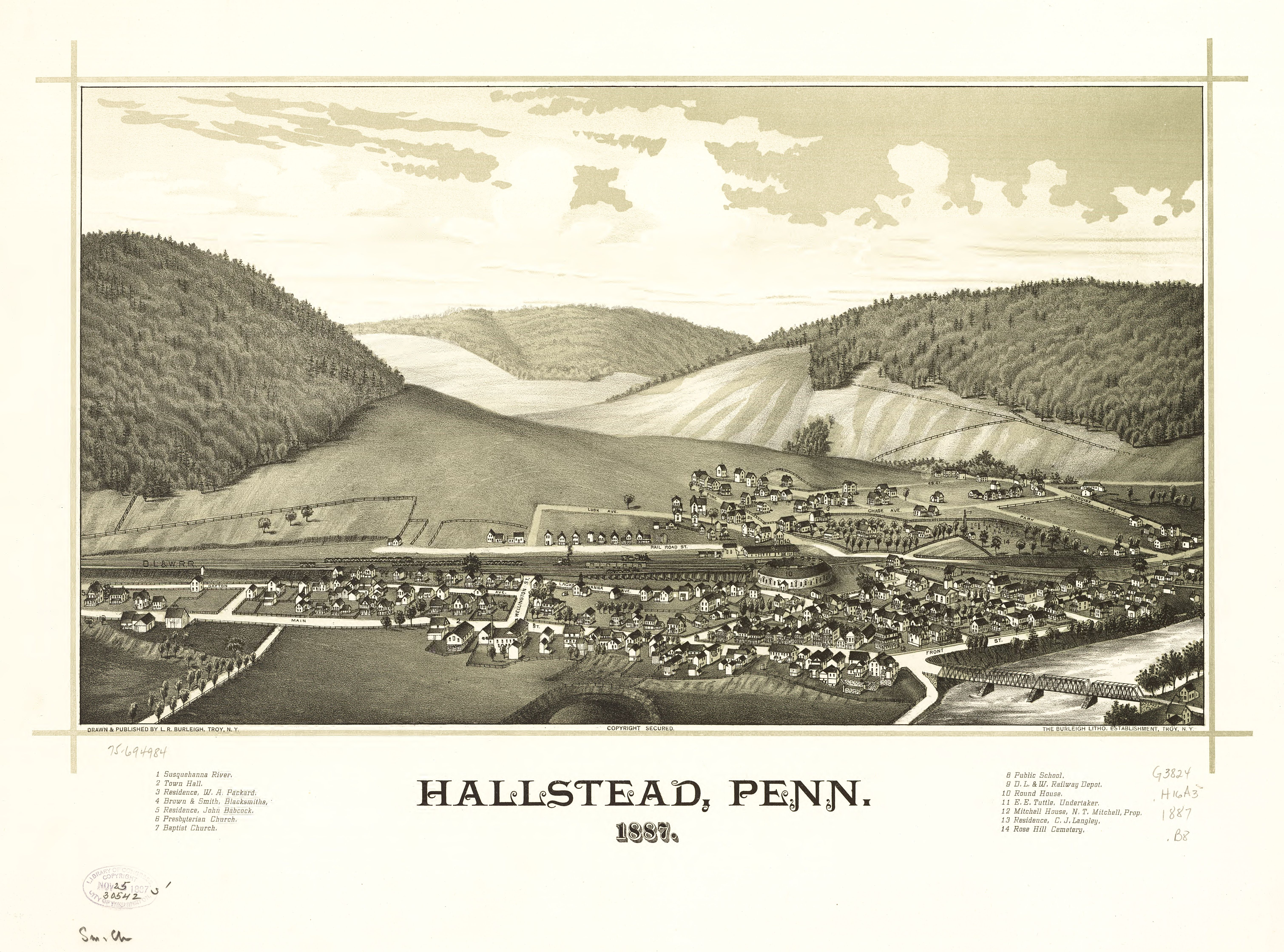
Hallstead, Pennsylvania

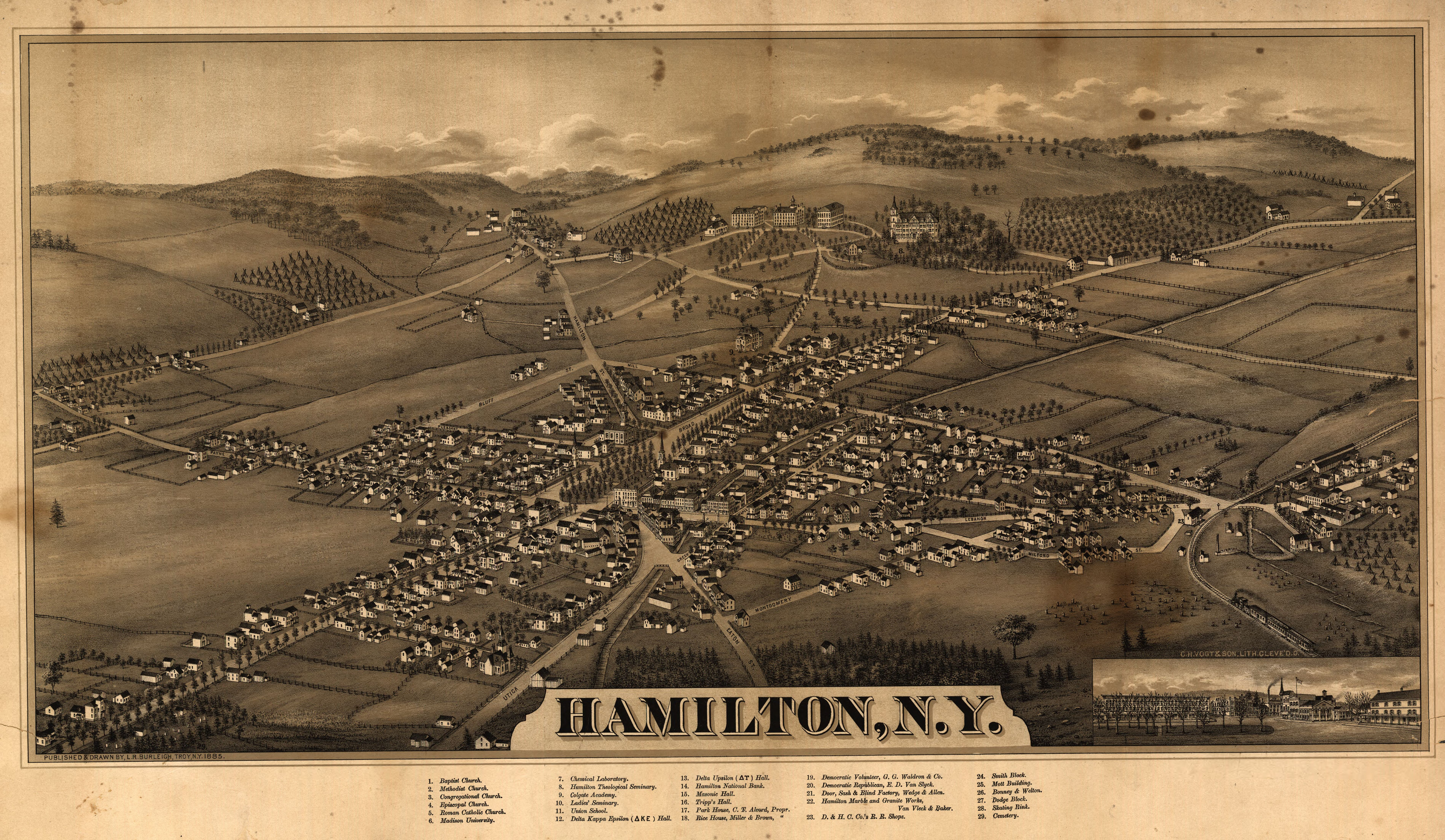
Hamilton, New York

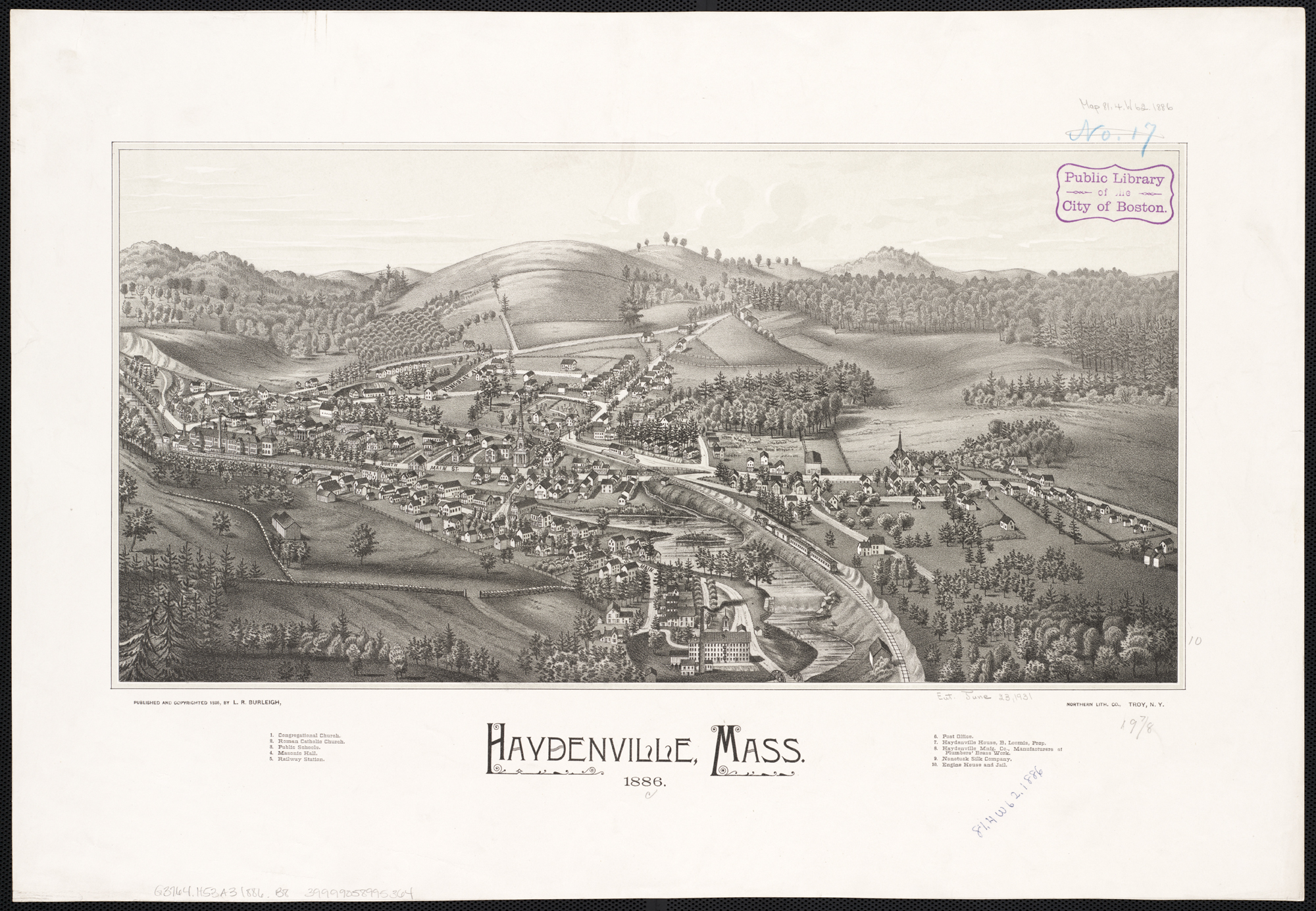
Haydenville, Massachusetts

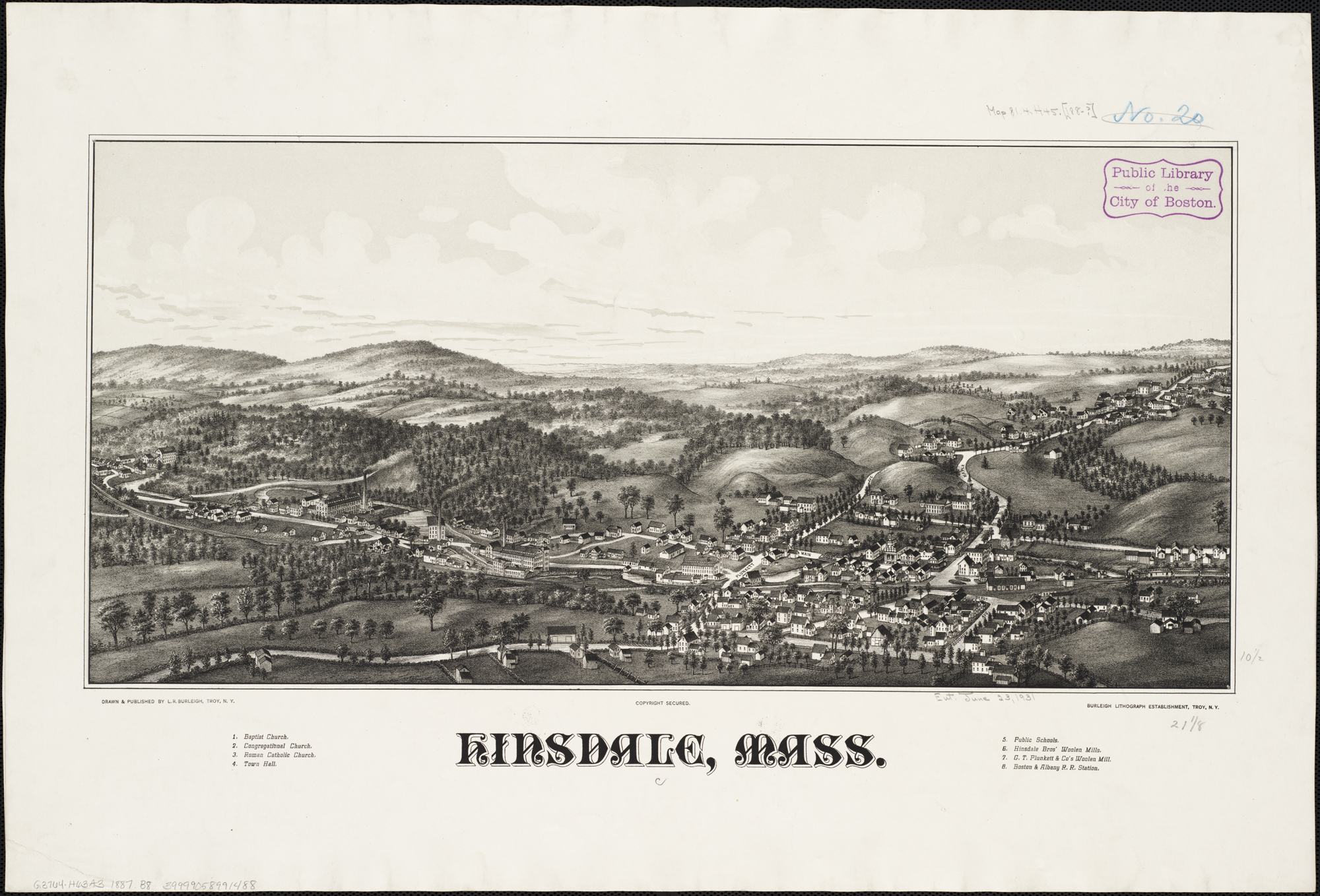
Hinsdale, Massachusetts

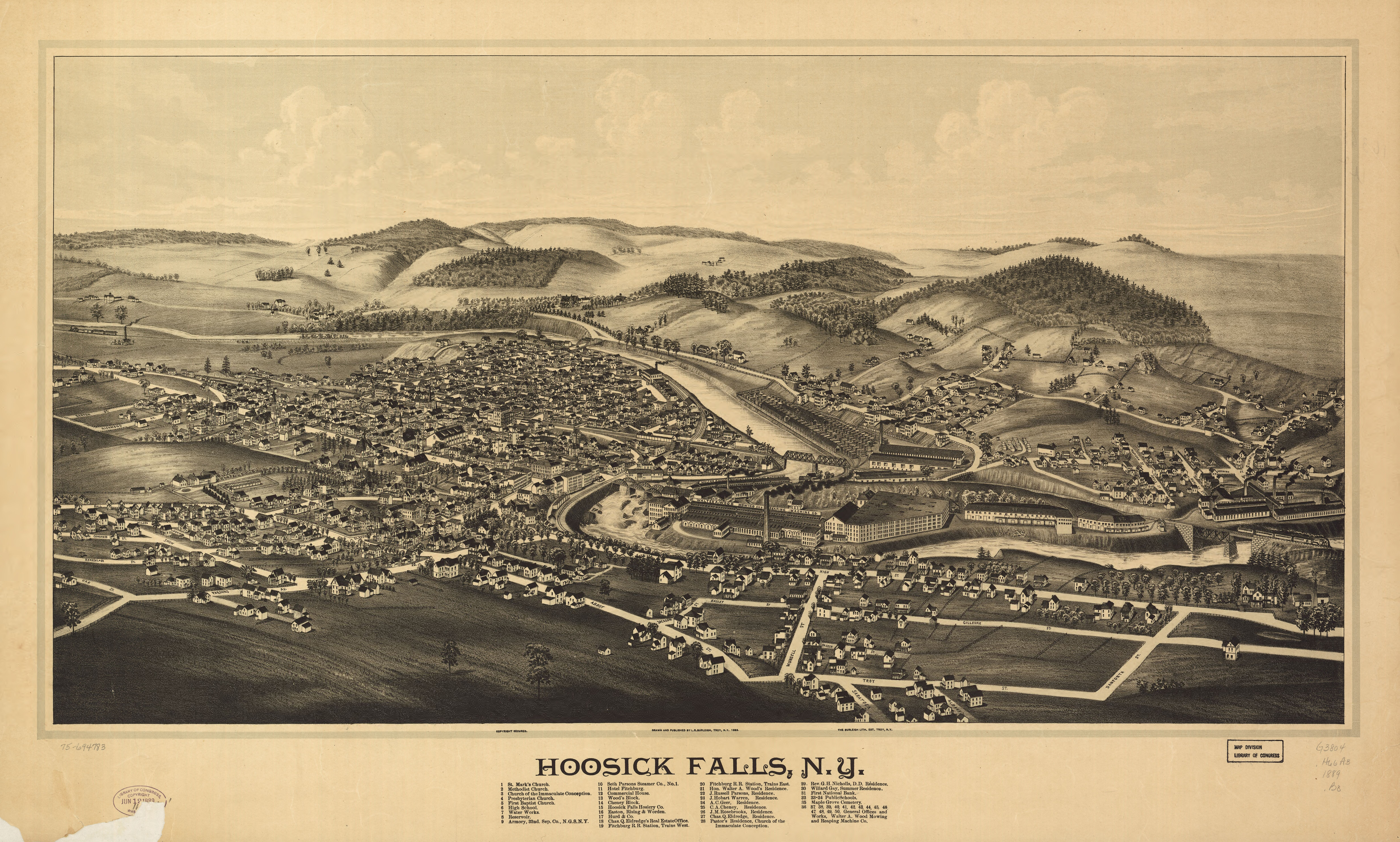
Hoosick Falls, New York

Housatonic, Massachusetts

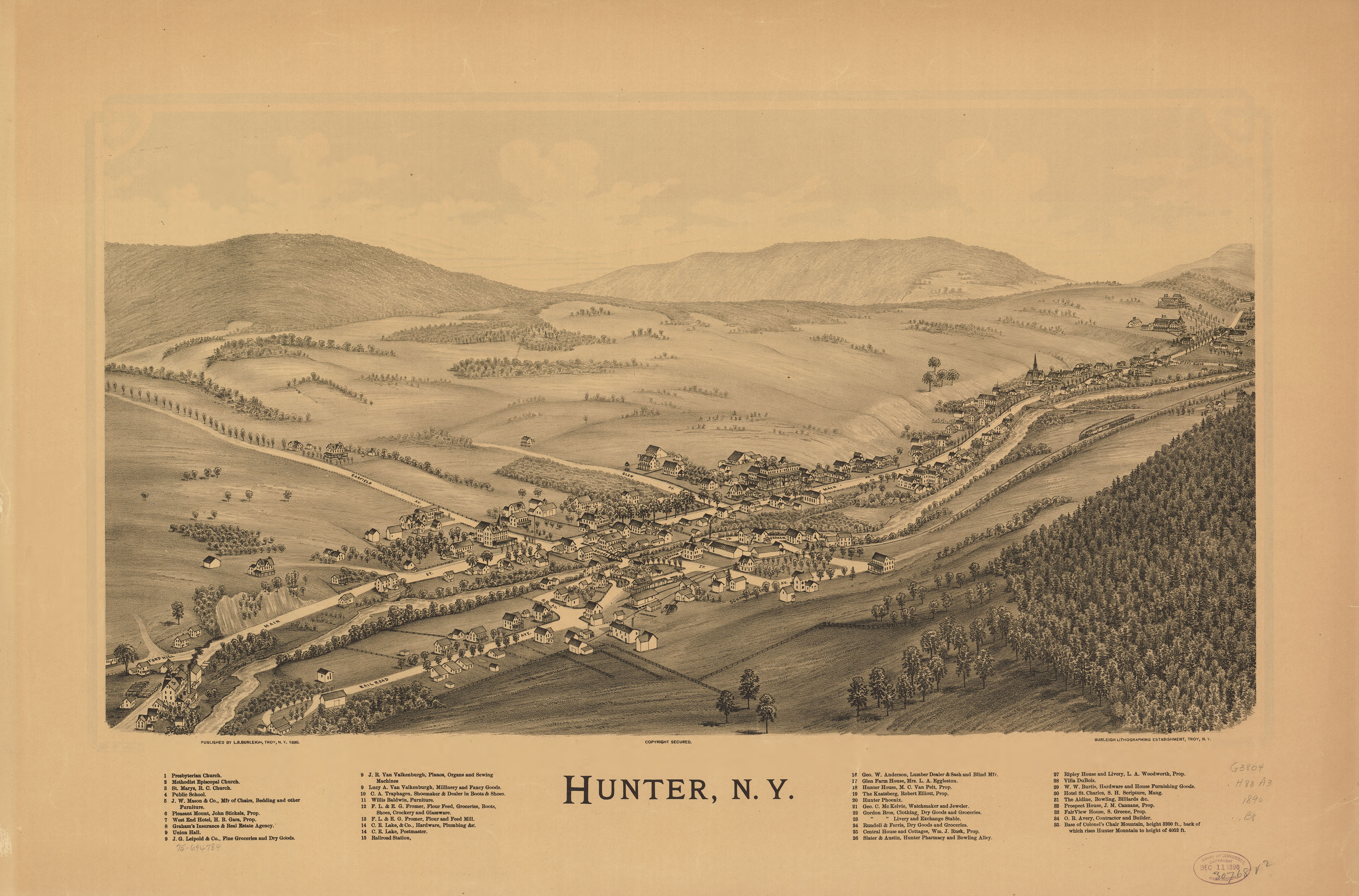
Hunter, New York

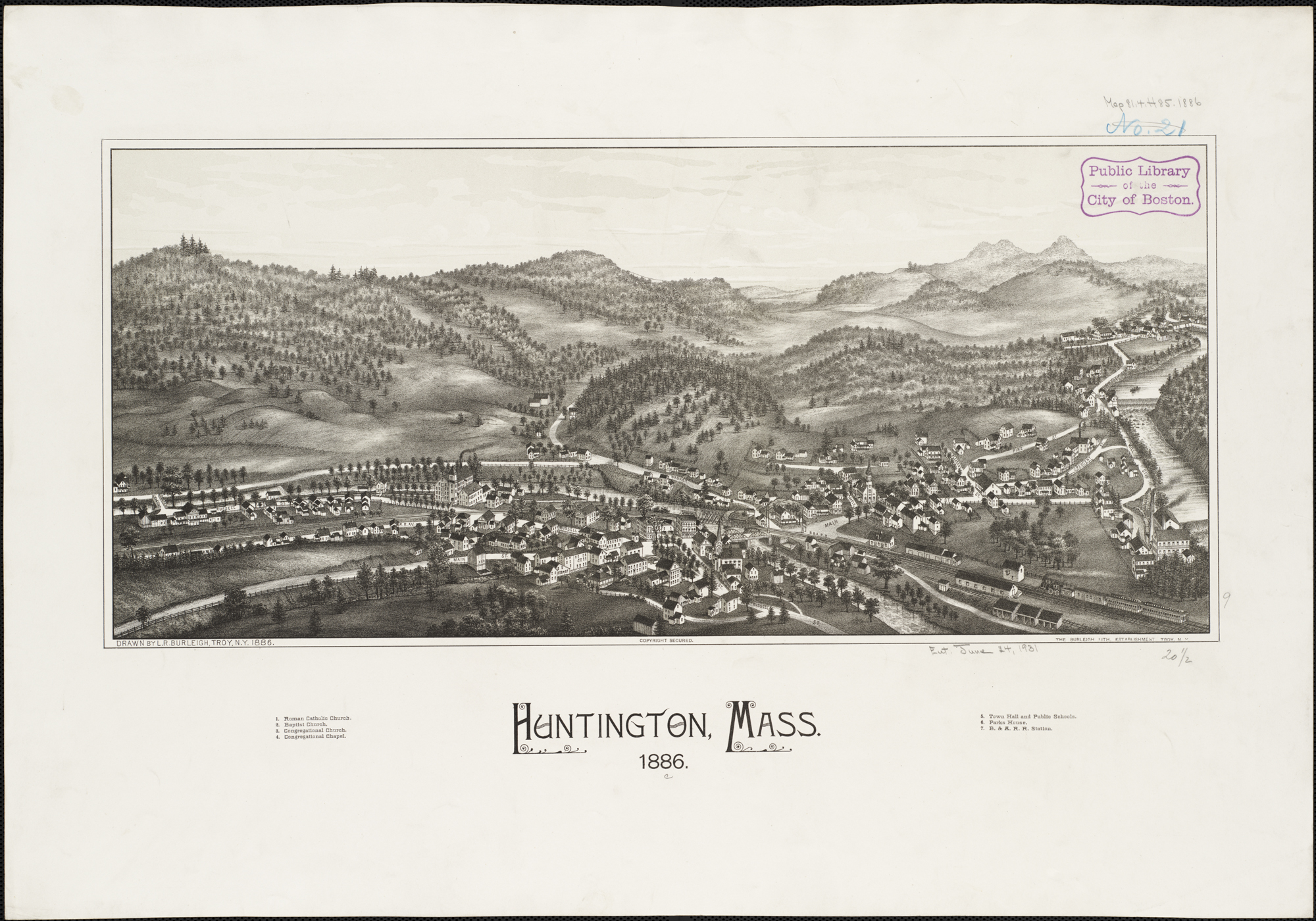
Huntington, Massachusetts

Ithaca, New York by J. Lyth

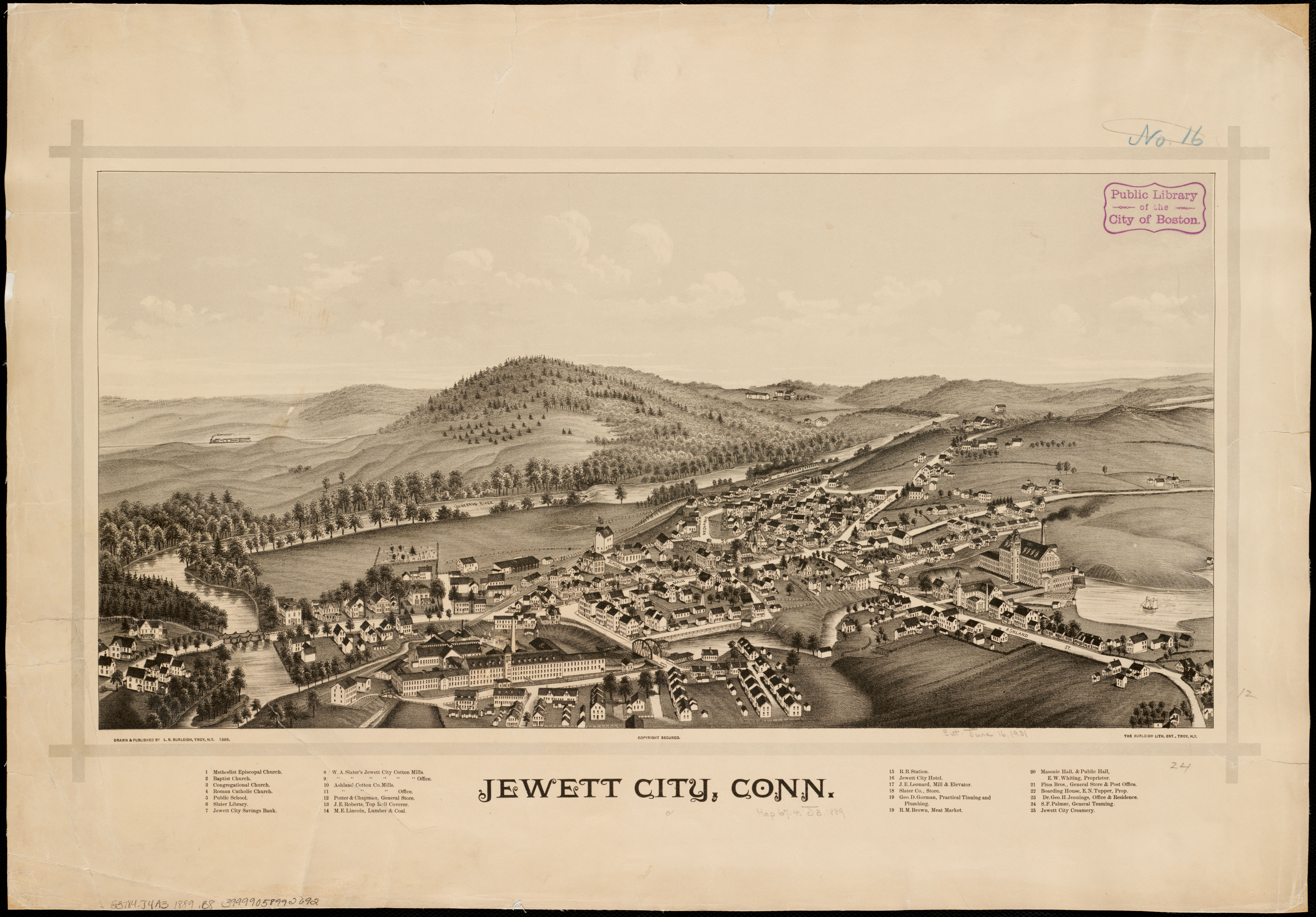
Jewett City, Connecticut

Johnsonville, New York

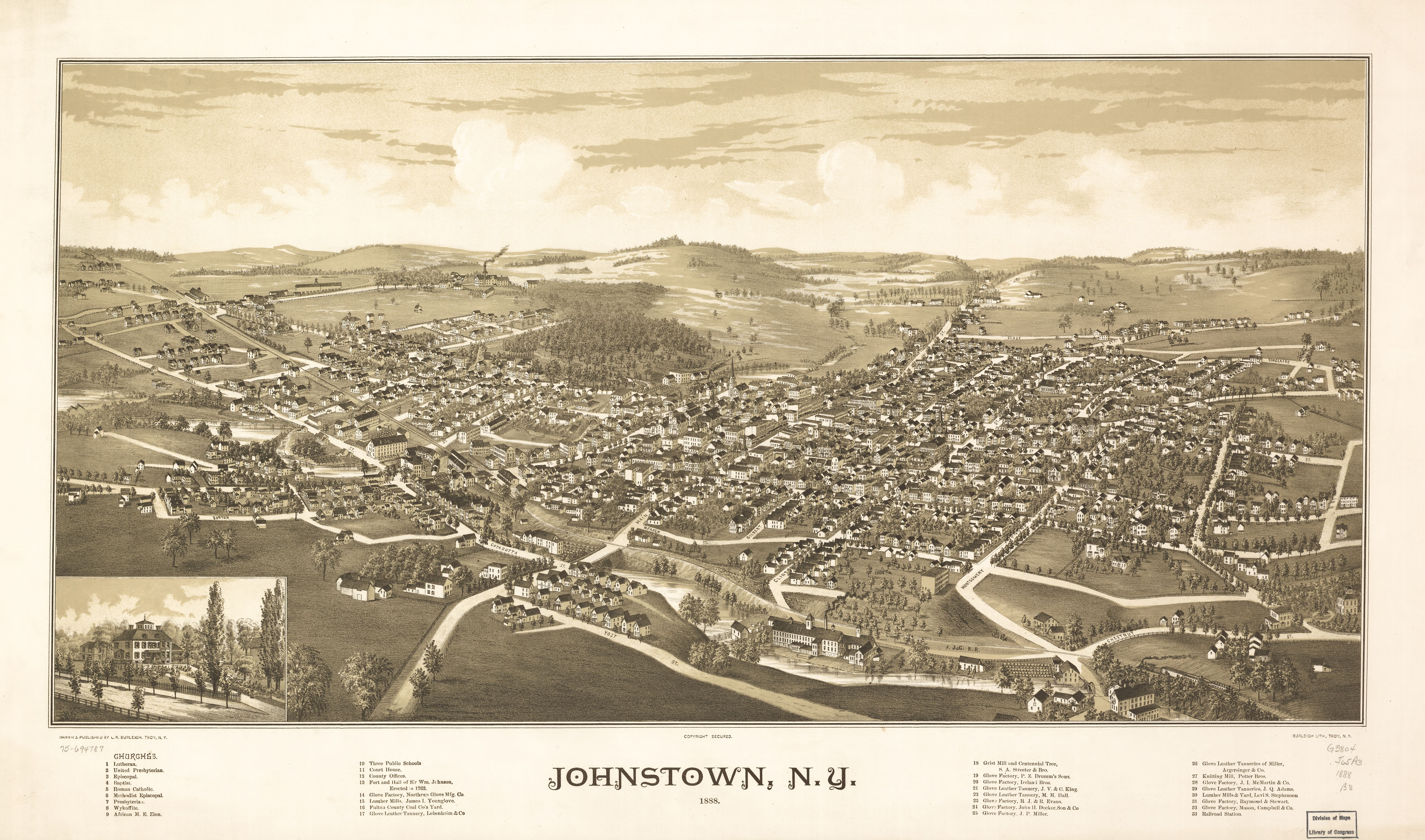
Johnstown, New York

Keeseville, New York

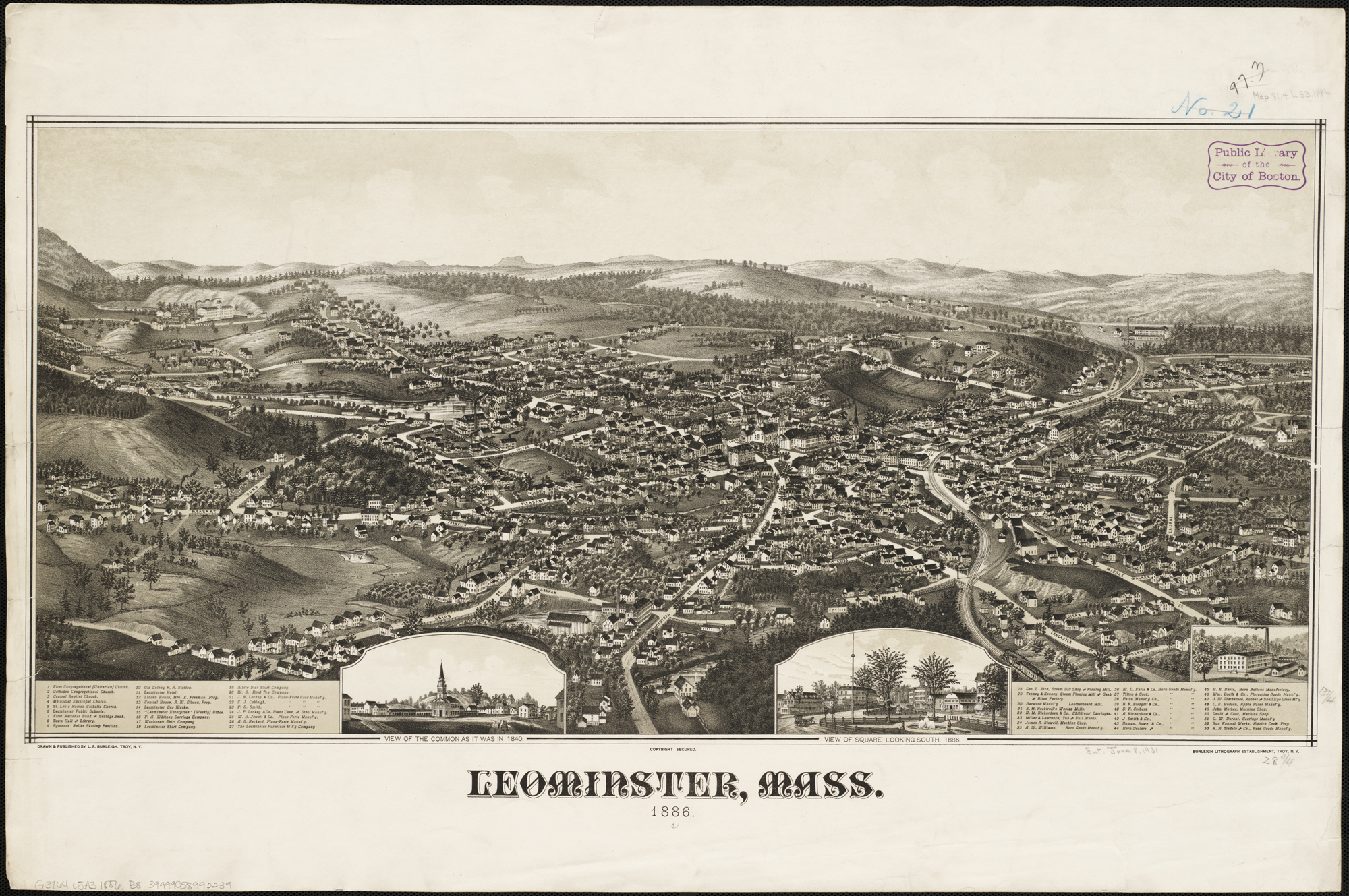
Leominster, Massachusetts

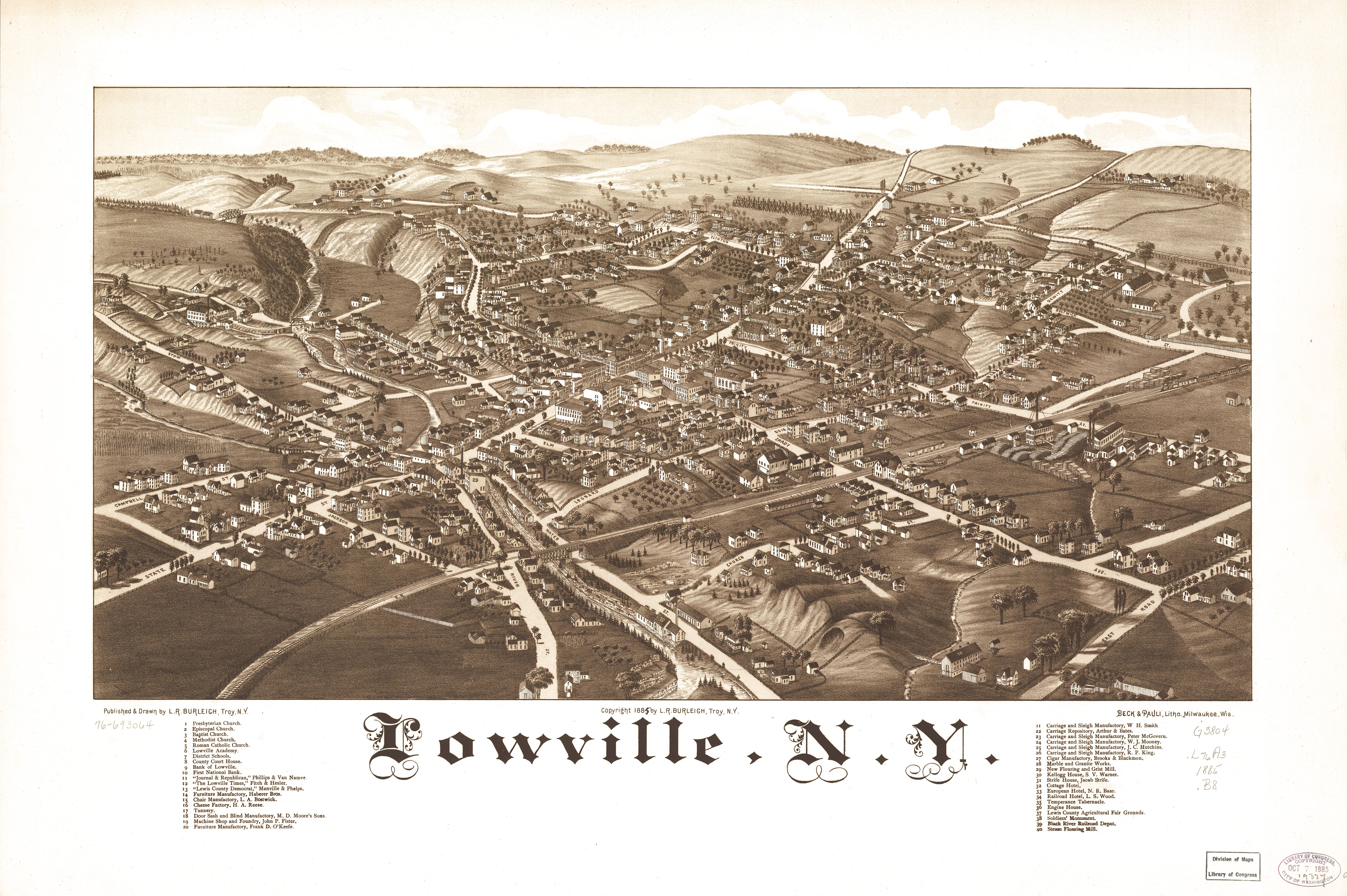
Lowville, New York

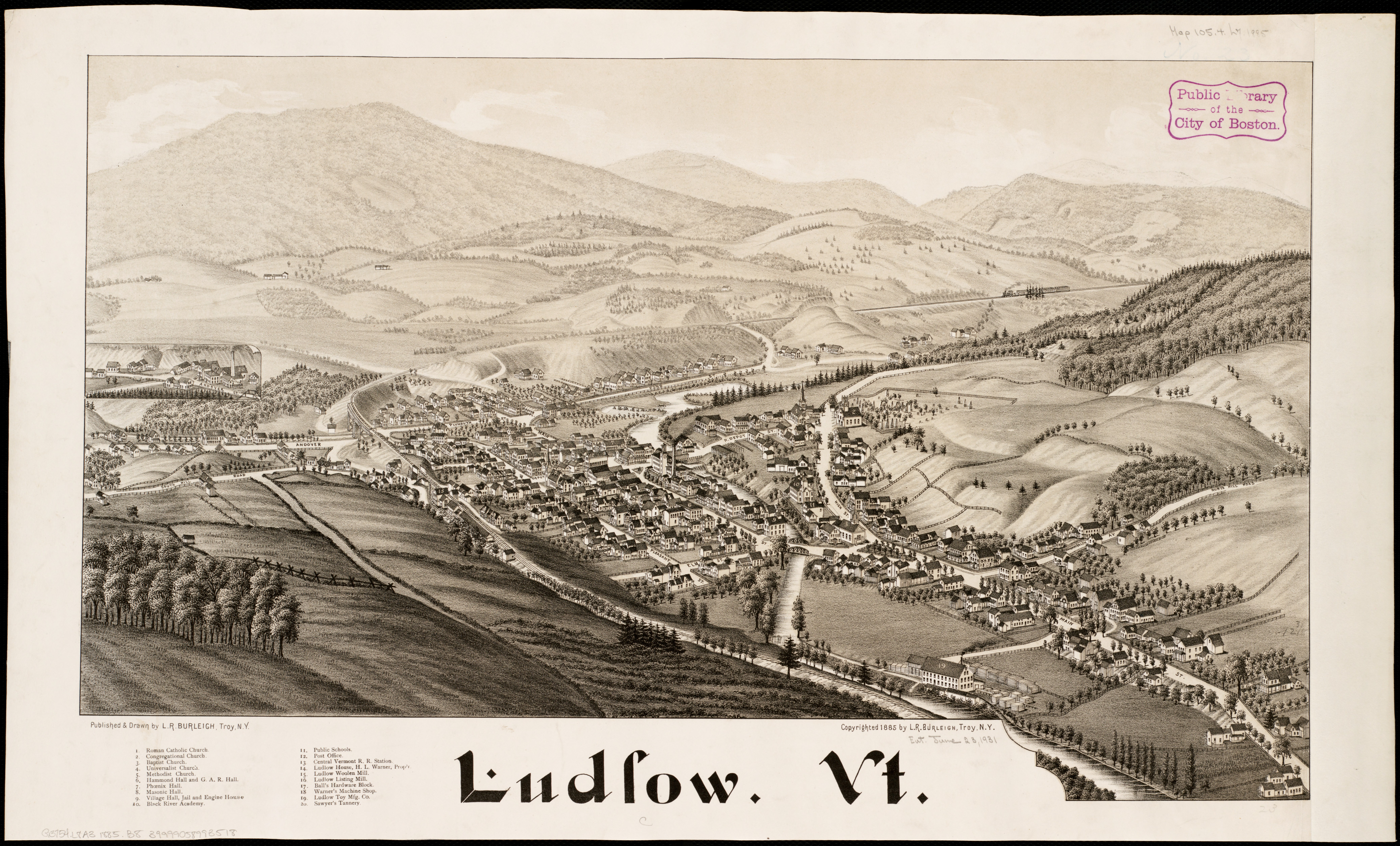
Ludlow, Vermont

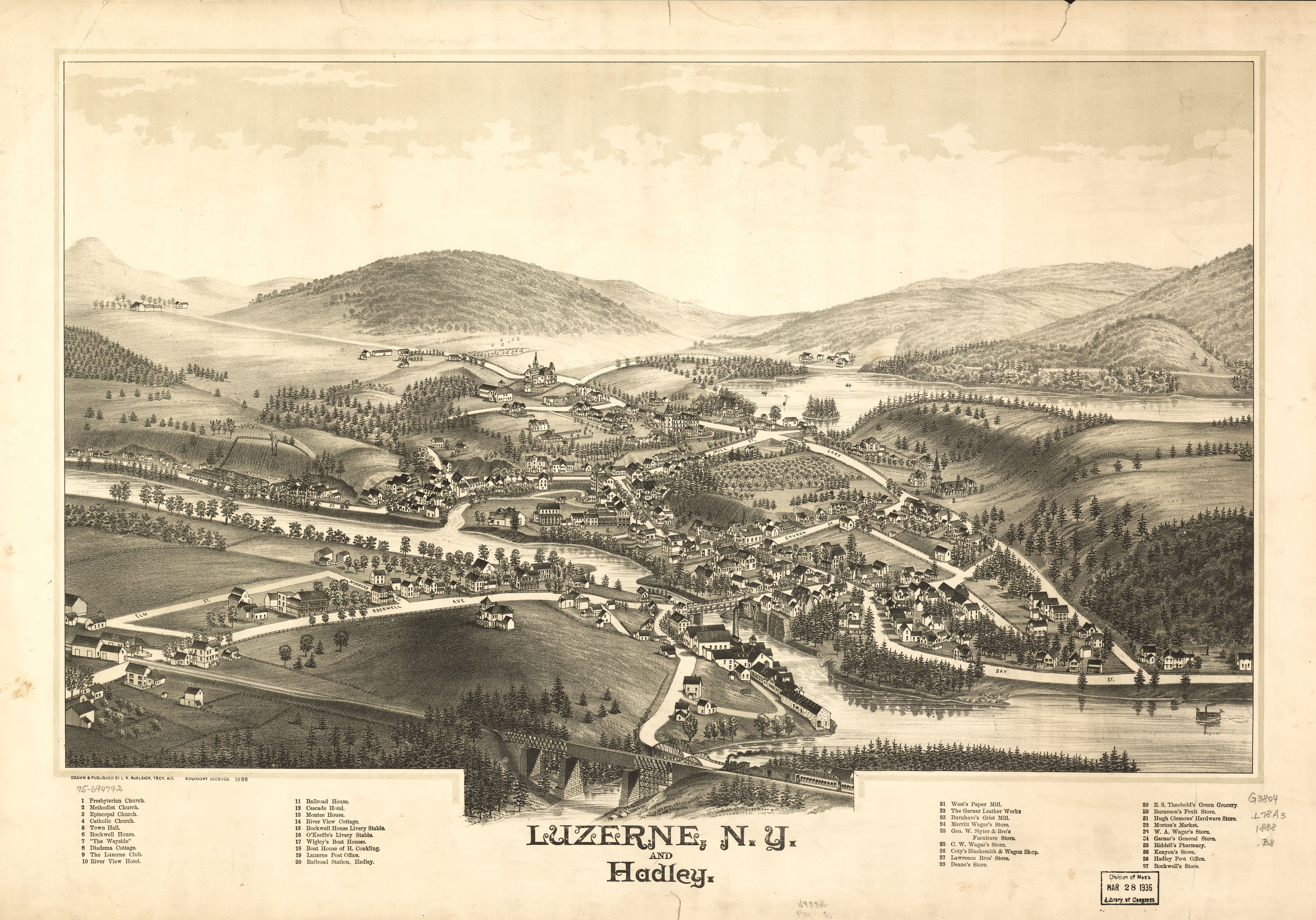
Luzerne, New York and Hadley, New York

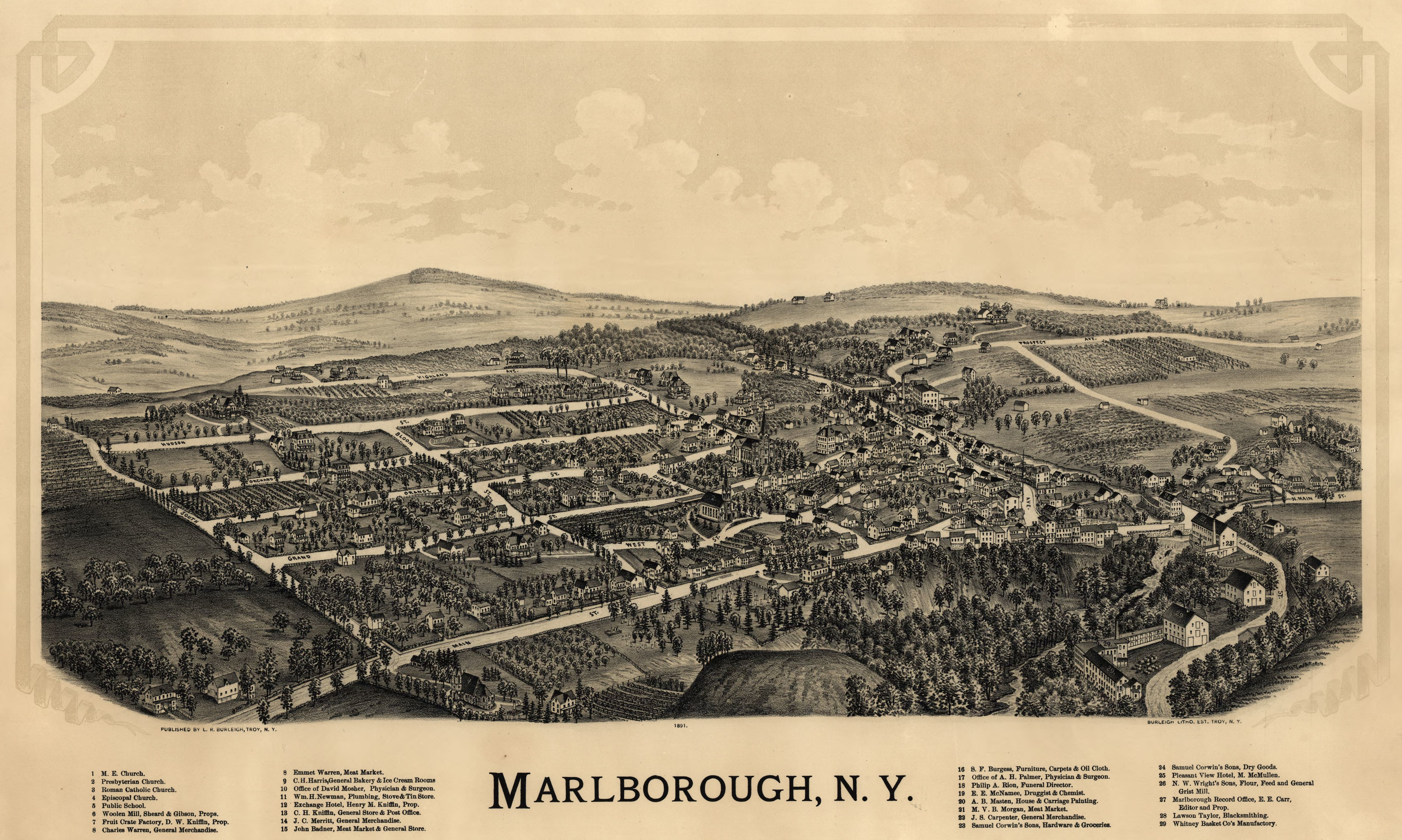
Marlborough, New York

Malone, New York

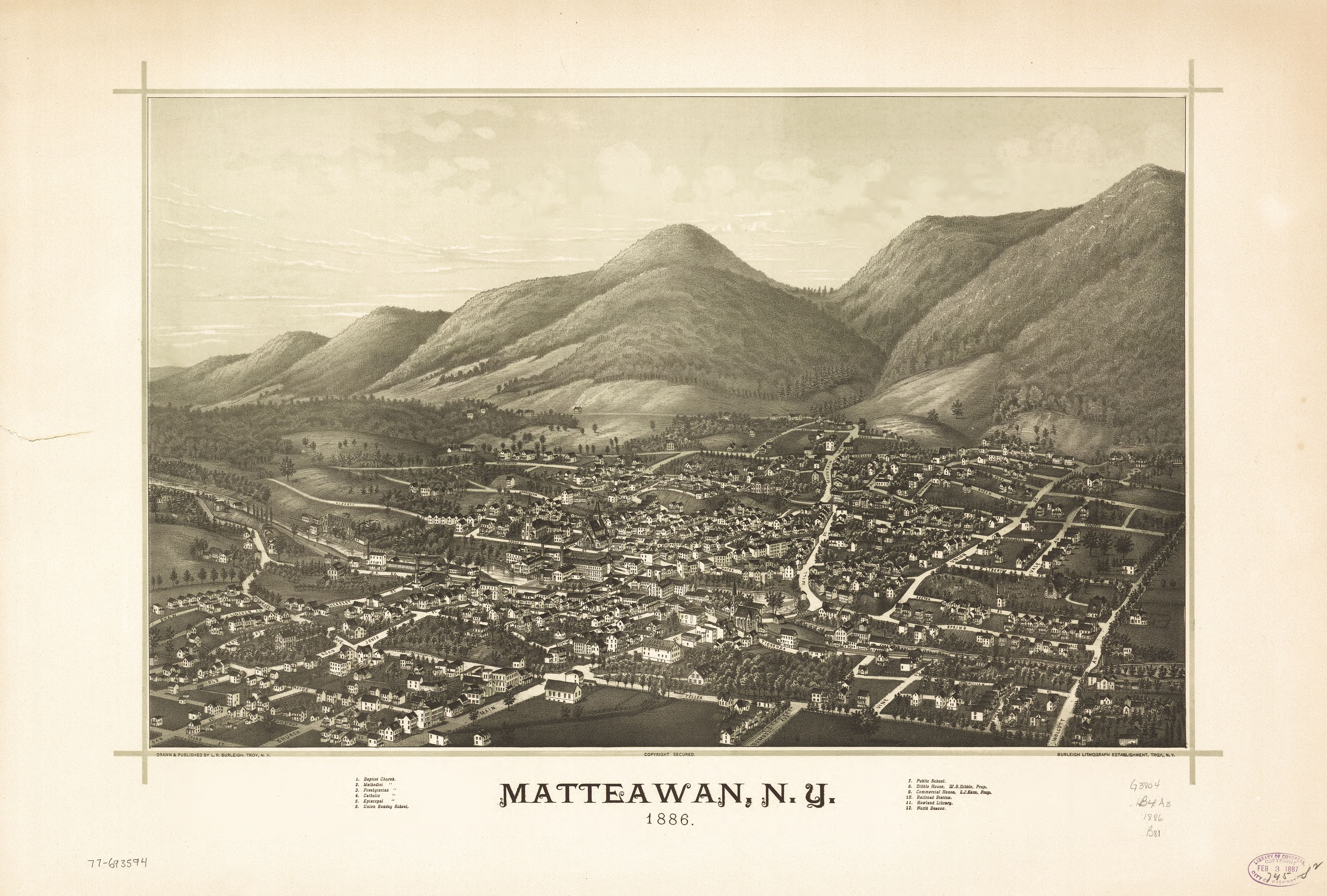
Matteawan, New York

Mechanicville, New York

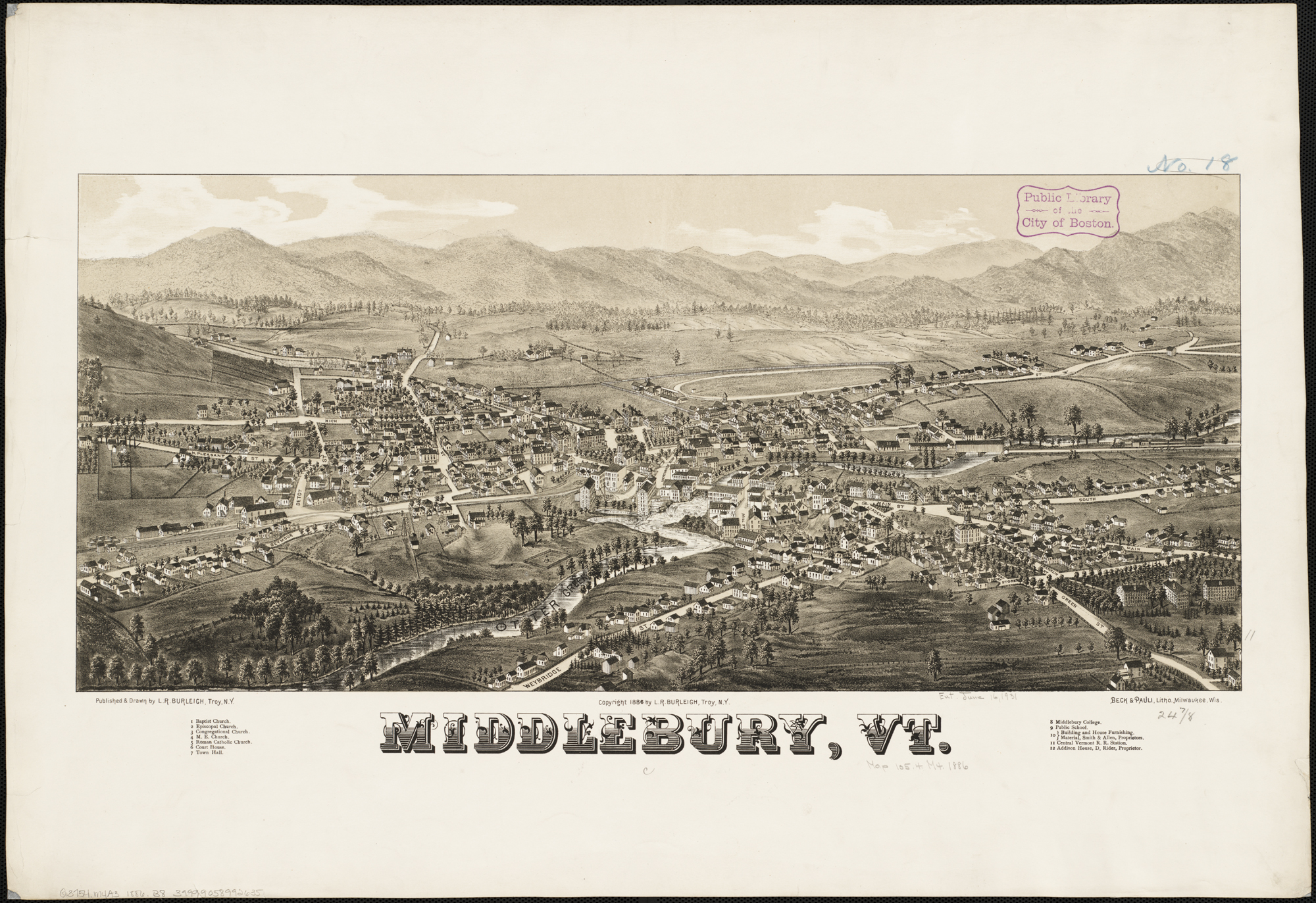
Middlebury, Vermont

Middleville, New York

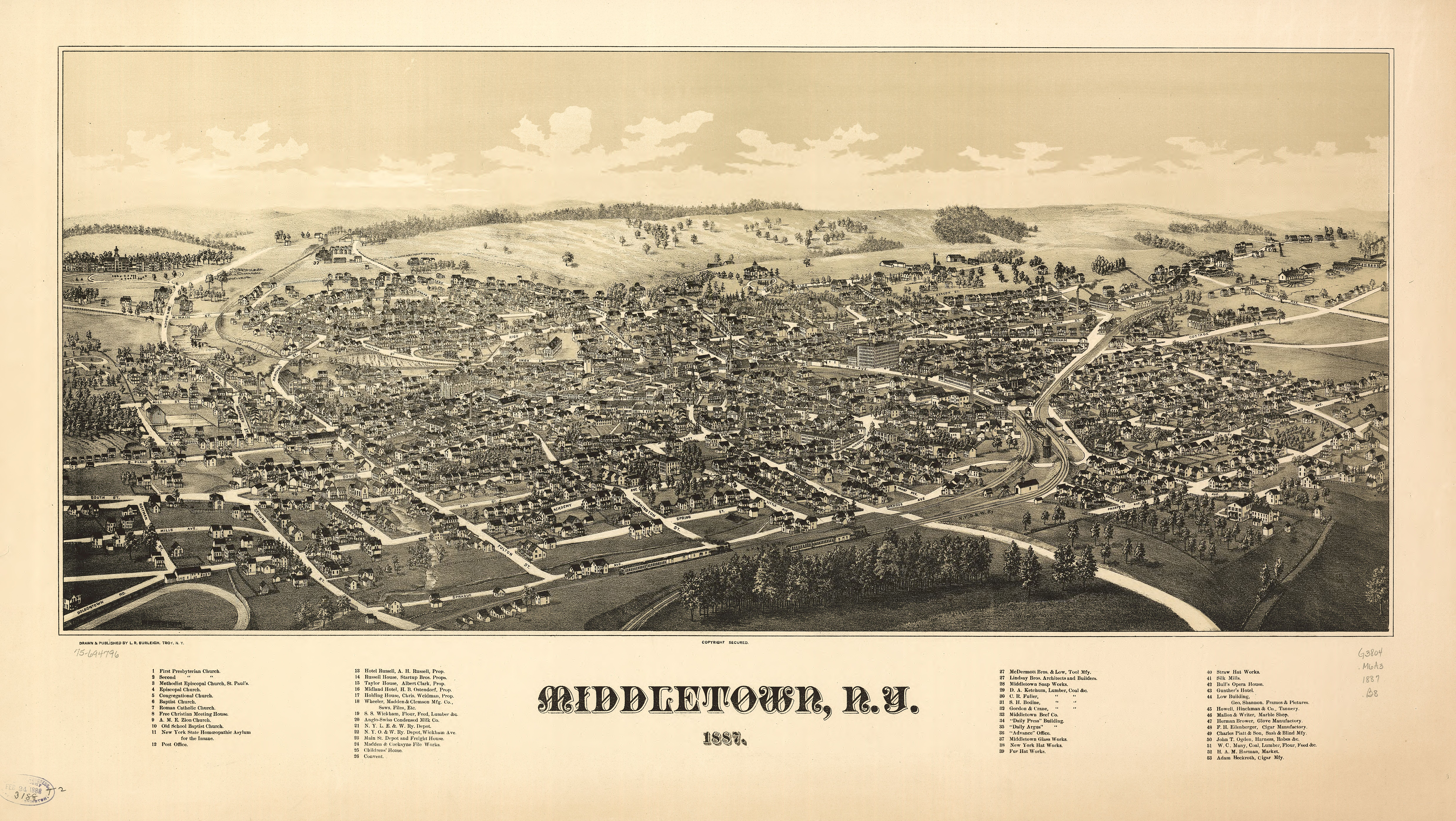
Middletown, New York

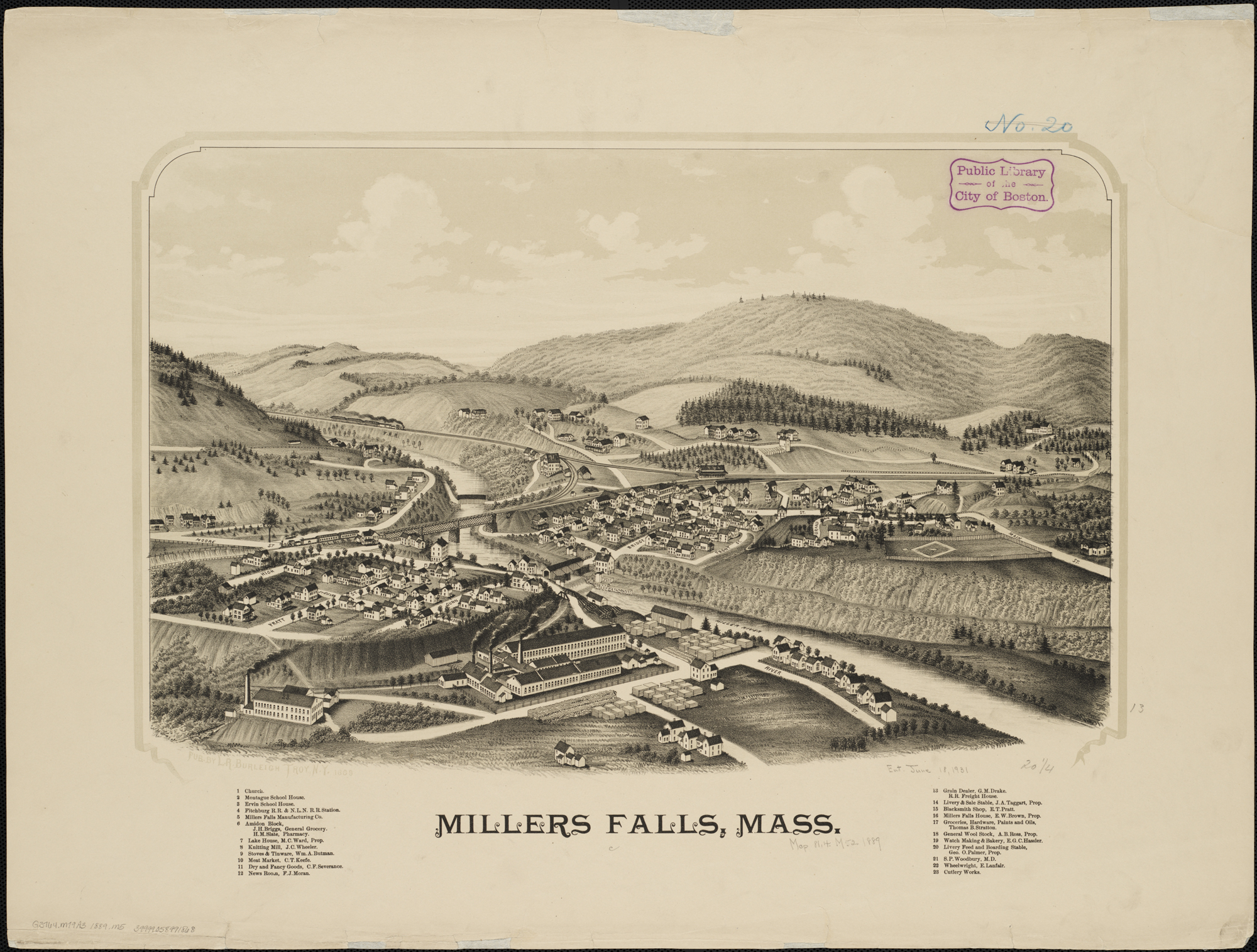
Miller's Falls, Massachusetts

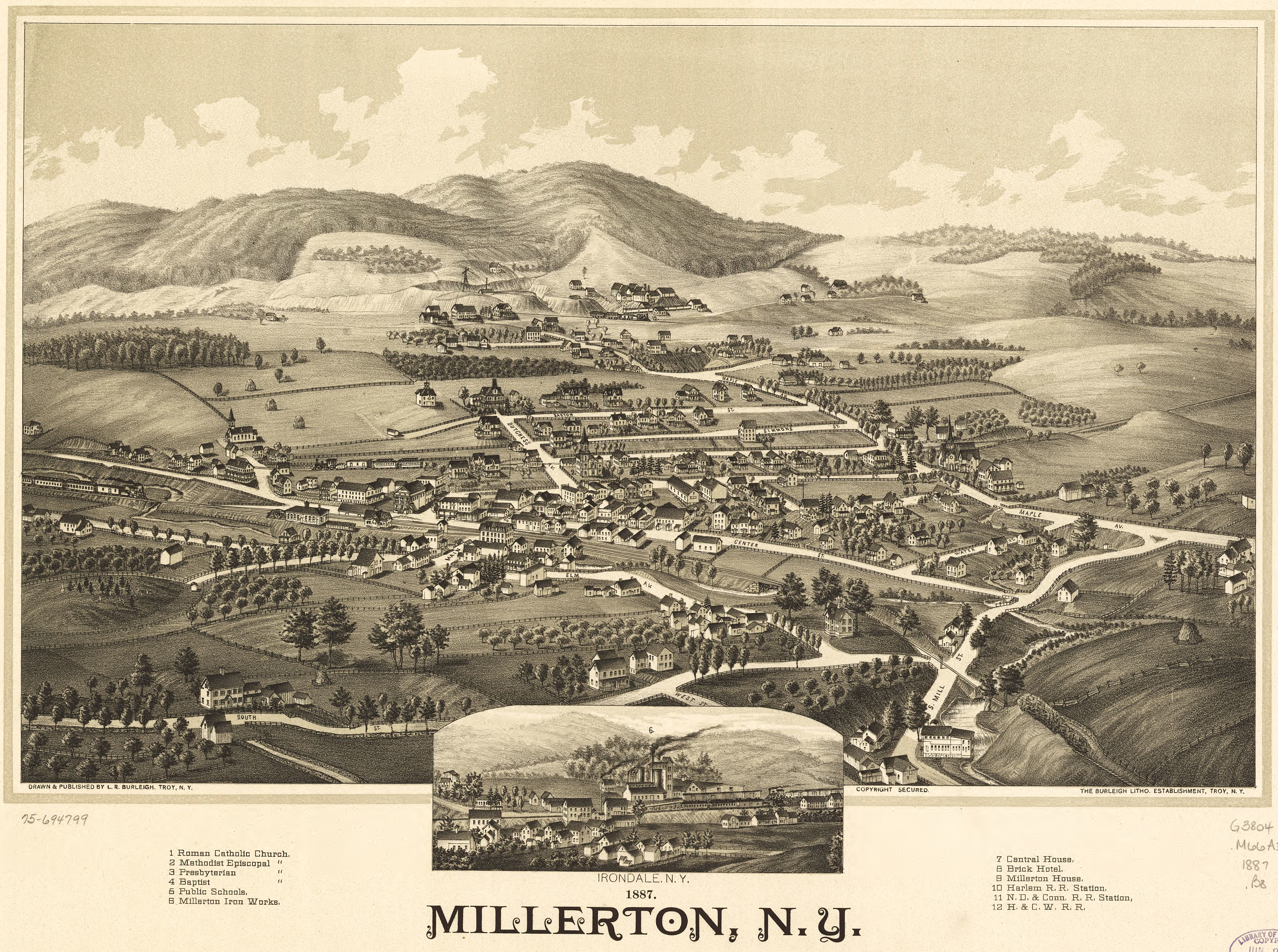
Millerton, New York with inset of Irondale, New York

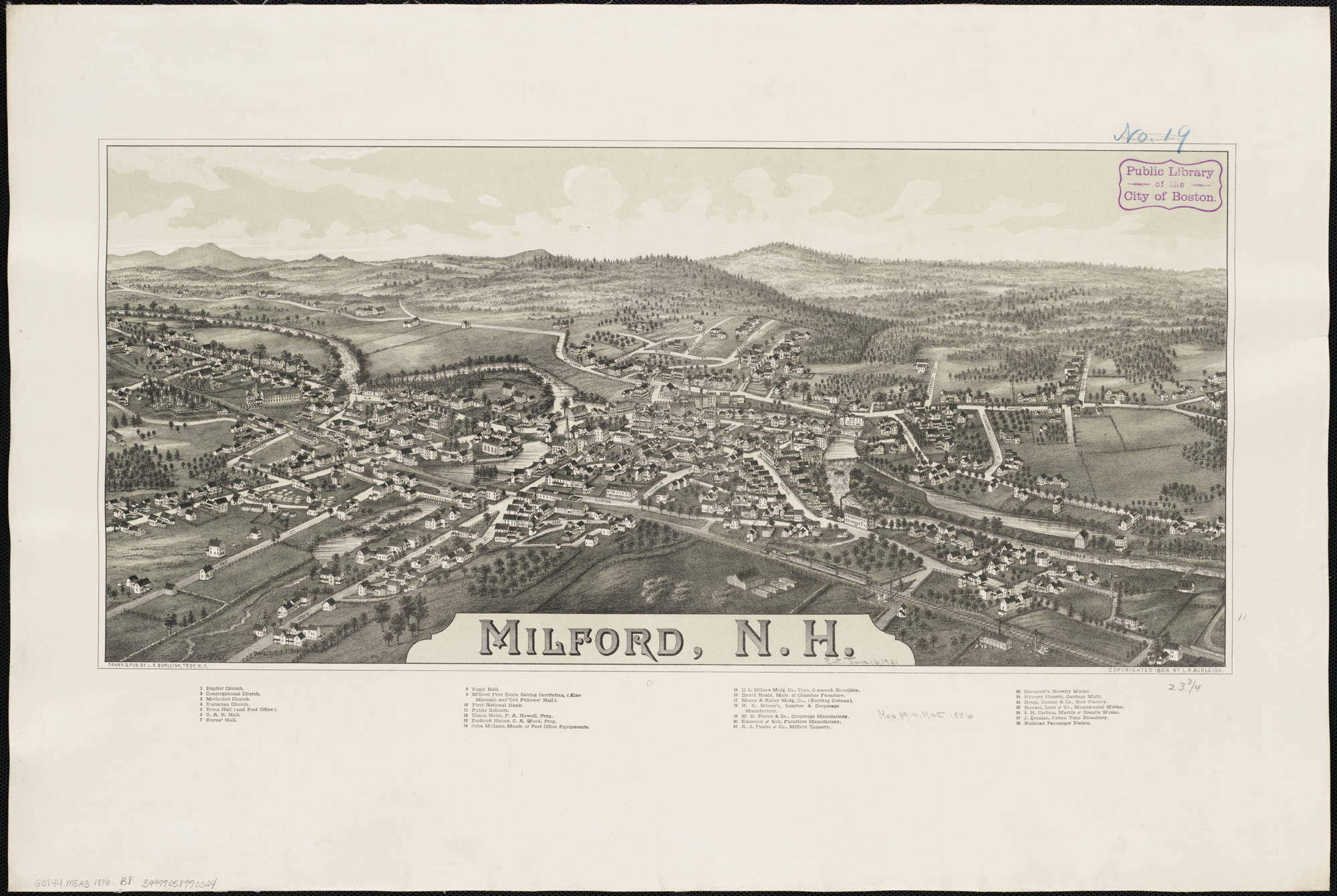
Milford, New Hampshire

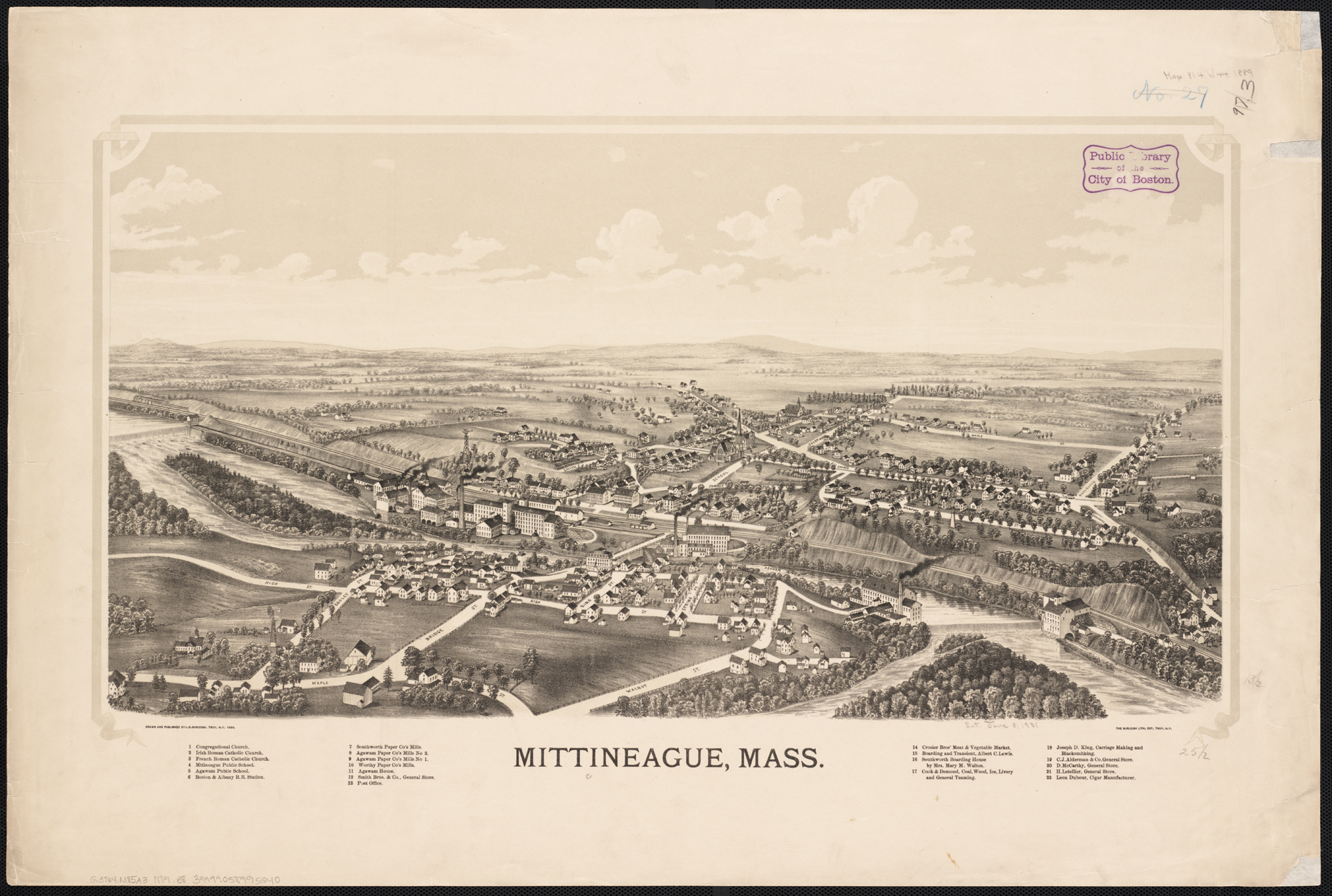
Mittineague, Massachusetts

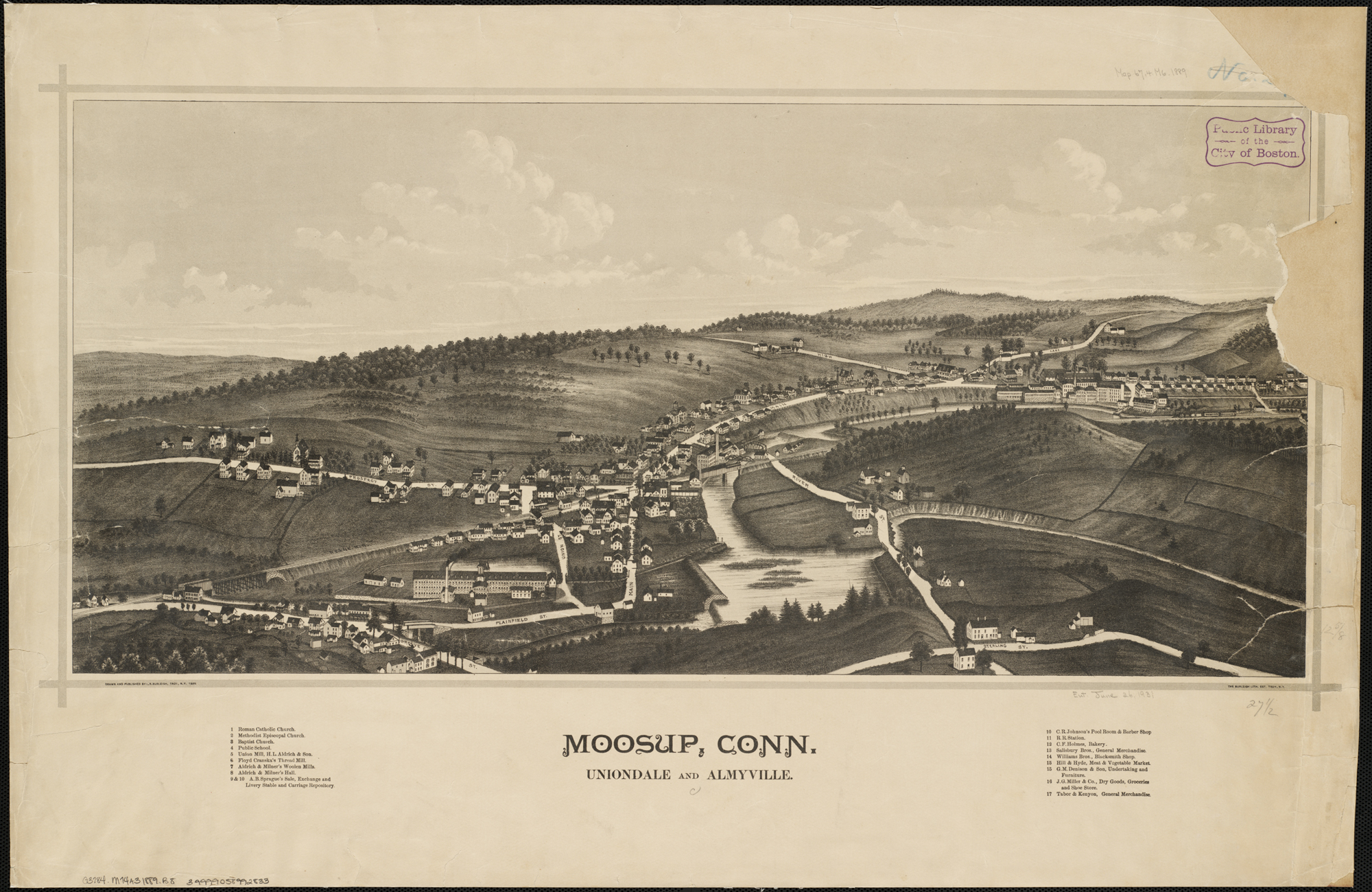
Moosup, Connecticut

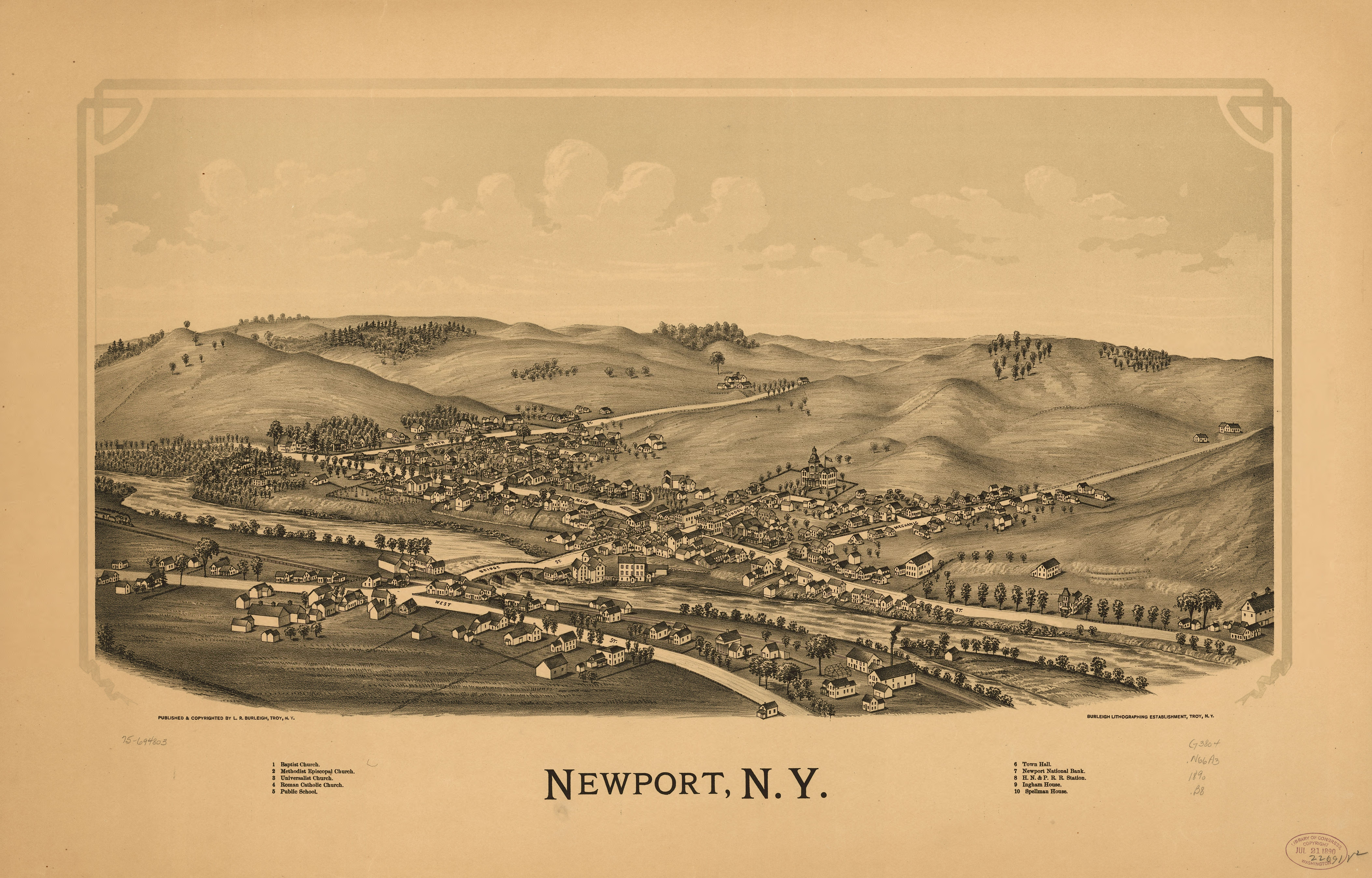
Newport, New York

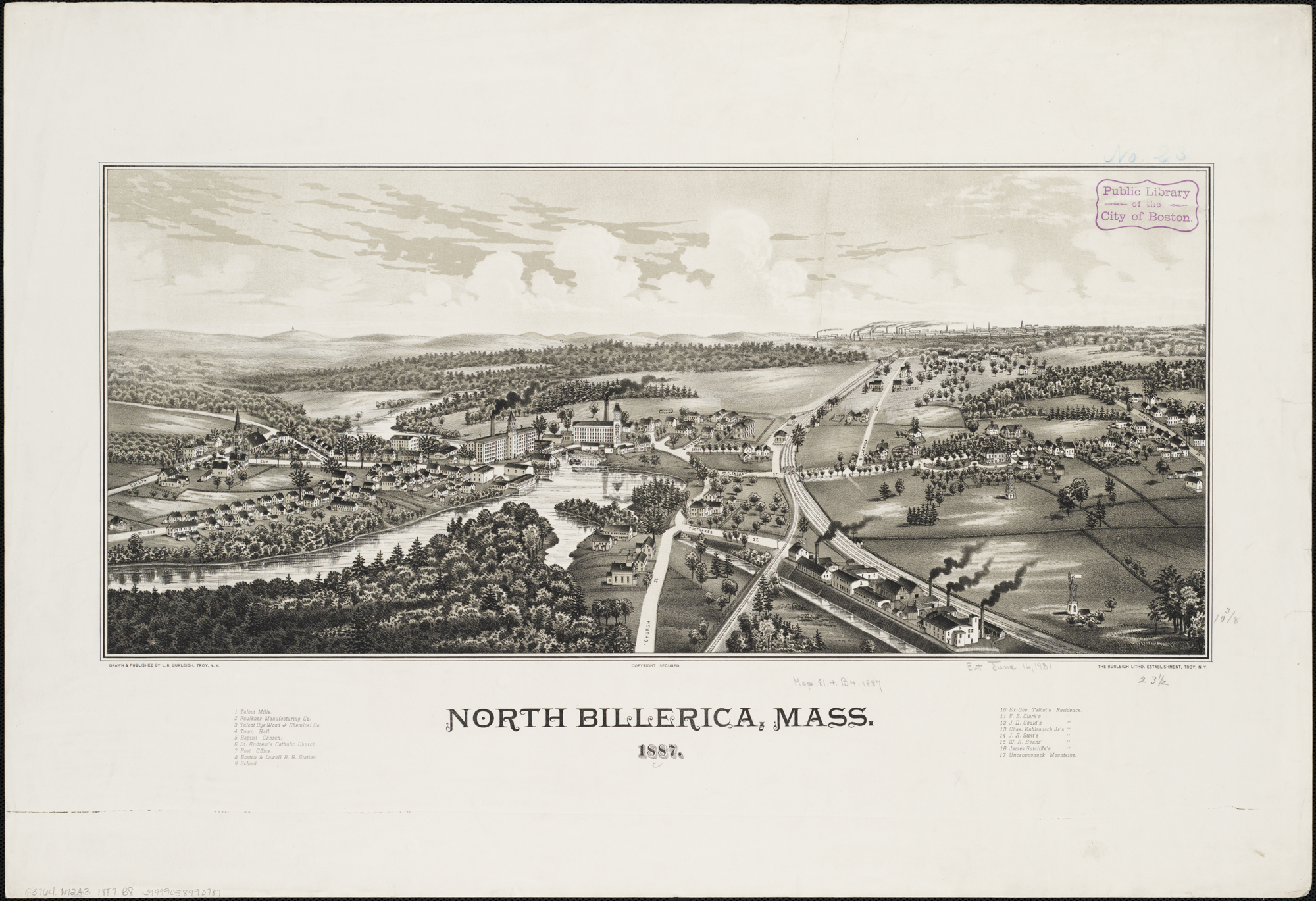
North Billerica, Massachusetts

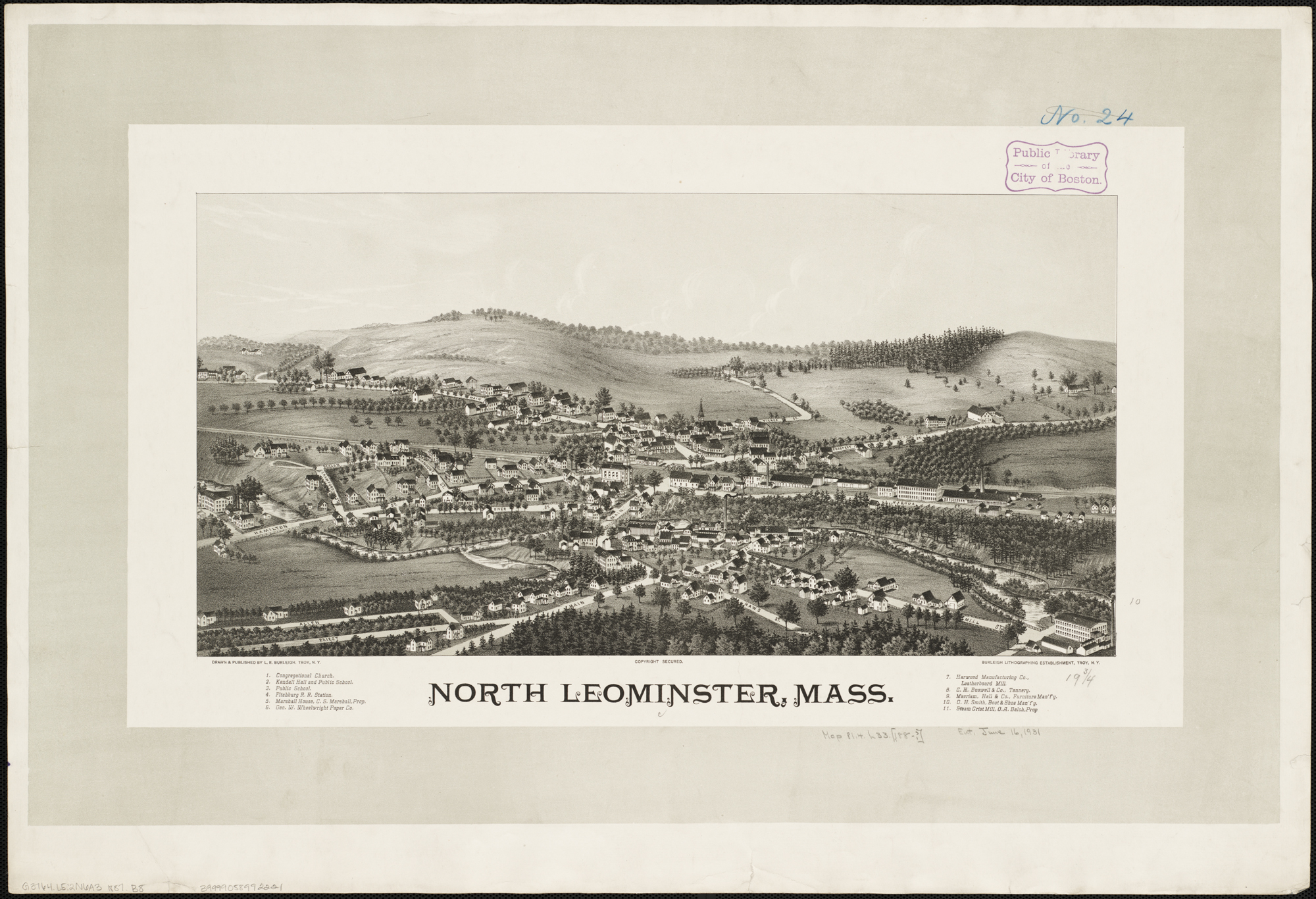
North Leominster

Oneonta, New York

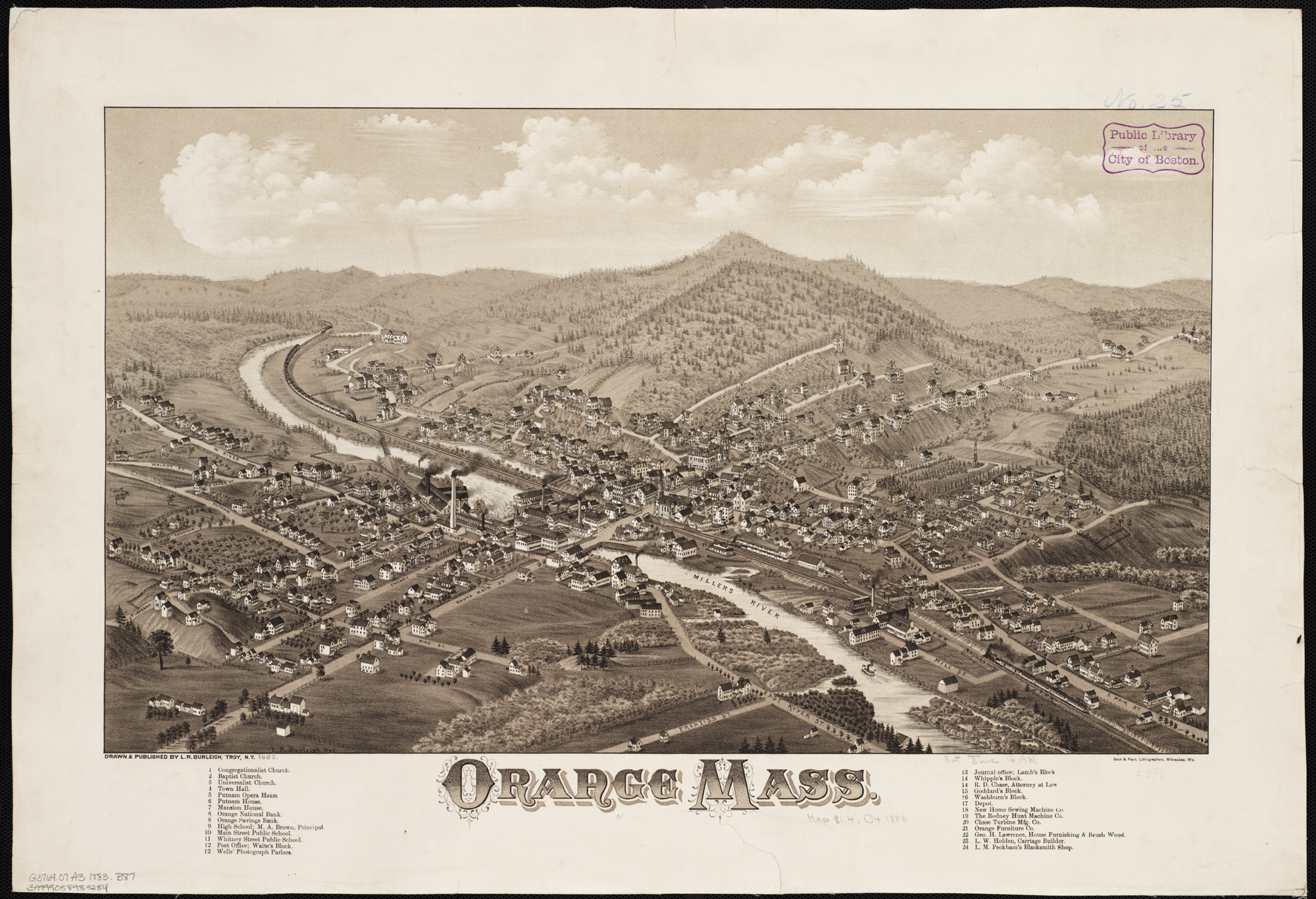
Orange, Massachusetts

Oriskany Falls, New York

Oxford, New York

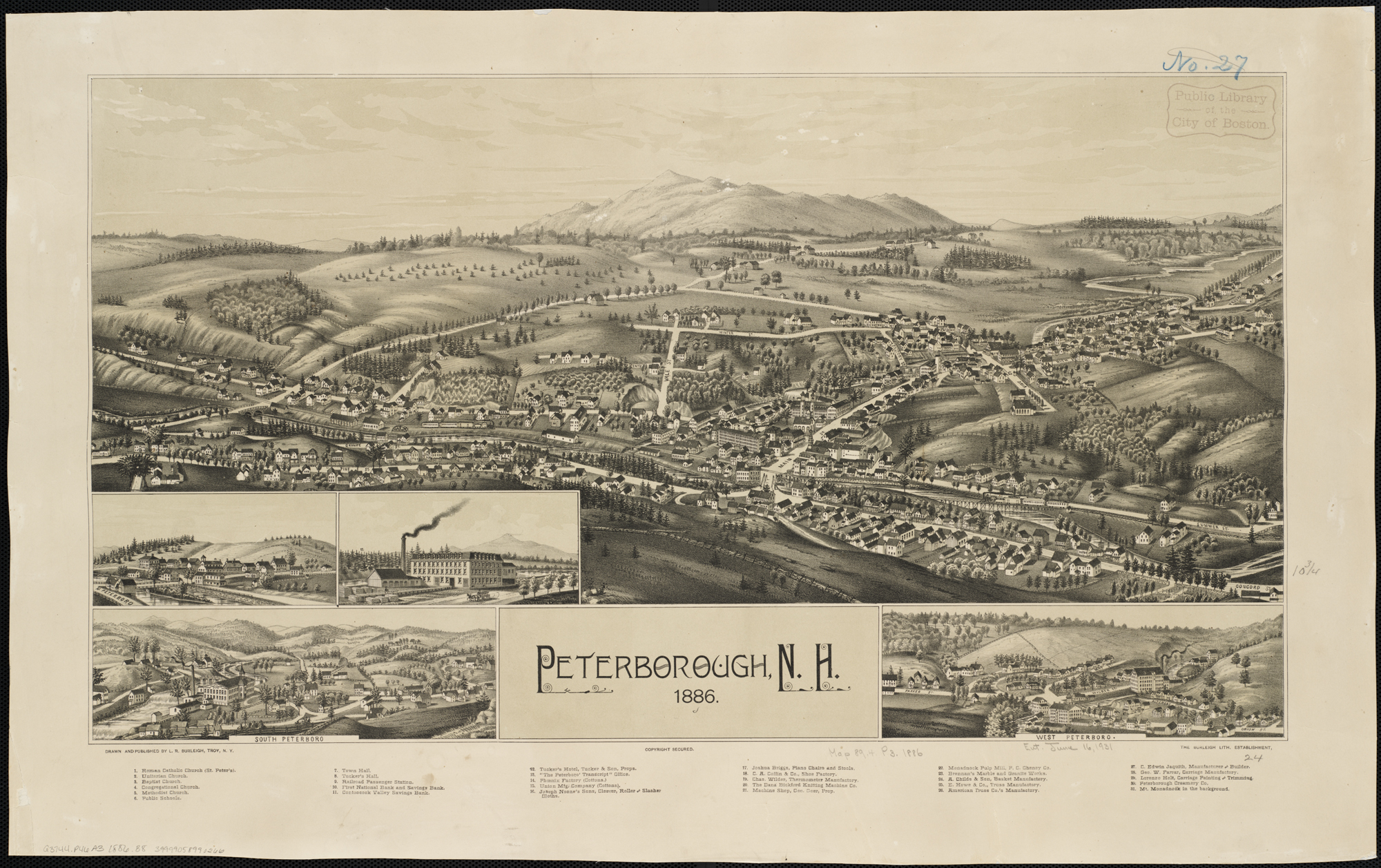
Peterborough, New Hampshire

Plattsburgh, New York by C. Fausel published by L.R. Burleigh

Poland, Herkimer County, New York

Port Henry, New York

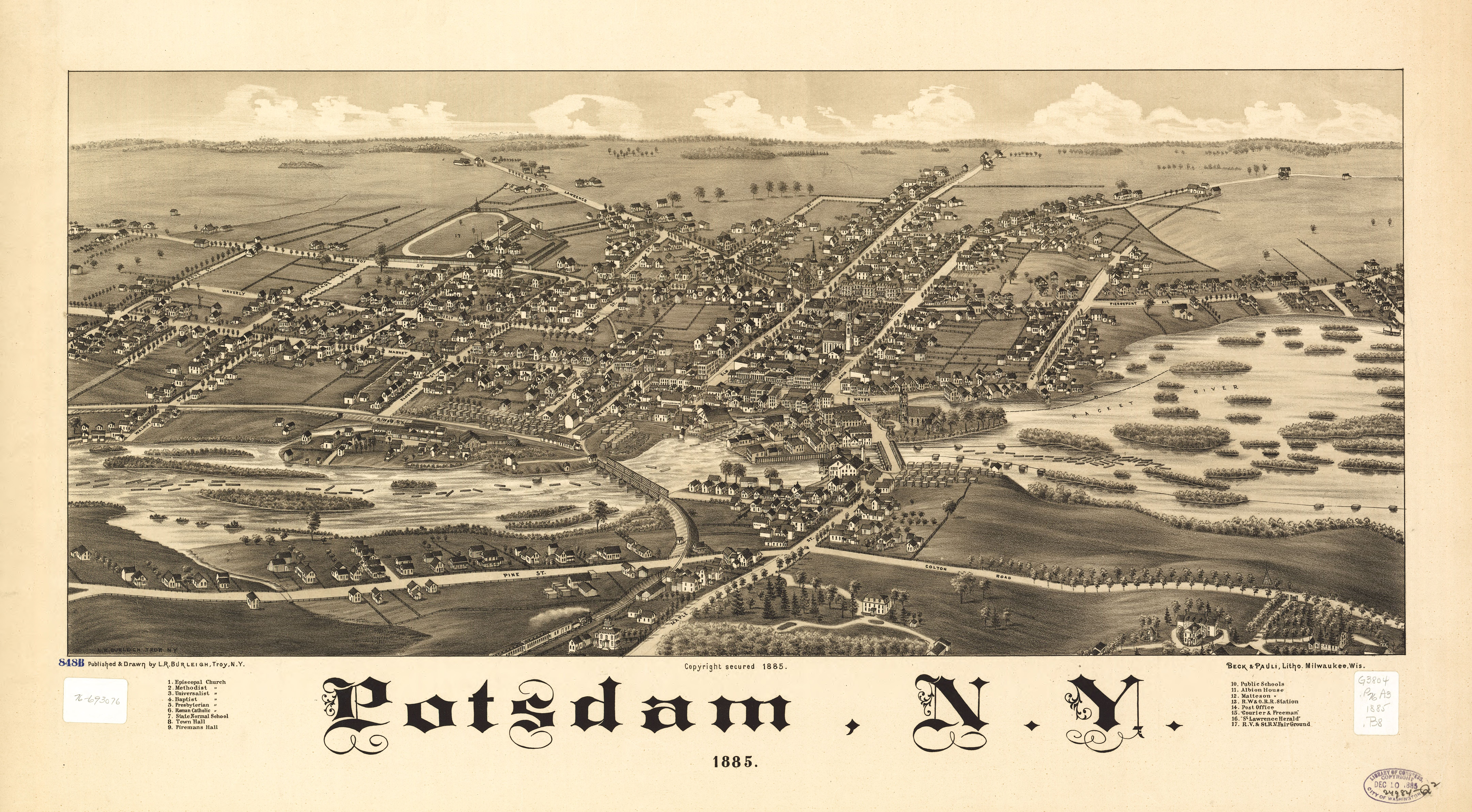
Potsdam, New York

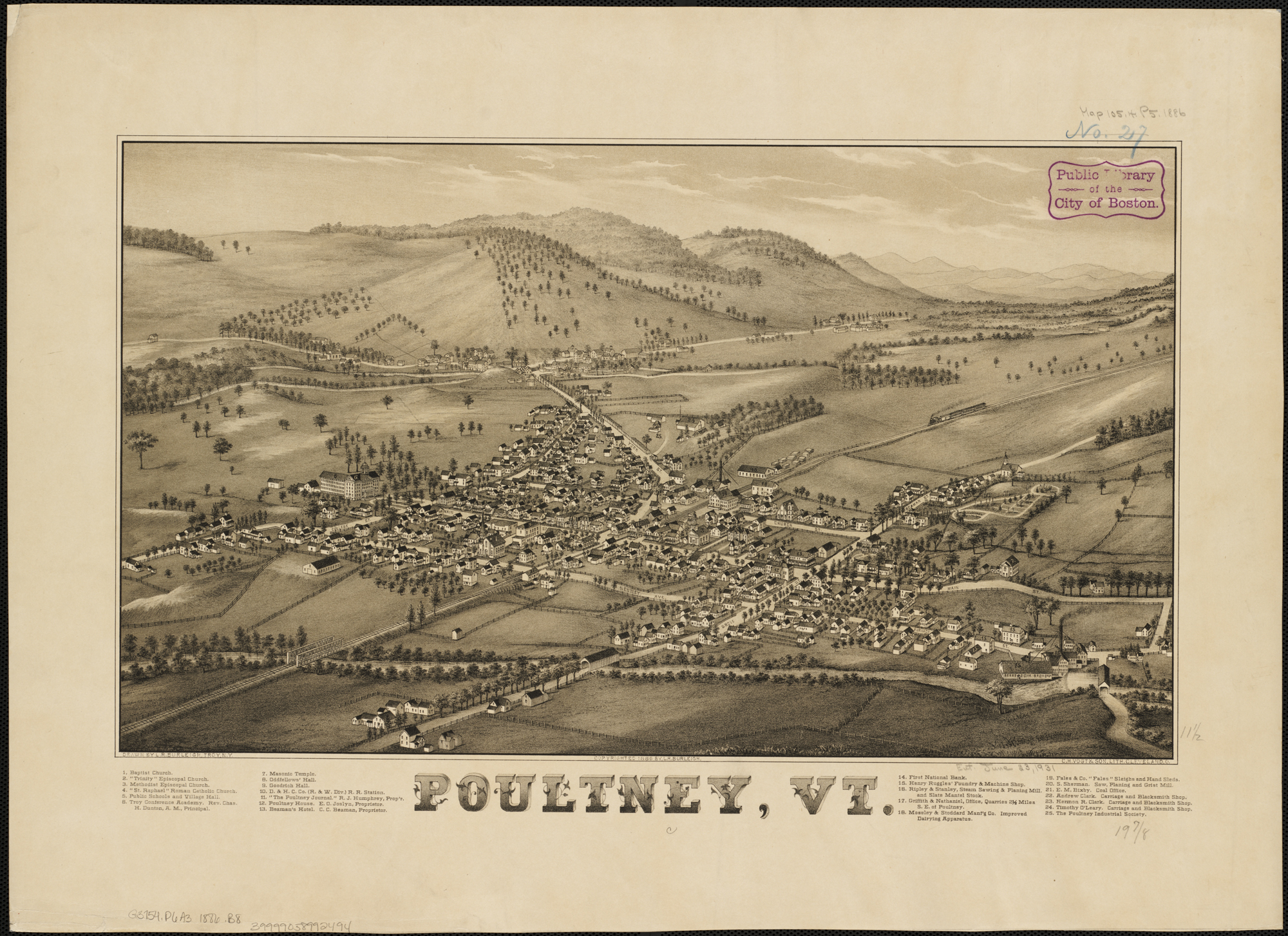
Poultney, Vermont

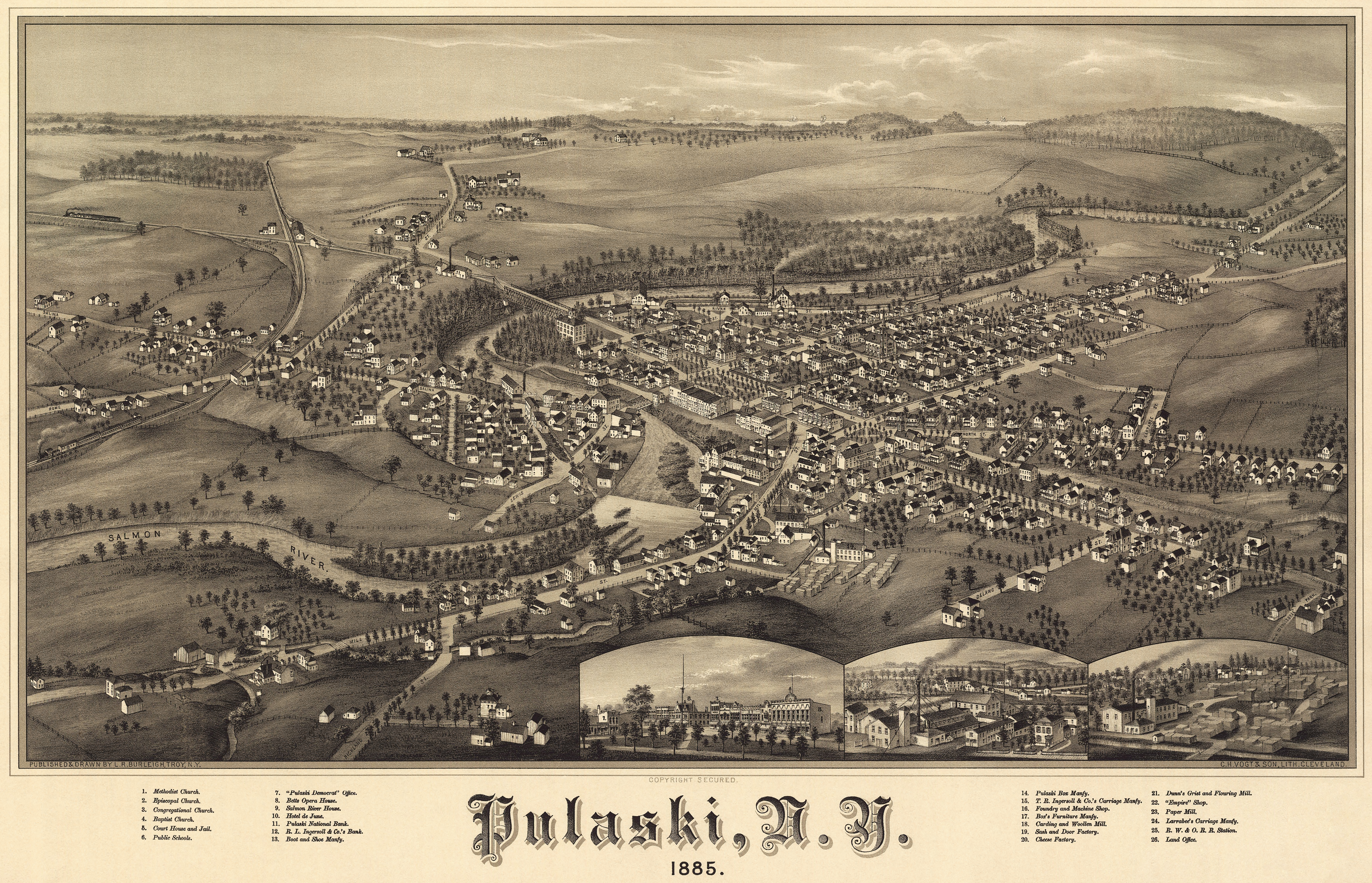
Pulaski, New York

Rhinebeck, New York

Richfield Springs, New York

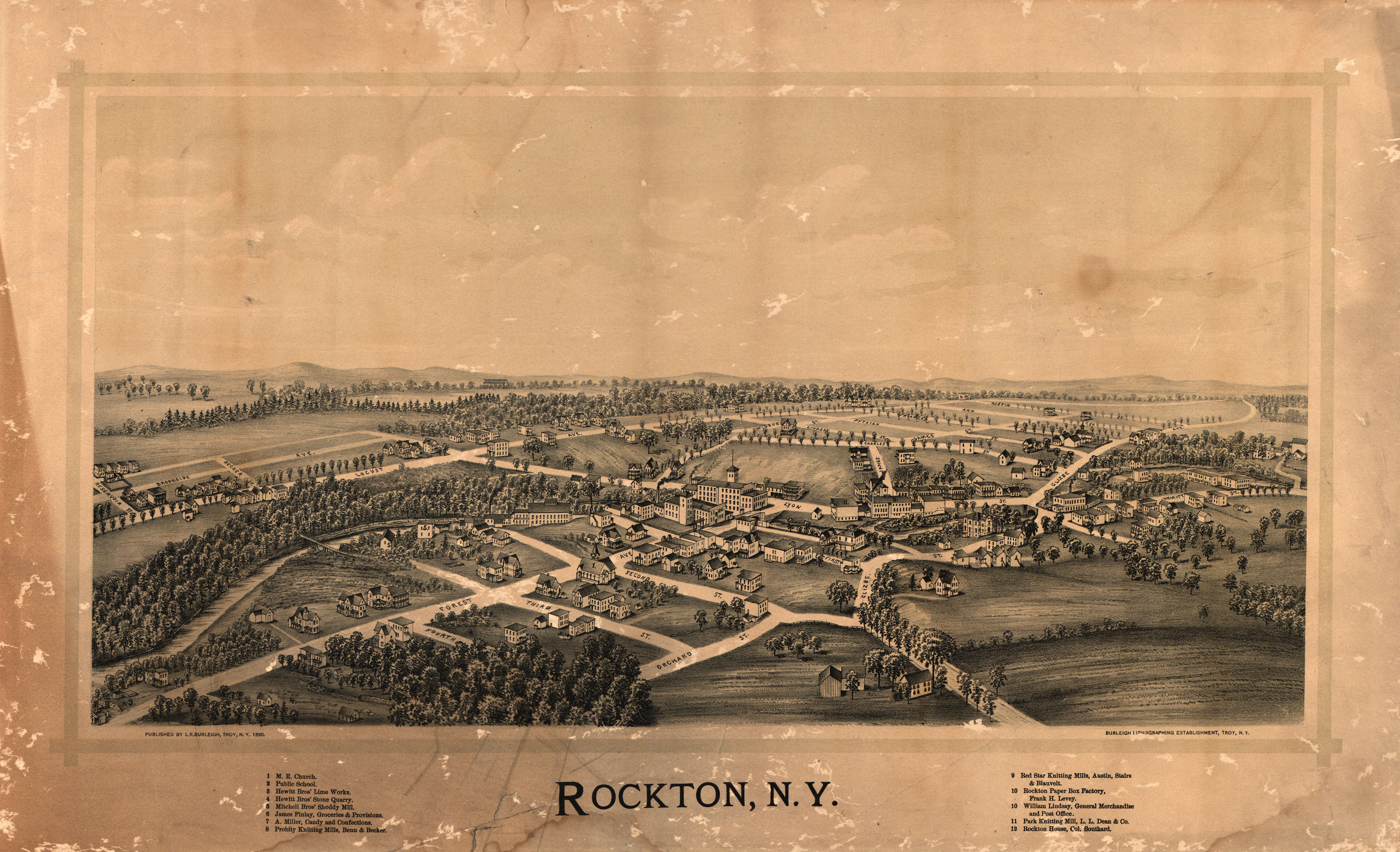
Rockton, New York

Rome, New York

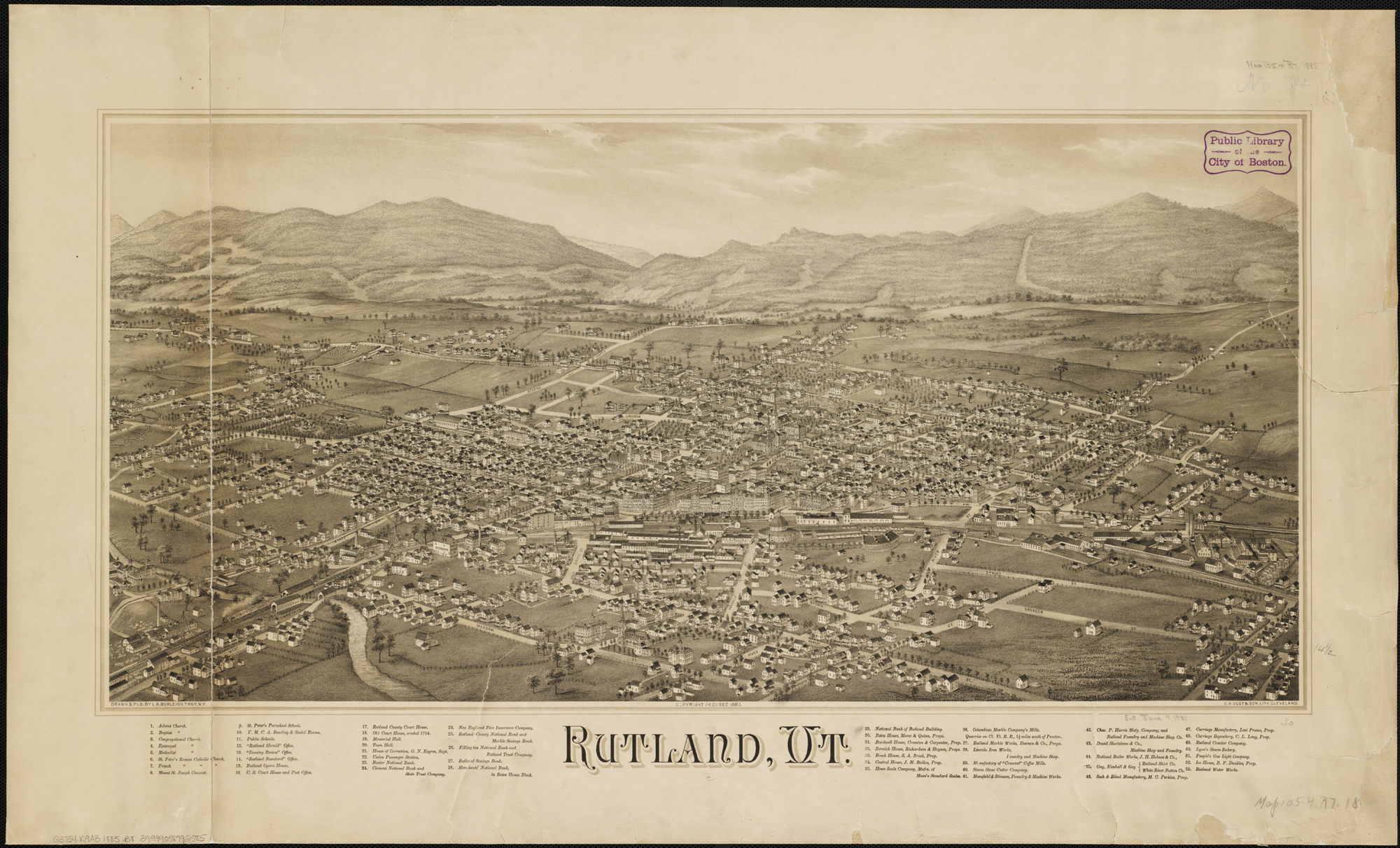
Rutland, Vermont

Salem, New York

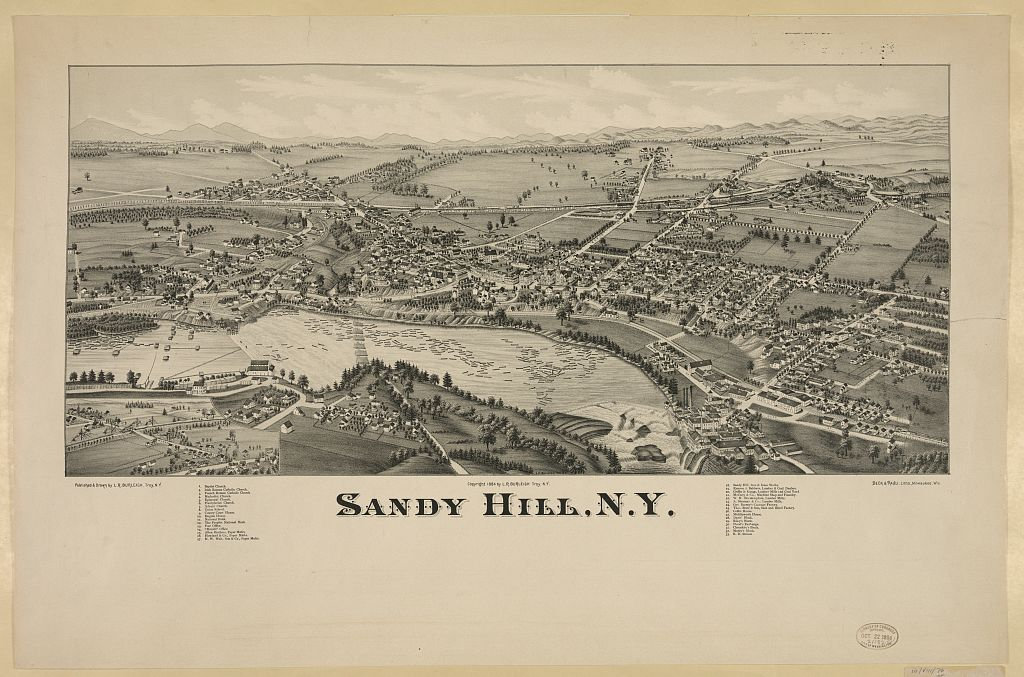
Sandy Hill, New York

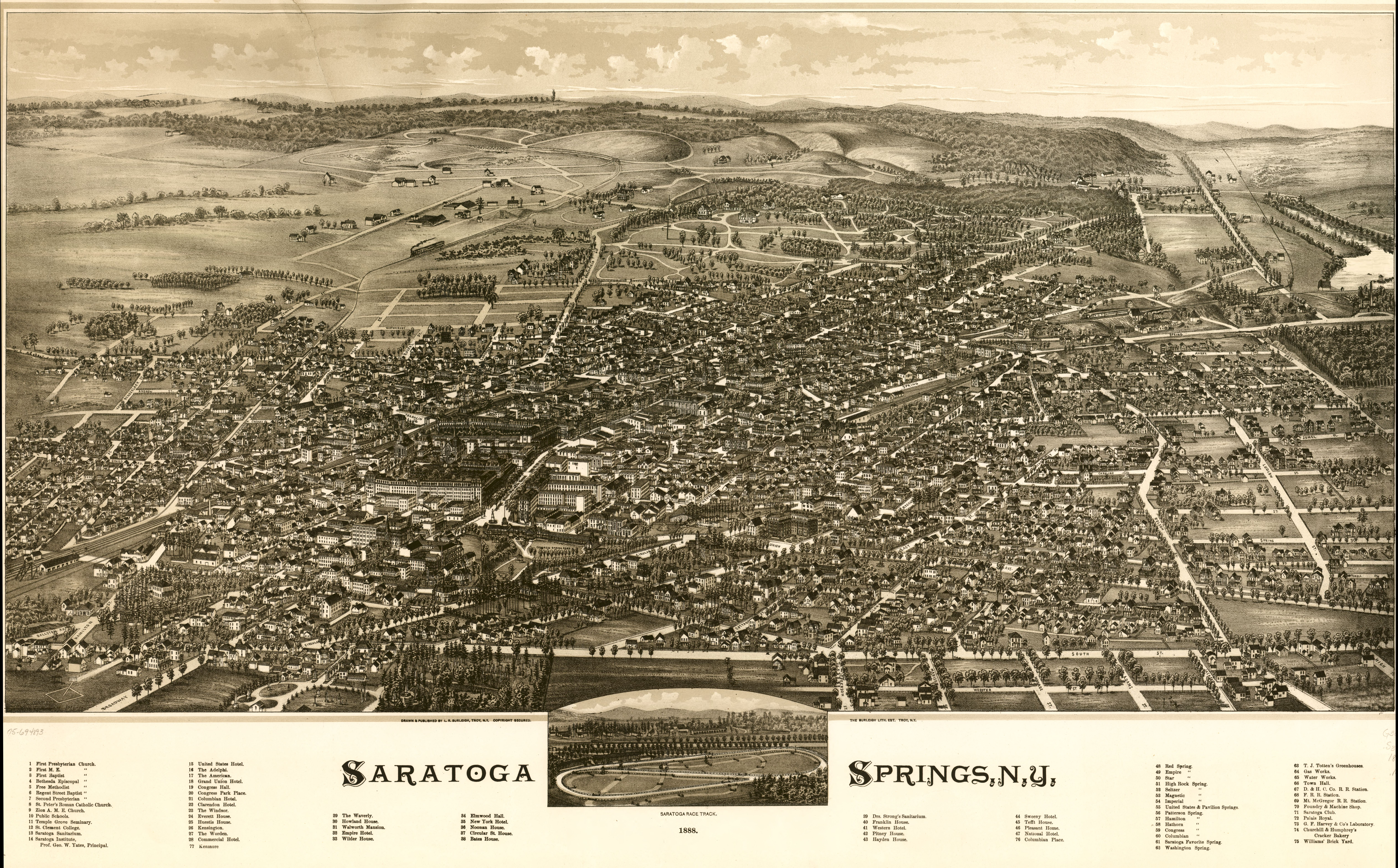
Saratoga Springs, New York

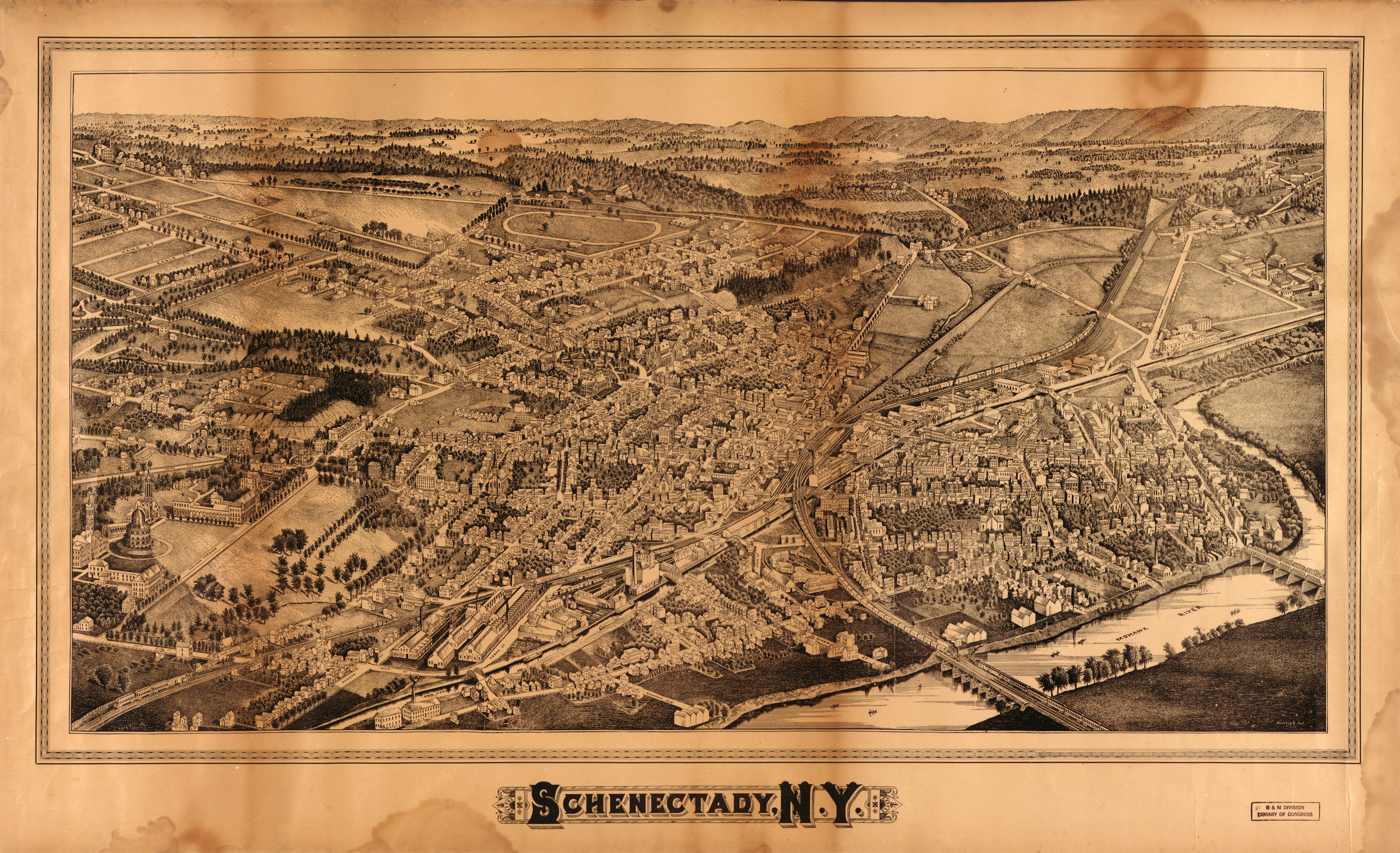
Schenectady, New York - J. Lyth 1882

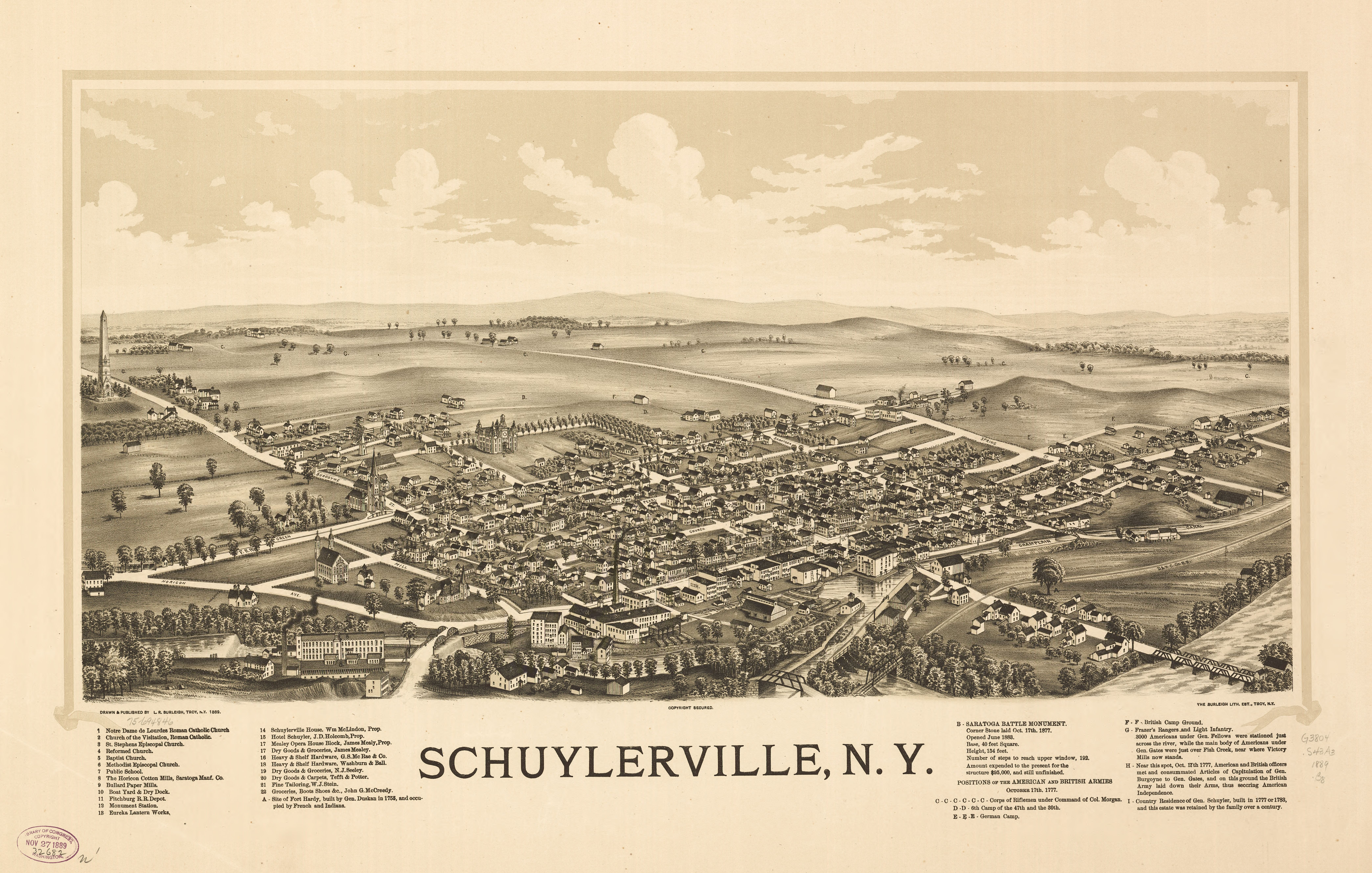
Schuylerville, New York

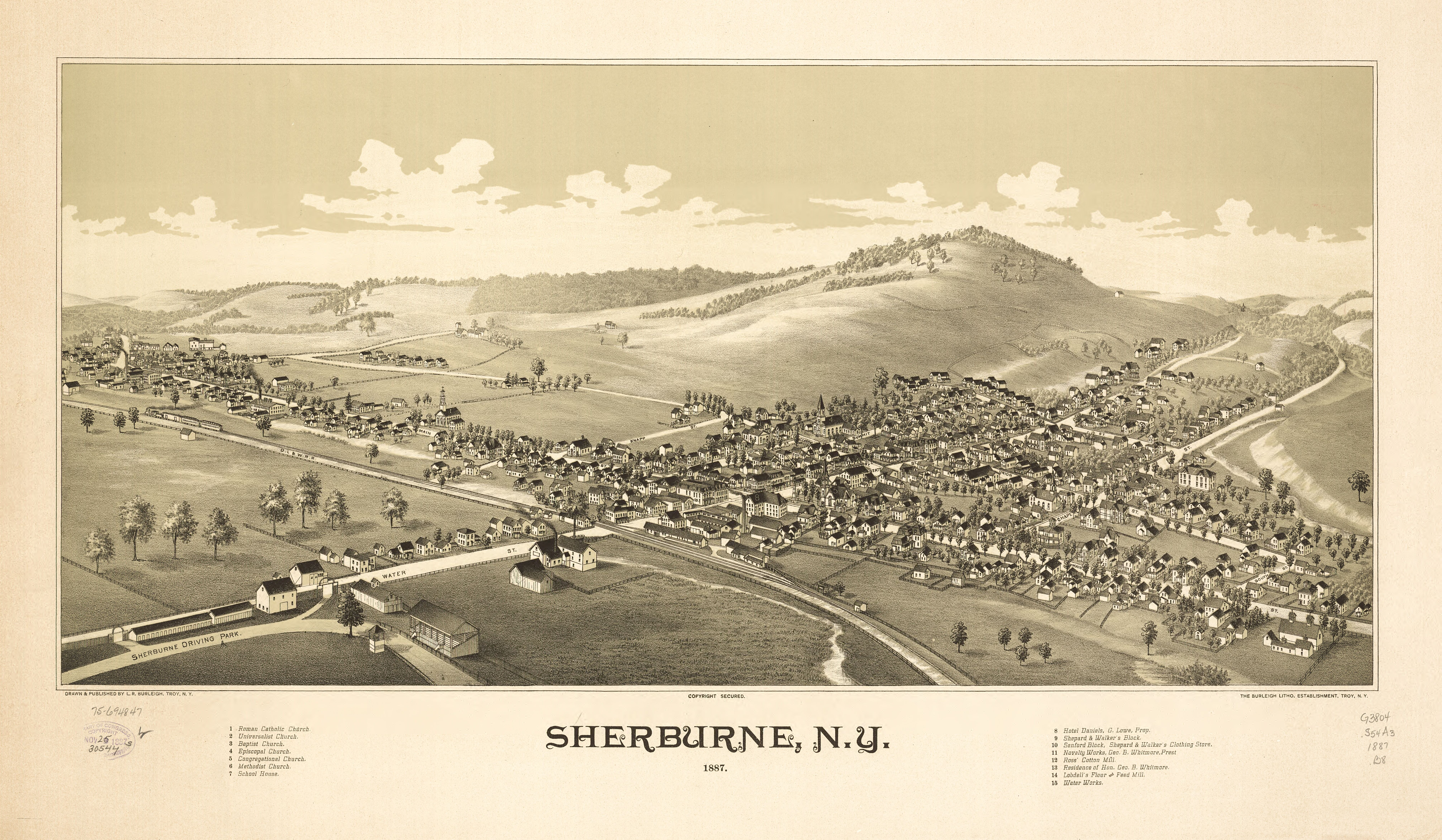
Sherburne, New York

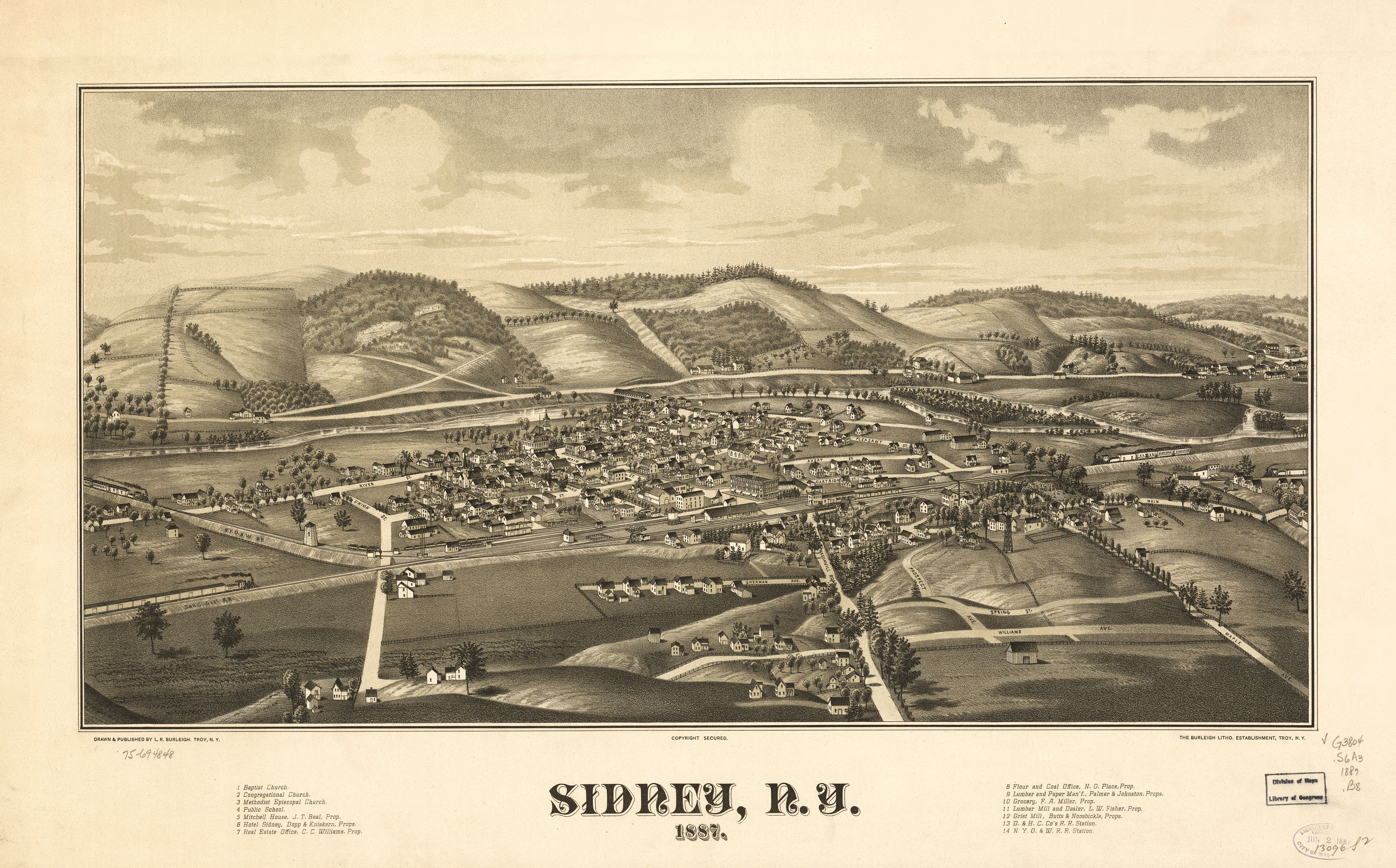
Sidney, New York

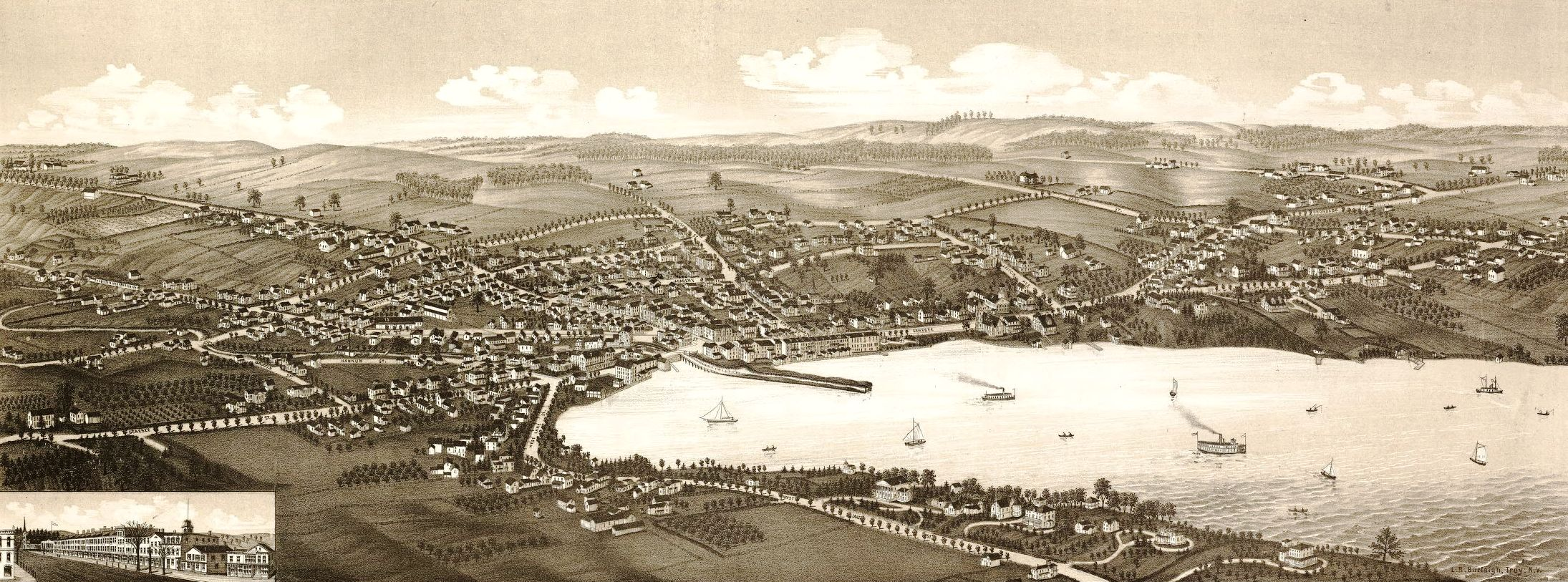
Skaneateles, New York

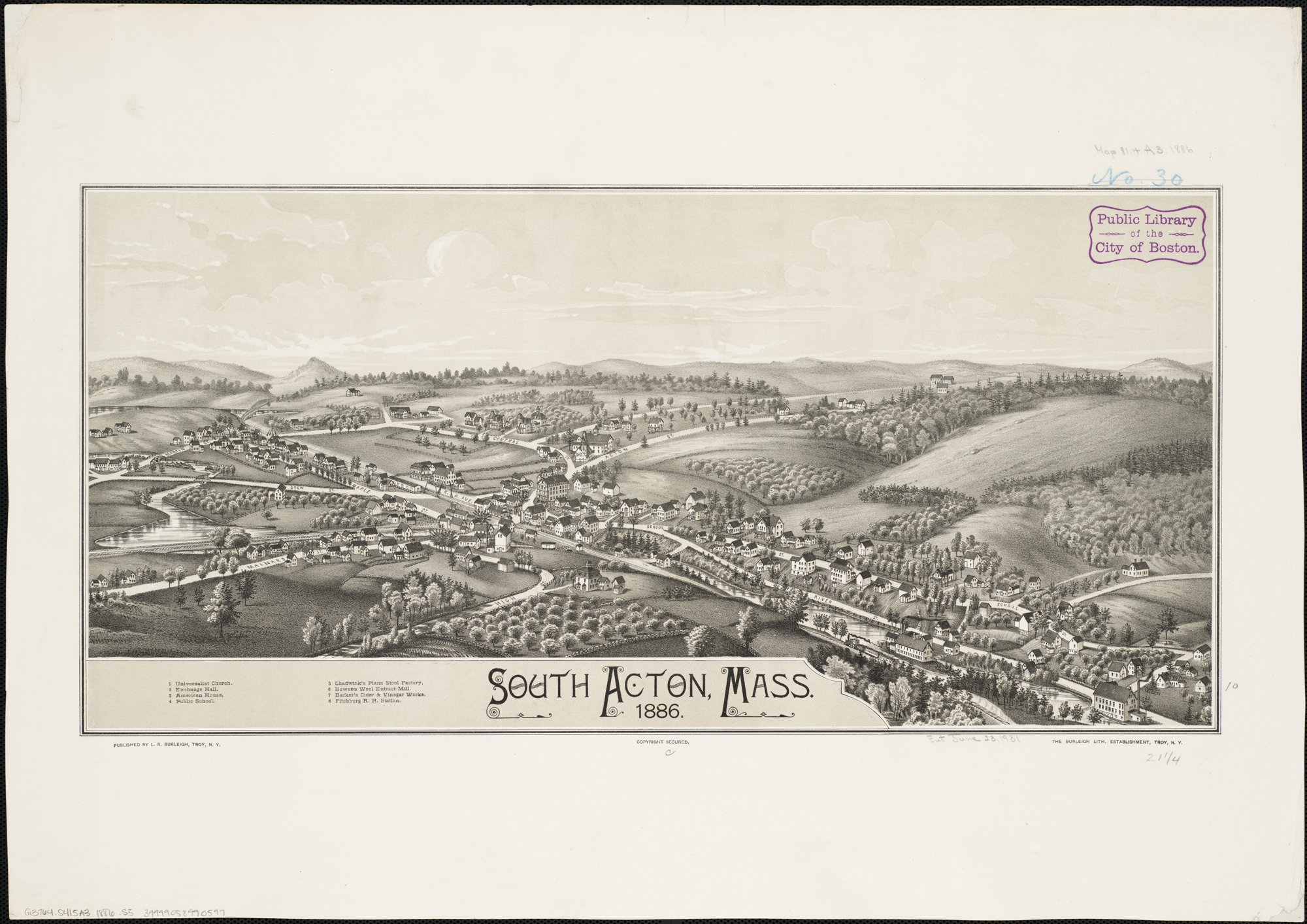
South Acton, Massachusetts

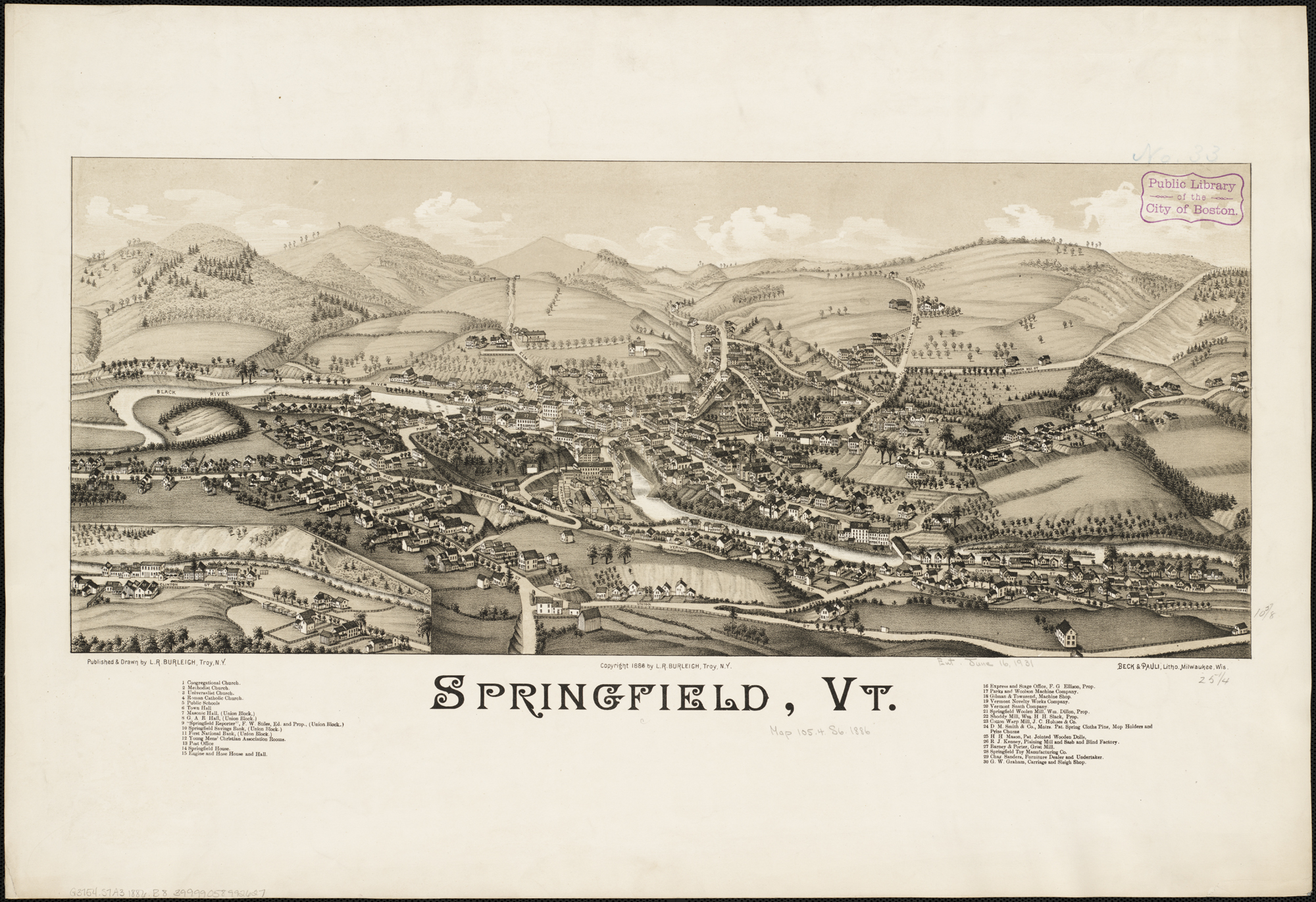
Springfield, Vermont

St. Johnsville, New York

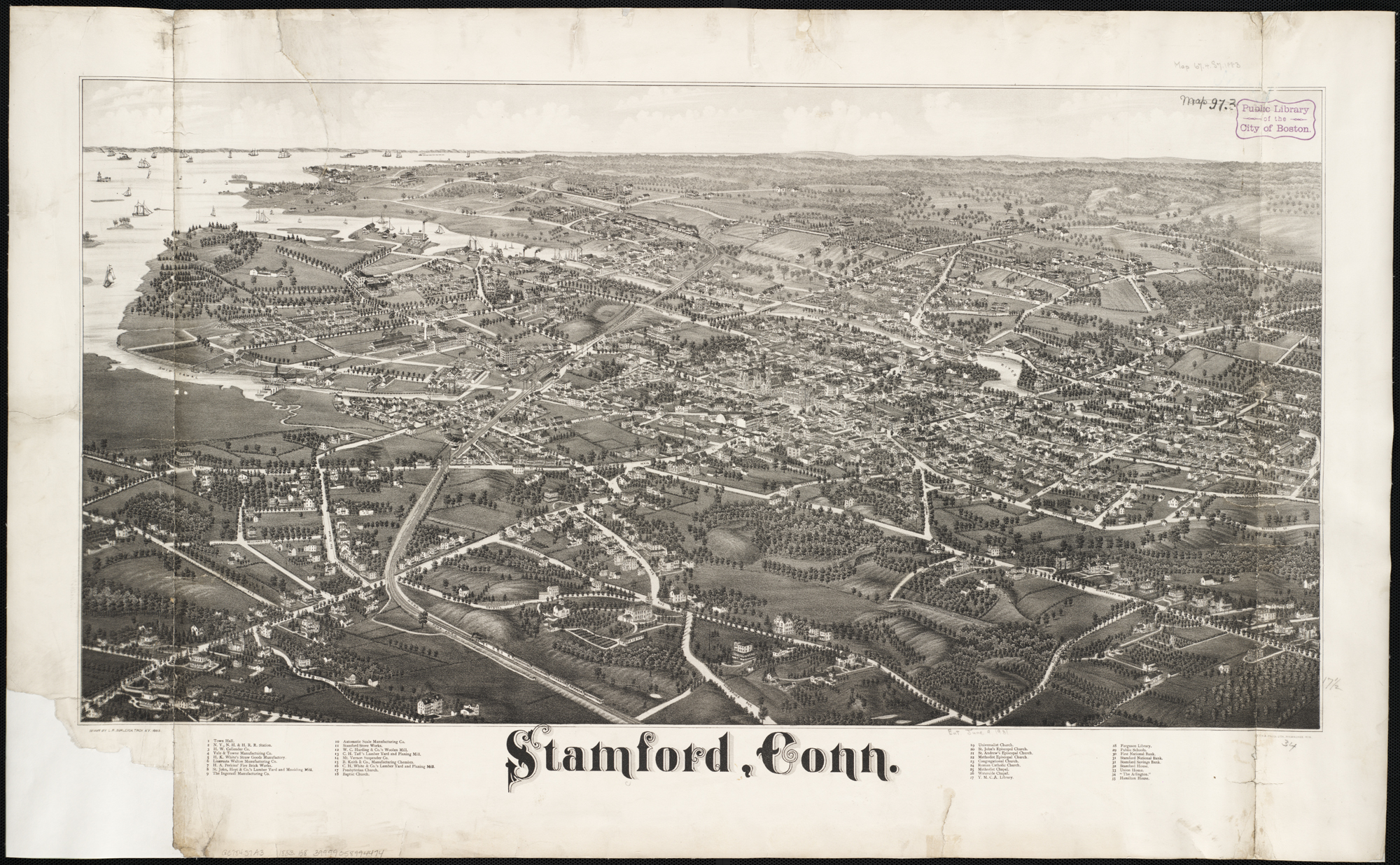
Stamford, Connecticut

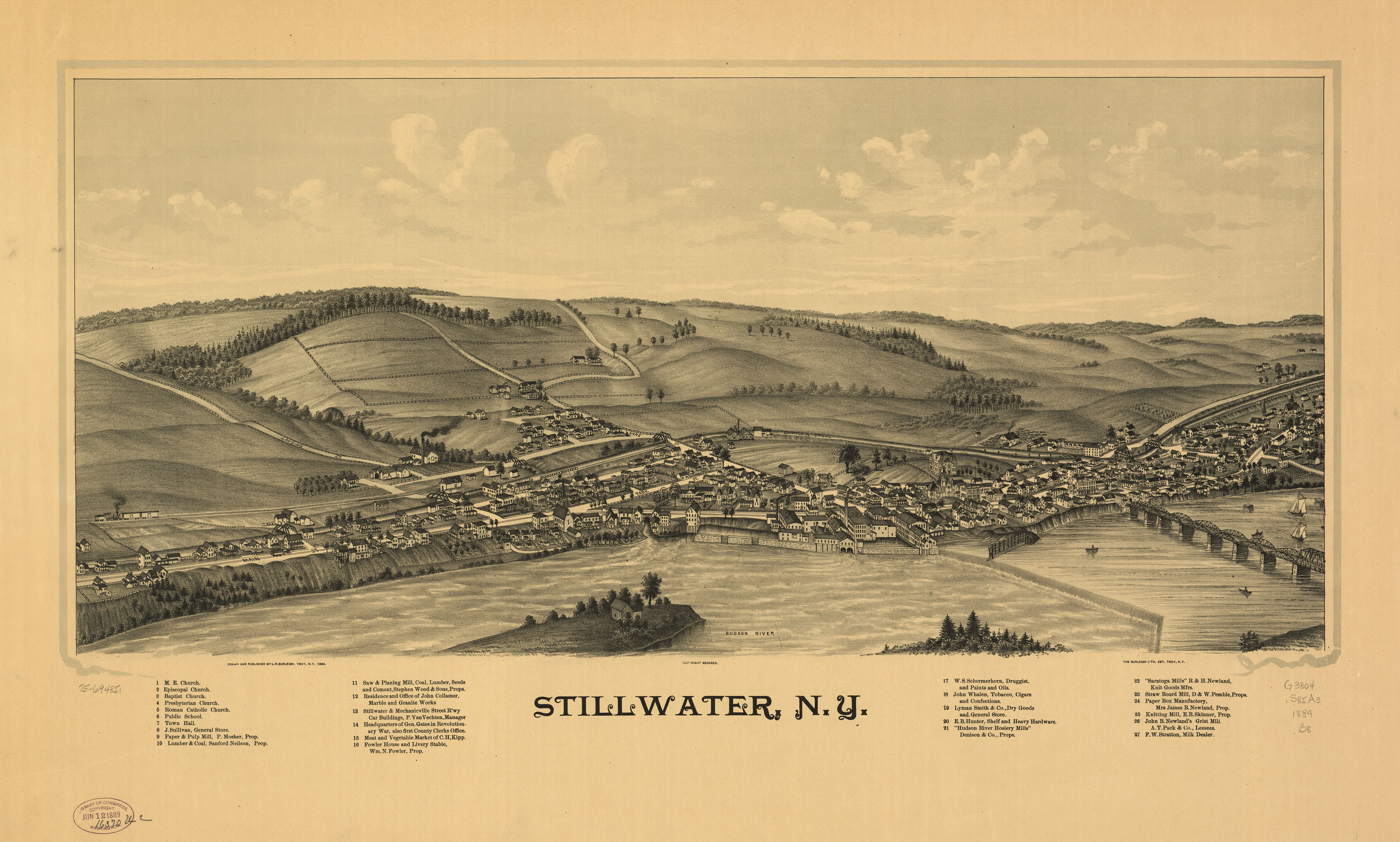
Stillwater, New York

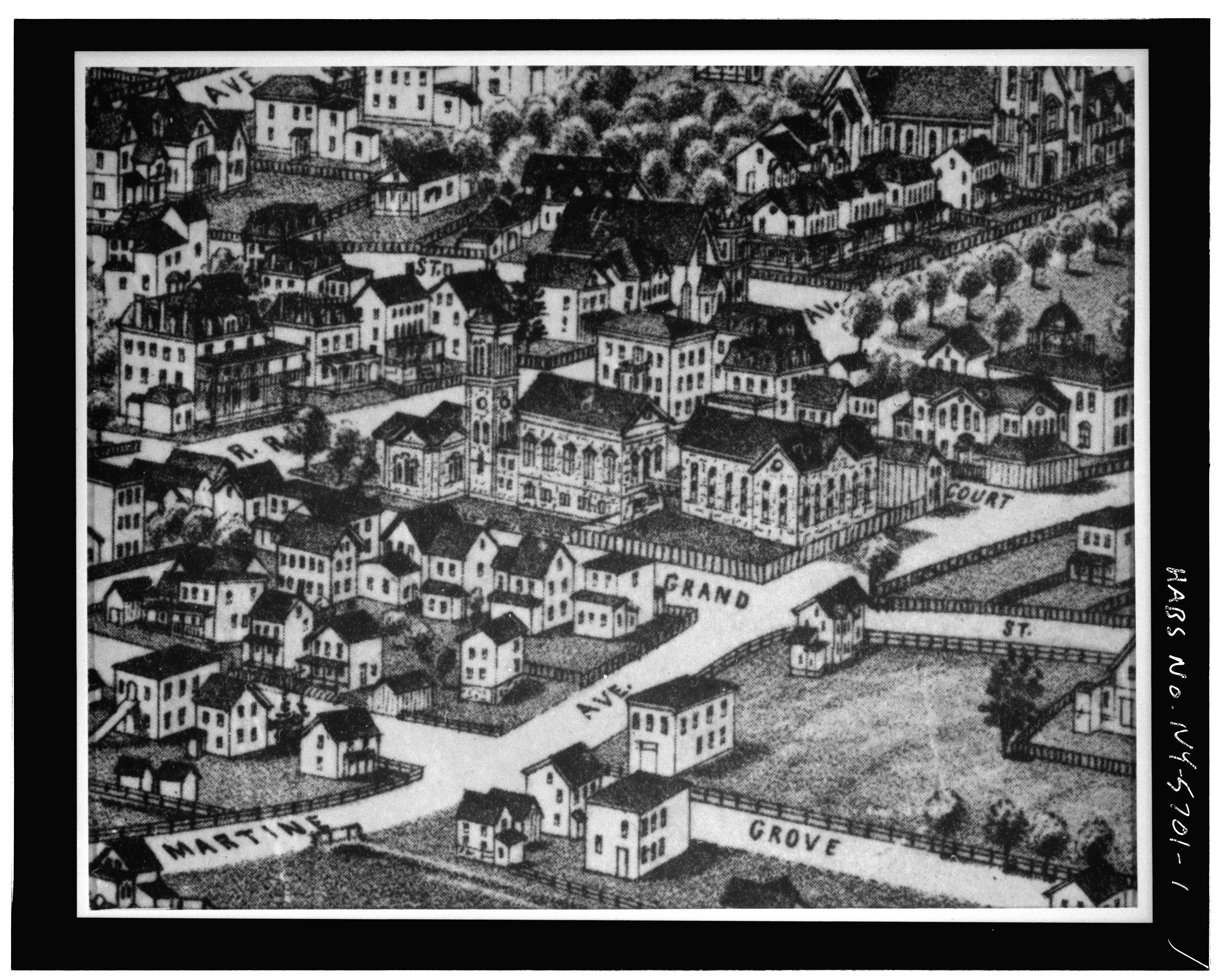
Troy, New York

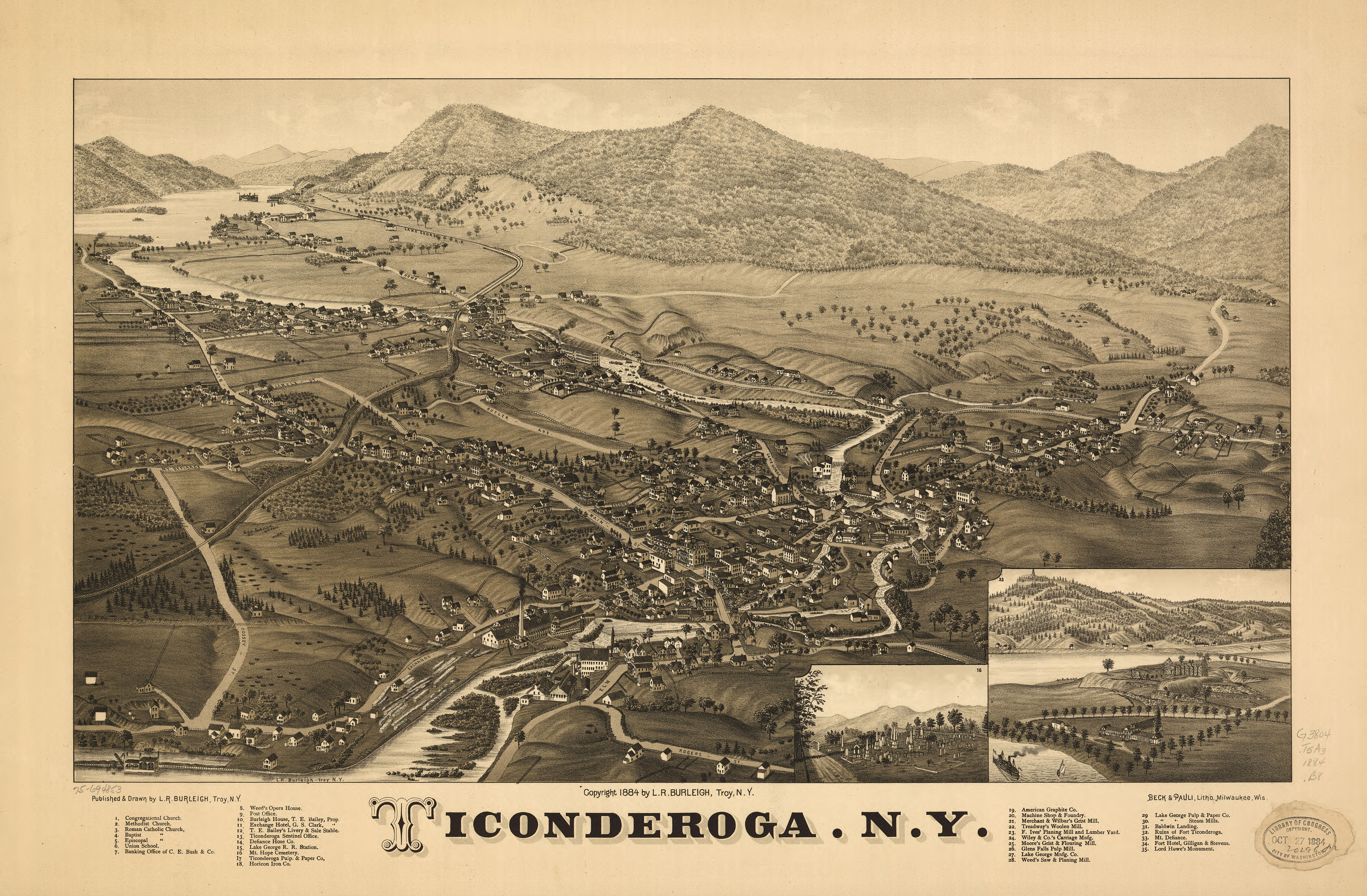
Ticonderoga, New York

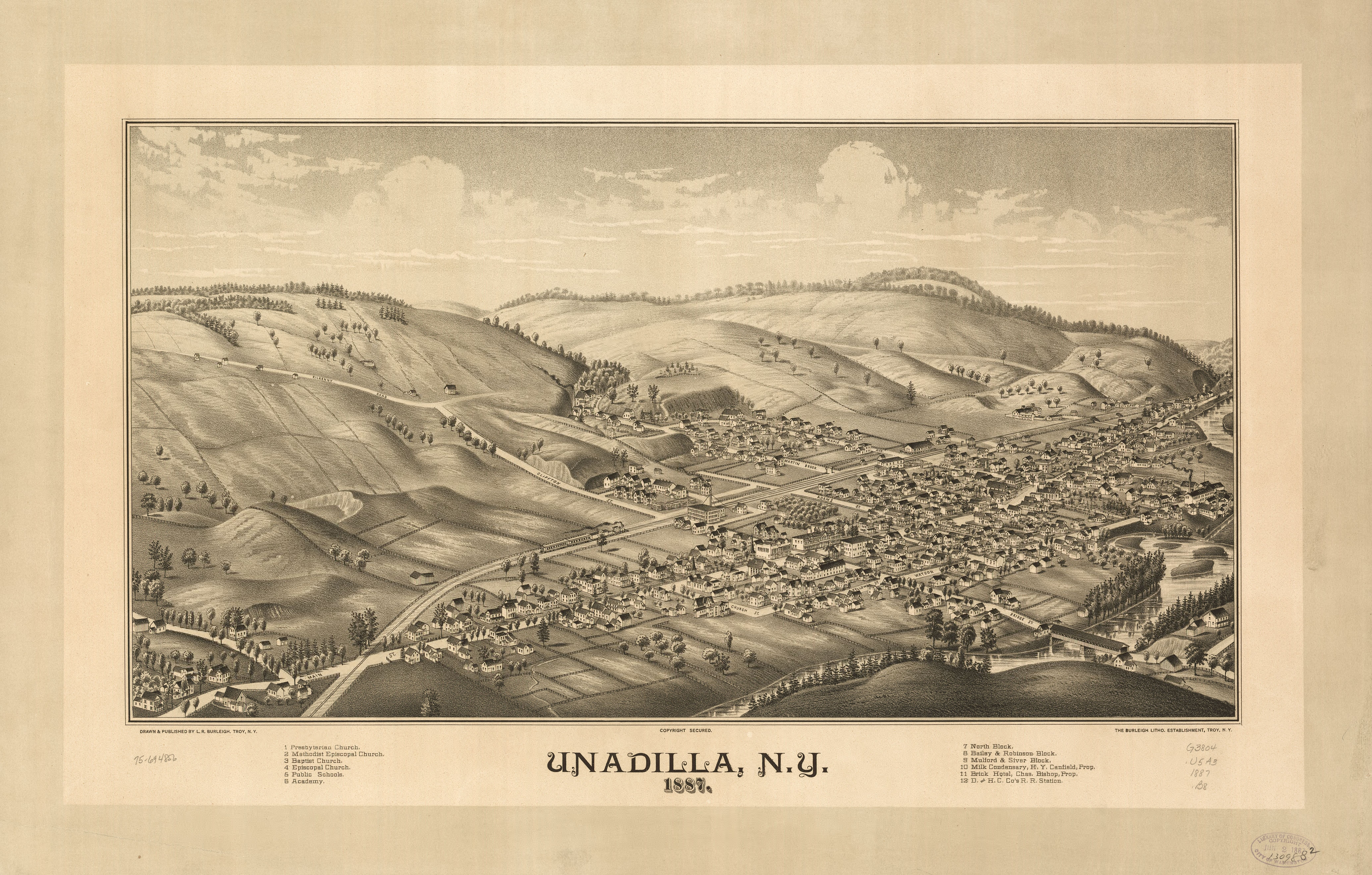
Unadilla, New York

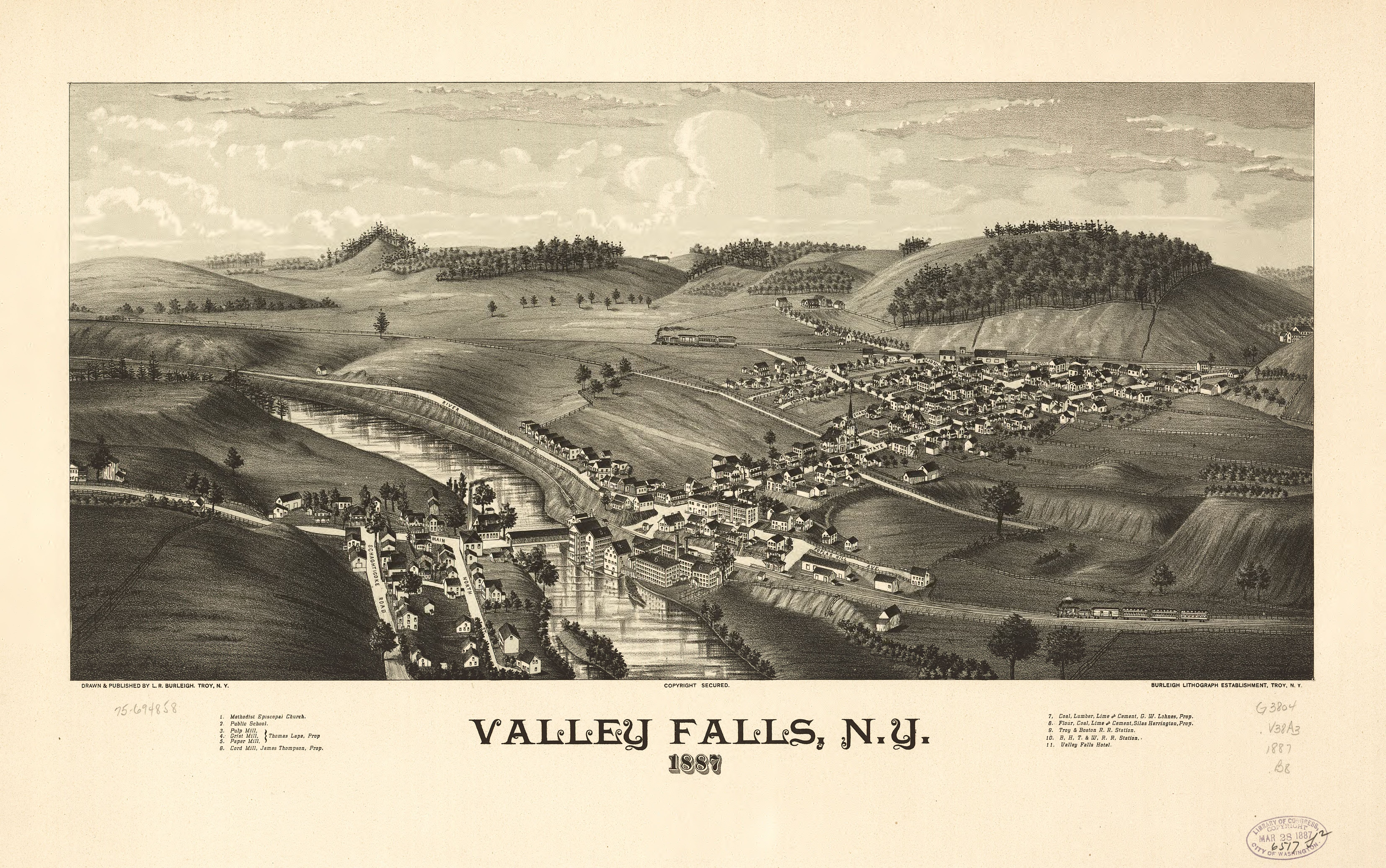
Valley Falls, New York

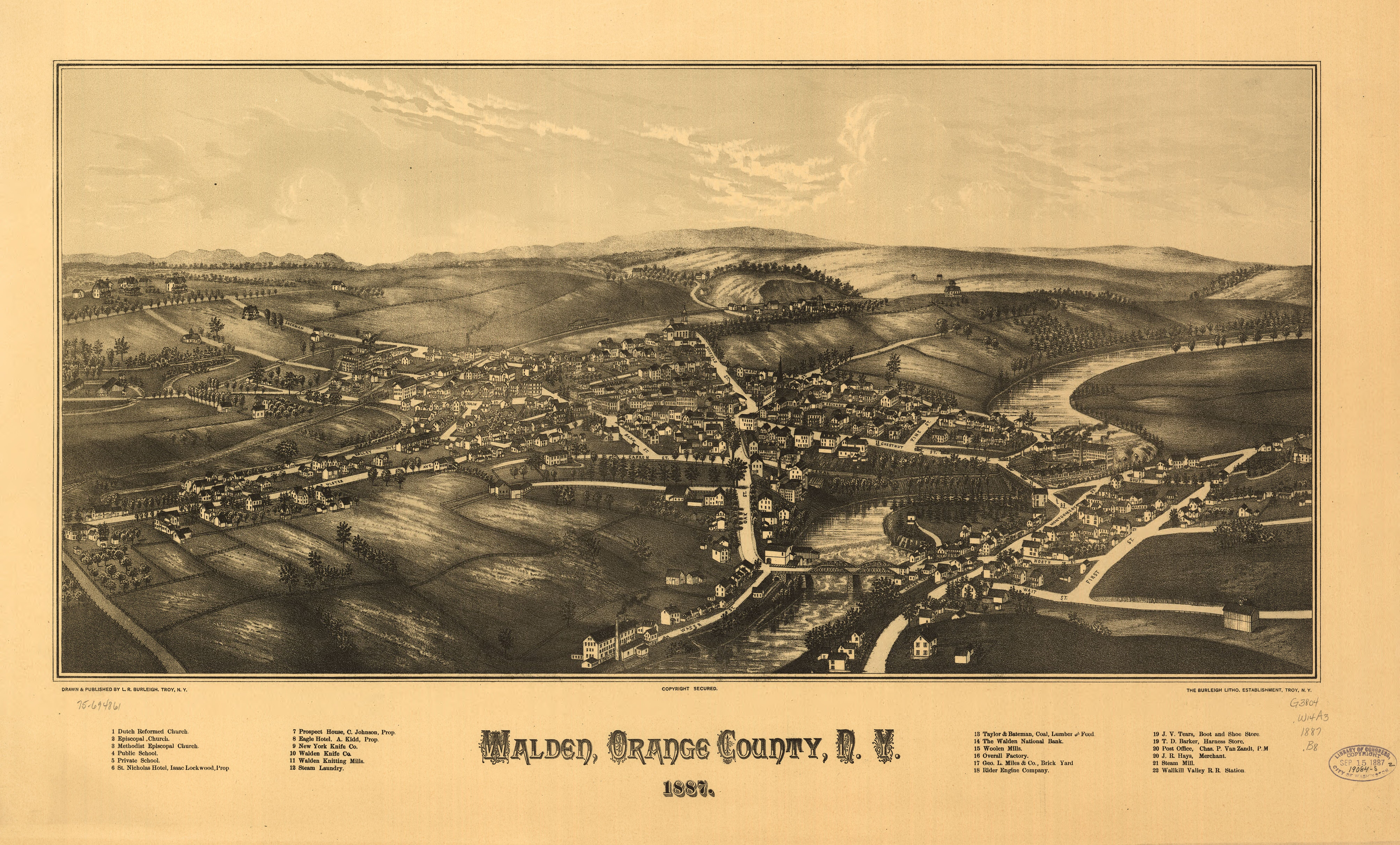
Walden, New York

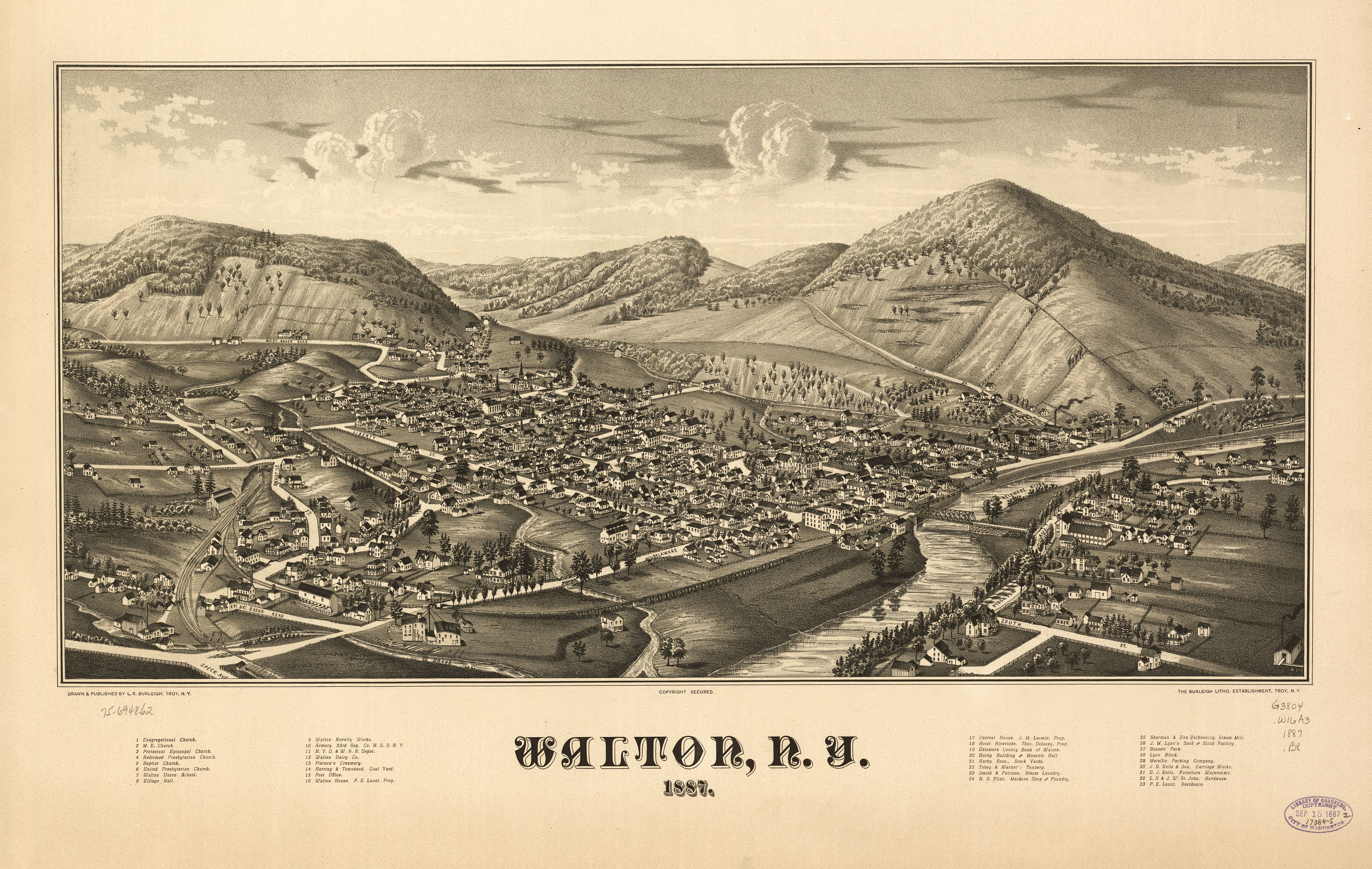
Walton, New York

Wappingers Falls, New York

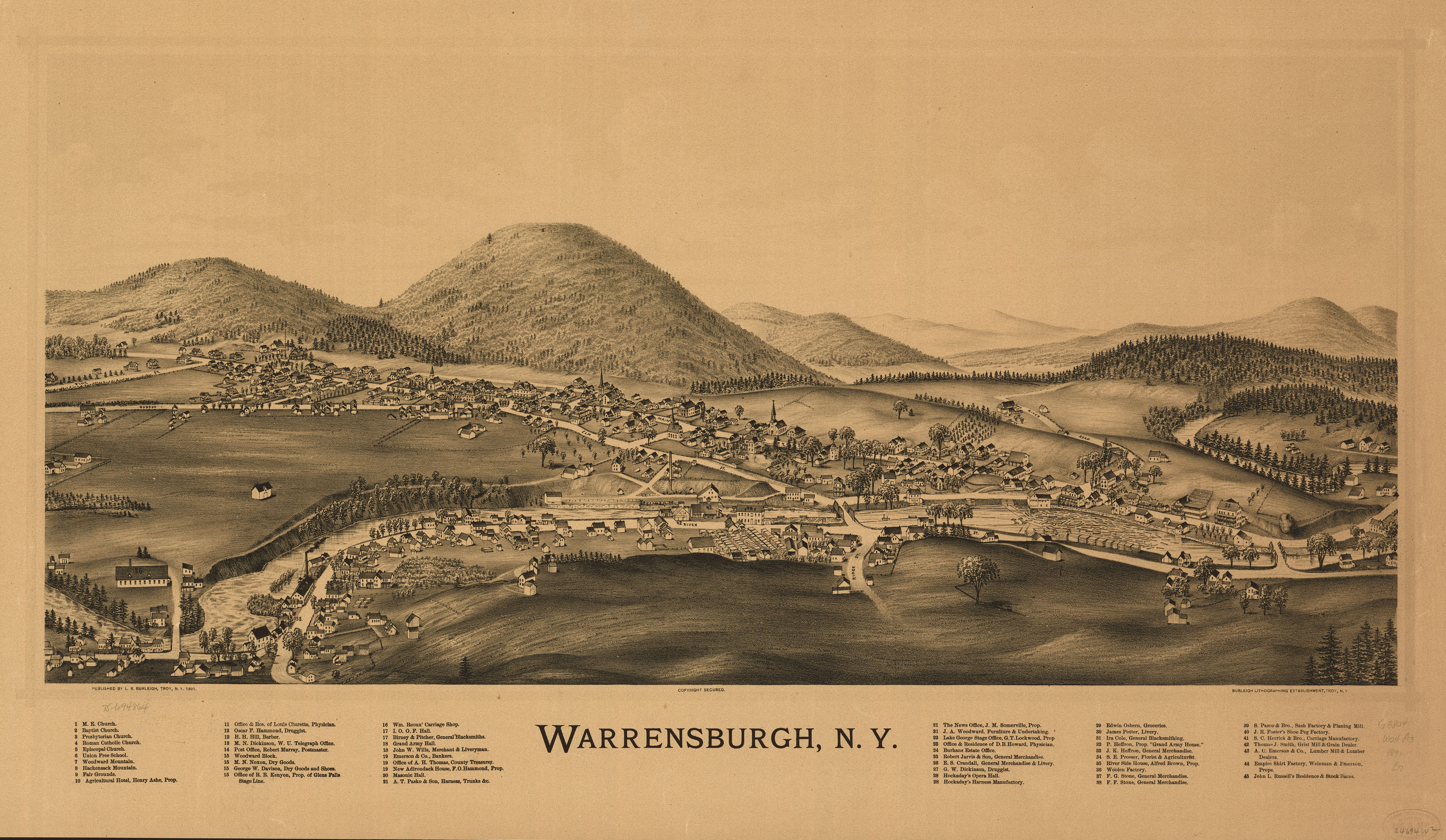
Warrensburgh, New York published by L.R. Burleigh 1891

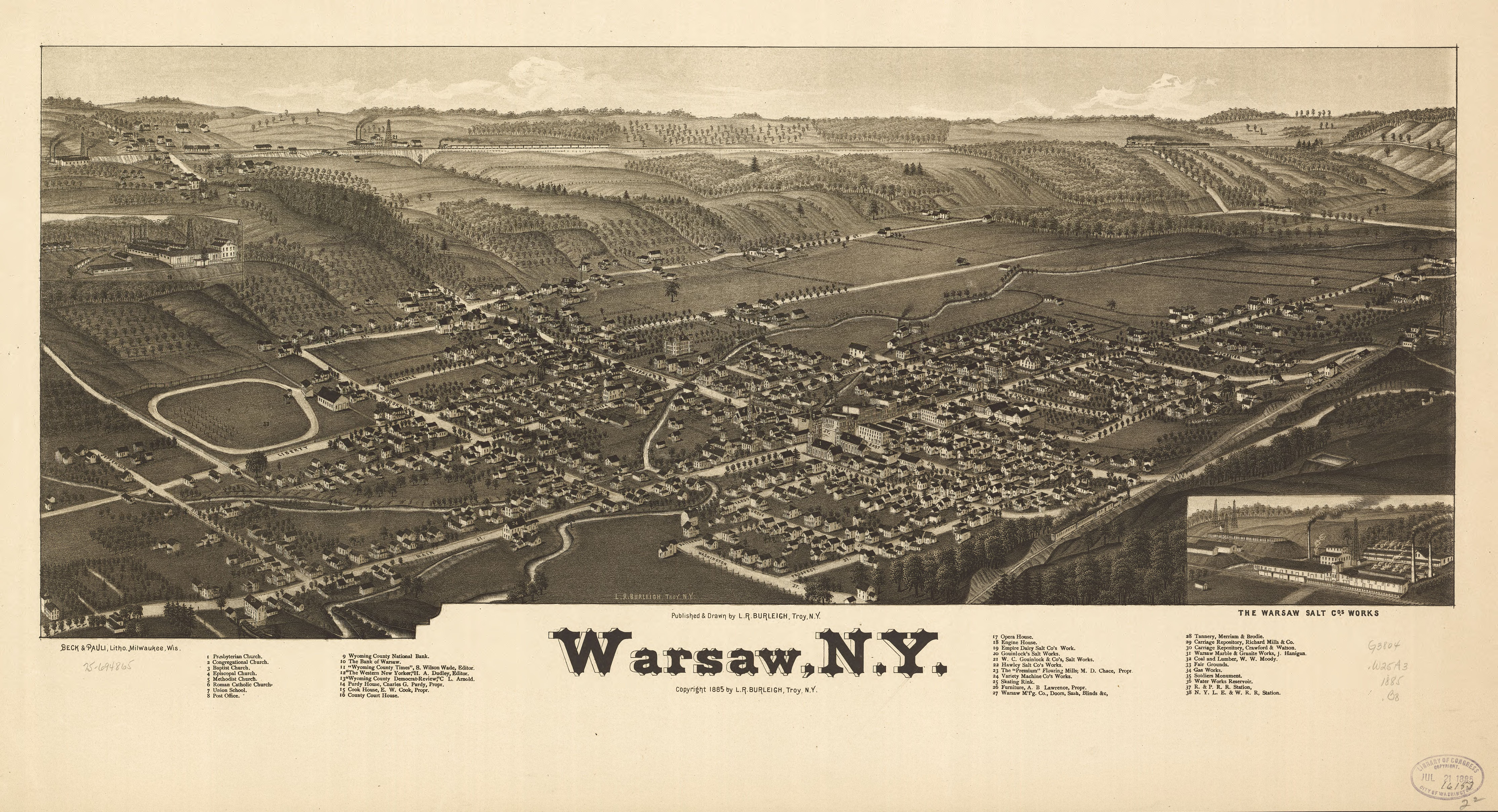
Warsaw, New York

Warwick, New York

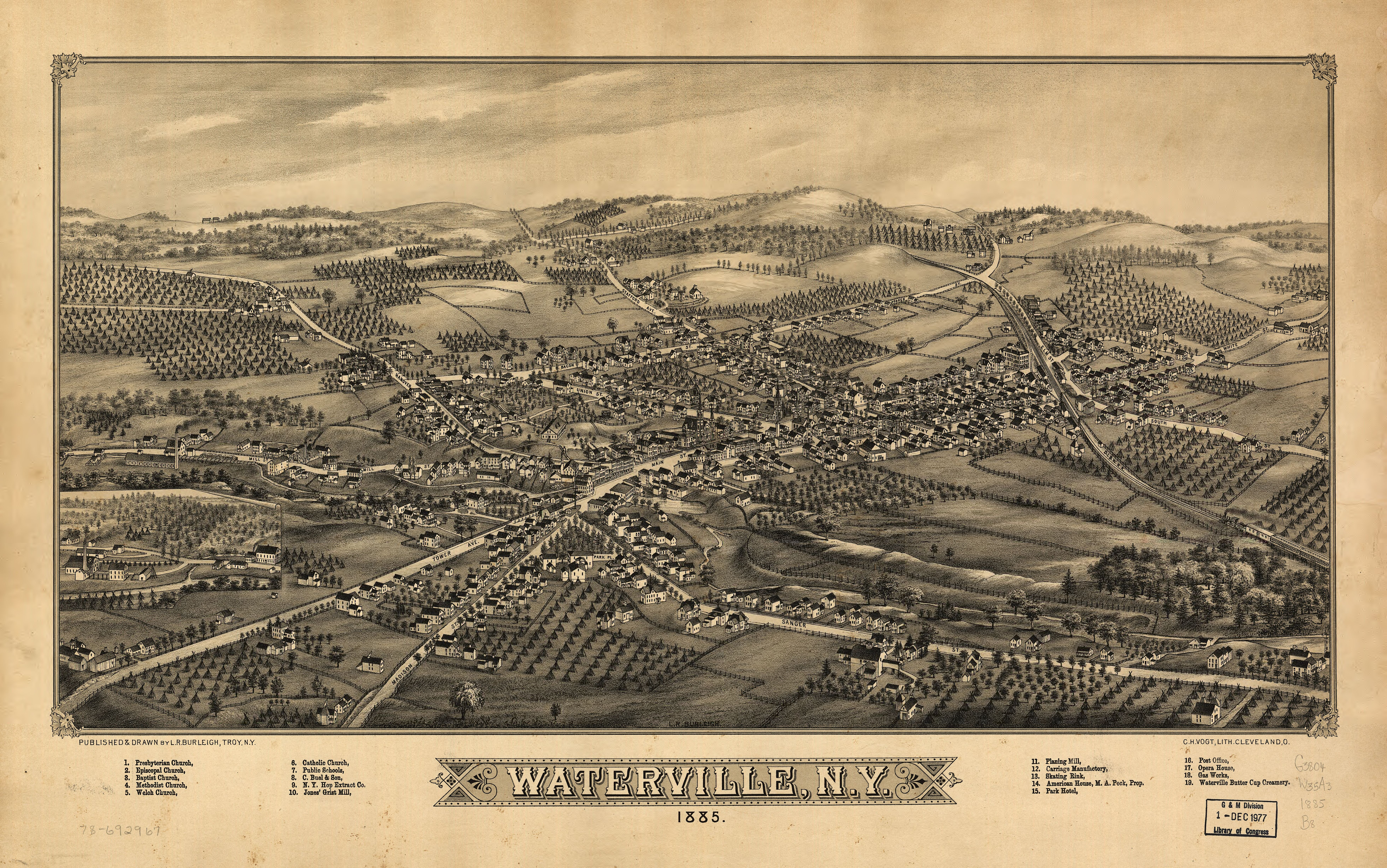
Waterville, New York

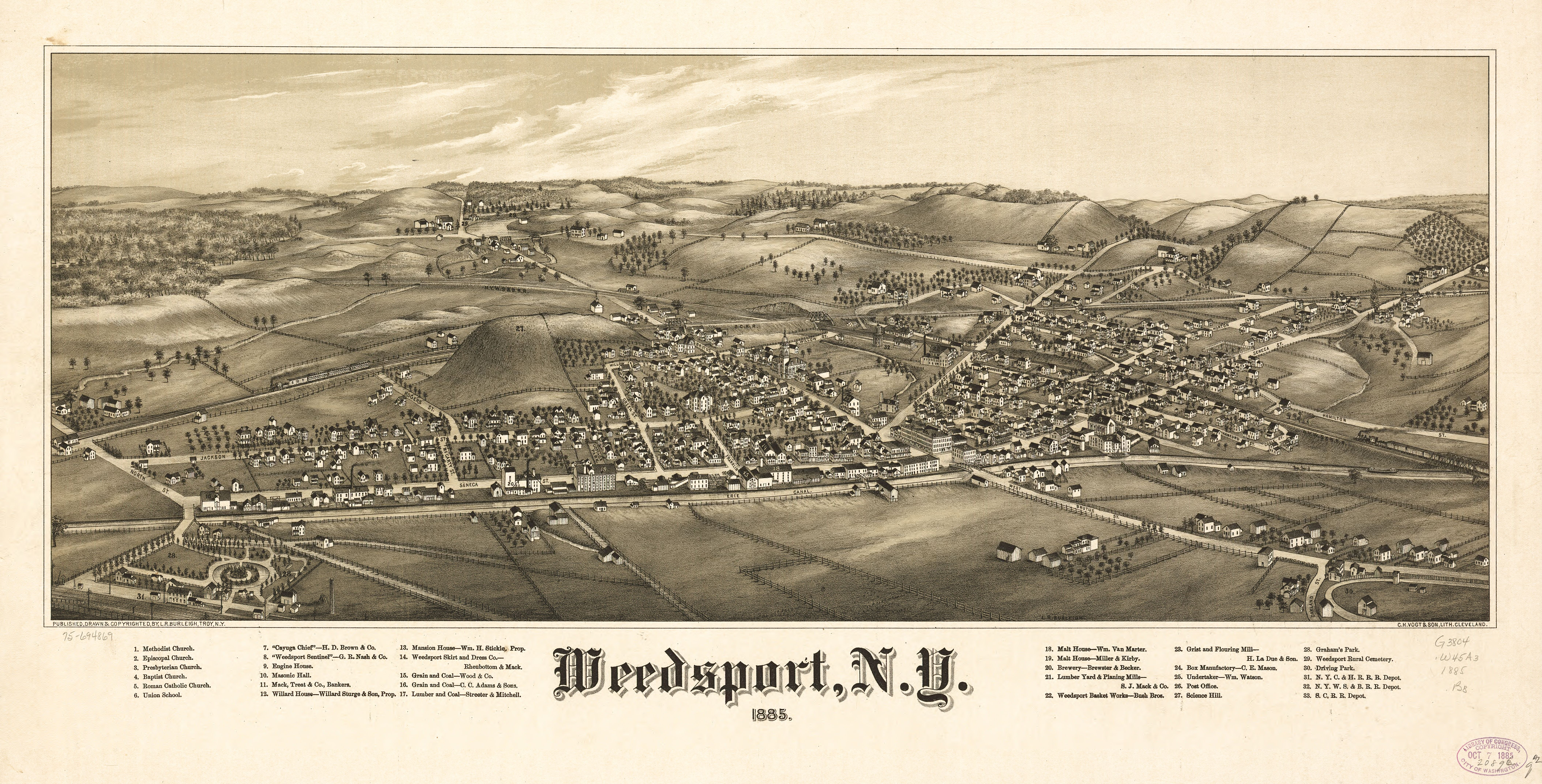
Weedsport, New York

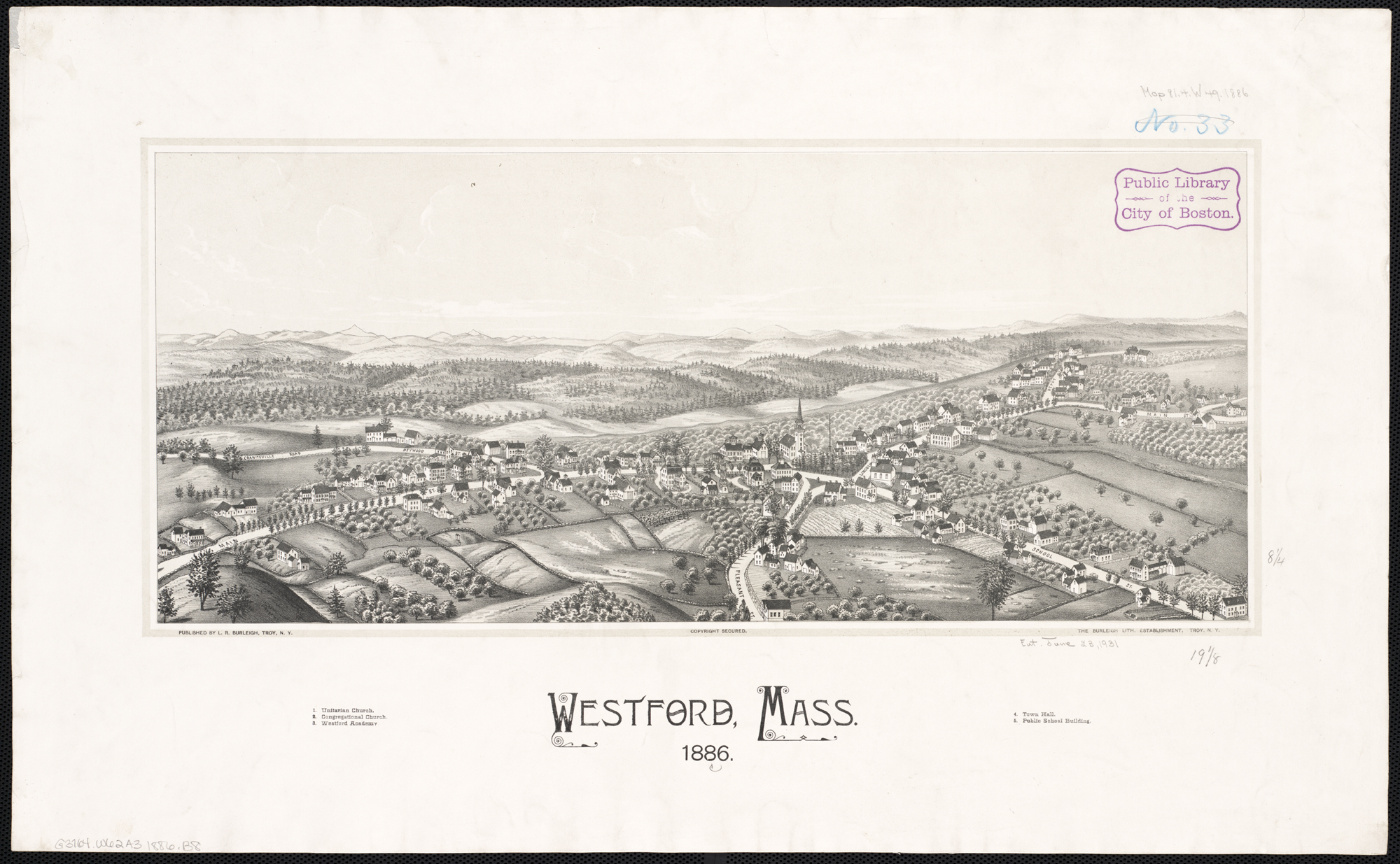
Westford, Massachusetts

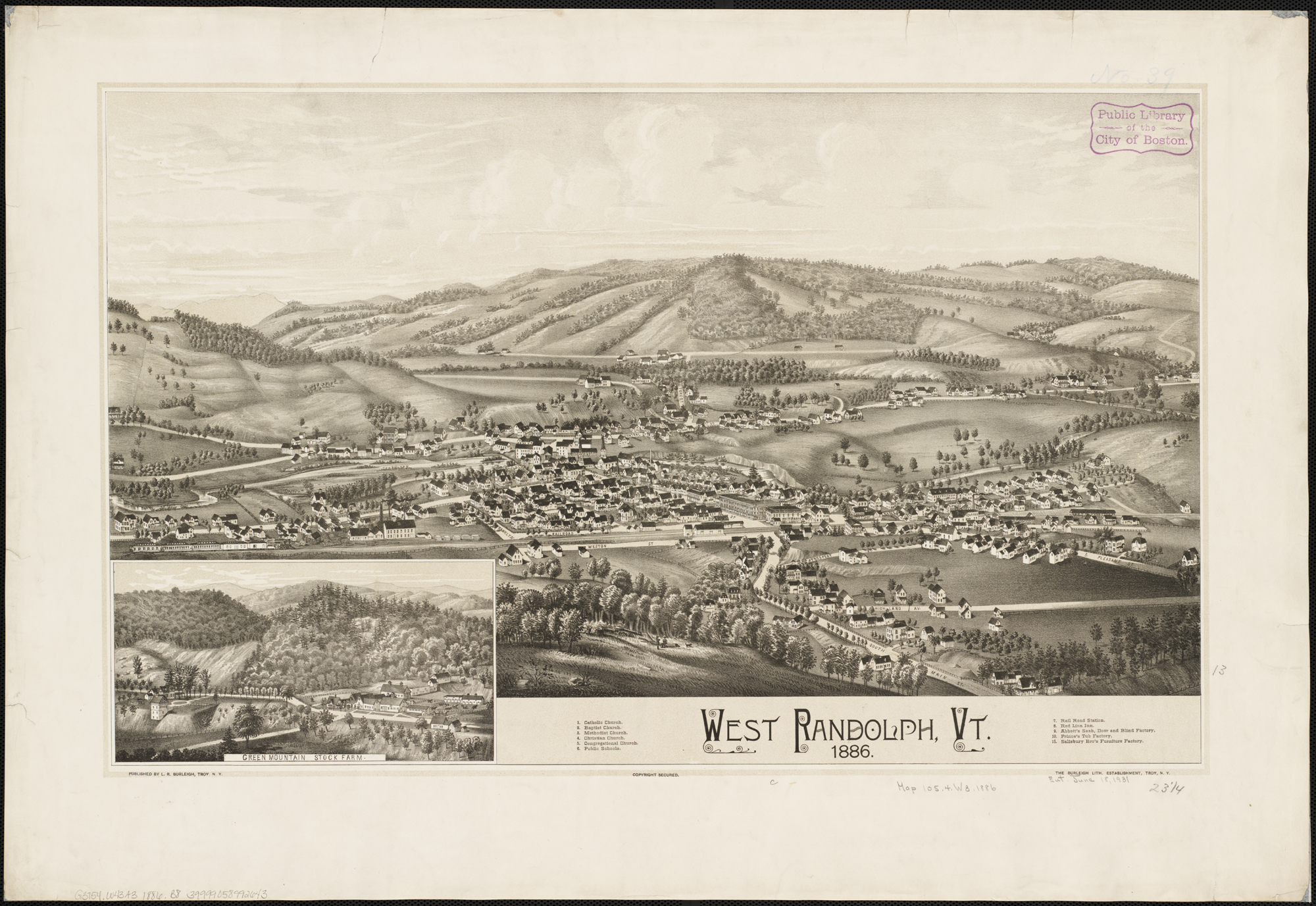
West Randolph, Vermont

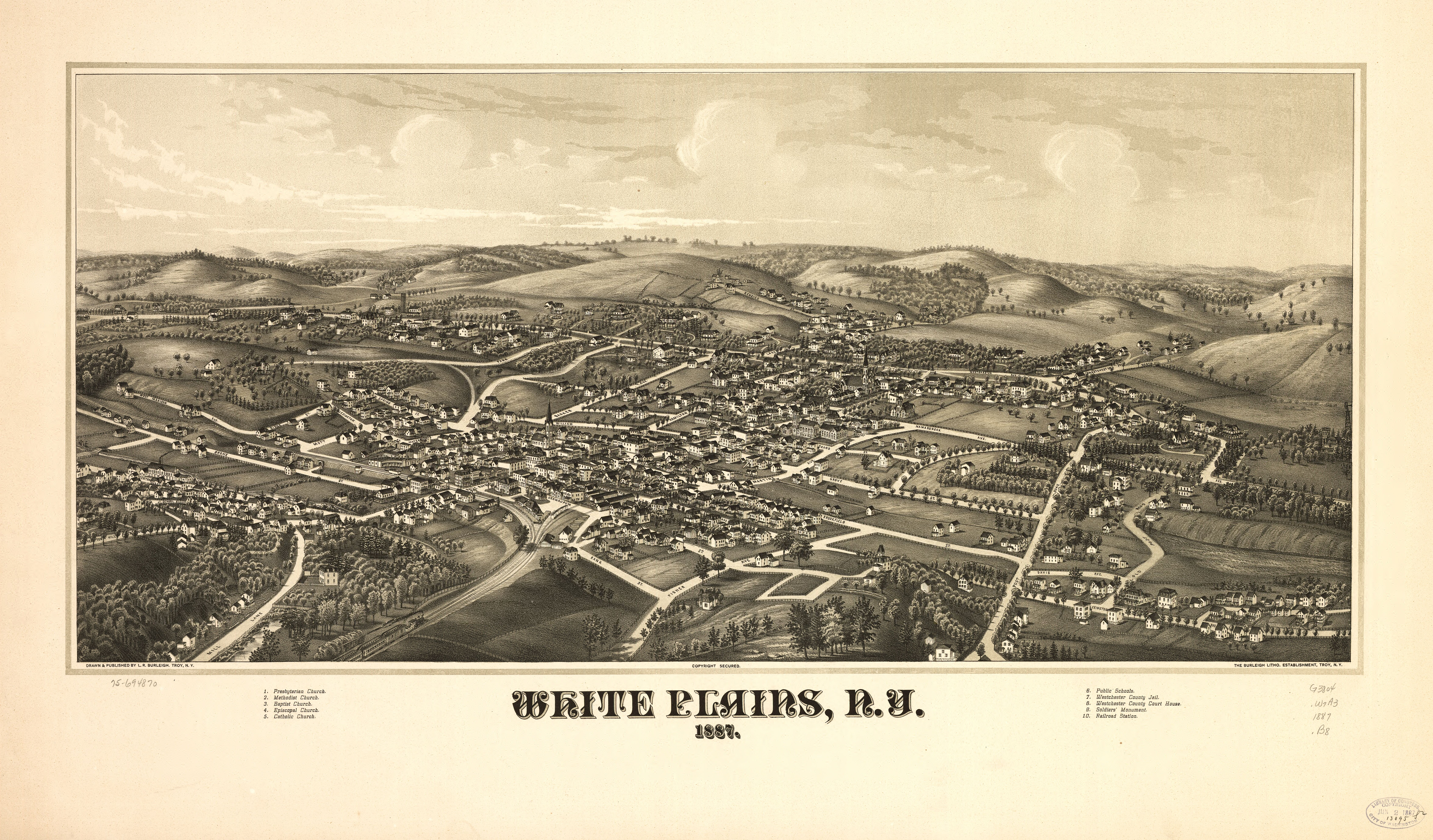
White Plains, New York

Whitesboro, New York

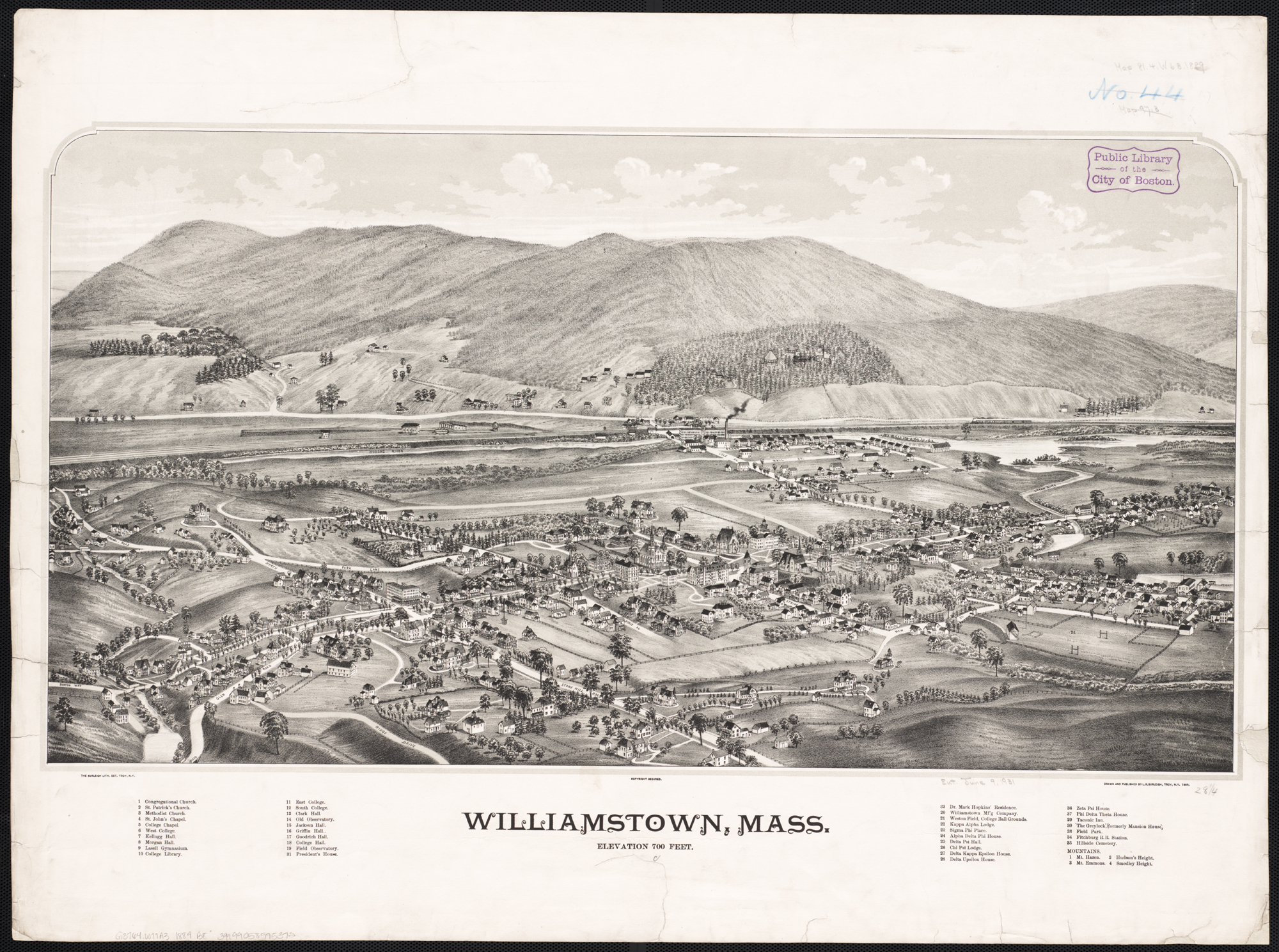
Williamstown, Massachusetts

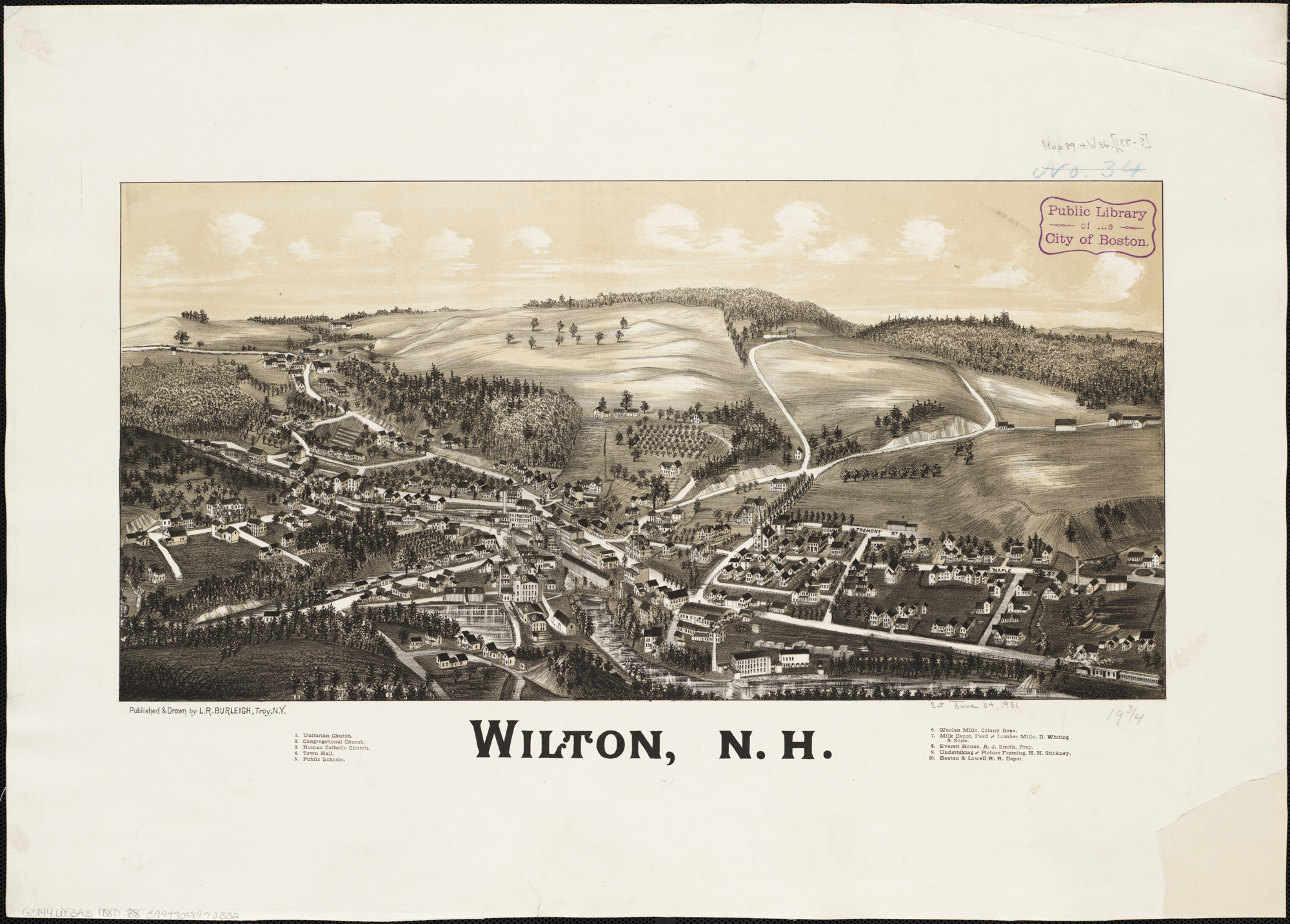
Wilton, New Hampshire

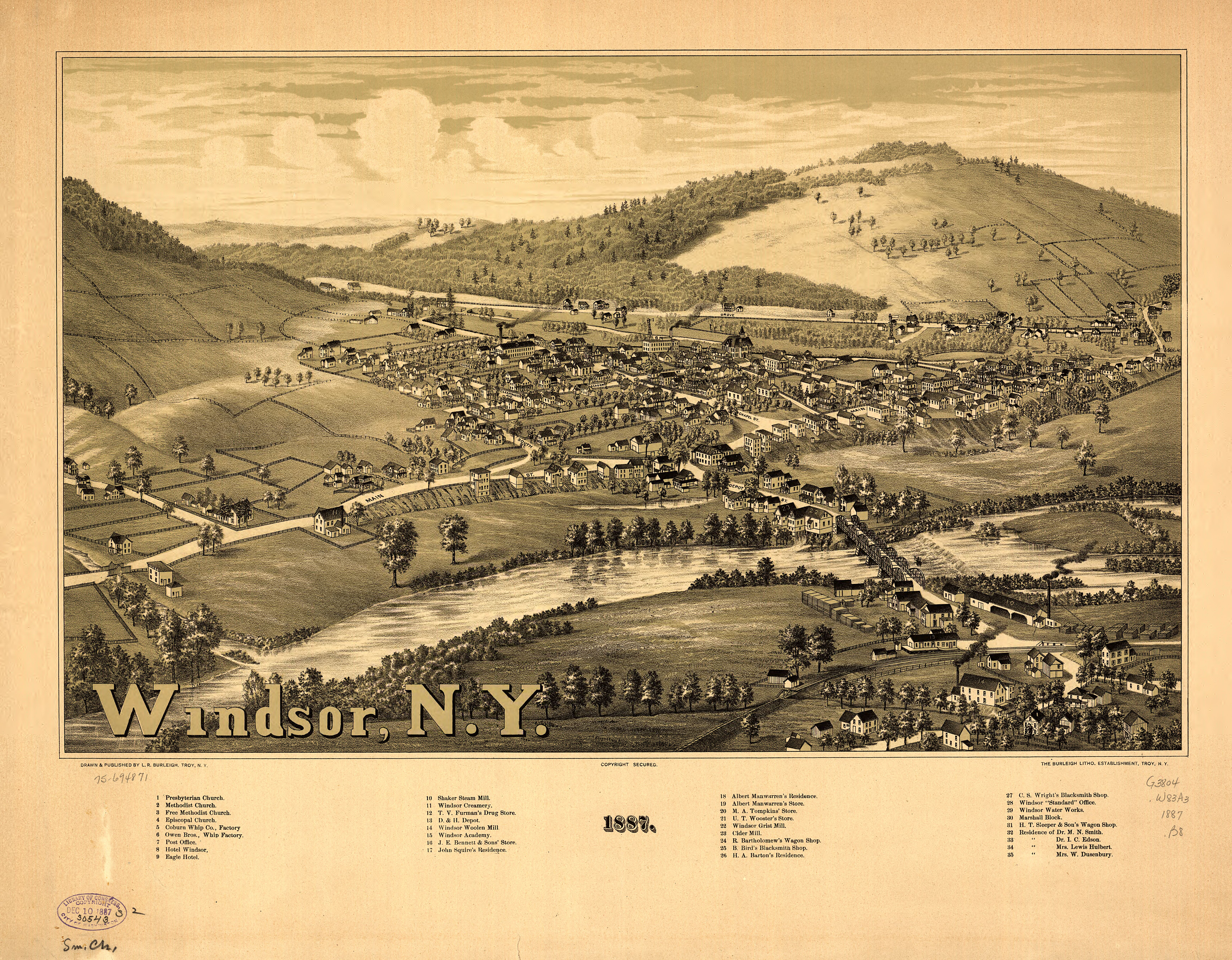
Windsor, New York

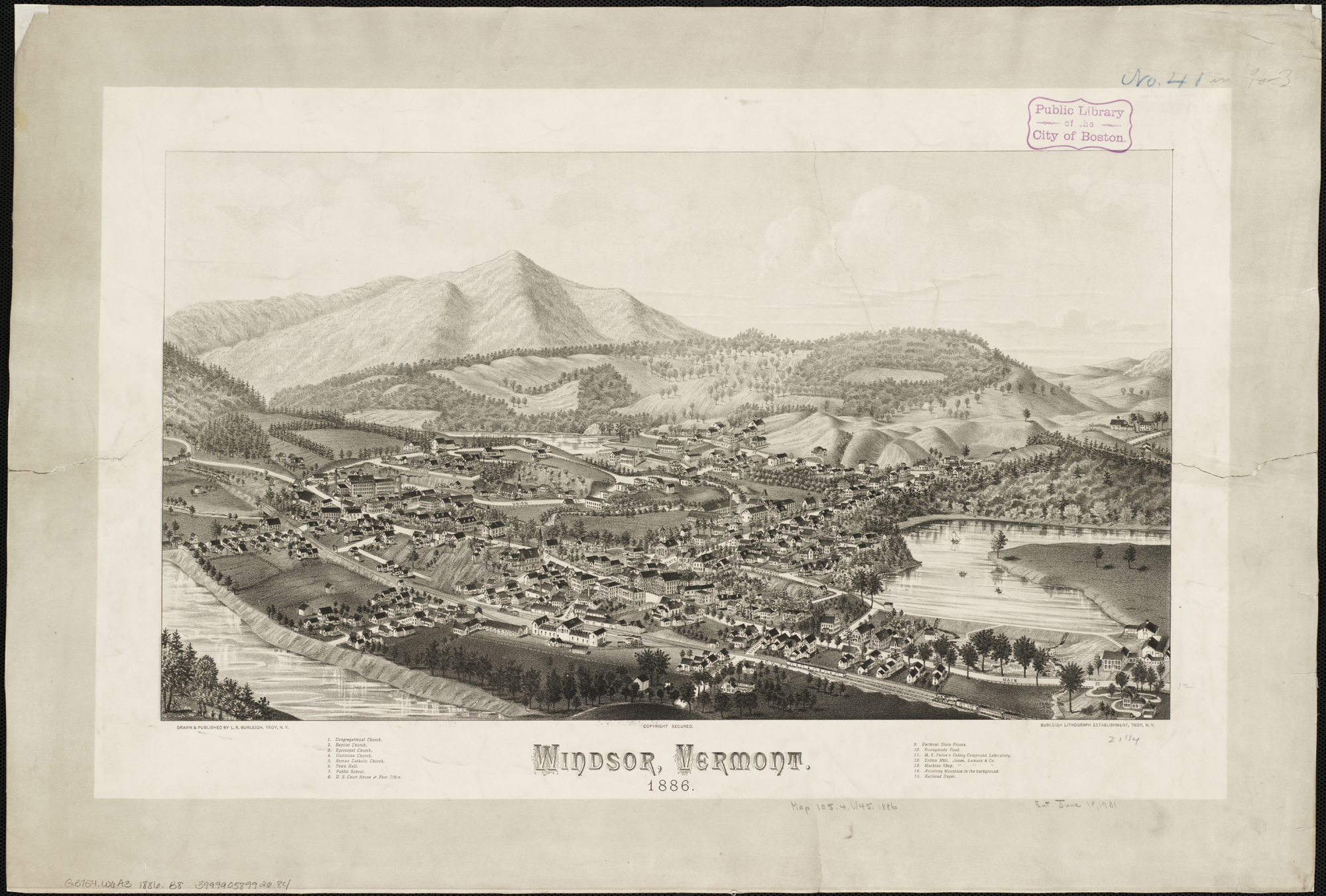
Windsor, Vermont

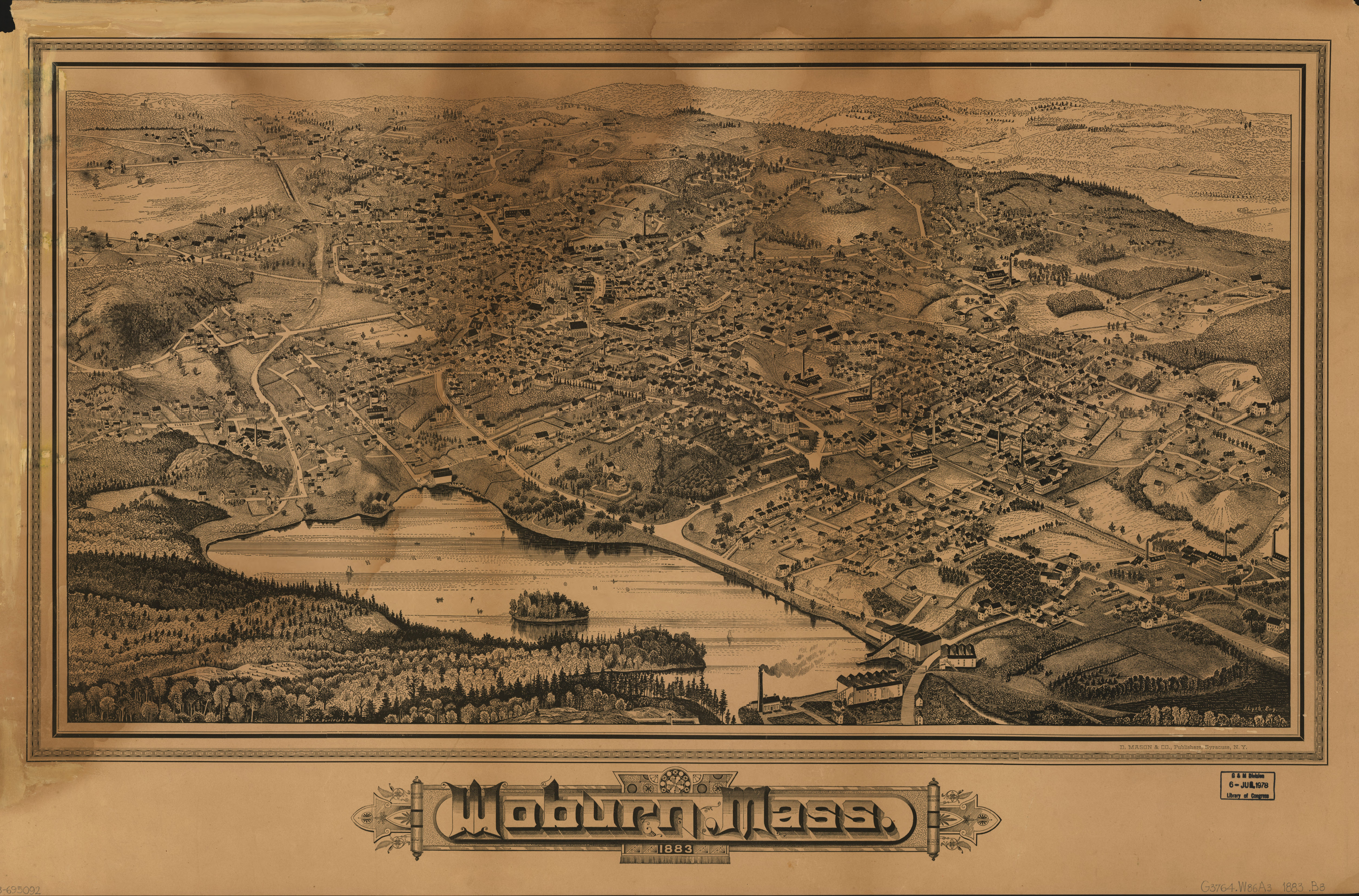
Woburn, Massachusetts J. Lyth engraver

== See also ==
- Thaddeus Mortimer Fowler
- Edwin Whitefield
