= 1880 in rail transport =

This article lists events related to rail transport that occurred in 1880.

== Events ==
=== February events ===
- February 9 – The Atchison, Topeka and Santa Fe Railroad, building southwestward from Kansas, reaches Santa Fe, New Mexico.
- February 12 – The Tawas and Bay County Railroad in Michigan purchases the Lake Huron and Southwestern Railway.
- February 18 – Adna Anderson succeeds William Milnor Roberts as Engineer-in-Chief of Northern Pacific Railway.

=== March events ===
- March 20
  - The first Southern Pacific Railroad train reaches Tucson, Arizona.
  - The Miami Valley Railway is sold from receivership to the Toledo, Delphos and Burlington railway.
- March 27 – The Denver and Rio Grande Western Railroad, Atchison, Topeka and Santa Fe Railway and Union Pacific Railroad reach an agreement to end hostilities over track construction in Colorado; in the Treaty of Boston, the D&RG agrees that it will not build tracks south of Española, New Mexico, the Santa Fe agrees that it will not build tracks into either Denver or Leadville for ten years, and the Union Pacific agrees not to build any track in the Colorado Rockies.

=== April events ===
- April 15 – The Atchison, Topeka and Santa Fe Railroad, building southwestward from Kansas, reaches Albuquerque, New Mexico.

=== May events ===
- May 11 – Mussel Slough Tragedy: A land dispute between the Southern Pacific Railroad and settlers in Hanford, California, turns deadly when a gun battle breaks out, leaving 7 dead.
- May 13 – In Menlo Park, New Jersey, Thomas Edison performs the first test of his electric railway.

=== June events ===
- June 8 – The Miami Valley Railway is reincorporated as the Cincinnati Northern Railway.
- June 15 – Rebuilt Berlin Anhalter Bahnhof in Germany opened.
- June 18 – First section of railroad in Guatemala begins operation, connecting Puerto San José and Escuintla (914 mm (3 ft) gauge).

=== July events ===
- July 1 – The Callander and Oban Railway is opened throughout to Oban in Scotland.
- July 2 – The first revenue trains reach Leadville, Colorado, on the Denver, South Park and Pacific Railroad.
- July 10 – The California Southern Railroad is organized to build a rail connection between San Diego and a connection with the Atlantic and Pacific Railroad in California.
- July 20 – Construction on the Denver and Rio Grande Railroad reaches Leadville, Colorado.

=== August ===
- August 11 – The Wennington Junction rail crash in England kills 8 people.

=== October events ===
- October 1 – The Atchison, Topeka and Santa Fe Railroad, building southwestward from Kansas, reaches San Marcial, New Mexico.
- October 23 – Following its organization in July, the California Southern Railroad is officially chartered.

=== Unknown date events ===
- Summer – The Atlantic and Pacific Railroad, later to become part of the Atchison, Topeka and Santa Fe Railroad, begins construction west of Albuquerque, New Mexico.
- Eugene V. Debs becomes the Grand Secretary of American labor organization Brotherhood of Locomotive Firemen.
- The Richmond and West Point Terminal Railway and Warehouse Company is chartered as a holding company to acquire railroads that the Richmond and Danville Railroad itself couldn't.
- Lima Machine Works ships the first Shay locomotive to Ephraim Shay's design to a logger in Grand Rapids, Michigan.
- Alonzo C. Mather forms the Mather Stock Car Company to build stock cars of his own design.
- The Peninsular Car Company delivers the first refrigerator cars to Swift and Company, forming the basis of Swift Refrigerator Line.
- The Merchants Despatch enters the refrigerated transit business.
- Mexican President General Manuel González grants a rail concession to Albert Kinsey Owen to build the Chihuahua al Pacífico.
- Southern Pacific begins service to the Hotel Del Monte; the service will in turn become known as the Del Monte.

== Births ==
=== June births ===
- June 21 – Josiah Stamp, Chairman of the London, Midland and Scottish Railway 1926–1941 (d. 1941).

== Deaths ==
=== January deaths ===
- January 1 – Morris Ketchum, partner in Rogers, Ketchum and Grosvenor, director of Illinois Central Railroad (b. 1796).

=== December deaths ===
- December 1 – Thomas Seavey Hall, American inventor of railroad signalling systems (b. 1827).
