= Caleb Alexander =

Caleb Alexander, D.D. (1755 – April 1828), a native of Northfield, Massachusetts, and a graduate of Yale University in 1777, was ordained at New Marlborough, Massachusetts, in 1781, and dismissed in 1782. He was again settled at Mendon, Massachusetts, and dismissed in 1803.

After an ineffectual attempt to establish a college at Fairfield, New York, erecting buildings, which later became part of the medical school, he took the charge of the academy at Onondaga Hollow, where he died in April 1828.

He published An Essay on the Real Deity of Jesus Christ: To which are Added Strictures on Extracts from Mr. Emlyn's Humble Inquiry Concerning the Deity of Jesus Christ, 1791; a Latin grammar, 1794; an English grammar, and grammatical elements, the Columbian Dictionary of the English Language (1800), and Young Ladies and Gentleman's Instructor.

Scholar Peter Martin named the Columbian Dictionary of the English Language the second US-published dictionary in English. His 550-page dictionary contained many words unique to the United States. Despite advertising "many new words peculiar to the United States", Martin writes that it was largely taken from Samuel Johnson Jr.'s American dictionary that had been published two to three years prior. While it was more commercially successful than Johnson and Noah Webster's contemporary dictionaries, it faced similar critical criticism; one reviewer described the dictionary as "disgusting collection" of words from "the boors of each local jurisdiction in the United States."
