= Cattle wagon =

Railway vehicle designed to carry livestock

A cattle wagon or a livestock wagon is a type of railway vehicle designed to carry livestock. Within the classification system of the International Union of Railways they fall under Class H - special covered wagons - which, in turn are part of the group of covered goods wagons, although cattle have historically also been transported in open goods wagons. The American equivalent is called a stock car.

== Background ==
Moving live animals, particularly cattle and horses by rail, has occurred since the foundation of the railways, but few cattle or horse wagons survive due to the acidic nature of manure. Wagons with special bays or stalls were only used for the transport of racing horses whilst small livestock, such as sheep, goats, poultry and rabbits were transported in livestock wagons with slatted sides and/or hutches. Originally high-sided wagons were also used to move cattle as well as horses and pigs. For the transport of military horses in goods wagons, tethering rings were fitted. The transportation of large and small animals required special fittings – air vents, means of tethering, drinking facilities and viewing ports – in order to avoid quantitative and qualitative losses. Even troops were transported in covered goods wagons.

Cattle wagons

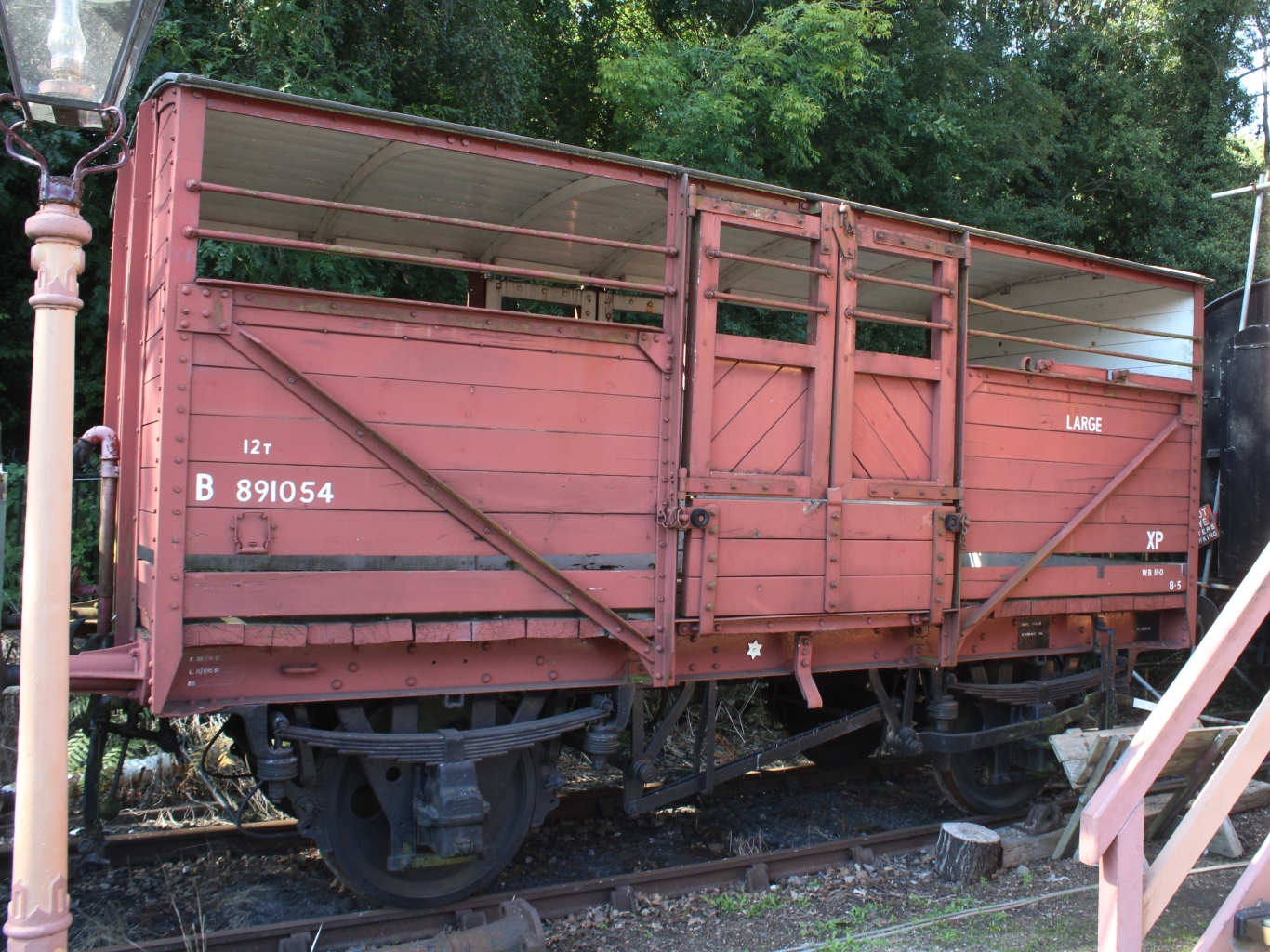
Early example of a cattle wagon preserved on the Severn Valley Railway

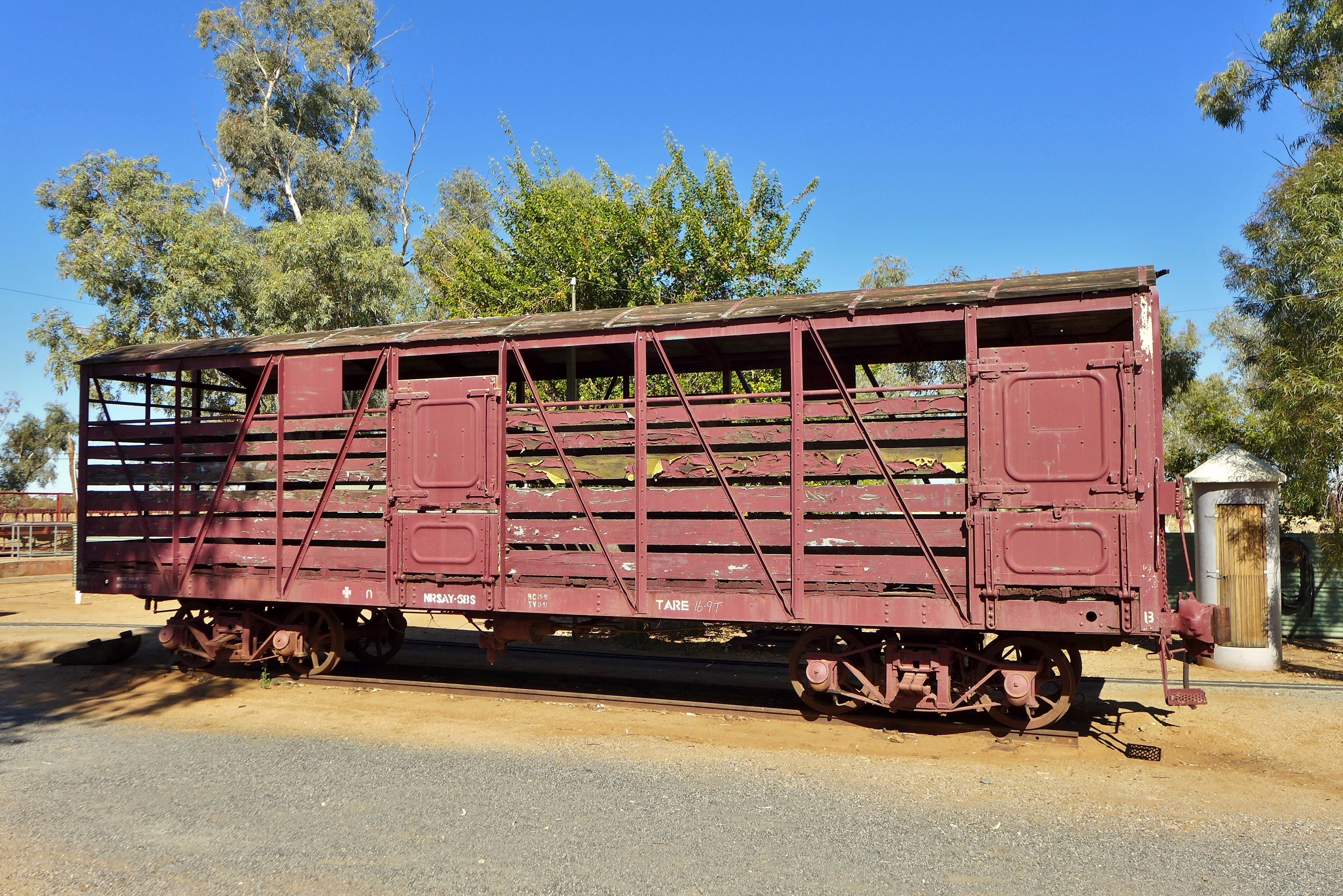
Cattle wagon Alice Springs

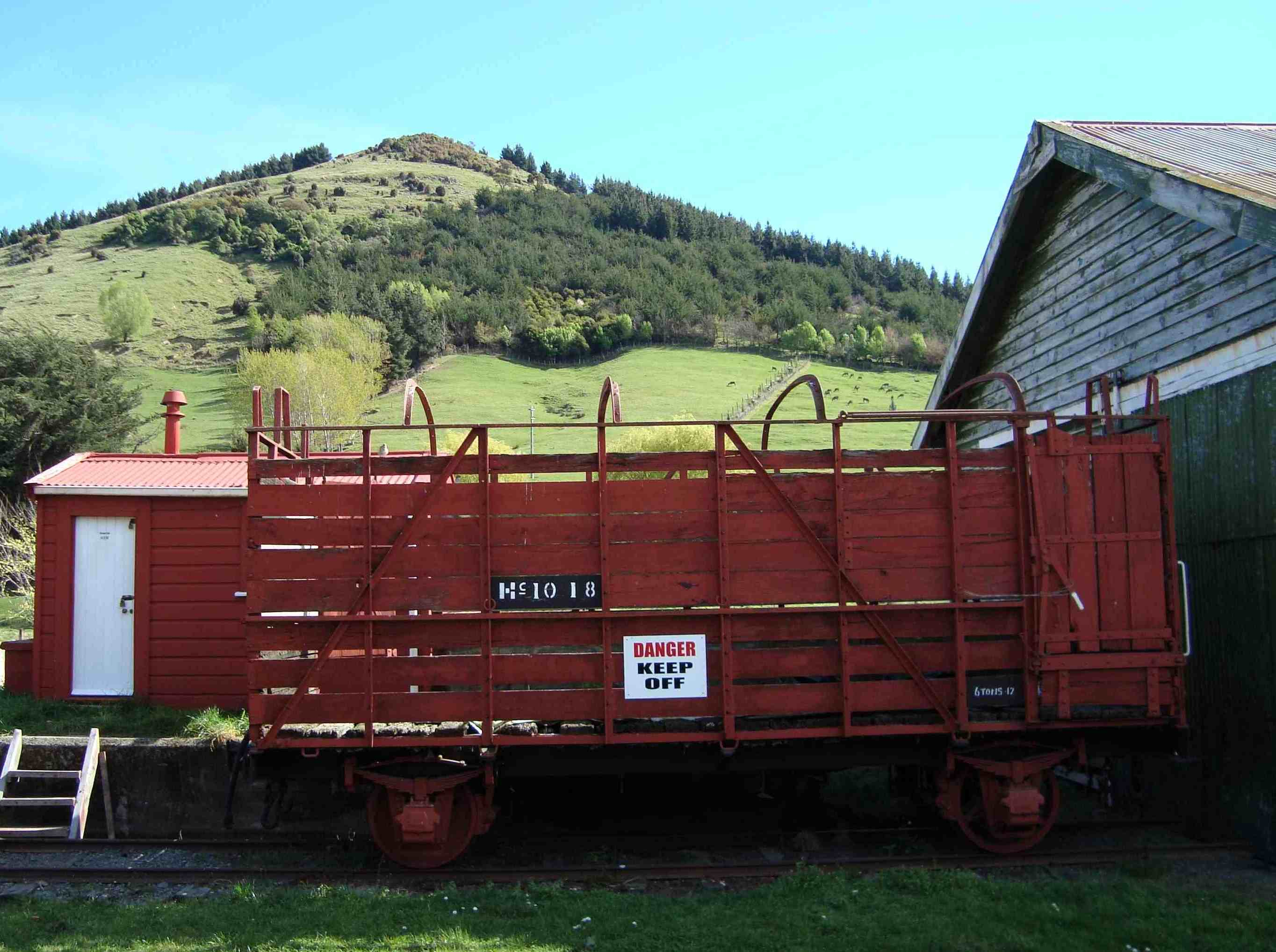
Hc Class cattle wagon HC1018 and ganger's hut (on loading bank) at Little River Station. A notable omission are the running boards that should be on top of the roof.

== UK racehorse transportation ==
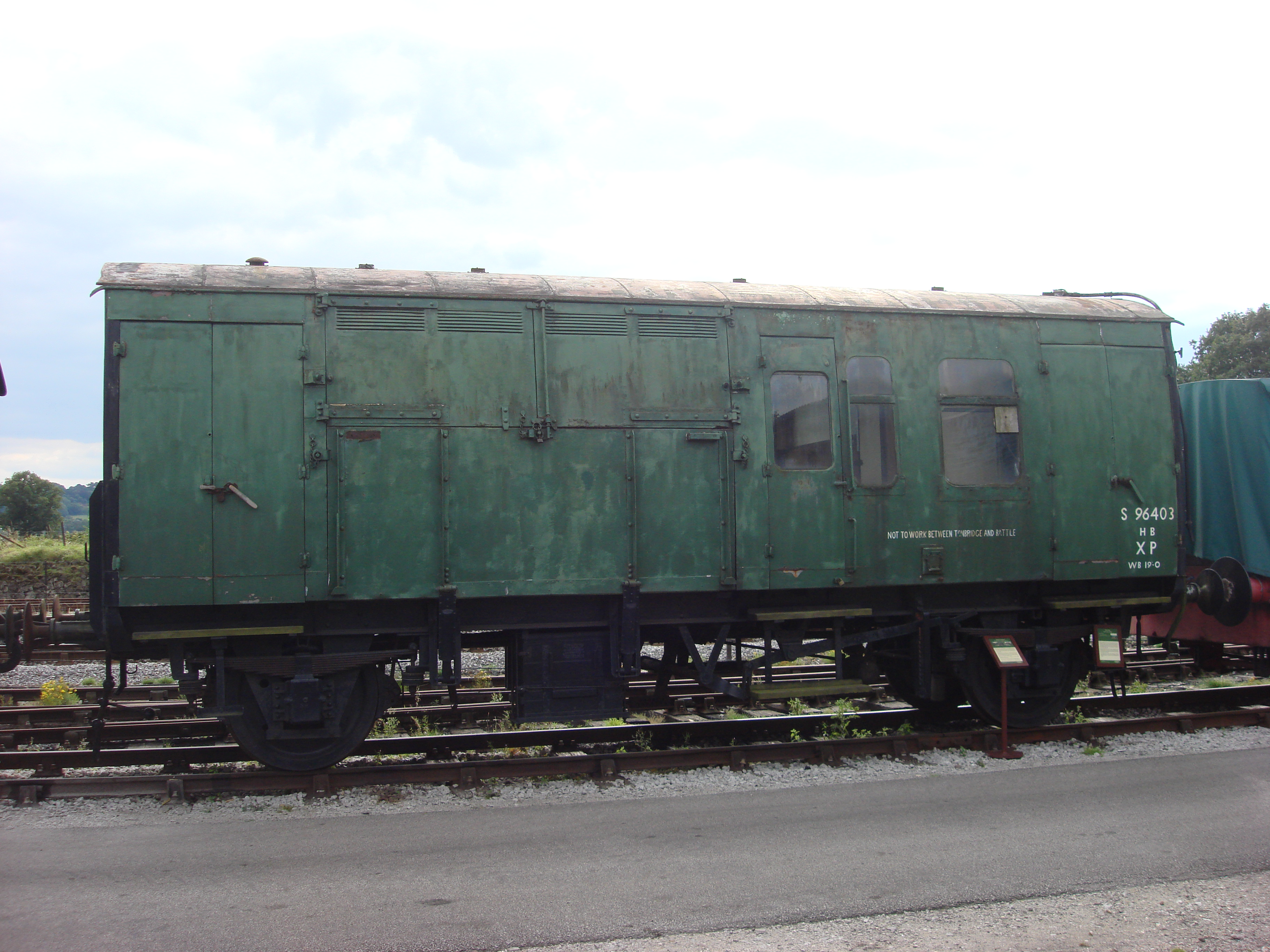
BR Horse box S96403

As horse racing became a serious business based on science from the 17th century onwards, transport of racehorses became a lucrative business. Having started using slow horse-drawn carts on muddy roads, in the late 19th century railways became a viable option for shipping racehorses quickly over longer distances. It also meant that racehorses could attend more meetings in better condition. However, railway companies used the same open and roughly built wagons for shipping racehorses that they used for cattle. In 1905, former president of the Royal College of Veterinary Surgeons J Wortley Axe wrote that loud conditions on board and short tethers used to restrain the animals seemed intentionally designed to spook horses. Hence the stables and railway companies introduced the protective leg wraps, shipping blankets, and head bumpers which are common today.

After World War 2, whilst the need to transport live cattle decreased in the UK, with no motorway network yet developed, the need to transport high-value racehorses increased. As a result, based on the design of the British Railways Mark 1 railway carriage (which could travel at high speed within passenger trains), in 1952 BR released into traffic a new specifically designed racehorse transport wagon. It could carry up to three horses, plus accommodation including washing and sleeping facilities for a groom and a sidesman. During their short life, the wagons carried the horses of: the Household Cavalry from Kensington to Bangor for the Investiture of the Prince of Wales at Caernarfon; the Royal Horse Artillery to Ludgershall; the King's Troop to Holyhead; and a touring company of the Royal Canadian Mounted Police. With decreasing railway access to many horse racing tracks, and a change in BR policy on animals and their transportation, the wagons were withdrawn in 1972, the last live animals carried on British railways.

== Use for deportation ==
Given their dimensions and features, cattle wagons have been used as vehicles for forced mass transfer and deportation of people. Holocaust trains were railway transports run by the Deutsche Reichsbahn national railway system under the strict supervision of the German Nazis and their allies, for the purpose of forcible deportation of the Jews, as well as other victims of the Holocaust, to the German Nazi concentration, forced labour, and extermination camps.

Deportation wagons

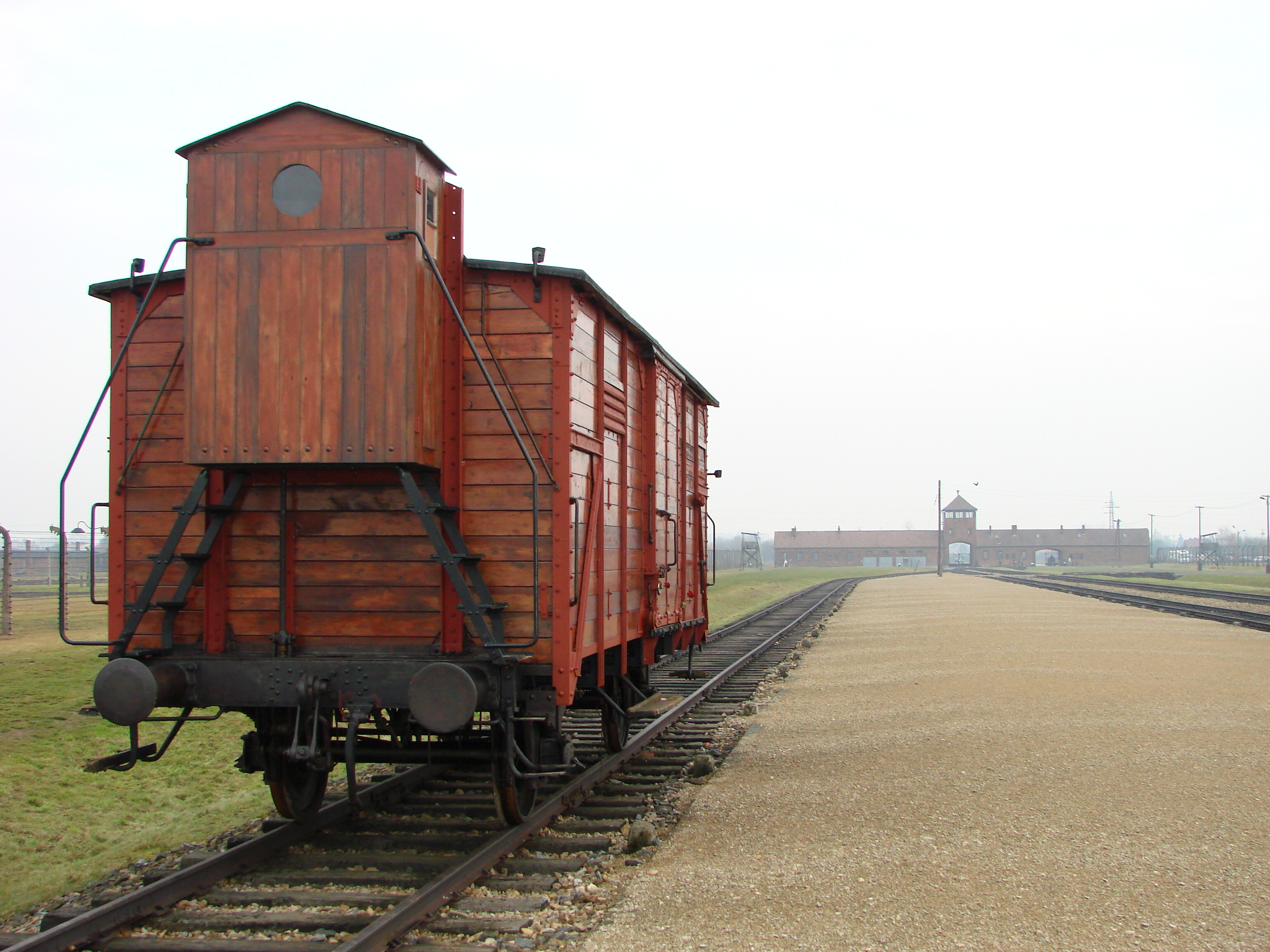
Cattle wagon with brakeman's cabin on siding in Auschwitz.

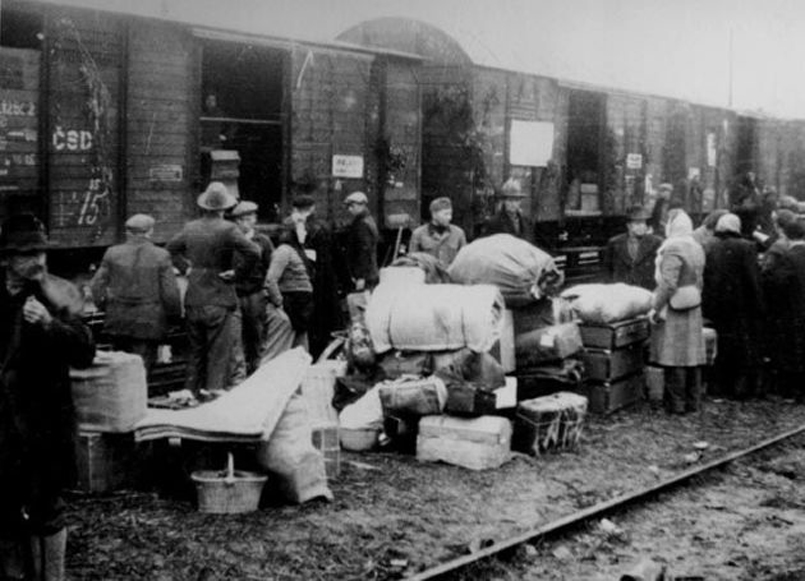
People being deported in cattle cars during World War II.

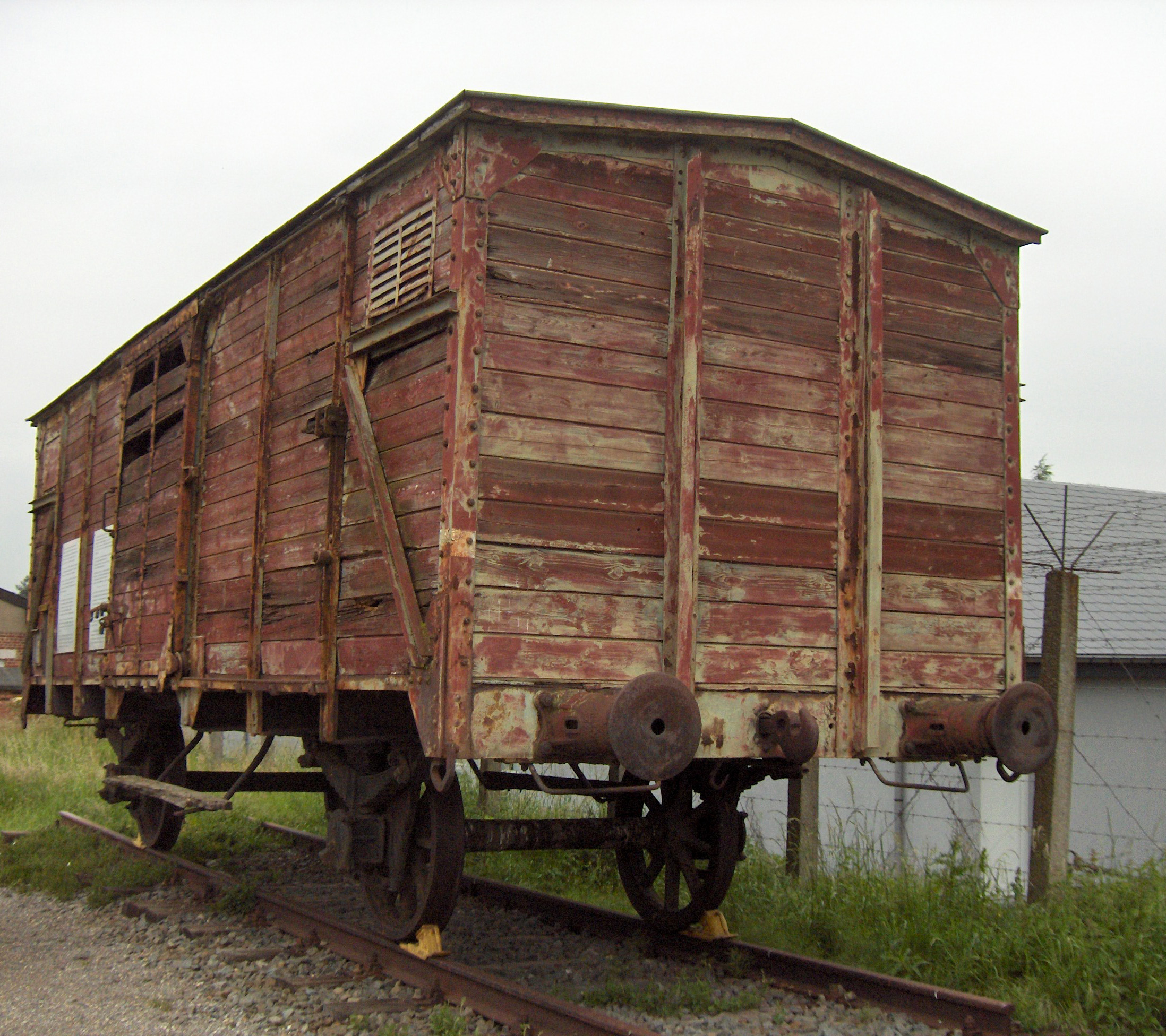
A cattle wagon used for the transport of Belgian Jews to camps in Eastern Europe. The openings were covered in barbed wire. This example is preserved at Fort Breendonk.

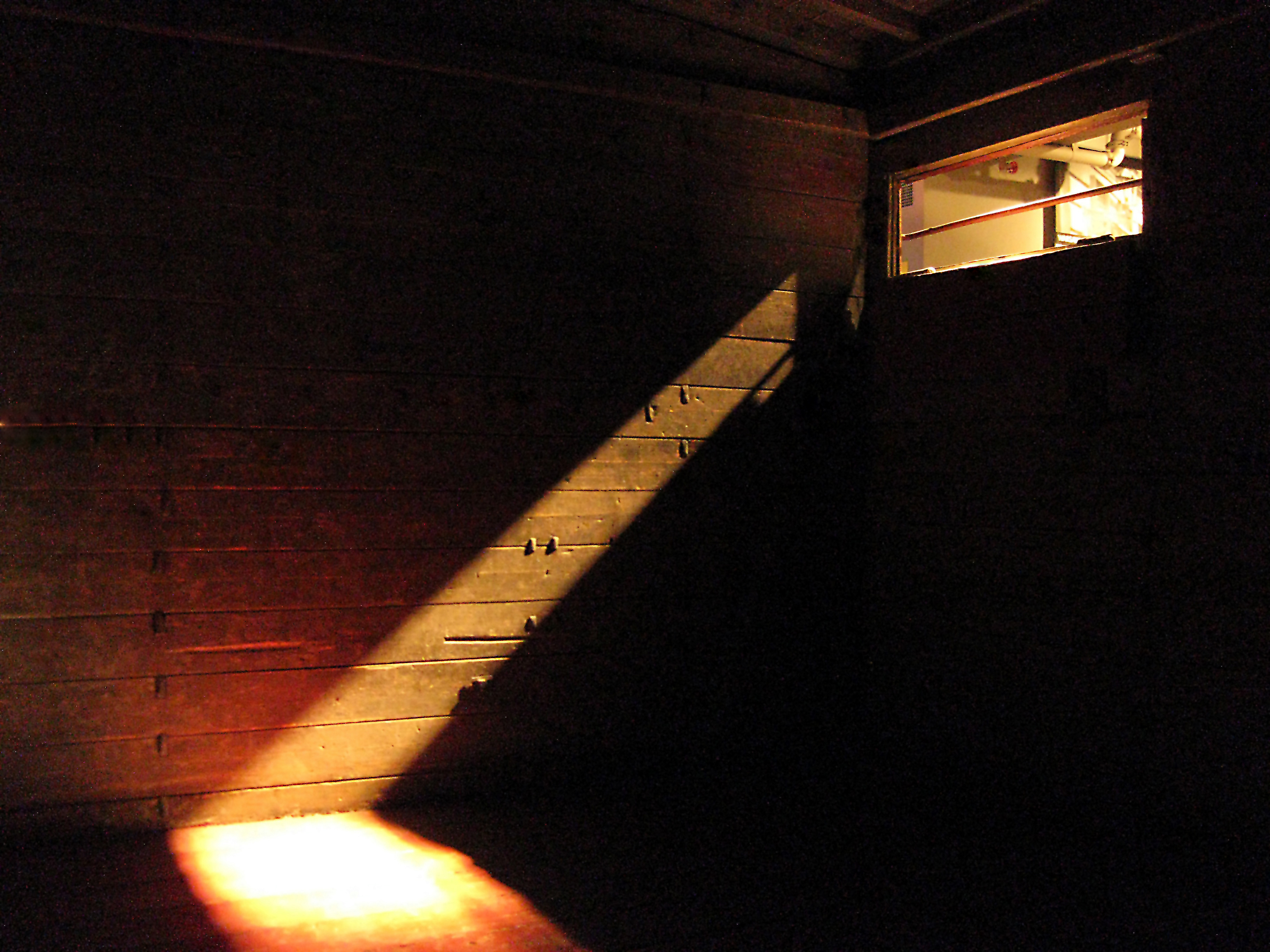
Interior of a covered goods wagon used to transport Jews and other Holocaust victims, the United States Holocaust Memorial Museum in Washington, D.C.

Cattle wagons were used for forced settlement and population transfer in the Soviet Union in the mid-20th century.

Following the end of World War II in Europe, ethnic Germans were expelled from Czechoslovakia in cattle wagons.

== See also ==
- Horse wagon
- Livestock trailer
- Stock car (rail)
