= Fairfield Academy =

Defunct academy in Fairfield, NY

- Active: 1802–1901
- Location: Fairfield, New York, US

Fairfield Academy was an academy that existed for nearly one hundred years in the Town of Fairfield, Herkimer County, New York.

== Founding ==
It was organized as an academy for men in 1802, when the community was an active local manufacturing center. The New York State Board of Regents granted the academy a charter in 1803. In 1804 Eunice Dennie Burr bought nine shares of the academy for $5 on the condition that young women would be allowed to attend classes.

In 1812, the trustees of Fairfield Academy, acting on the suggestion of the Rev. Amos G. Baldwin, petitioned Trinity Episcopal Church in Fairfield for a grant of funds to establish a college of liberal culture under Episcopal auspices. This petition was not granted, but in the following year, acting upon another petition suggested by the Rev. Baldwin, the corporation of Trinity church founded a theological school in connection with Fairfield Academy. By 1818, Bishop John Henry Hobart of the Episcopal Diocese of New York saw a need to establish a school of liberal culture, as well as a theological school, in the western portion of the diocese. Hobart formed a plan to transfer the Theological School from Fairfield to Geneva, New York in connection with a “college and printing press” to be established there. In 1821 the transfer was made, and the Rev. Daniel McDonald, D.D., the principal of the Theological School in Fairfield, relocated to Geneva. The relocated theological school formed the nucleus of what later became Hobart and William Smith Colleges.

The academy was reorganized as the co-educational Fairfield Seminary in 1839, incorporating a "Classical Academy and Female Collegiate Institute," with a teacher training and college preparation curriculum. Its enrollment in 1861 was 551. As new major transportation routes developed in the 19th Century, bypassing the Town of Fairfield, the academy lost its prominence. It operated as a military academy beginning in 1891. Fairfield Academy closed in 1901, largely due to competition from the growing number of high schools in the area. Its records are now archived at Syracuse University.

== Fairfield Medical College ==
From early in its existence, the academy had several instructors in medical subjects, including anatomy, pharmacy, medicine, surgery, and obstetrics.

In 1812, 43 students were studying medical subjects, so the Academy applied for a charter as a medical college in order to be able to grant M.D. degrees to its students. The charter was granted in 1812 under the name of "The College of Physicians and Surgeons of the Western District of New York," but the institution was commonly known as the Fairfield Medical College. This was the second medical college to be chartered in the state of New York, and the 11th in the United States. The faculty was composed of physicians and physician-instructors; the College acquired an excellent reputation. By 1833, the school had over 200 students, and over its life it granted more than 600 M.D. degrees; 18 of these students went on to become professors in other medical colleges. The first medical instructors at Geneva Medical College in Geneva, New York were connected with the medical school at Fairfield. Fairfield Medical College closed in 1840, due to competition from other medical colleges opening in New York and surrounding states.

== Notable alumni, faculty and founders ==
- Caleb Alexander
- Virgil Horace Barber
- Chauncey Boughton
- Theodric Romeyn Beck
- Philemon Bliss
- Alexander H. Buell
- Nehemiah H. Earll
- Asa Gray
- John Gorrie
- William Gulick
- Gerrit P. Judd
- Arphaxed Loomis
- Alonzo Clark Mather
- William Mather (1802–1890), the father of Alonzo Clark Mather, graduated from the Fairfield Medical College in 1826 with the degree of M.D. As he had from boyhood been "an ardent lover of the science of chemistry", he turned his attention to that subject and from 1828 to 1868 was one of the most popular lecturers in this country. In 1838 he was appointed instructor in chemistry at the Hamilton (New York) Literary and Theological Seminary and in 1841 was elected professor of chemistry at the Castleton (Vermont) Medical College. From 1852 to 1868 he was professor of chemistry, mineralogy, and geology at Madison University (now Colgate University).
- Charles S. Millington
- Walter G. Robinson (1879–1940), Adjutant General of New York
- John Swinburne
- Peter Joseph Wagner
- Squire Whipple
- Canvass White
- Marcus Whitman

== See also ==
- Hamilton College
