= Horse trailer =

Trailer used to transport horses

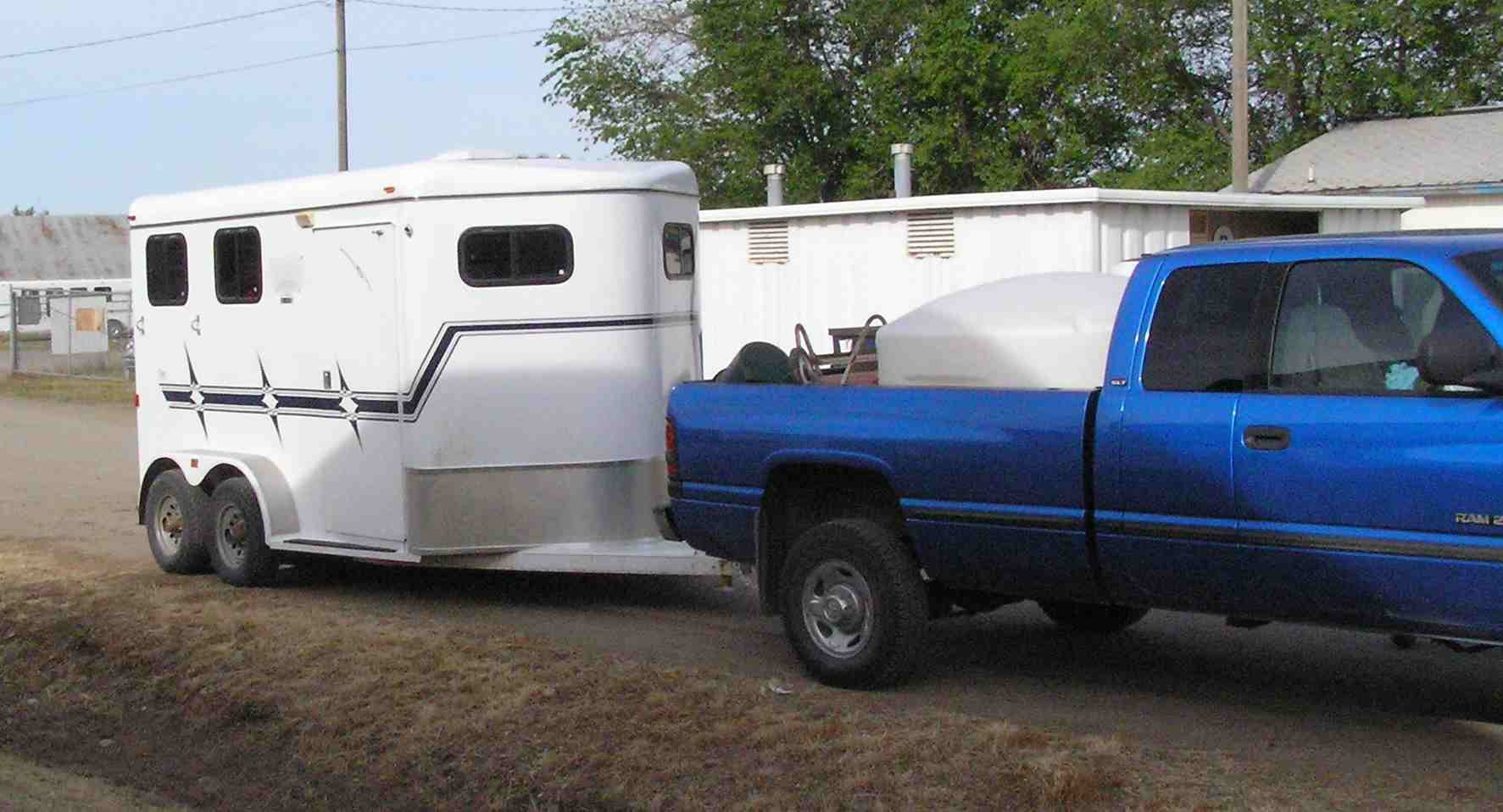
A bumper-pull horse trailer

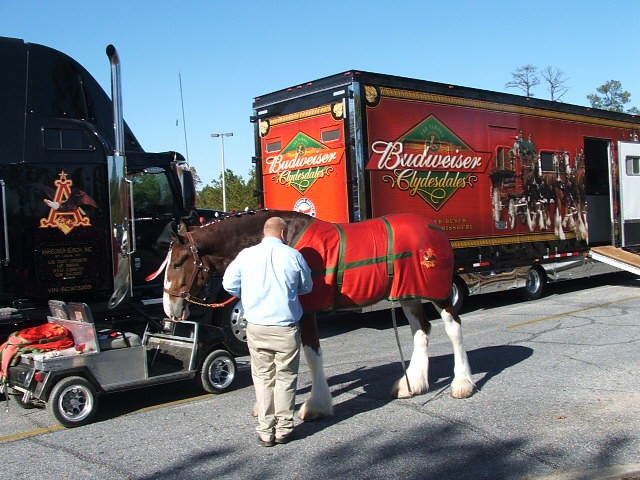
A state-of-the-art semi-trailer used to haul horses. Large trailers are attached with a fifth-wheel coupling.

A horse trailer or horse van (also called a horse float in Australia and New Zealand or horsebox in the British Isles) is used to transport horses. There are many different designs, ranging in size from small units capable of holding two or three horses, able to be pulled by a pickup truck or SUV; to gooseneck designs that carry six to eight horses, usually pulled by 1-ton dually-style pickups. There are also large semi-trailers that can haul a significant number of animals. In the UK, a horsebox may also refer to a motorised vehicle adapted to carry horses (generally known as a horse van in North America or Australasia), or a railway vehicle specifically designed to carry horses.

The least expensive type of trailer is the stock trailer, a trailer designed for cattle that is enclosed on the bottom but has slits at roughly the eye level of the animals to allow ventilation. Trailers designed specifically for horses are more elaborate. Because horses are usually hauled for the purpose of competition or work, where they must arrive in peak physical condition, horse trailers are designed for the comfort and safety of the animals. They usually have adjustable vents and windows, padded partitions, as well as suspension designed to provide a smooth ride and less stress on the animals.

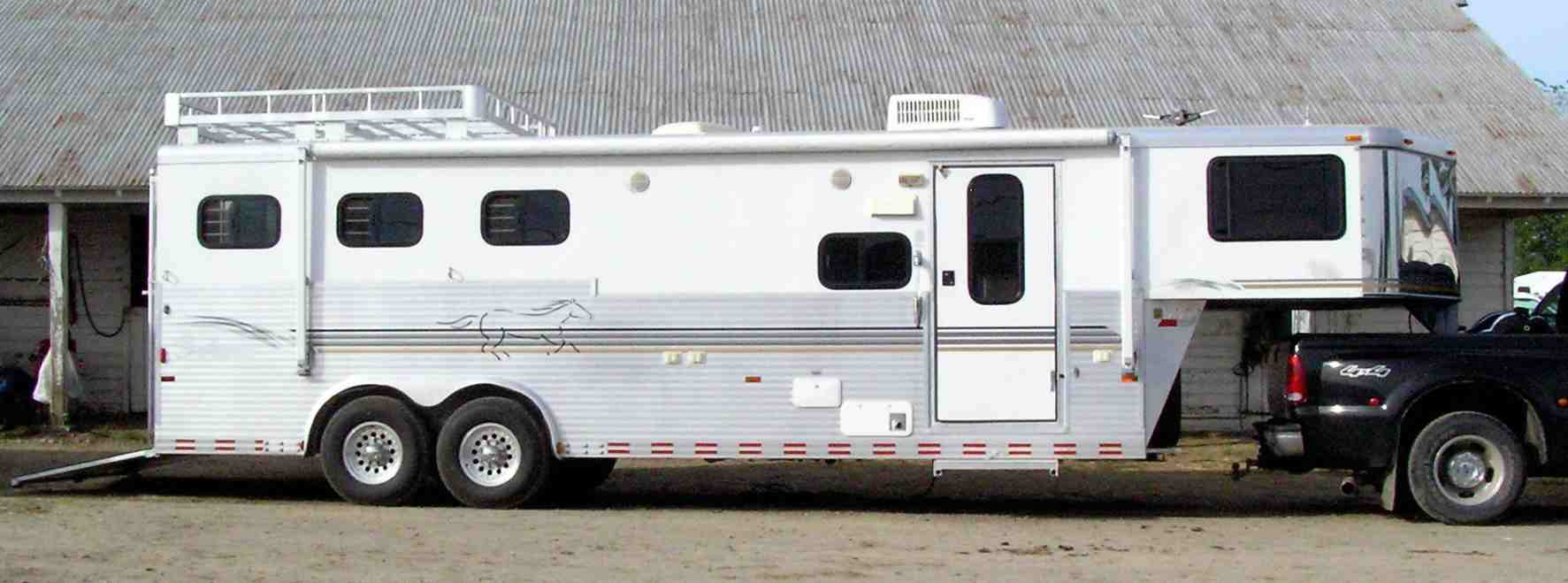
A "gooseneck" style horse trailer that also has living quarters in the front for people to use. It is attached to the bed of a pickup truck with a trailer ball coupling.

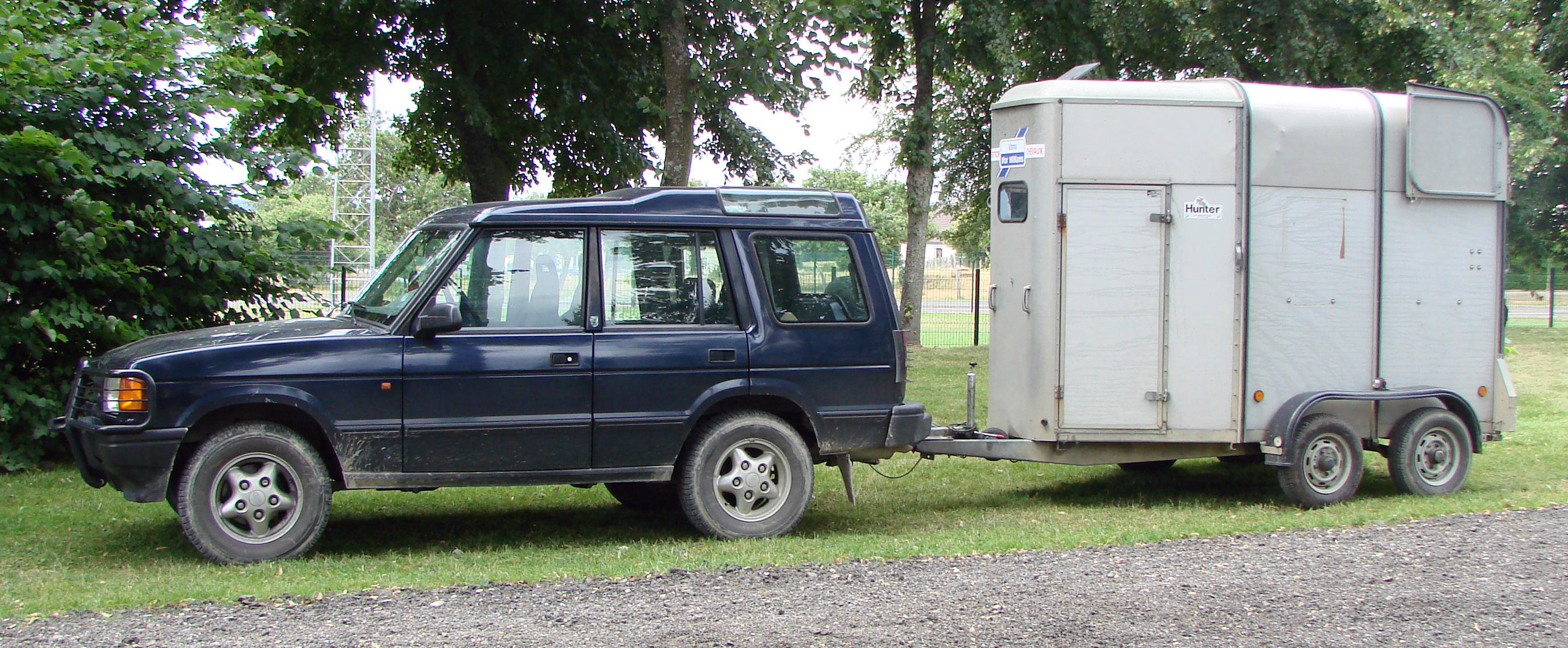
A European-style horse box, light enough to be pulled by a smaller vehicle

== History ==
Highly valued race horses were originally transported by specially outfitted railroad cars, but this transport was difficult to use due to issues of scheduling and delays. In December 1918, Popular Science Monthly reported on a new concept for transporting racehorses in specially modified "Motor-Trucks" that eliminated these transport delays.

In World War 1, horses were used with infantry in France, and many were injured in the course of the war. If these animals could be transported back to animal hospitals, many could be saved. For this purpose, a special horse ambulance vehicle was developed which could be rotated so that horses could walk forward both onto and off of the ambulance truck.

== Motorised horse boxes ==
Horseboxes (motorised) can vary in size, depending on the number and size of horses to be carried. In Europe, horseboxes are developed from vehicles ranging from 3.5 tonnes (3.44 long tons; 3.86 short tons) gross vehicle weight, through to legal maximums of over 40 tonnes (39.4 long tons; 44.1 short tons) . In some geographies - such as the United Kingdom - a vehicle's legal tonnage may be restricted so that it's accessible to drivers without advanced licenses.

Some horse boxes contain human living accommodation - including beds, electricity, and running water. This is useful, as competitions may involve staying at a venue for one or more nights.

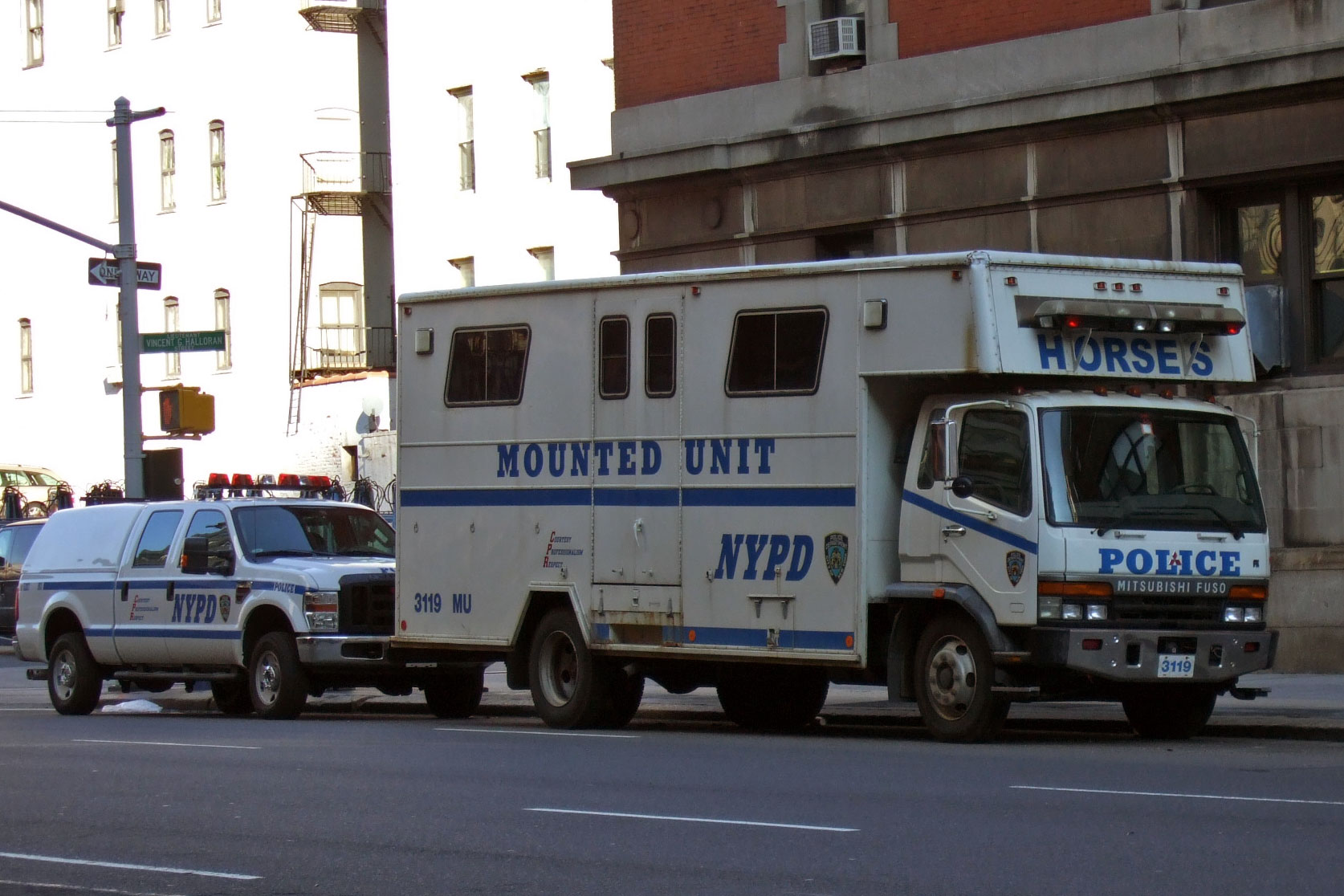
NYPD Mounted unit horsebox

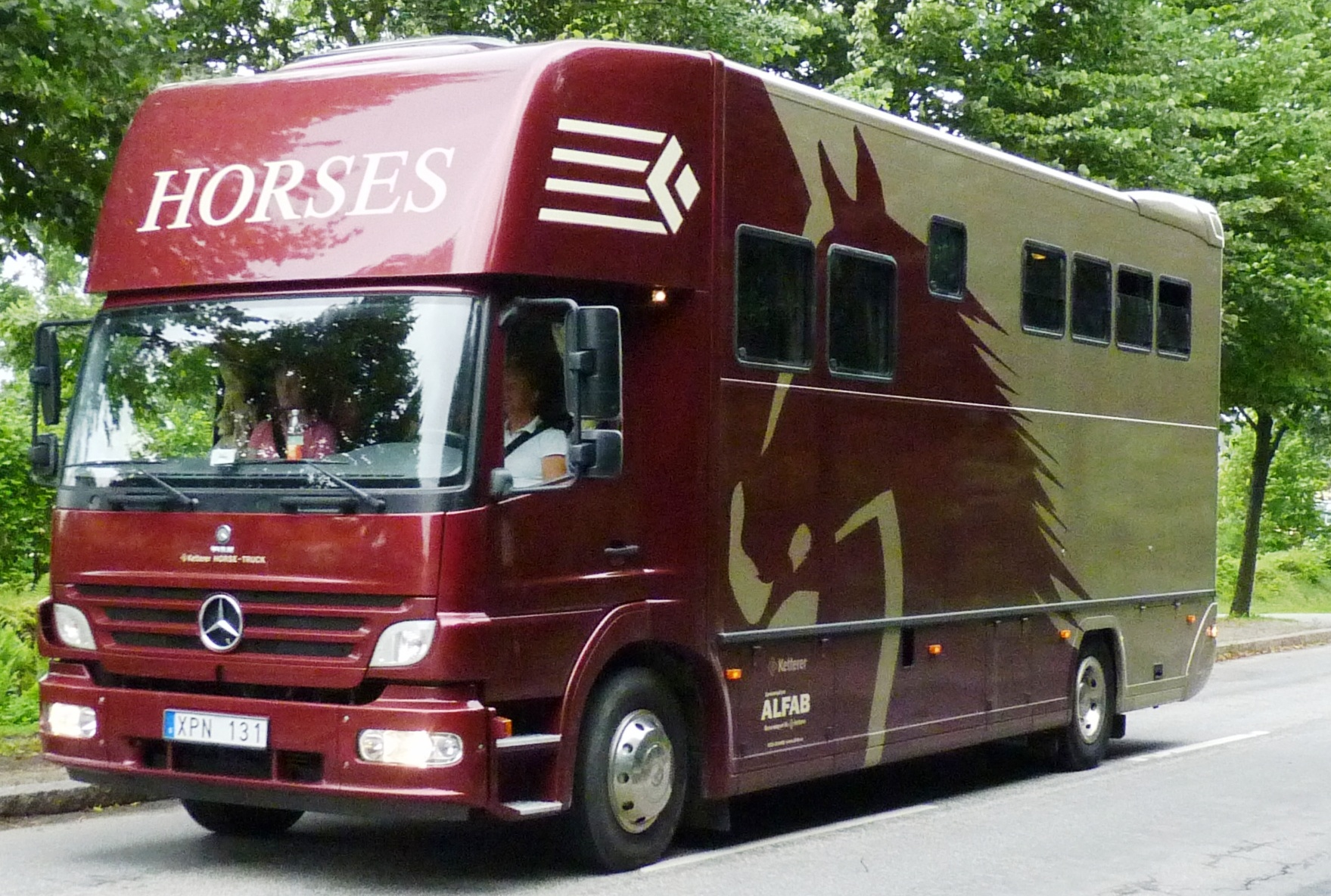
Horsebox built by Ketterer Horse Trucks (Germany) on a Mercedes Benz chassis

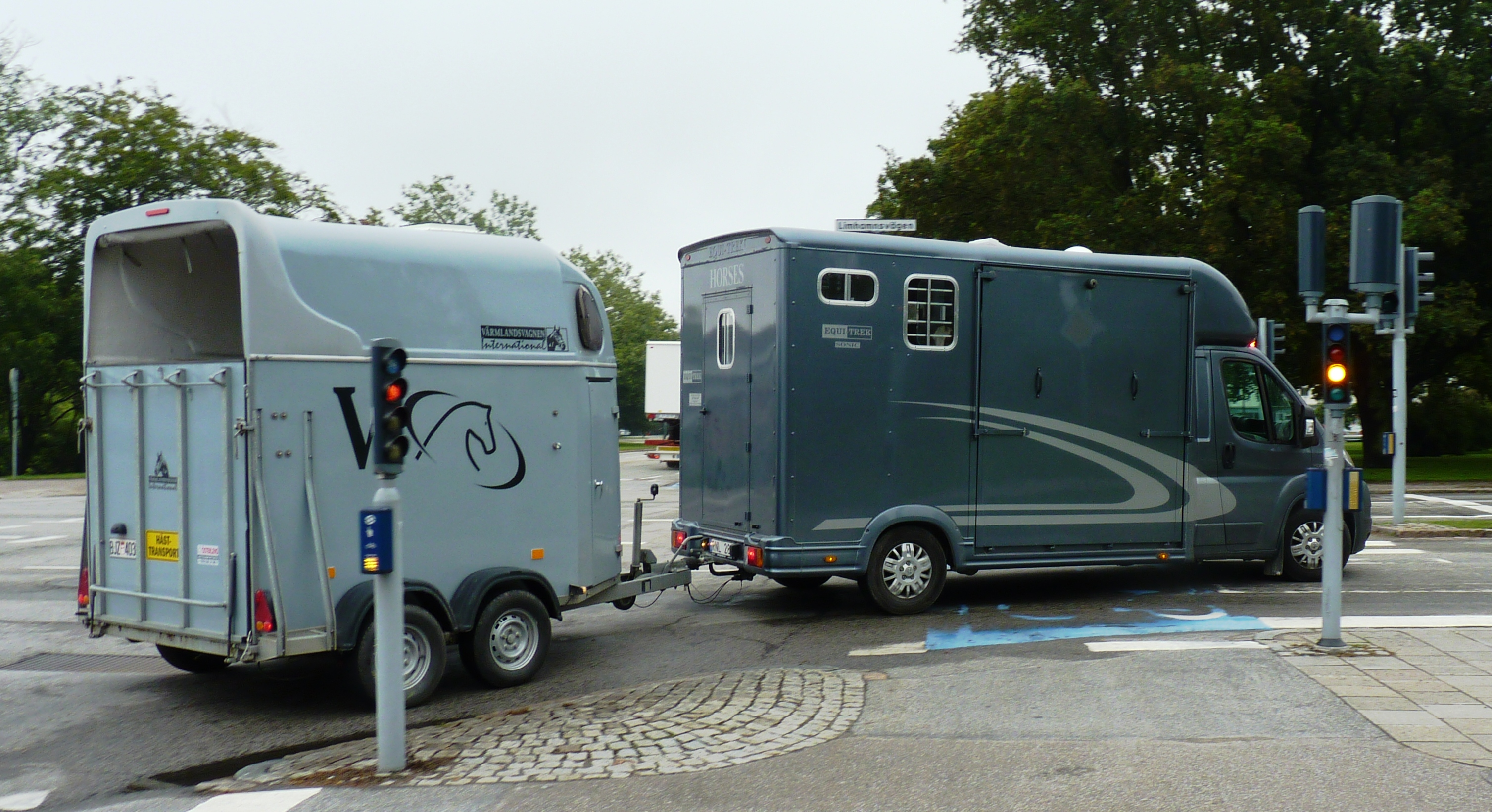
A 3.5-tonne horsebox pulling a horse trailer in Sweden

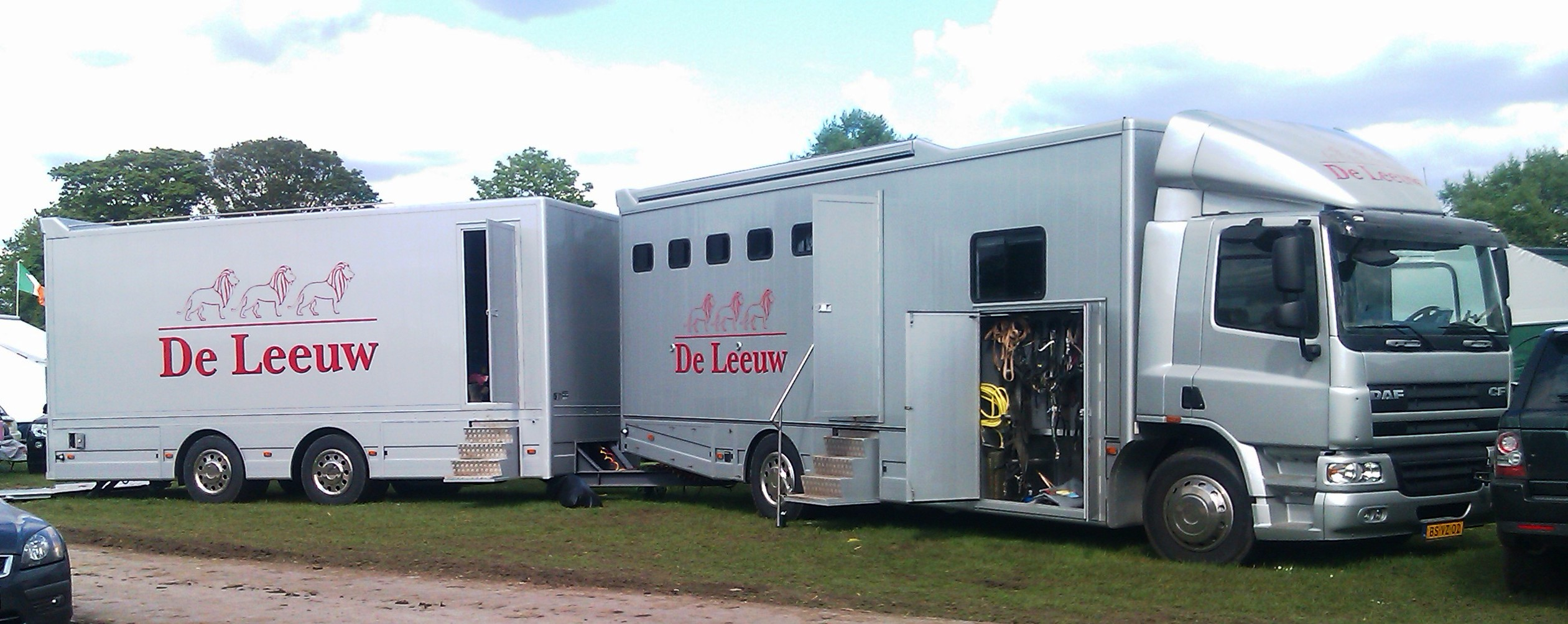
A large DAF horsebox towing a trailer for carriages. Taken at the Royal Windsor Horse Show, 2011.

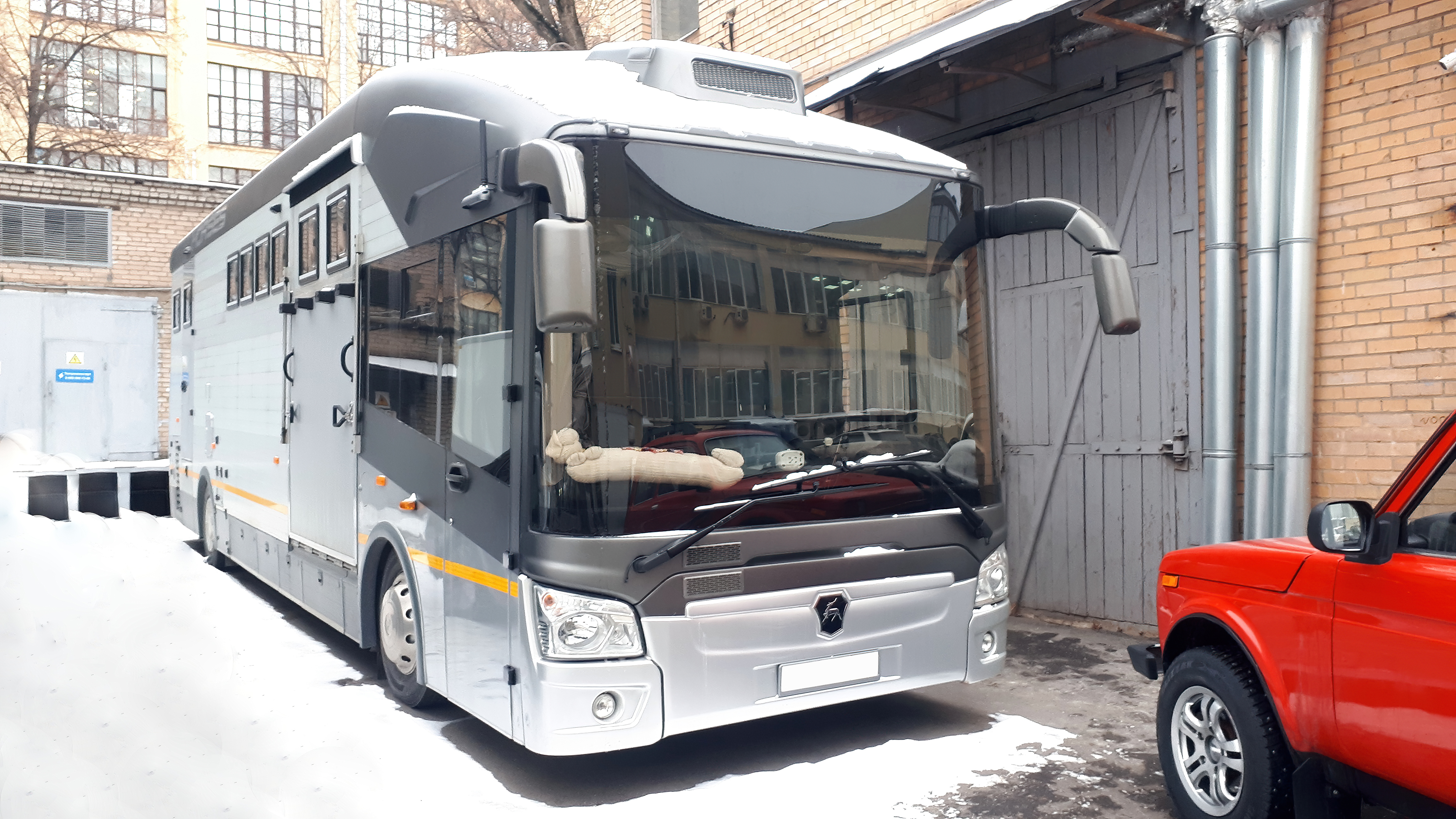
LiAZ (Russia) bus based horse carrier in Russia

== Layout and features ==
=== Access ===
In Europe, most motorised horseboxes will feature a single main ramp on the rear or to the side, though those with rear ramps may have a second smaller side ramp. Within the European Union, regulations dictate that a horsebox ramp (used for commercial transportation of horses) should be no steeper than 20°. It is also a requirement that the driver or other attendant be able to access the horse area without using the ramp. This is often achieved through fitting a small hatch or doorway (called a groom's door in the UK).

Many smaller horse trailers, particularly towing and gooseneck models that hold two to four horses, do not feature ramps, either by having a low height floor or a demountable structure.

=== Horse stall dimensions and orientation ===
Horses can be transported facing the direction of travel (forward-facing), facing the opposite way of travel (rear-facing) or on the diagonal (herringbone). It is also said that horses need sufficient room to take one step in either direction, so as to better support their weight when the vehicle is in motion.

Many American horse trailers have stalls which are slanted at about a 45-degree angle to the line of travel, this design is thought to be more natural to horses, as many times horses travel slightly canted to the line of travel when hauled in a stock trailer without dividers. It also has the benefit of being able to haul more horses in a shorter unit.

Some scientific research has been done to establish in which position the horse is most comfortable. The bulk of research suggests that horse have reduced stress and fatigue when travelling backwards. Travelling forwards also has reduced stress compared with travelling sideways

Sufficient headroom for horses must be provided, at least 75 cm (29.5 in) above the height of withers.

== Railway horse boxes ==
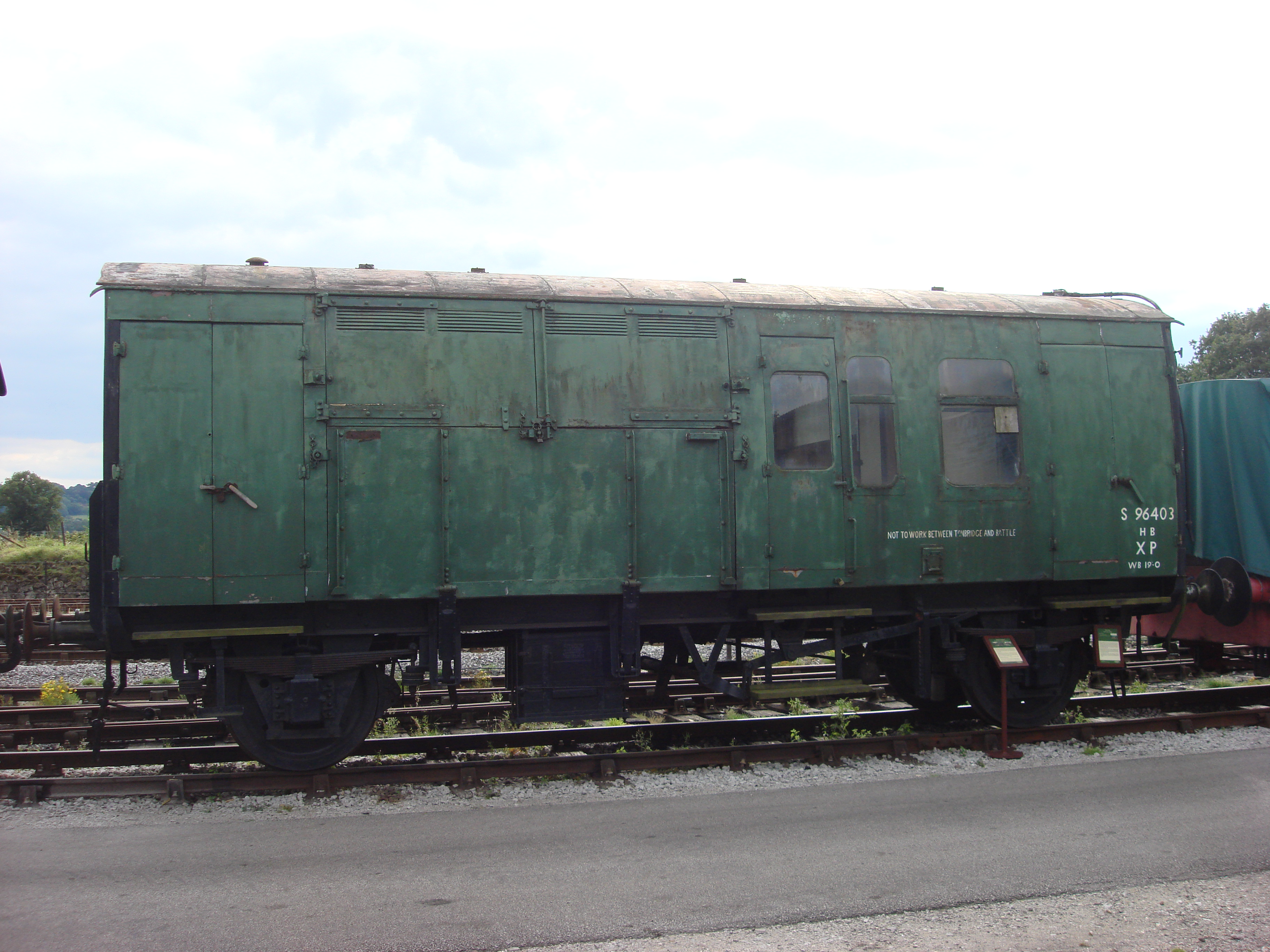
Former British Railways horse box no. S96403, built 1958; the door with a window opens into the grooms' compartment. Buckinghamshire Railway Centre, 2008

Horses were carried on the railways of the United Kingdom until 1972, using rolling stock known as horse boxes. These were often used to carry racehorses between the parts of the country where the breeders and trainers were based, and the racecourses. Some railway-owned horse boxes were hired on a semi-permanent basis to racehorse trainers (such as Frank Butters) or owners (such as the Earl of Derby). They were conveyed either in small numbers attached to ordinary passenger trains, or special trains consisting of several horse boxes coupled together.

A typical British Railways horse box of the late 1950s had a body length of 27 feet 6 inches (8.38 m) and a width of 8 feet 6 inches (2.59 m). In that space there was a section for three horses standing abreast, with padded dividers to prevent the horses from falling sideways; to the rear of the horses was a compartment for the storage of straw bales; in front of the horses was a grooms' compartment with windows and coach bench-type seating; hatches in the partition between the horse compartment and the grooms' compartment allowed the grooms to feed and watch over the horses. Beyond the grooms' compartment, a passageway along one side led to a toilet, and also to a fodder compartment at the end of the vehicle. Each compartment, except the toilet, had external doors; the lower part of each horse compartment door was hinged horizontally, to form an access ramp. There were six windows: four in the grooms' compartment (two of these being droplights in the doors), one in the passageway and a frosted glass window in the toilet.

== See also ==
- Equestrianism
- Horse car
- Trailer (vehicle)
