= Fairfield, New York =

Town in Herkimer County, New York, USA

- Town
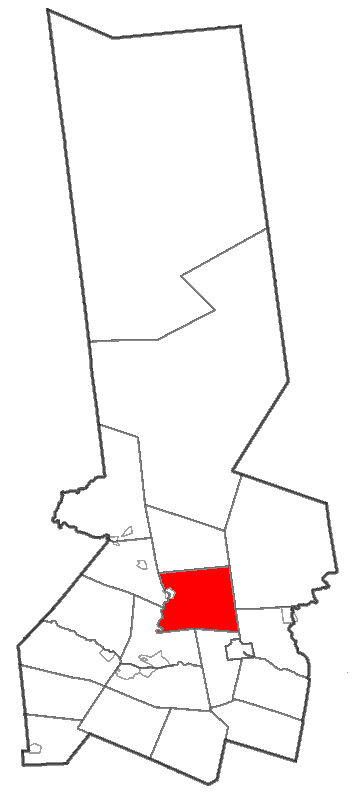
- Herkimer County map with the Town of Fairfield in red

- Location within New York Location within the United States
- Coordinates: 43°7′29″N 74°56′4″W
- Country: United States
- State: New York
- County: Herkimer

Government
  - Type: Town Council
  - Town Supervisor: Henry A. Crofoot(R)
  - Town Council: Members' list: • Robert A. Price (R); • Dennis J. Maxwell (R); • Nancy L. Romer(R); • Richard K. Lindsay Sr.(R)

Area
  - Total: 41.46 sq mi (107.37 km^{2})
  - Land: 41.30 sq mi (106.96 km^{2})
  - Water: 0.16 sq mi (0.42 km^{2})
- Elevation: 1,060 ft (323 m)

Population (2020)
  - Total: 1,475
  - Density: 35.7/sq mi (13.79/km^{2})
- Time zone: UTC-5 (Eastern (EST))
  - Summer (DST): UTC-4 (EDT)
- ZIP Codes: 13406 (Middleville); 13365 (Little Falls); 13416 (Newport)
- Area code: 315
- FIPS code: 36-043-24933
- GNIS feature ID: 0978950

Fairfield is a town in Herkimer County, New York, United States. The population was 1,475 at the 2020 census, down from 1,627 at the 2010 census. The town is named after Fairfield, Connecticut.

The town is north of the village of Herkimer and east of Utica. The hamlet of Fairfield is in the central part of the town.

== History ==
A few settlers, actually tenants, made the future town their home before the American Revolution, but the major influx took place after 1785, mainly from New England.

The town was established from part of the town of Norway in 1796.

From 1802 to 1901, the Fairfield Academy offered secondary and higher education at its campus in the hamlet of Fairfield. From 1812 until 1841, the Fairfield Medical College, a division of the academy, trained medical practitioners, including Marcus Whitman.

== Geography ==
According to the United States Census Bureau, the town has a total area of 41.5 square miles (107.4 km^{2}), of which 41.3 square miles (107.0 km^{2}) are land and 0.2 square miles (0.4 km^{2}), or 0.39%, are water.

The western town line is marked by West Canada Creek. Fairfield is north of the Mohawk River, but does not border it.

New York State Route 29, an east–west highway, crosses Fairfield. New York State Route 169 is a north–south highway in the western part of the town. New York State Route 170 is another north–south highway, but in the eastern part of Fairfield. New York State Route 170A is at the eastern town line.

== Demographics ==
Historical population
Census	Pop.	Note	%±
1820	2,610		—
1830	2,265		−13.2%
1840	1,836		−18.9%
1850	1,646		−10.3%
1860	1,712		4.0%
1870	1,653		−3.4%
1880	1,656		0.2%
1890	1,553		−6.2%
1900	1,390		−10.5%
1910	1,305		−6.1%
1920	1,337		2.5%
1930	1,248		−6.7%
1940	1,095		−12.3%
1950	1,204		10.0%
1960	1,282		6.5%
1970	1,446		12.8%
1980	1,455		0.6%
1990	1,442		−0.9%
2000	1,607		11.4%
2010	1,627		1.2%
2020	1,475		−9.3%
U.S. Decennial Census

As of the census of 2000, there were 1,607 people, 561 households, and 430 families residing in the town. The population density was 39.1 inhabitants per square mile (15.1/km^{2}). There were 611 housing units at an average density of 14.9 per square mile (5.8/km^{2}). The racial makeup of the town was 98.44% White, 0.37% African American, 0.19% Native American, and 1.00% from two or more races. Hispanic or Latino people of any race were 0.25% of the population.

There were 561 households, out of which 35.8% had children under the age of 18 living with them, 64.2% were married couples living together, 7.8% had a female householder with no husband present, and 23.2% were non-families. 19.1% of all households were made up of individuals, and 7.7% had someone living alone who was 65 years of age or older. The average household size was 2.78 and the average family size was 3.17.

In the town, the population was spread out, with 26.3% under the age of 18, 7.0% from 18 to 24, 27.1% from 25 to 44, 25.8% from 45 to 64, and 13.8% who were 65 years of age or older. The median age was 38 years. For every 100 females, there were 103.2 males. For every 100 females age 18 and over, there were 96.0 males.

The median income for a household in the town was $40,104, and the median income for a family was $45,069. Males had a median income of $31,992 versus $21,944 for females. The per capita income for the town was $15,603. About 9.0% of families and 11.6% of the population were below the poverty line, including 13.7% of those under age 18 and 13.0% of those age 65 or over.

== Communities and locations in Fairfield ==
- Barto Hill – an elevation located east of Fairfield
- Countryman – a location near the western town line, southwest of Fairfield village
- Dillenbeck Corners – a location in the southeastern part of the town on County Road 70
- Eatonville – a hamlet at the southern town line on NY-169
- Fairfield – The hamlet of Fairfield is near the center of the town on NY-29 at the junction of County Roads 103 and 142. The Trinity Episcopal Church-Fairfield was added to the National Register of Historic Places in 1993.
- Goodell Corners – A location in the southeastern part of the town near the town line, located on NY-170 at NY-170A.
- Middleville – Part of the village of Middleville is within the western town line at the intersection of NY-29 and NY-169.
- Old City – a hamlet at the northwestern corner of the town on County Road 7
- Top Notch – An elevation located south of Goodell Corners. Partially in the Town of Little Falls.
- Welch Corners – A location in the northwestern corner of the town, south of Old City and located on NY-29. The Old City Road Stone Arch Bridge was added to the National Register of Historic Places in 2001.

== Notable people ==
- George Kretsinger (1835–1901), Medal of Honor recipient in the American Civil War
- Richard P. Marvin (1803–1892), former US congressman
- Alonzo C. Mather (1848–1941), founder and president of Mather Stock Car Company
- Polly Anne Reed (1818–1881), Shaker artist
- Richard Sherwood Satterlee (1796-1880), brigadier general in the Union Army (1822 - 1869)
- Robert W. Waterman (1826-1891), 17th governor of California (1887-1891)
- Lyman Wight (1796–1858), early leader in Latter Day Saint movement
- Mary Bannister Willard (1841–1912), editor, temperance worker, and educator

== In popular culture ==
In Indiana Jones and the Last Crusade, Barnett College, the fictional college where Indiana Jones teaches archaeology, is revealed to be located in Fairfield.
