= Harrison Arms =

American businessman (1839–1917)

- Born: Harrison H. Arms; August 3, 1839; Adams, Jefferson County, New York, U.S.
- Died: July 5, 1917 (aged 77) near Marshall, Michigan, U.S.
- Resting place: Toledo, Ohio, U.S.
- Occupation: Businessman
- Spouse: Lucy R.

Harrison H. Arms (August 3, 1839 – July 5, 1917) was a Toledo, Ohio livery and stable operator who, in 1885, formed the Arms Palace Horse Car Company for the purpose of transporting racehorses and other high-value animals by rail in a specialized type of "horse car" of his own design.

== Early life ==
Harrison H. Arms was born on August 3, 1839, in Adams, Jefferson County, New York.

== Career ==
Arms was the founder of the Arms Palace Horse Car Company. He had offices in Chicago and had a stock farm in Marshall, Michigan.

Arms was a stockholder and director of the Monrovia First National Bank and the Southern Counties Gas Company. He also built the first cheese factory in New York.

== Personal life ==
Arms married Lucy R. He moved to Monrovia, California, around 1907 and built a home at 215 Highland Avenue.

Arms died on July 5, 1917, at his country estate near Marshall, Michigan. He was cremated and interred in Toledo, Ohio.
