= Barto Hill =

Mountain in New York, United States

- Location within New York Location within the United States

Highest point
- Elevation: 1,647 feet (502 m)
- Coordinates: 43°07′50″N 74°53′23″W

Geography
- Location: E of Fairfield, New York, U.S.
- Topo map: USGS Middleville

Barto Hill is a summit located in Central New York Region of New York located in the Town of Fairfield in Herkimer County, east of Fairfield. Sugarloaf is located northeast of Barto Hill.
