= Mather Tower =

Skyscraper in Chicago, Illinois

Coordinates: 41.8877°N 87.6254°W

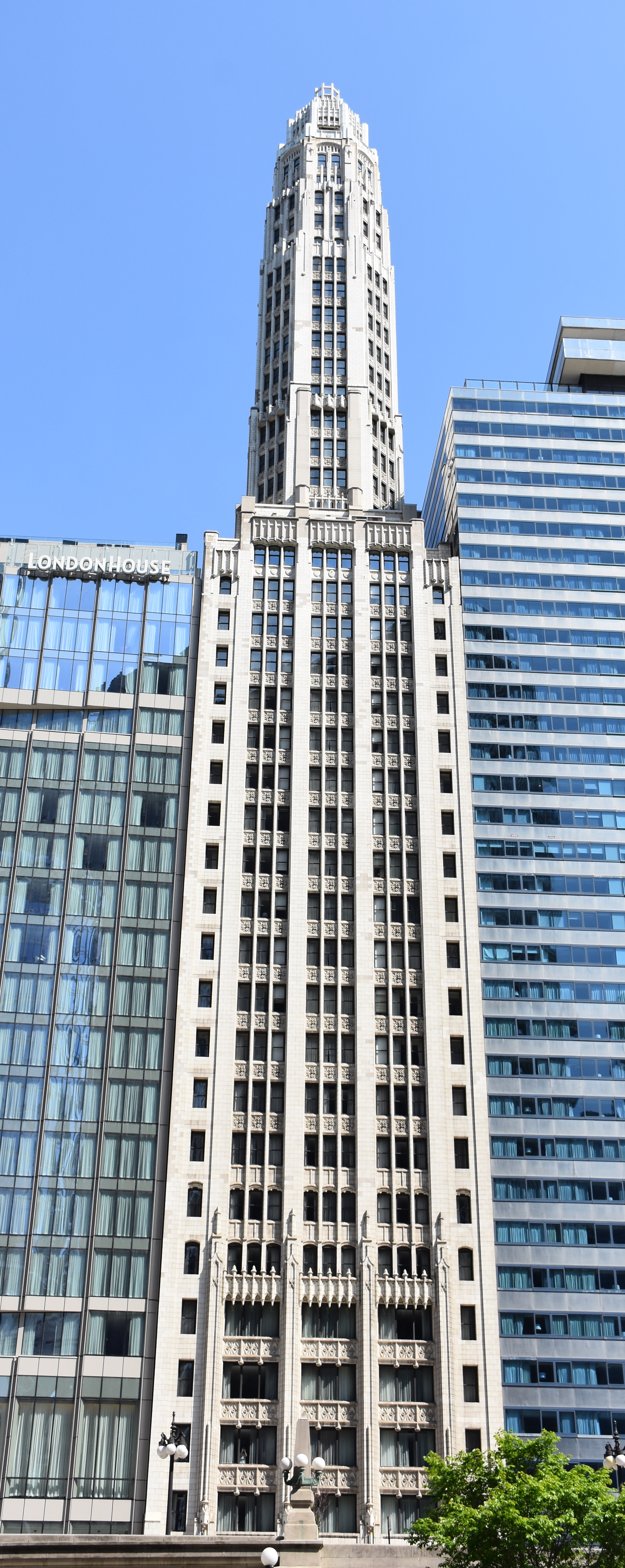
Mather Tower in 2016

Mather Tower (later Lincoln Tower, as designated on the Michigan–Wacker Historic District roster; now identified primarily by its address) is a Neo-Gothic, terra cotta-clad high-rise structure in Chicago, Illinois, United States. It is located at 75 East Wacker Drive in the downtown "loop" area, adjacent to the Chicago River.

The 521-foot (159 m)-high building is sometimes called "The Inverted Spyglass" by Chicagoans due to its highly unusual design, an 18-story octagonal tower atop a more conventional 24-story rectangular "box." Briefly the tallest building in Chicago at the time of its completion in 1928, it remains the city's most slender high-rise structure at only 100 by 65 feet (30 by 20 m) at its base. Its needle-like form was encouraged by the 1923 Chicago Zoning Ordinance, which called for "setback" buildings. The interior space within the upper octagonal spire contains the least square footage per floor of any Chicago skyscraper.

== History ==
It was designed by Herbert Hugh Riddle (1875–1939), the architect of the Chicago Theological Seminary, as headquarters for the Mather Stock Car Company, a builder of rail cars for transporting livestock. Its design was greatly influenced by the pioneering Chicago Zoning Ordinance of 1923, which placed no limit on the height of new buildings as long as the surface area of the structure's uppermost floor did not exceed 25% of its footprint. This resulted in a multitude of tall, slender, "setback" towers, of which the Mather is an extreme and unusual example. The top floor of the octagonal spire has only 280 square feet (26 m^{2}) of floor space.

The general contractors were W.A. Illsey. The masonry work was done by R.F. Wilson and Company. the steel framing was erected by Overland Construction Company. Northwestern Terra-Cotta executed the cream colored terra cotta ornament.

Mather Company's founder, Alonzo Mather (a descendant of Cotton Mather) is said to be responsible for a number of the building's distinctive design features, including the octagonal tower. Initial plans called for construction of a second, identical building on North Michigan Avenue, behind the Mather and connected to it by a ground-floor arcade, but onset of the Great Depression in 1929 forced its cancellation.

By the 1990s the building had fallen into significant disrepair. In 2000 the 4-story "cupola" at the top of the building was demolished because of structural deterioration and safety concerns, after chunks of terra cotta began falling from the facade. Damage was sufficiently extensive that consideration was given to dismantling the remaining 17 stories of the octagonal spire as well.

In 2000 Masterworks Development Corporation purchased the structure and undertook a complete restoration. In November 2002, the final phase of the project was initiated when a helicopter lifted the steel framework for a new cupola from a river barge to the top of the tower.

The lower, rectangular portion of the building currently houses the River Hotel, while the octagonal upper stories are occupied by a branch of the Club Quarters chain of membership corporate accommodations.

Mather Tower was designated a Chicago Historic Landmark in 2001, and in 2006 it received a National Preservation Honor Award from the National Trust for Historic Preservation.

== Architecture and structure ==
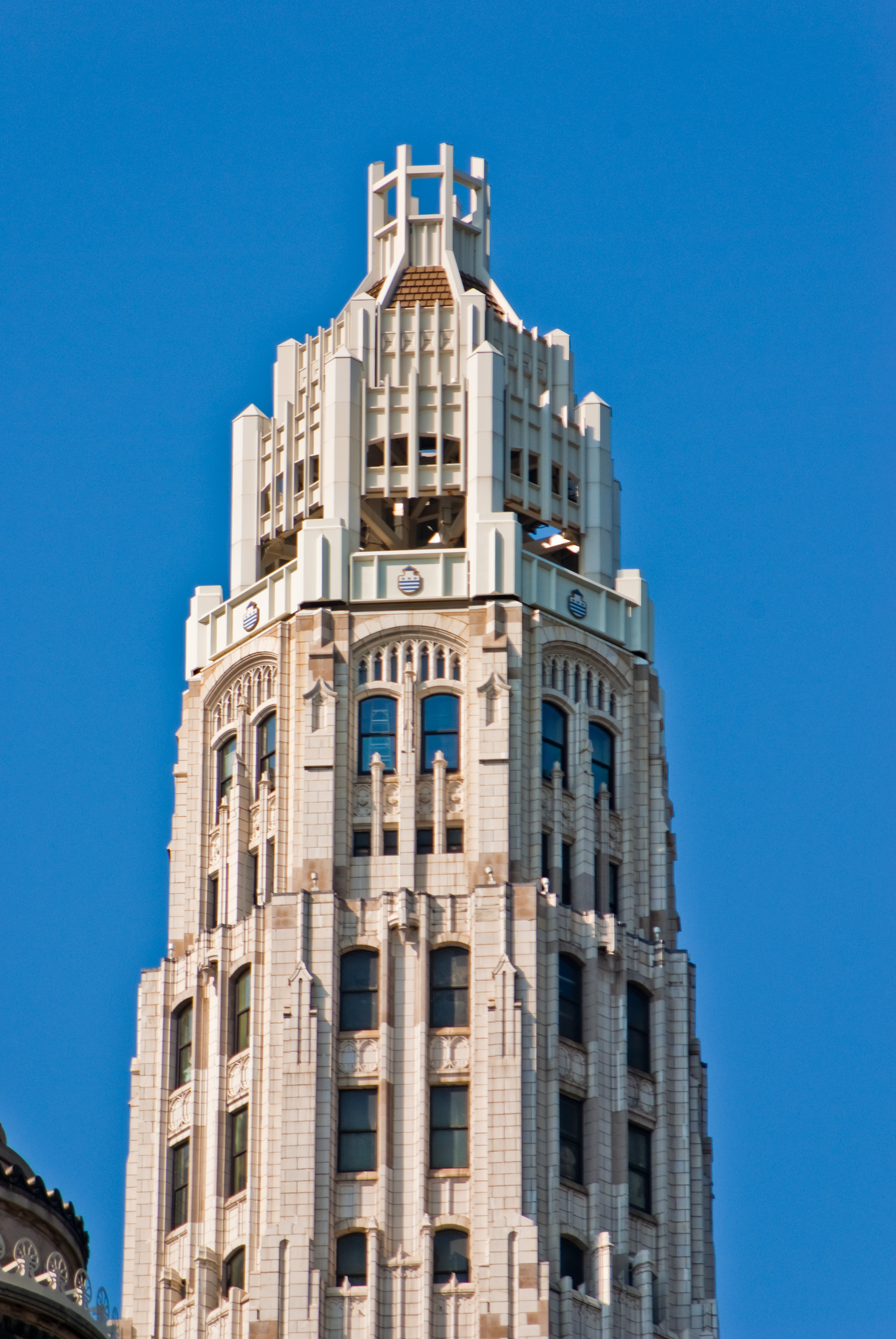
This new kind of octagonal upper half of the tower defines the Neo-Gothic properties popular in the revival period of Architecture.

The Neo-Gothic, otherwise referred to as the Gothic Revival, Style used in the design was part of the result of the search for a style of American architecture at the time. The style had heavy influence on American architecture after its birth in England during the mid-18th century. Neo-Gothic is a founding style seen in other late 19th century and early 20th century buildings in Chicago, and was a long-lasting style around America of the time in general.

The Mather Tower was clad in a terra cotta, which was a façade gaining in popularity at the time. Terra cotta itself was widely used for pottery dating back to antiquity. The cladding is a strong, weather-resistant material. Given that terra cotta cladding is simply hardened clay, it is a natural product and avoids the use of chemicals. Fast-growing city of Chicago, like other cities in the early 20th century, was densely populated. Terra cotta is also known for its ability to absorb sound waves, giving it more desirable properties addressing the sound pollution in cities during building design. As more buildings grew taller, the move from heavy, masonry walls to lightweight structure was inevitable, and terra cotta cladding arose as a lightweight solution.

Contrary to what it may seem, the deterioration of the Mather Tower, prior to its restoration in the early 2000s, did not originate in the falling terra cotta cladding itself. Although the material is durable and long lasting, it was still a relatively new kind of cladding (especially for skyscrapers) and came with some unpredicted design properties. Thermocycling along with a combination of compressive forces were not necessarily accounted for in the early 20th century design phase. These are properties that are now known to cause deterioration in facades like terra cotta. In previous designs, the mass of the masonry in walls would absorb moisture, and therefore these new ideas on thermal cycling were not needed. With more structures evolving from masonry to steel, methods previously depended on were no longer sufficient. When considering the need for the restoration of the Mather Tower, it is likely, although not specifically stated, that the falling cladding was a result of cracking terra cotta due to high amounts of strain from the structure itself.
