= Old City Road Stone Arch Bridge =

- U.S. National Register of Historic Places
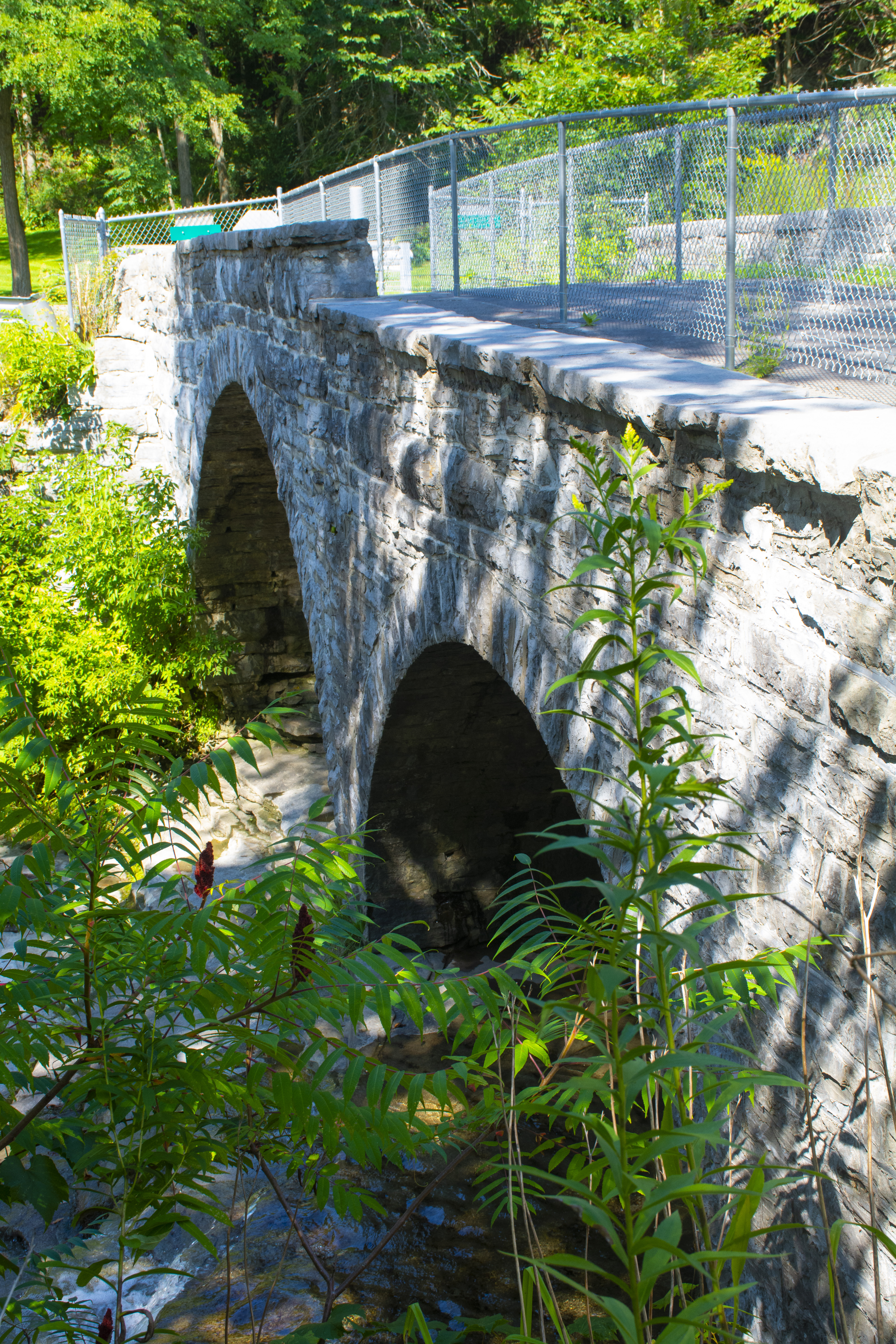

- Location within New York Location within the United States
- Nearest city: Welch Corners, New York
- Coordinates: 43°9′51″N 74°59′8″W
- Area: less than one acre
- Built: 1898
- Architect: Todd, Charles & Eugene
- NRHP reference No.: 01001398
- Added to NRHP: December 28, 2001

Old City Road Stone Arch Bridge is a historic stone arch bridge located near Welch Corners in Herkimer County, New York. It was constructed in 1898 and spans City Brook, a tributary of West Canada Creek. It is 64 feet long and has a double arch with spans of 28 feet and rise of 12 feet.

It was listed on the National Register of Historic Places in 2001.
