= Richard Sherwood Satterlee =

Union army general (1798–1880)

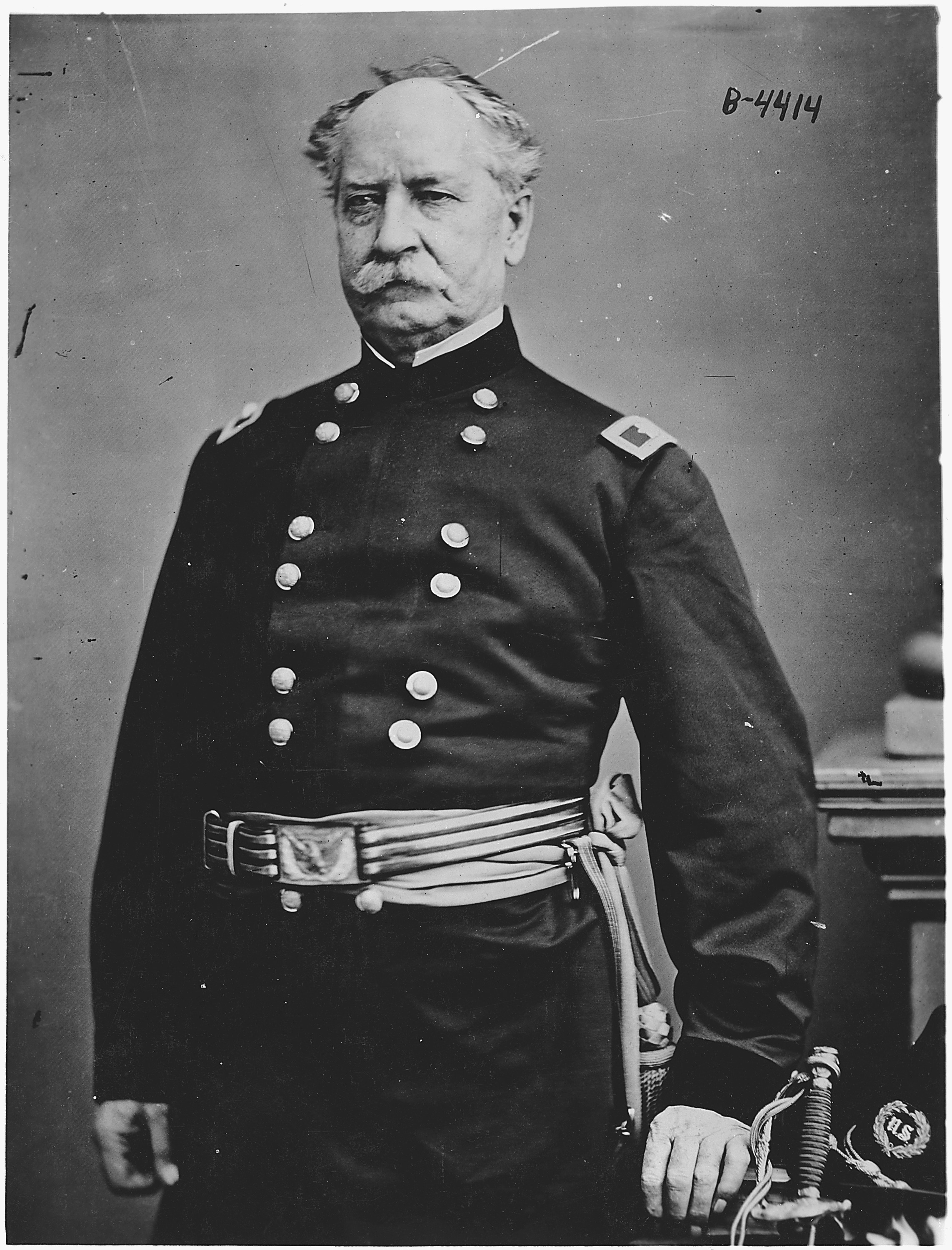
- Born: Richard Sherwood Satterlee; December 6, 1798; Fairfield, New York, United States
- Died: November 10, 1880 (aged 83); New York City, United States
- Relatives: William Satterlee
- Military career
- Allegiance: United States of America
- Branch: United States Army; Union Army
- Service years: 1822–1869
- Rank: Lieutenant Colonel; Bvt. Brigadier General
- Conflicts: Black Hawk War; Mexican–American War: Battle of Molino del Rey; Battle of Chapultepec; American Civil War

Richard Sherwood Satterlee (1798–1880) was a medical officer in the United States Army.

== Biography ==
Satterlee was born on December 6, 1798, in Fairfield, New York. His father, Major. William Satterlee, had served in the American Revolutionary War. Sattlerlee obtained his medical license in 1818 and began practicing in rural Seneca County, New York. He moved to Detroit, then part of the Michigan Territory, in 1822. There he married Mary S. Hunt, sister of John Hunt, a Michigan Territorial Supreme Court Justice. Satterlee died on November 10, 1880, in New York City.

== Career ==
Satterlee joined the Army in February 1822 at the Detroit Barracks as assistant surgeon. He was subsequently stationed at Fort Niagara in Porter, New York, Fort Howard in Green Bay, Wisconsin, and Fort Mackinac on Mackinac Island, Michigan. In 1831 he transferred to Fort Winnebago in Portage, Wisconsin. While there he would take part in the Black Hawk War.

Following a second tour of duty at Fort Howard, Satterlee was sent to Florida to assist in a campaign against the Seminole. During his time there, he was given an official commendation by his commanding officer, future U.S. President Zachary Taylor.

After a tour of duty at Fort Adams in Newport, Rhode Island, Satterlee was sent to serve in the Mexican–American War. Serving under Winfield Scott, Satterlee took part in the Battle of Molino del Rey and the Battle of Chapultepec. Following his service in the war, he returned to Fort Adams in 1848. In 1853 he survived the sinking of the steamboat San Francisco off the coast from New York as it was carrying an artillery regiment to the West Coast.

He served throughout most of the American Civil War as head of the Union Army's Medical Purveyor's Office in New York City. While there, he oversaw the introduction of the Satterlee bone saw, used for amputations, which had a "pistol grip." This saw is still in use. During the war he was brevetted a Brigadier General and was a candidate for the command of the Medical Corps following the dismissal of Clement Finley. The command eventually went to William Alexander Hammond. Satterlee retired in 1869.
