= Top Notch (New York) =

Mountain in New York, United States

- Location within New York Location within the United States

Highest point
- Elevation: 1,250 feet (380 m)
- Coordinates: 43°04′39″N 74°51′44″W

Geography
- Location: SE of Fairfield, New York, U.S.
- Topo map: USGS Little Falls

Top Notch is a summit located in Central New York Region of New York located in the Town of Fairfield in Herkimer County, southeast of Fairfield.
