= Trinity Episcopal Church-Fairfield =

Historic church in New York, United States

- Trinity Episcopal Church--Fairfield
- U.S. National Register of Historic Places
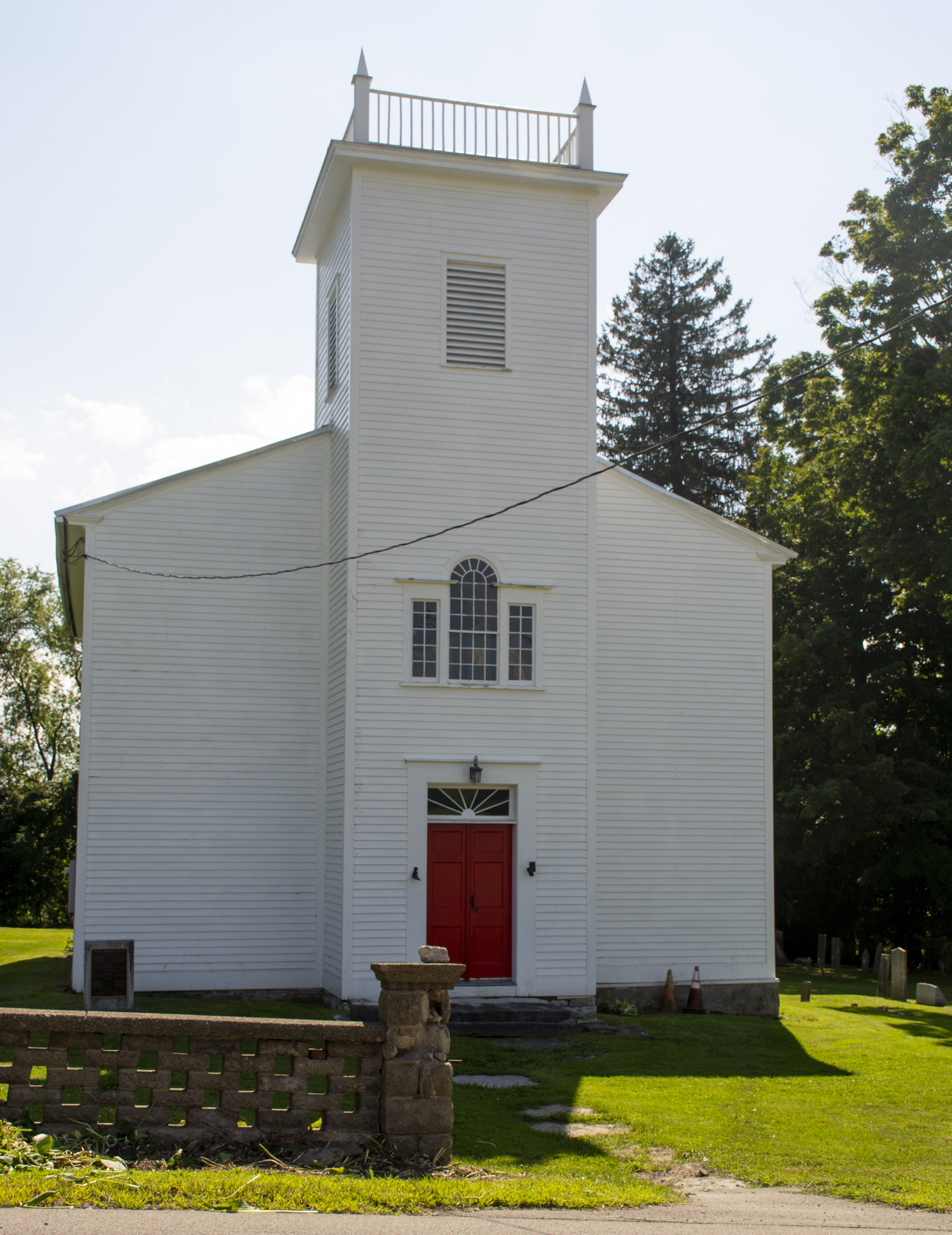

- Location within New York Location within the United States
- Location: NY 29 (Salisbury St.), hamlet of Fairfield, New York
- Coordinates: 43°8′9″N 74°54′41″W
- Area: 1.1 acres (0.45 ha)
- Built: 1808
- Architect: George Buell
- Architectural style: Federal
- NRHP reference No.: 93000499
- Added to NRHP: June 10, 1993

Trinity Episcopal Church—Fairfield is a historic Episcopal church located on NY 29 (Salisbury St.) in the hamlet of Fairfield, Herkimer County, New York. It was built in 1808, and is a 2 1/2-story, three bay by four bay, wood-frame church with a gable roof. It features a projecting three-story, flat topped square bell tower, centered on the front facade. The church houses an 1845 George Jardine pipe organ that can still be hand pumped. The bell from the Fairfield Academy was installed in the bell tower in 1962. It is considered the mother church to subsequent Episcopal congregations in Herkimer County.

It was added to the National Register of Historic Places in 1993.
