= Lake Huron and Southwestern Railway =

Railway company in Michigan

Overview
- Locale: Northern Michigan
- Dates of operation: 1878–1880
- Successor: Tawas and Bay County Railroad

Technical
- Track gauge: 3 ft 2 in (965 mm)
- Track length: 21 miles (34 km)

The Lake Huron and Southwestern Railway was a railway company that operated in the state of Michigan in the late 1870s. It was incorporated in 1878 to build a line from Tawas City, Michigan, to lumber camps in Ogemaw County, and completed that 21-mile (34 km) line the same year. The company failed financially the following year and was sold to the Tawas and Bay County Railroad. The line eventually became part of the Detroit and Mackinac Railway and part of it remains active today.

== History ==
The Lake Huron and Southwestern Railway was incorporated on April 15, 1878. The major figures behind the company were Charles D. Hale and Sylvester Hale, based out of Tawas City, Michigan. The railroad's primary purpose was logging, and it was built to a 3 ft 2 in (965 mm) gauge. The line was opened from Tawas City to what is now Prescott that same year.

Charles D. Hale stepped down as company president in February 1879. Charles H. Prescott, an investor in the company, purchased it from the original owners on October 1, 1879. Prescott formed the Tawas and Bay County Railroad, which acquired the Lake Huron and Southwestern Railway on February 12, 1880.
