= Alonzo C. Mather =

American business executive (1848–1941)

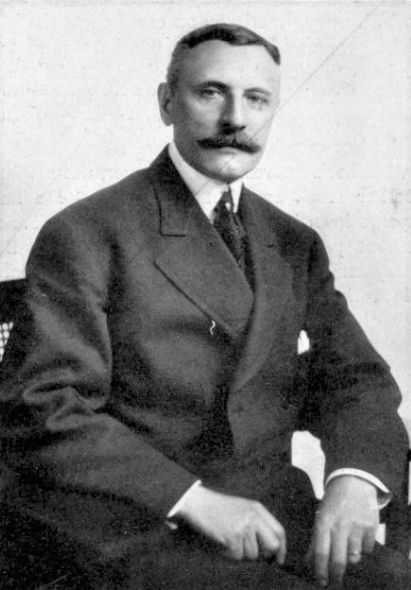
- Mather in a 1905 publication
- Born: Alonzo Clark Mather; April 12, 1848; Fairfield, New York
- Died: January 25, 1941 (aged 92); Los Angeles, California
- Known for: Founder of Mather Stock Car Company
- Spouses: Martha C. Johnson; Louise Eames

Alonzo Clark Mather (April 12, 1848 – January 25, 1941) was founder and president of the Mather Stock Car Company, a U.S. firm that built and leased railroad freight cars, especially stock cars.

== Birth and education ==
Alonzo Mather was born in Fairfield, New York, in 1848; the second son of Dr. William Mather and Mary Ann (Buell) Mather. His father was a noted professor who traveled extensively, leaving his mother to raise him and his siblings. However, although Dr. Mather was away from home frequently for extended periods of time, he corresponded often with his family by mail. Alonzo Mather was a direct descendant of the Reverend Richard Mather, grandfather of Cotton Mather.

Alonzo Mather attended Fairfield Seminary, and upon graduation, was allowed to choose between continuing his education in college or entering the workforce in business. He chose to forego college and went straight into work in Utica, New York, when he was 16. After gaining work experience there, he moved to Quincy, Illinois; and then to Chicago in 1875.

He married Martha C. Johnson and had one daughter by her; Martha J. Mather on April 28, 1879. Shortly after his daughter's birth, his wife died. Alonzo Mather remarried after her death to Louise Eames.

== Starting his own businesses ==
In Chicago, Mather started a wholesale business called Alonzo C. Mather and Company. It was while Mather was working here that he first developed a more humane stock car for the shipment of livestock by rail. Mather's design amenities for the livestock included feeding and watering facilities that had previously been unapplied to railroad rolling stock. By 1881, he had started the Mather Stock Car Company to build stock cars based on his design. Mather's stock car innovations were considered so valuable to livestock shipping that the American Humane Society awarded him a medal for the humane treatment of animals in 1883. Soon, Mather cars were in revenue service on a large number of railroads in North America.

Mather recognized that many railroads would be willing to reduce their operating expenses by leasing rolling stock rather than purchasing or building it, so his company began leasing the cars that it produced — a practice that helped keep the company solvent through the Great Depression of the 1930s.

Throughout his time in Chicago, Mather never forgot his home in New York. In 1893 he proposed a design for an international harbor on the waterways around Fort Erie, Ontario/ Buffalo, New York. Mather's plans included new electrical generation plants at the falls; his plans conflicted with those of other electricity companies in the area, and Mather's plan was eventually abandoned. The US-Canada Peace Bridge was constructed at that location within his lifetime, but it was not based on any of Mather's plans.

== Death and legacy ==
Upon his death in Los Angeles, California, Alonzo Mather's estate totaled around US$5 million, $3 million of which was bequeathed to build the Alonzo Mather Aged Ladies' Home in Evanston, IL, and another $15,000 to build a new Episcopal church in his family's home town of Fairfield, NY.

The former headquarters of the Mather Stock Car Company; the Mather Tower still stands in Chicago's elegant downtown area. The tower was designated as a Chicago Historic Landmark in 2001.

Mather LifeWays began as a gift distributed in 1941 from Alonzo's estate.

Mr. Mather's interment location is at Forest Lawn, Glendale. It is a private room just to the left of the main entrance of The Great Mausoleum.
