= Samuel Johnson Jr. =

American lexicographer (1757–1836)

Samuel Johnson Jr. (March 10, 1757 – August 20, 1836) was the author of the first English dictionary compiled by an American, A school dictionary: being a compendium of the latest and most improved dictionaries. It was printed in New Haven, in 1798, by Edward O'Brien. Martha Jane Gibson, from Yale University, sees Samuel Johnson Jr. as America's first lexicographer. He was a schoolteacher, born in the town of Guilford, Connecticut.

Although he was a contemporary of British lexicographer Dr. Samuel Johnson, they were not related in any way. The coincidence of names leads many people to believe that the British Johnson was the author of the dictionary. Rather, Samuel Johnson Jr. was from an old Guilford family; his father was a clothier, and his great-uncle was the Rev. Dr. Samuel Johnson (1696–1772), noted theologian, and first President of King's College (now Columbia University). (The New York Times has Johnson Jr. as the son of the theologian, though this seems less likely.)

Also according to the New York Times, the British Museum has an edition presumed perfect, while the copy held by Yale University Library is the so-called 'Brinley copy', which lacks pages 157–168 out of the total 198. There are no other known extant copies.
