= Mather Stock Car Company =

Rolling stock manufacturer

The Mather Stock Car Company was a U.S. corporation that built railroad rolling stock. Mather specialized in stock cars, but built other types of cars as well, including boxcars. The company was headquartered in Chicago, Illinois. Their main headquarters building, Mather Tower, built in 1928 in Chicago, still stands today. This building has the smallest floors of any of Chicago's skyscrapers.

== History ==
Mather was founded by Alonzo C. Mather; the company's first stock car was built in 1880. As the 20th century dawned, Mather began leasing stock cars to the railroads that used them. Railroads of the time found it less expensive to lease stock cars than to purchase them outright or to build them. By the 1920s, Mather had expanded their fleet to include boxcars and refrigerator cars along with a few tank cars.

With the onset of the Great Depression in the US, Mather was one of a limited number of companies that saw profits in the 1930s. As railroads eliminated freight cars out of their own fleets, leasing companies such as Mather were able to step in and supply freight cars as needed.

In the late 1950s Mather was merged into the North American Car Corporation of Chicago.

== Preservation ==
Several examples of Mather's stock cars exist in museums, but only eight of the hundreds of box cars that Mather built survive to this day. One, Akron, Canton and Youngstown Railroad #3024, is owned by the Pacific Southwest Railway Museum Association (operators of the San Diego Railroad Museum), while the remaining seven are owned by the Mid-Continent Railway Museum in North Freedom, Wisconsin.
