= Stock car (rail) =

Rolling stock used for carrying livestock on railways

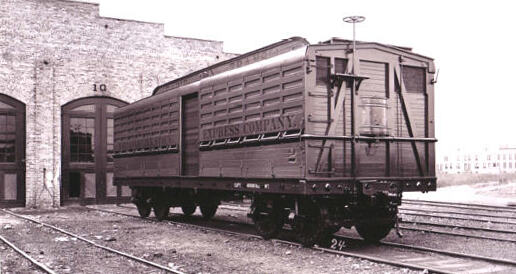
An early Pullman Palace Car Company livestock car design from the late 19th century

In railroad terminology, a stock car or cattle car is a type of rolling stock used for carrying livestock (not carcasses) to market. A traditional stock car resembles a boxcar with louvered instead of solid car sides (and sometimes ends) for the purpose of providing ventilation; stock cars can be single-level for large animals such as cattle or horses, or they can have two or three levels for smaller animals such as goats, sheep, pigs, and poultry. Specialized types of stock cars have been built to haul live fish and shellfish and circus animals such as camels and elephants. Until the 1880s, when the Mather Stock Car Company and others introduced "more humane" stock cars, death rates could be quite high as the animals were hauled over long distances. Improved technology and faster shipping times have greatly reduced deaths.

== Initial use and development ==
Rail cars have been used to transport livestock since the 1830s. The first shipments in the United States were made via the Baltimore and Ohio Railroad in general-purpose, open-topped cars with semi-open sides. Thereafter, and until 1860, the majority of shipments were made in conventional boxcars that had been fitted with open-structured iron-barred doors for ventilation. Some railroads constructed "combination" cars that could be utilized for carrying both live animals and conventional freight loads.

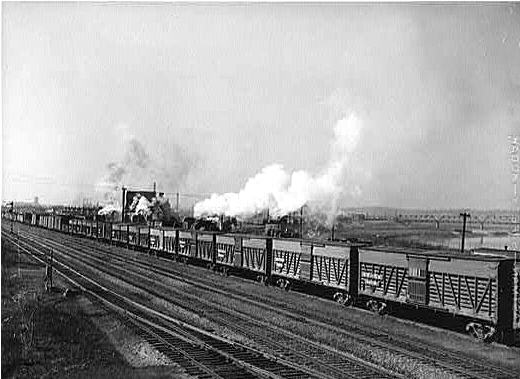
Stock cars make up part of an eastbound Santa Fe freight train in March, 1943

Getting food animals to market required herds to be driven hundreds of miles to railheads in the Midwest, where they were loaded into stock cars and transported eastward to regional processing centers. Driving cattle across the plains led to tremendous weight loss, and a number of animals were typically lost along the way. Upon arrival at the local processing plant, livestock were either slaughtered by wholesalers and delivered fresh to nearby butcher shops for retail sale, smoked, or packed for shipment in barrels of salt.

The suffering of animals in transit as a result of hunger, thirst, and injury was considered by many to be inherent to the shipping process, as was the loss in weight during shipment. A certain percentage of animal deaths on the way to market was even considered normal (6% for cattle and 9% for sheep on average, according to a congressional inquiry), and carcasses of dead animals were often disposed of along the tracks to be devoured by scavengers, though some were sold to glue factories or unscrupulous butchers. Increased train speeds reduced overall transit times, though not enough to offset the deleterious conditions the animals were forced to endure.

Some of the early railroad companies attempted to alleviate the problems by adding passenger cars to the trains that hauled early stock cars. The New Jersey Railroad and Transportation Company followed this practice as early as 1839, and the Erie Railroad advertised that livestock handlers could ride with their herds in special cabooses. These early passenger accommodations were the predecessors of the later "drovers caboose" designs that were used until the mid-20th century. Railroad operating rules for livestock and handlers that rode the trains were very limited, as the handlers were private contractors or employees of the shippers, not employed by the railroads. A 1948 rulebook for the Atchison, Topeka and Santa Fe Railway, for example, lists only one rule regarding livestock:

... Wishes of attendants regarding care of livestock should be ascertained and assistance rendered in caring for such shipments. ... In absence of special instructions, hog shipments should be watered as necessary. Particular attention must be given to stock unaccompanied by attendants."

However, even with livestock handlers and faster schedules, many stock cars were still listed on company rosters with open roofs and very little in the way of improved conditions for the livestock themselves. Most railroads resisted the call for as long as possible from shippers for improvements to cars specifically designed to carry livestock. The railroads generally preferred to use standard boxcars because that type of car proved much more versatile in the number of different types of loads it could carry.

When the railroads and cattle industry failed to act quickly enough to correct these perceived deficiencies, the government and even the general public went into action. Claims were made that the meat of neglected animals was unfit for human consumption. In 1869, Illinois passed the first laws to limit the animals' time on board and required them to be given 5 hours' rest for every 28 in transit. Some railroads stepped in with their own new designs at this time, such as the Pennsylvania Railroad's class KA stock car, a design first published in 1869 which featured a removable second deck for transporting pigs or sheep. However, double-deck stock cars had been experimented with as early as the 1830s on the Liverpool and Manchester Railway in England. Other states such as Ohio and Massachusetts soon followed with similar legislation, though effective federal laws were not enacted until the passing of the Federal Meat Inspection Act of 1906.

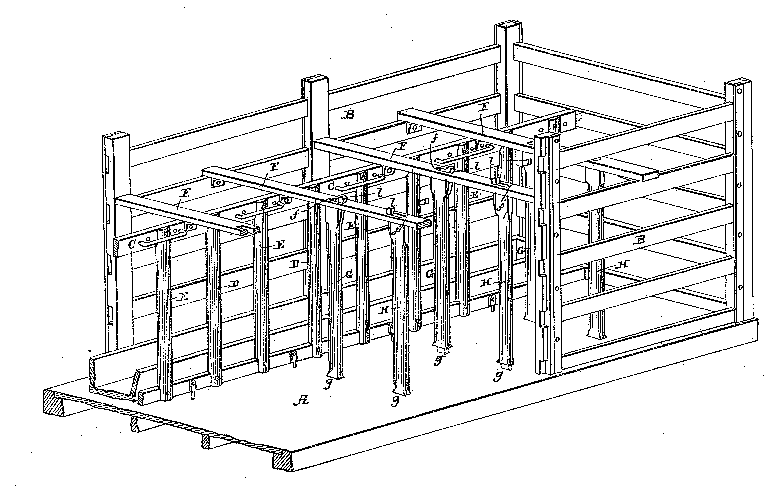
The diagram from U.S. patent 106,887 showing a cutaway view of Zadok Street's stock car design

The first patented stock car designs that actually saw use on American railroads were created by Zadok Street. Street's designs (U.S. patent 106,887 and U.S. patent 106,888, both issued on August 30, 1870) were first used in 1870 on shipments between Chicago and New York City. They were designed for trips to take 90 hours between the two cities and included water troughs fed from tanks under the floor, and food troughs fed from hoppers in the roof. Street's design proved impractical as each car could carry only 6 steers. Alonzo Mather, a Chicago clothing merchant who founded the Mather Stock Car Company, designed a new stock car in 1880 that was among the first practical designs to include amenities for feeding and watering the animals while en route. Mather was awarded a gold medal in 1883 by the American Humane Association for the humane treatment afforded to animals in his stock cars. Minneapolis' Henry C. Hicks patented a convertible boxcar/stock car in 1881, which was improved in 1890 with features that included a removable double deck. George D. Burton of Boston introduced his version of the humane stock car in 1882, which was placed into service the following year. The Burton Stock Car Company's design provided sufficient space so as to allow the animals to lie down in transit on a bed of straw.

In 1880, American railroads rostered around 28,600 stock cars. With innovations developed by Mather, Hicks and others, this number nearly doubled in 1890 to 57,300 and nearly tripled in 1910 to 78,800. During this period, the cars' capacities also increased. In the 1870s few stock cars were built longer than 28 ft (8.53 m), and could carry about 10 short tons (9.1 t; 8.9 long tons) of stock. Car lengths increased to an average of 34 ft (10.36 m) in the 1880s and stock cars of this period regularly carried 20 short tons (18.1 t; 17.9 long tons) of stock.

Certain costly inefficiencies were inherent in transporting live animals by rail, particularly because some sixty percent of the animal's mass is inedible matter. Even after the humane advances cited above were put into common practice, many animals weakened by the long drive died in transit, further increasing the per-unit shipping cost. The ultimate solution was to devise a method to ship dressed meats from regional packing plants to East Coast markets in the form of a refrigerated boxcar.

== Refrigerated cars ==
A number of attempts were made during the mid-19th century to ship agricultural products via rail car. In 1857, the first consignment of dressed beef was carried in ordinary boxcars retrofitted with bins filled with ice. Detroit's William Davis patented a refrigerator car that employed metal racks to suspend the carcasses above a frozen mixture of ice and salt. He sold the design in 1868 to George Hammond, a Chicago meatpacker, who built a set of cars to transport his products to Boston.

In 1878, meat packer Gustavus Swift hired engineer Andrew Chase to design a ventilated car, one that proved to be a practical solution to providing temperature-controlled carriage of dressed meats and allowed Swift & Company to ship their products all over the United States, and even internationally. The refrigerator car radically altered the meat business. Swift's attempts to sell Chase's design to the major railroads were unanimously rebuffed, as the companies feared that they would jeopardize their considerable investments in stock cars, animal pens, and feedlots if refrigerated meat transport gained wide acceptance.

In response, Swift financed the initial production run on his own, then—when the American railroads refused his business—he contracted with the Grand Trunk Railway (who derived little income from transporting live cattle) to haul the cars into Michigan and then eastward through Canada. In 1880 the Peninsular Car Company (subsequently purchased by ACF) delivered to Swift the first of these units, and the Swift Refrigerator Line (SRL) was created. Within a year the Line's roster had risen to nearly 200 units, and Swift was transporting an average of 3,000 carcasses a week to Boston. Competing firms such as Armour and Company quickly followed suit.

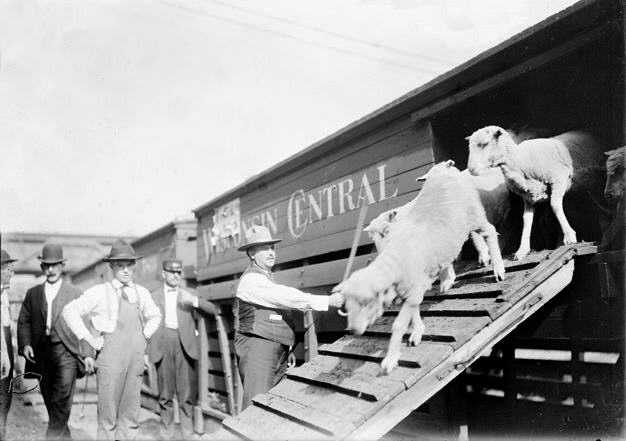
Sheep are unloaded from the upper level of a Wisconsin Central stock car in Chicago, Illinois in 1904

Live cattle and dressed beef deliveries to New York (short tons):

	(Stock Cars)	(Refrigerator Cars)
Year	Live Cattle	Dressed Beef
1882	366,487	2,633
1883	392,095	16,365
1884	328,220	34,956
1885	337,820	53,344
1886	280,184	69,769

The subject cars travelled on the Erie, Lackawanna, New York Central, and Pennsylvania railroads.

== Specialized applications ==
=== Horse cars ===
For many decades, racehorse owners regarded the railway as the quickest, cheapest, safest, and most efficient medium of equine transport. The horse express car allowed the animals (in some instances) to leave home the morning of a race, theoretically reducing stress and fatigue.

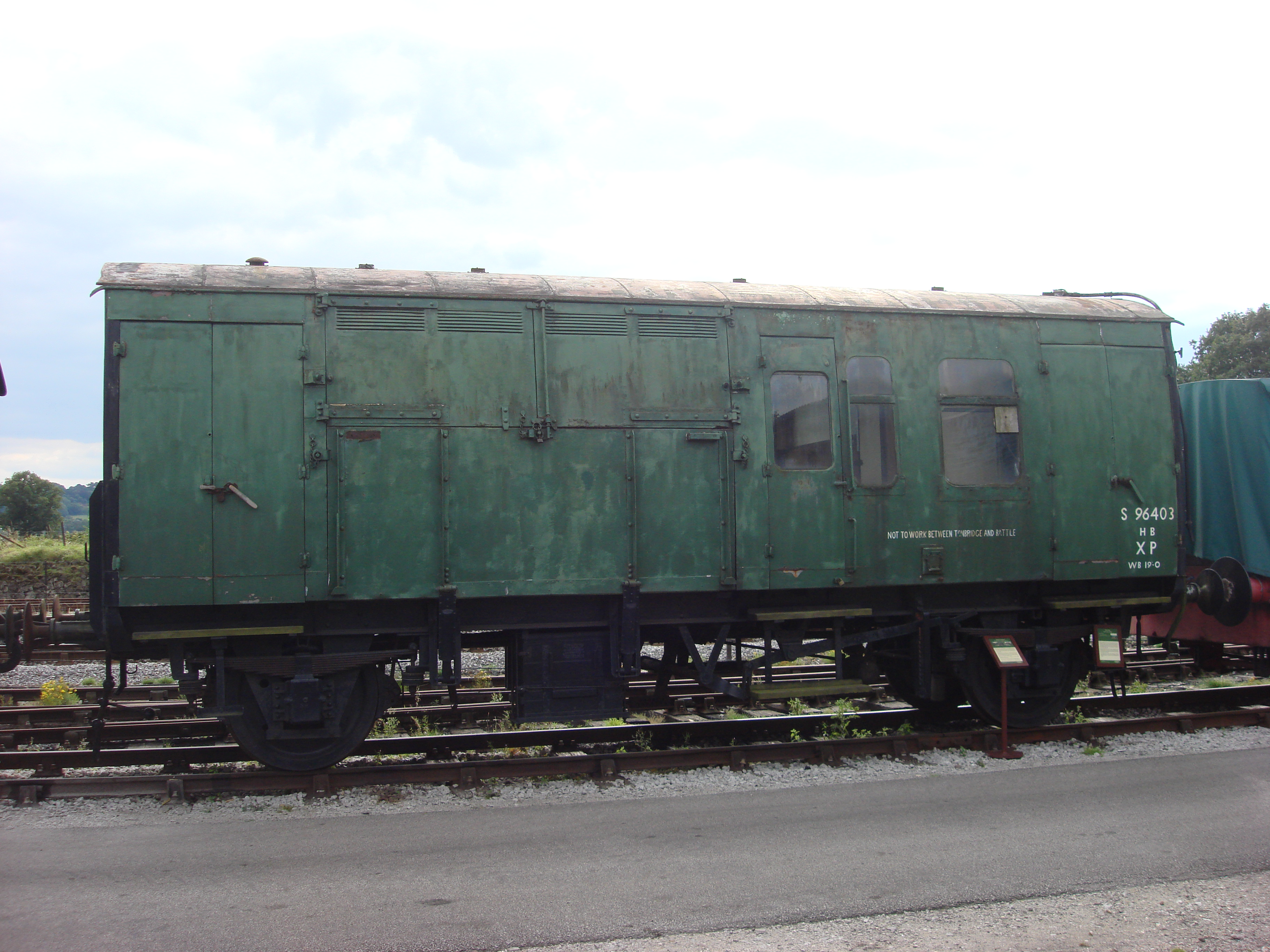
Former British Railways horse box no. S96403, built 1958; the door with a window opens into the grooms' compartment.

As early as 1833 in England, specially padded boxcars equipped with feeding and water apparatus were constructed specifically for transporting draft and sport horses. In the United States, however, horses generally traveled in conventional stock cars or ventilated boxcars. Early on, the need for improved methods for tethering horses in boxcars, while at the same time allowing a horse enough room to maintain its balance while in transit, was recognized.

Racehorses, and those kept as breeding stock, were highly valued animals that required special handling. In 1885 a livery and stable operator from Toledo, Ohio by the name of Harrison Arms formed the Arms Palace Horse Car Company to service this market niche. Arms' cars resembled the passenger cars of the day; they featured clerestory roofs and end platforms and came equipped with passenger car trucks (as they were intended for passenger train service). The units were segregated into two separate compartments, each containing eight individual stalls. By the late 1880s Arms had acquired two competing firms, Burton and Keystone. While the cars operated by George D. Burton closely resembled the Arms design, the Keystone Company's cars were much more utilitarian in design as they were intended for transporting animals of lesser value and inclusion in standard freight train consists. The Keystone fleet eventually grew to more than 1,000 cars.

Many of the cars finished out their days in maintenance of way (MOW) service.

=== Circus use ===
Many circuses, especially those in the United States in the late-19th and early-20th centuries, featured animals in their performances. Since the primary method of transportation for circuses was by rail, stock cars were employed to carry the animals to the show locations.

The Ringling Brothers and Barnum and Bailey Circus, which traveled America by rail until it closed in 2017, used special stock cars to haul its animals. When a Ringling Brothers train is made up, these cars are placed directly behind the train's locomotives to give the animals a smoother ride. The cars that Ringling Brothers used to haul elephants were custom-built with extra amenities for the animals, including fresh water and food supply storage, heaters, roof-mounted fans and water misting systems for climate control, treated, non-slip flooring for safety and easy cleaning, floor drains that operate whether the train is moving or not, backup generators for when the cars are uncoupled from the locomotives, and specially designed ramps for easy and safe loading and unloading. Some of the cars also have built-in accommodation for animal handlers so they can ride with and tend to the animals.

=== Fish cars ===
In the 1870s the railroads of America were called upon to transport a new commodity, live fish. The fish were transported from hatcheries in the Midwest to locations along the Pacific coast, to stock the rivers and lakes for sportfishing. The first such trip was made in 1874, when Dr. Livingston Stone of the U.S. Fisheries Commission (which later became the United States Fish and Wildlife Service) "chaperoned" a shipment of 35,000 shad fry to stock the Sacramento River in California. The fish were carried in open milk cans stowed in a conventional passenger car. Stone was required to change the water in the cans every two hours when fresh water was available. The majority of the fish made the trip successfully and the result was a new species of shad for western fishermen.

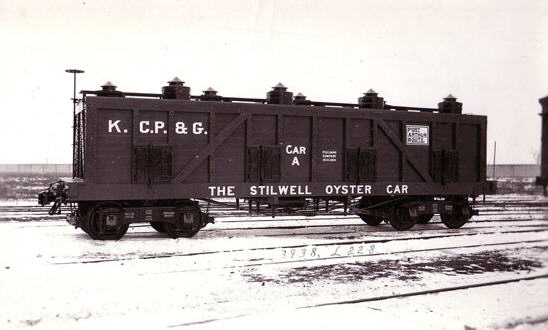
The 30-short-ton (27.22 t; 26.79-long-ton) capacity "Stillwell Oyster Car," built by Pullman in 1897, was a wooden tank car designed by Arthur E. Stilwell for transporting live oysters from Port Arthur, Texas to Kansas City, Missouri by rail.

In 1881, the Commission contracted and built specialized "fish cars" to transport live fish coast-to-coast. The technologies involved in hauling live fish improved through the 1880s as new fish cars were built with icing capabilities to keep the water cool, and aerators to reduce the need to change the water so frequently. Some of the aerators were designed to take air from the train's steam or air lines, but these systems were soon deprecated as they had the potential to reduce the train's safe transit; the air lines on a train were used in later years to power the air brakes on individual railroad cars.

Fish cars were built to passenger train standards so they could travel at higher speeds than the typical freight trains of the day. Also, by putting fish cars into passenger trains, the cars were held at terminals far less than if they were hauled in freight trains. Fish car services, throughout their use, required that the fish keepers ride along with the cargo; a typical fish car crew consisted of five men, including a "captain" who would coordinate the transportation and delivery, several "messengers" who would serve as freight handlers and deliverymen, and a cook to feed the crew. The cargo's need for speedy transportation and passenger amenities for the crew necessitated the cars' inclusion in passenger trains.

Fish car operations typically lasted only from April through November of each year, with the cars held for service over the winter months. The cars became a novelty among the public and were exhibited at the 1885 New Orleans Exhibition, the 1893 Chicago World's Fair, and the 1901 Pan-American Exposition in Buffalo, New York. As fish cars became more widely used by hatcheries, they were also used to transport regional species to non-native locations. For example, a fish car would be used to transport lobster from Massachusetts to San Francisco, California, or to transport dungeness crab back from San Francisco to the Chesapeake Bay.

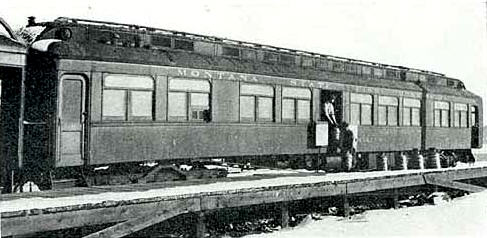
The Thymallus, a "fish car" of the Montana State Fish Service, c. 1910. The attendants are loading stainless steel milk cans filled with fish onto the car.

The first all-steel fish car was built in 1916. Fish car technology improved again in the early 1920s as the milk cans that had been used were replaced by newer tanks, known as "Fearnow" pails. The new tanks were about 5 pounds (2.27 kg) lighter than the milk cans and included integrated containers for ice and aeration fittings. One 81-foot (24.69 m) long car, built in 1929, included its own electrical generator and could carry 500,000 young fish up to 1 inch (2.54 cm) long. Fish car use declined in the 1930s as fish transportation shifted to a speedier means of transport by air, and to trucks as vehicle technology advanced and road conditions improved. The US government operated only three fish cars in 1940; the last of the fleet was taken out of service in 1947.

In 1960, Wisconsin Fish Commission "Badger Car#2" was sold to the Mid-Continent Railway Historical Society, where it is being restored as part of the Society's collection of historic rolling stock. 2

=== Poultry cars ===
From about 1890 to 1960, shipping live chickens and other birds by rail in special "henhouses on wheels" was commonplace. The cars featured wire mesh sides (which were covered with cloth in the winter to protect the occupants) and a multi-level series of individual coops, each one fitted with feed and water troughs. An attendant traveled on board in a central compartment to feed and water the animals. The cars were also equipped with a coal stove that provided heat for the center of the car.

The concept is thought to have been the brainchild of William P. Jenkins, a freight agent for the Erie Railroad. Jenkins collaborated with a Muncie, Indiana poultry dealer by the name of James L. Streeter on the design of a specialized car designed solely for transporting live fowl. The Live Poultry Transportation Company was formed about the same time that the first poultry car patent was issued (U.S. patent 304,005, issued August 26, 1884). By 1897, the company had 200 units in operation.

The Continental Live Poultry Car Company, a rival concern, was founded in 1890. Continental thought to dominate the market by offering larger cars, capable of transporting as many as 7,000 chickens in 120 coops, but the oversized cars failed to gain wide acceptance, and the firm closed its doors after just a few years in business.

== Modern conversions ==
In the 1960s, the Ortner Freight Car Company of Cincinnati, Ohio developed a triple-deck hog carrier for the Northern Pacific Railway based on the design of 86-foot (26.21 m) long "hi-cube" boxcar called the "Big Pig Palace." They later brought out a double-deck version called the "Steer Palace" that hauled livestock between Chicago and later Kansas City to slaughterhouses in Philadelphia and northern New Jersey until the early to mid-1980s on Penn Central and Conrail intermodal trains.

The Union Pacific Railroad, in an effort to earn more business hauling hogs from Nebraska to Los Angeles for Farmer John Meats, converted a large number of 50-foot (15.24 m) auto parts boxcars into stock cars. Originally built by Gunderson Rail Cars in Portland, Oregon for the Missouri Pacific Railroad, the conversions were done by removing the boxcars' side panels and replacing them with panels that included vents that could be opened or closed. The tri-level cars featured built-in watering troughs.

Strings of 5-10 of these "HOGX" cars were, until the mid-1990s, hauled twice weekly at the front of double-stack intermodal freight trains. However, this service was terminated when Farmer John Meats shifted to hogs produced locally in California. The units have since been scrapped.

== See also ==
- Cattle wagon
- Deportation
- Livestock trailer
