= 1923 in rail transport =

This article lists events related to rail transport that occurred in 1923.

== Events ==
=== January events ===
- January 1 – All major railways in Great Britain are amalgamated into the "Big Four" companies, the Great Western Railway, London & North Eastern Railway, London, Midland & Scottish Railway and Southern Railway, under terms of Railways Act 1921.
- January 30 – Canadian National (CN) absorbs the Grand Trunk Railway and spins off the portion of the Grand Trunk within the United States to form the Grand Trunk Western Railroad (GTW); CN operates GTW as a subsidiary railroad. National ownership encourages freight rates favoring use of Canadian seaports in the Maritimes, and causes declining freight volumes over the New England line to Grand Trunk seaport facilities in Portland, Maine.

=== February events ===
- February 7 – London & North Eastern Railway (Great Britain) takes delivery of express passenger 4-6-2 steam locomotive Flying Scotsman from its Doncaster Works.

=== March events ===
- March 10 – Norfolk & Western Railroad (United States) takes delivery of its first Y3a Class 2-8-8-2 steam locomotive from ALCO.

=== April events ===
- April 1 – Yamaguchi Line, Ogori (Shin-Yamaguchi) to Masuda route officially completed in Japan, a direct passenger express service start from October 1961.

=== July events ===
- July 6 – Ongarue railway disaster: In New Zealand, about 6:00 am, the southbound Auckland to Wellington express rounds a sharp bend and ploughs into a landslip which had fallen across the railway line near Ongarue, just north of Taumarunui. 17 passengers die and 28 others are injured.
- July 11 – The Ofoten Line in Norway takes electric traction into use.
- July 15 – Warren G. Harding, President of the United States, drives the golden spike on the Alaska Railroad.

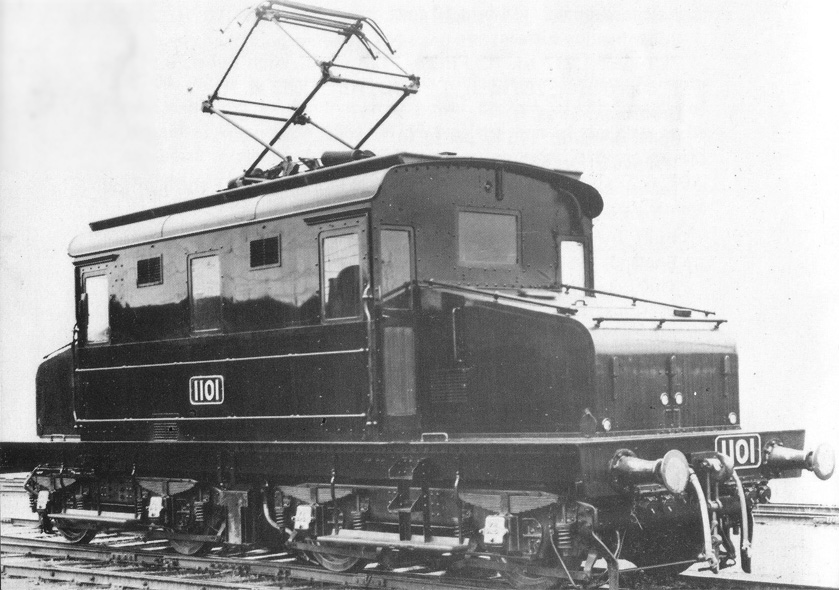
Victorian Railways E class 1100

- July 18 – In the United States, Fruit Growers Express (FGE) and the Great Northern Railway form the Western Fruit Express (WFE) in order to compete with the Pacific Fruit Express and Santa Fe Refrigerator Despatch in the west.
- July 20 – First Victorian Railways electric locomotive, #1100 built at its Newport Workshops, is placed into freight service in Melbourne, Australia.

=== August events ===
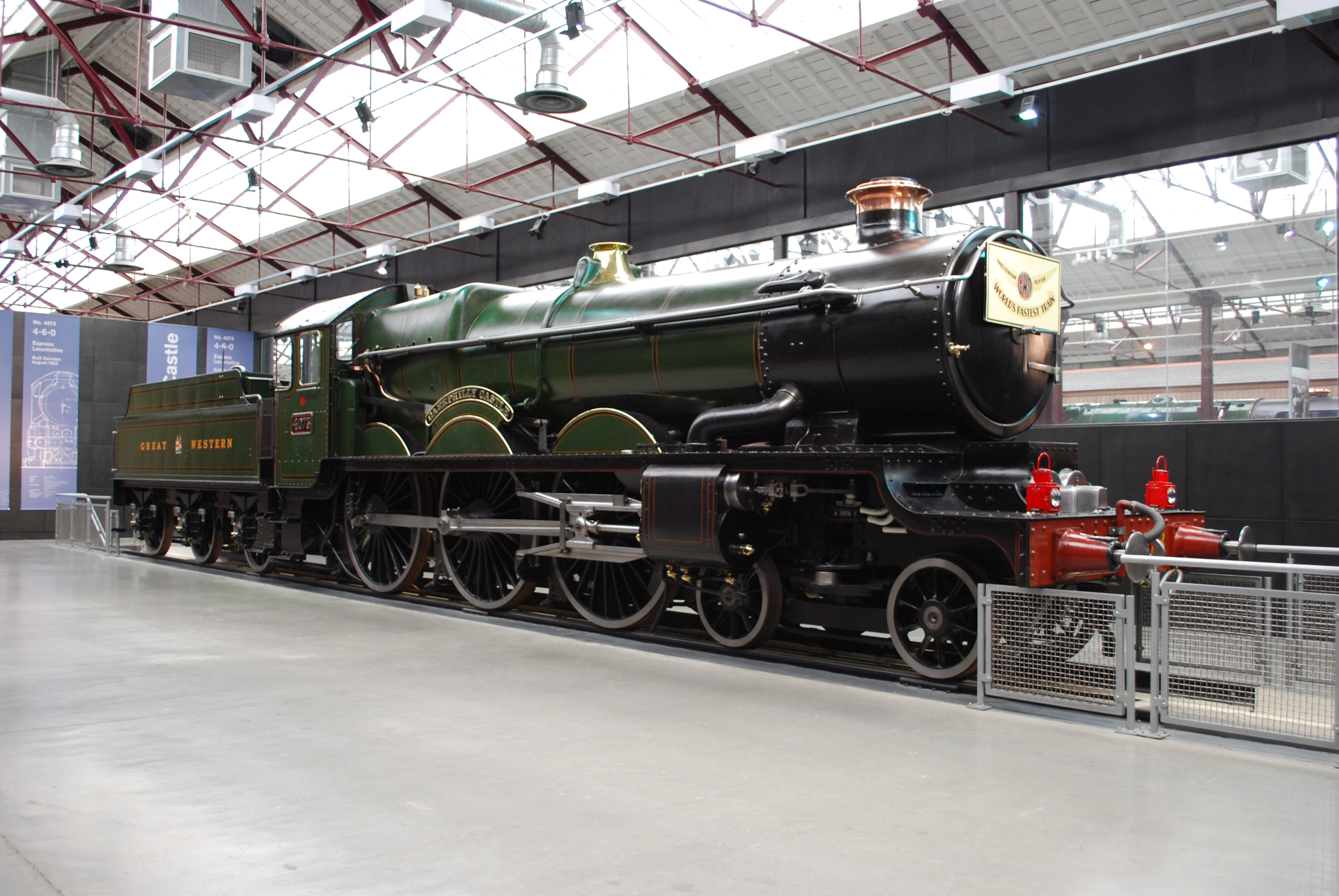
No. 4073 Caerphilly Castle

- August 1 – City of Glasgow (Scotland) takes over operation of the Glasgow Subway.
- August 4 – The Otira Tunnel (8.5 km) on the Midland Line in New Zealand opens, worked by electric traction; construction had started in 1907 and at opening it is the longest in the British Empire (and remains the longest in South Island).
- August 11 – Great Western Railway (Great Britain) places the first of its 'Castle' Class 4-6-0 express passenger steam locomotives from its Swindon Works, No. 4073 Caerphilly Castle, into service.

=== September events ===
- September 27 – Following soon after the washout of Chicago, Burlington & Quincy Railroad's bridge over Coal Creek (near Glenrock, Wyoming), a passenger train falls through the washout, killing 30 of the train's 66 passengers. The accident is the worst railroad accident in Wyoming's history.

=== Unknown date events ===
- U.S. Interstate Commerce Commission allows Southern Pacific's control of the Central Pacific Railroad to continue, ruling that it is in the public's interest.
- Munising, Marquette & Southeastern Railway and Lake Superior and Ishpeming Railway merge to form the Lake Superior & Ishpeming Railroad.
- The Gold Coast Government Railway's Accra–Kumasi direct line is completed.

== Births ==
=== Unknown date births ===
- Robert R. Dowty, construction foreman for the Jupiter and 119 steam locomotive replicas at the Golden Spike National Historic Site at Promontory, Utah (died 2004).
- Margaret Landry Moore, "Miss Southern Belle" spokesmodel for Kansas City Southern's Southern Belle passenger trains (died 2005).
- Frank Turpin, CEO of Alaska Railroad, 1985–1993 (died 2005).

== Deaths ==
=== April deaths ===
- April 10 – Stuyvesant Fish, president of Illinois Central 1887–1907 (born 1851).

=== May deaths ===
- May 16 – George Jay Gould I, eldest son of Jay Gould, president of the Denver & Rio Grande Western Railroad and the Western Pacific Railroad (born 1864).

=== October deaths ===
- October 25 – Henry Ivatt, Chief Mechanical Engineer of Great Northern Railway of England 1896–1911 (born 1851).

=== December deaths ===
- December 5 – Sir William Mackenzie, part owner of Toronto Street Railway, builder of Canadian Northern predecessors (born 1849).
- December 10 – Thomas George Shaughnessy, president of Canadian Pacific 1899–1918 (born 1853).
