= Western Fruit Express =

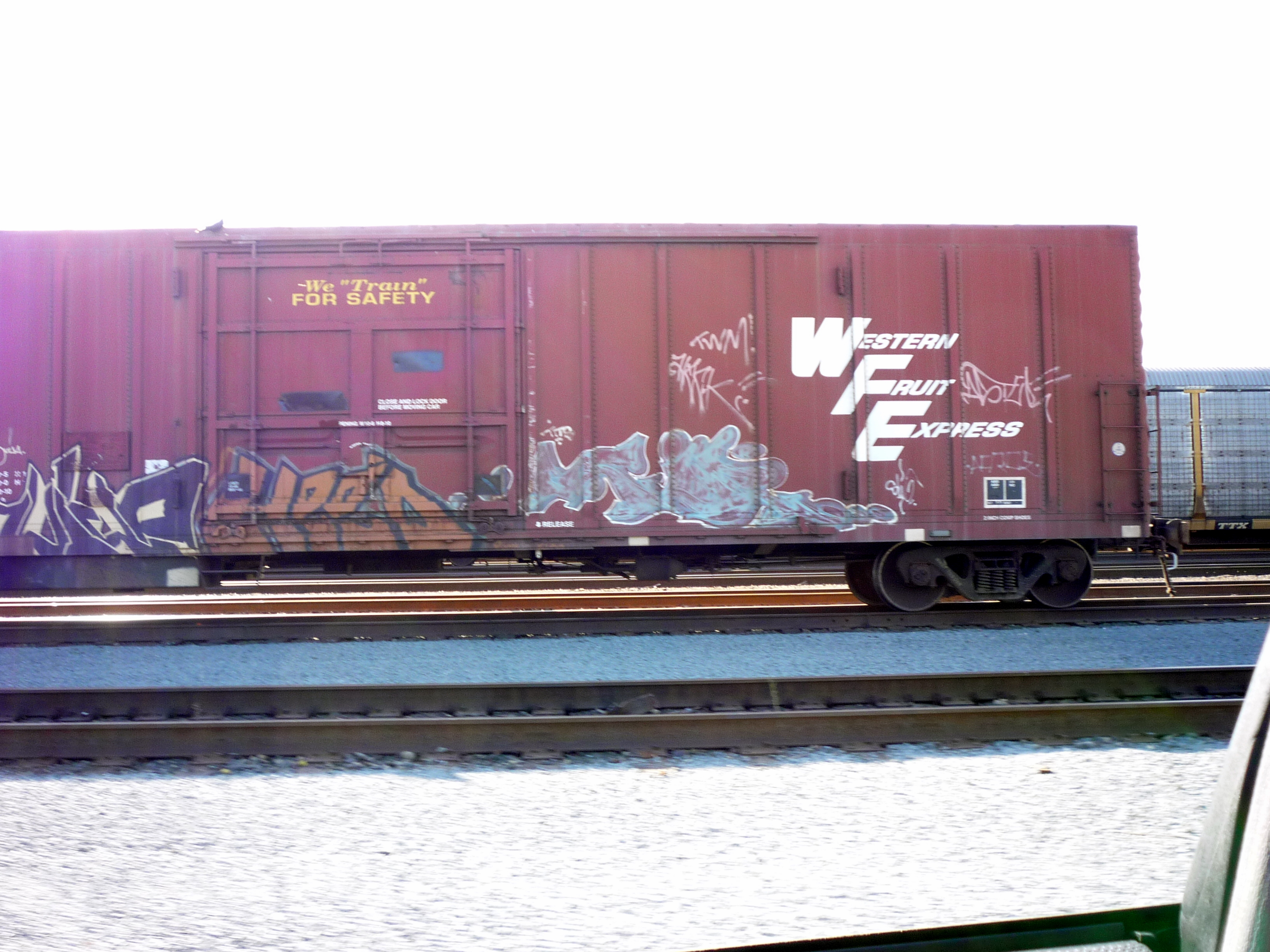
WFE car detail, taken in 2009.

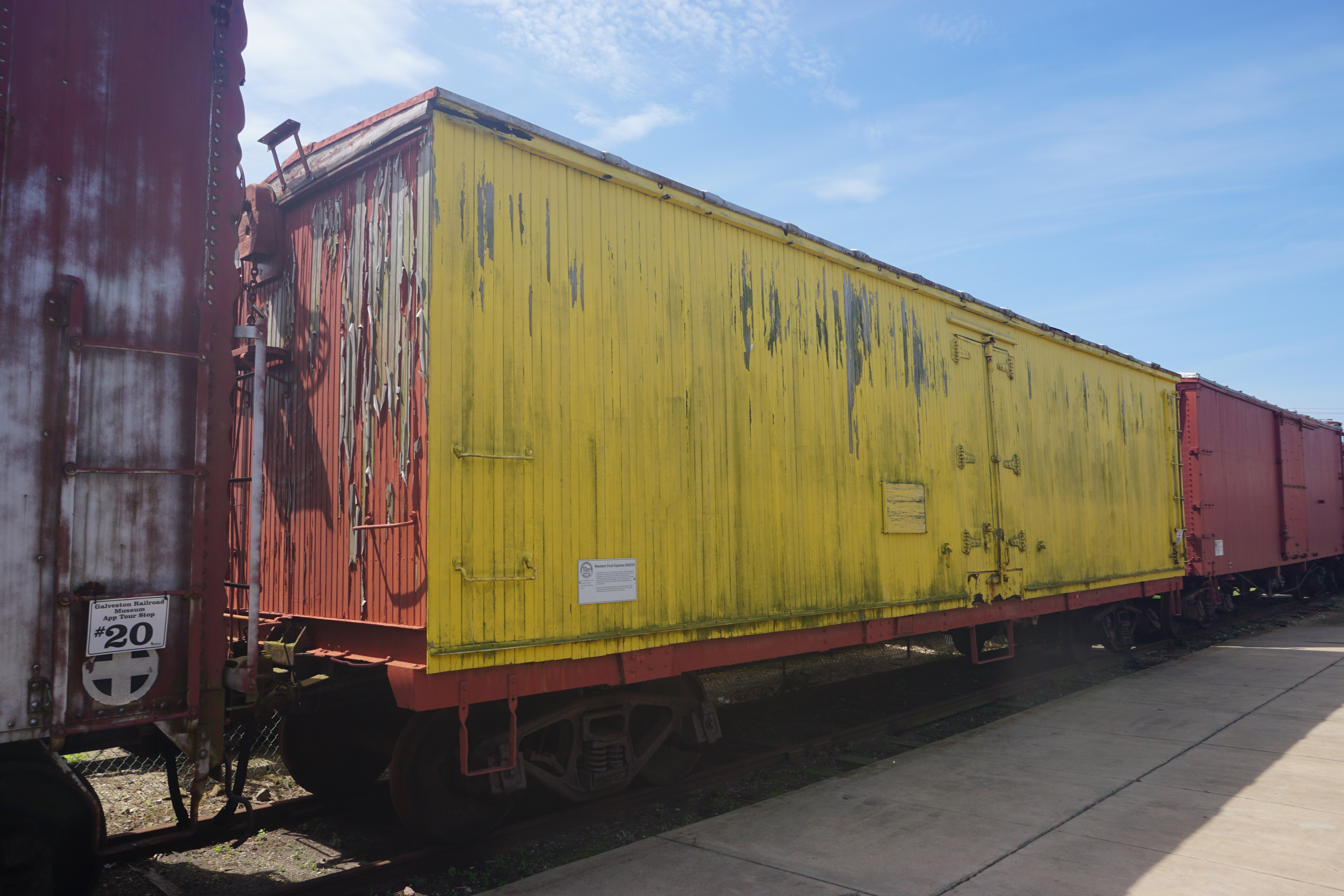
Western Fruit Express Refrigerator Car No. 66354 at the Galveston Railroad Museum

Western Fruit Express (WFE) was a railroad refrigerator car leasing company formed by the Fruit Growers Express and the Great Northern Railway on July 18, 1923 in order to compete with the Pacific Fruit Express and Santa Fe Refrigerator Despatch in the Western United States. The arrangement added 3,000 cars to the FGE's existing equipment pool. It is now a wholly owned subsidiary of the Burlington Northern Santa Fe Corporation (BNSF), the Great Northern's successor. The success of the WFE led to the creation of the Burlington Refrigerator Express (BREX) in May 1926.

Western Fruit Express Roster, 1930–1970:

1930	1940	1950	1960	1970
7,177	7,036	5,265	5,702	5,893

Source: The Great Yellow Fleet, p. 17.
