= 1926 in rail transport =

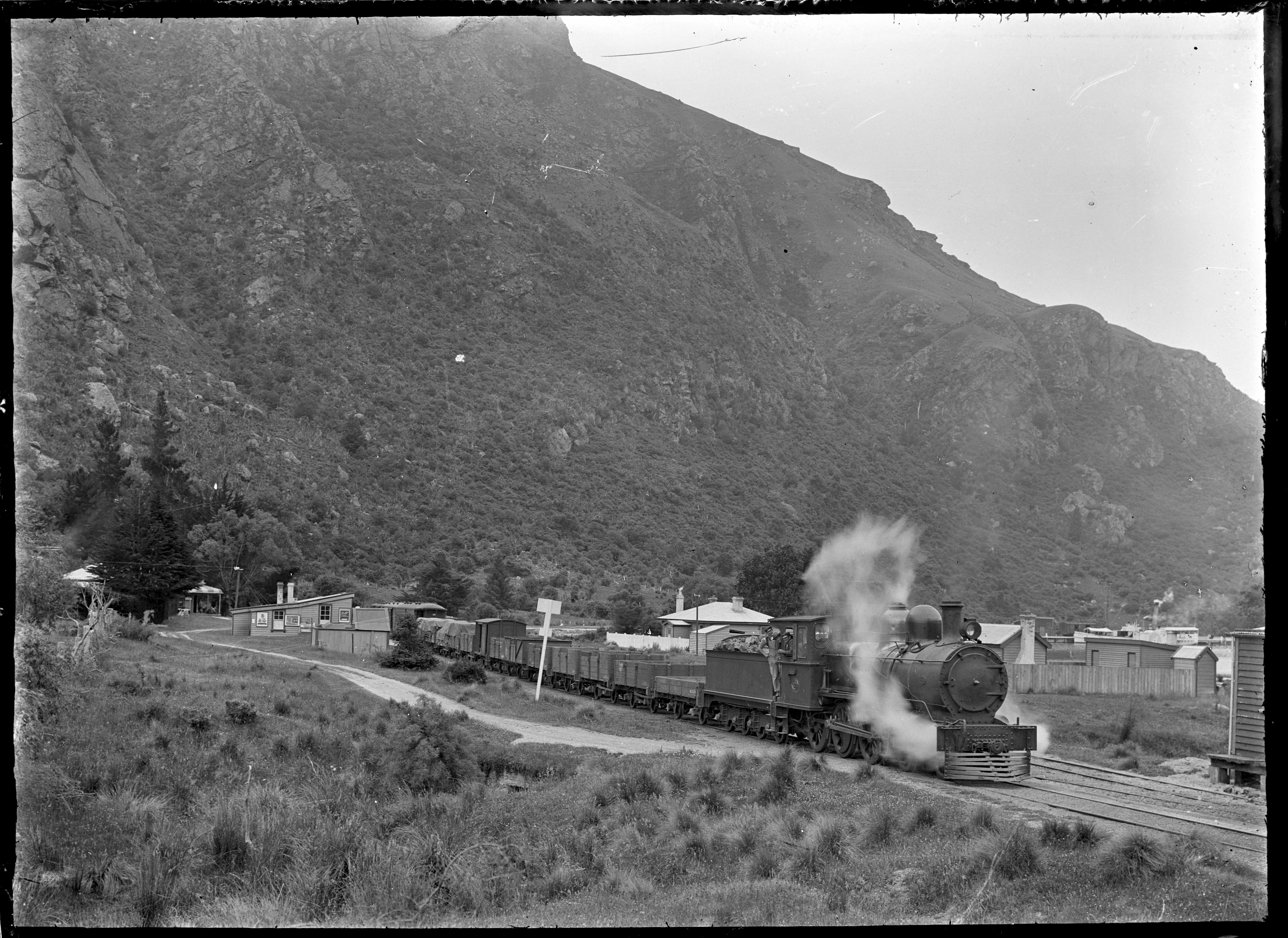
"Ua" 177 steam locomotive, taken in Kingston, New Zealand in 1926

This article lists events related to rail transport that occurred in 1926.

== Events ==
=== March events ===
- March 14 - El Virilla train accident in Costa Rica: 248 people are killed when an overloaded pilgrim special derails on a bridge.

=== May events ===
- May 1 - Burlington Refrigerator Express (BREX) is formed as a joint venture between the Chicago, Burlington & Quincy Railroad (CB&Q) and the Fruit Growers Express (FGE).
- May 3 - UK General Strike commences, continuing to affect railways until May 12.
- May 8 - Asa Randolph organizes the Brotherhood of Sleeping Car Porters, considered a major labor as well as civil rights milestone.
- May 20 - The United States Railway Labor Act becomes law.

=== July events ===
- July 6 - First electric railway in the Soviet Union opens, connecting Baku, Azerbaijan, with its oil workers’ suburban settlements.
- July 9 - The first use of a radiotelephone on a train, on the New York Central Railroad.
- July 23 - Law enacted to nationalize rail transport in Belgium fully as Société Nationale des Chemins de fer Belges/Nationale Maatschappij der Belgische Spoorwegen.

=== August events ===
- August - The Milwaukee Road introduces the Arrow passenger train between Chicago, Illinois and Omaha, Nebraska.

=== September events ===
- September 12 - The Chemin de Fer du Nord in France introduces the Flèche d’Or all-first-class Pullman boat train service between Paris and Calais.

=== October events ===
- October 10 – Yachihata Station in Japan is opened.

=== December events ===
- December 20 – Opening of first section of underground railway in Australia, the City Circle between Central and St James stations in Sydney.

=== Unknown date events ===
- Atlantic Coast Line Railroad gains control of the Atlanta, Birmingham & Coast Railroad.
- American Car & Foundry acquires the J. G. Brill Company.

== Deaths ==
=== October deaths ===
- October 20 - Eugene Debs, American labor leader, founding member of the Brotherhood of Locomotive Firemen, founder of the American Railway Union, arrested during the Pullman strike in Chicago, Illinois (born 1855).
