= JBS USA =

American meat processor

JBS USA Holdings, Inc.
- Type: Subsidiary
- Traded as: (as Esmark) NYSE: ESMK (no longer trading)
- Industry: Meatpacking
- Founded: 1855; 171 years ago
- Founder: Gustavus Franklin Swift
- Headquarters: Greeley, Colorado, U.S.
- Key people: Wesley Batista Filho (CEO)
- Revenue: ▲US$27.8 billion (2017)
- Number of employees: 78,000+
- Parent: JBS S.A.
- Subsidiaries: Plumrose USA; Pilgrim's; Primo Smallgoods
- Website: jbsfoodsgroup.com

JBS USA Holdings, Inc. is a meat processing company and a wholly owned subsidiary of the Brazilian multinational JBS S.A. The subsidiary was created when JBS entered the U.S. market in 2007 with its purchase of Swift & Company.

JBS USA is based in Greeley, Colorado. Its competitors include Hormel Foods, Cargill, Smithfield Foods, National Beef, and Tyson Foods.

== History ==
=== Swift & Company ===
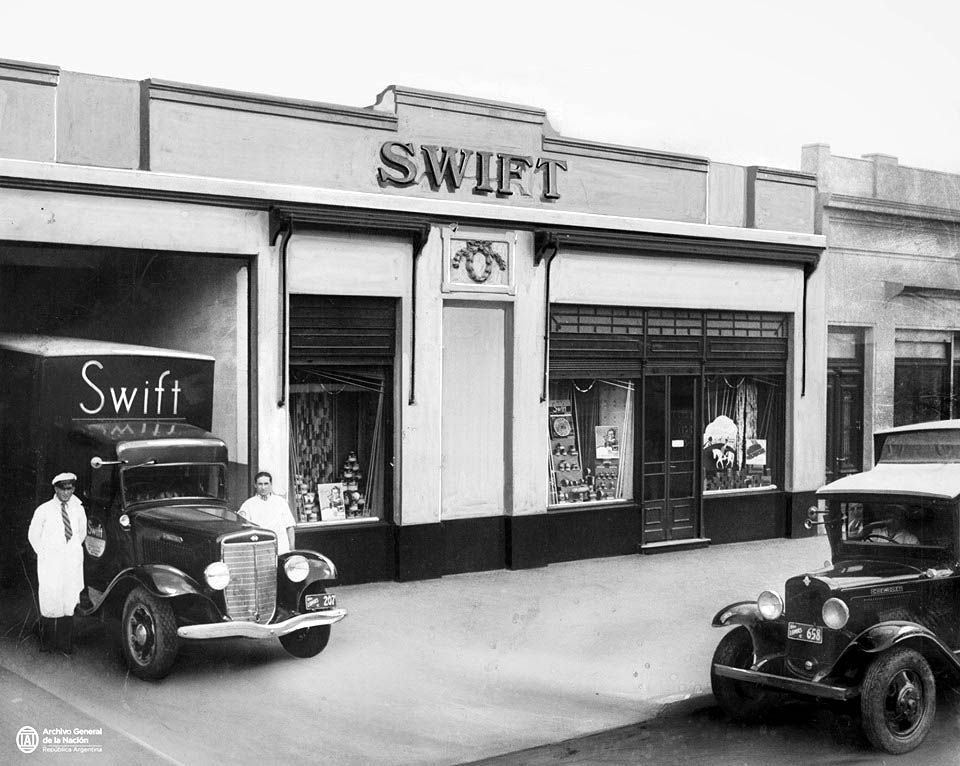
Swift meat packing plant in La Plata, Argentina, c. 1920

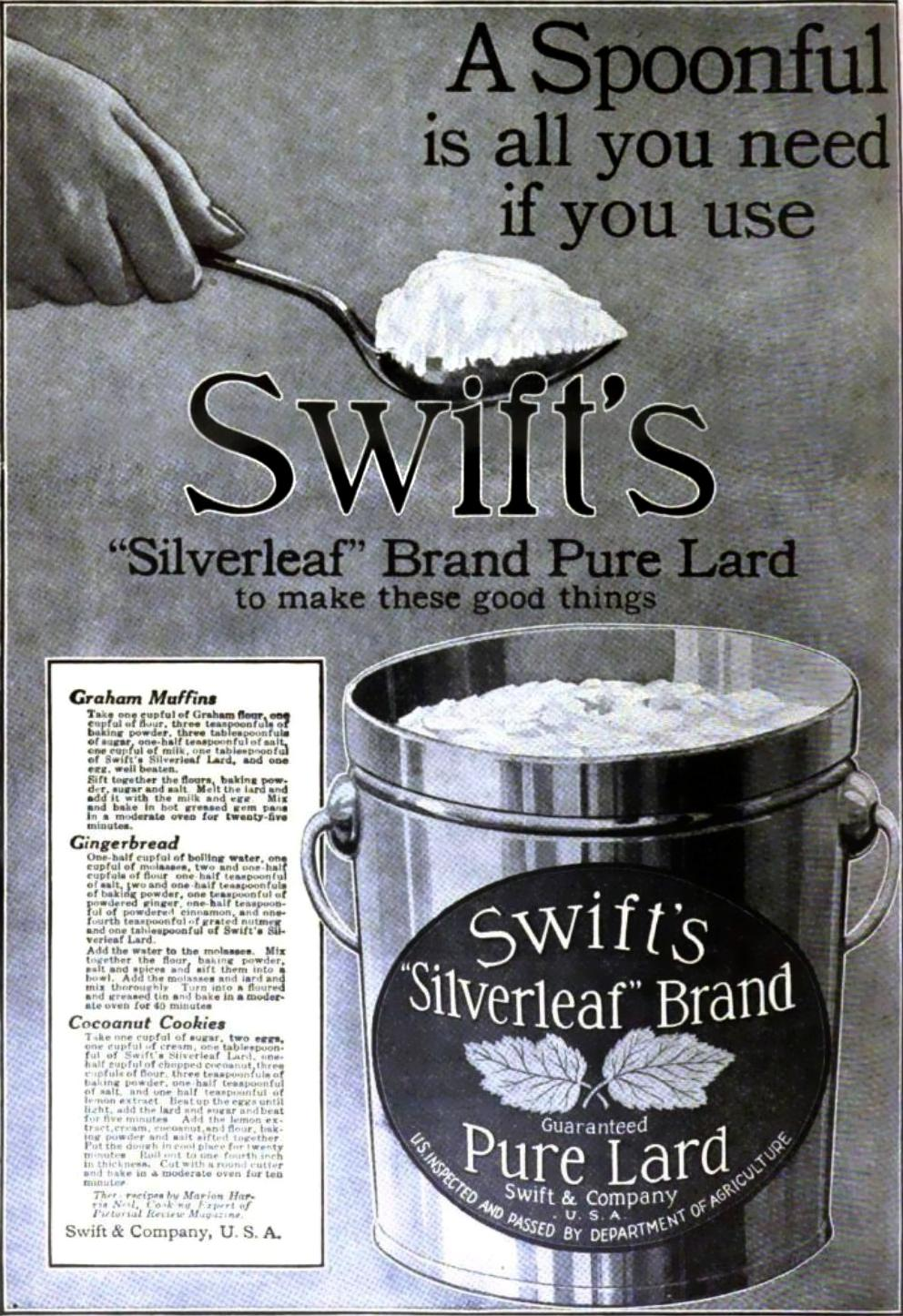
1916 advertisement for lard

Swift & Company operations can be traced back to 1855, when 16-year-old Gustavus Franklin Swift founded a butchering operation in Eastham, Massachusetts. Its early origins on Cape Cod led later to locations in Brighton (in Massachusetts), and Albany, and Buffalo, New York. In 1875, Swift and Company was incorporated in Chicago. Swift and Armour and Company acquired a two-thirds controlling interest in the Fort Worth Stockyards in 1902. That same year, an antitrust lawsuit was filed against Swift for conspiring with other companies to control the meatpacking industry. The companies attempted to merge to avoid the suit, leading to the 1905 Supreme Court case of Swift & Co. v. United States.

By the 1920s Swift and Company operated their largest and newest meat processing plant in South St Paul, Minnesota. The purpose of this plant was to slaughter and process cattle, hogs, and sheep. These animals were procured by the company buyers at the adjacent St. Paul Union Stockyards. The live animals were driven across overhead ramps to the killing floors. Swift processed fresh, smoked, table-ready, canned meats, such as Prem, and baby foods, along with soap, lard, shortening, adhesives, chemicals, pharmaceuticals, fertilizers, hides and animal feeds. Operations were discontinued at the South St. Paul Plant effective November 29, 1969.

In addition to meatpacking, Swift sold various dairy and grocery items, including Swiftning shortening, Allsweet margarine, Brookfield butter, cheese under the Brookfield, Pauly, and Treasure Cave brands, and Peter Pan peanut butter. Swift began selling frozen turkeys under the Butterball brand in 1954. Gustavus Swift also championed the refrigerated railroad car.

=== Esmark and ConAgra ===
In the 1960s, Swift expanded into a lot of other fields, including insurance and petroleum, and formed the holding company Esmark in 1973. Two years later, Esmark bought International Playtex from Meshulam Riklis' Rapid-American Corporation. Esmark sold off Globe Life Insurance to the Ryan Insurance Group in 1977.

Esmark left the petroleum business in 1980, selling Vickers Petroleum to Mobil, while Swift's fresh-meat business was spun off as a separate company, Swift Independent Packing Company (SIPCO), the same year. Esmark went on to purchase Norton Simon Inc. in 1983 before being purchased by Beatrice Foods the next year. ConAgra purchased 50% of SIPCO in 1987 and the remaining portion in 1989, the same year ConAgra bought Beatrice Foods. ConAgra merged SIPCO's operations with that of Monfort, the meatpacker it had purchased in 1987, and the division was renamed Swift & Company in 1995.

In 2002, ConAgra sold a majority stake in Swift & Company to Hicks, Muse, Tate & Furst, a Dallas-based private-equity firm, and Booth Creek Management. Hicks, Muse bought the remainder of ConAgra's stake in 2004.

=== Purchase by JBS ===
Logo used from 2007 to 2023.

On July 12, 2007, JBS S.A. purchased Swift & Company for US$1.5-billion in an all-cash transaction, creating the JBS Swift Group and positioning it as the largest beef processor in the world. Prior to the deal, JBS operated 23 plants in Brazil and five in Argentina. As part of the transaction, the Swift companies undertook a series of tender offers and consent solicitations to restructure existing debt.

Following the acquisition, JBS expanded its U.S. operations through a series of additional purchases. In 2008, it acquired the beef operations of Smithfield Foods for $565 million. The same year, it announced plans to acquire National Beef Packing Company for $560 million, but canceled the purchase after the U.S. Department of Justice raised antitrust concerns. In 2009, JBS USA acquired a 63% stake in poultry producer Pilgrim's Pride. It later increased its ownership share to 75.3%.

In 2009, JBS USA Holdings filed notice with the SEC of its intention to float an IPO, listing 38 subsidiaries. However, the offering was withdrawn after BDO Seidman LLP, one of the accounting firms involved, filed notice with the SEC that unaudited statements had been submitted without its endorsement.

On October 18, 2012, JBS USA announced it would assume temporary management of XL Foods' Lakeside beef processing plant in Brooks, Alberta, under a 60-day agreement that included an exclusive purchase option for XL Foods' U.S. and Canada operations. The acquisition was completed in January 2013 and included the Brooks facility, a second beef plant in Calgary, and a feedyard. In July 2015, JBS USA acquired the U.S. pork processing business of Cargill Meat Solutions for $1.45 billion.

In May 2021, JBS S.A. was the target of a ransomware cyberattack that temporarily disrupted its meat processing operations across the United States. JBS paid the hackers an $11 million ransom in Bitcoin.

== Legal and regulatory issues ==
=== Animal welfare ===
On December 2, 2010, JBS announced that it would use Arrowsight, a remote video auditing company, to monitor proper sanitation to prevent cross contamination during processing, as well as to monitor their cattle for proper animal welfare practices. Despite this, in July 2018, undercover footage from a Kentucky supplier showed that workers were physically abusing pigs, and that the facility was still using gestation crates.

In August 2024, the USDA found that JBS was using human-grade antibiotics in beef labelled as free from antibiotics, contributing to the human antibiotic resistance crisis.

=== Environmental standards ===
In 2019, the Center for Biological Diversity and Food & Water Watch filed a lawsuit against JBS, claiming that it had been violating the Clean Water Act for five years by dumping toxic waste into a Colorado river. In 2020, JBS sought to dismiss the lawsuit, but was rejected by a federal district court.

In March 2021, following evidence from investigative journalist Dom Phillips that linked JBS to illegal deforestation of the Amazon rainforest, JBS pledged that it would take nine years to stop its illegal deforestation and 29 years to reach net-zero greenhouse gas emissions. It was the first global meat company to make such a claim. Despite this, in March 2024, New York Attorney General Letitia James sued JBS USA for violating the state's general business laws on deceptive practices and false advertising, alleging that JBS initiated its "Net Zero by 2040" marketing campaign before even identifying its Scope 3 emissions arising from the full supply chain of meat production.

=== Food safety and quality ===
On June 24, 2009, the USDA's Food Safety and Inspection Service announced that JBS Swift Beef Company recalled about 41,280 lb (18,720 kg) of beef products that were exposed to E. coli O157:H7 contamination. By June 30, the recall included over 421,000 lb (191,000 kg) of beef.

On December 22, 2010, the Grain Inspection, Packers and Stockyards Administration assessed a $175,000 civil penalty against JBS/Swift for violations of the Packers and Stockyards Act for failing to disclose when missing Fat-O-Meat'er data prevented JBS from calculating the lean percentage of a particular pork carcass or carcasses in a seller's lot, and artificially substituting an undisclosed lean value for carcasses with missing data when calculating carcass-merit payment at some processing plants.

=== Immigration raids ===
In December 2006, six Swift & Company meat-packing facilities in Colorado, Nebraska, Texas, Utah, Iowa, and Minnesota were raided by United States Immigration and Customs Enforcement (ICE) officials, resulting in the apprehension of 1,282 undocumented immigrants from Mexico, Guatemala, Honduras, El Salvador, Peru, Laos, Sudan, and Ethiopia. Nearly 200 were criminally charged after a ten-month investigation into identity theft, including Swift & Company HR representatives who had advised illegal immigrants on how to be hired at the company.

=== Labor standards ===
On November 4, 2010, the Federal Motor Carrier Safety Administration ordered JBS Carriers, a subsidiary of JBS, to install electronic on-board recorders on their trucks after a compliance review found "serious violation" of federal work and rest period restrictions.

The JBS facility in Greeley, Colorado came into national focus during the COVID-19 outbreak when at least 50 workers tested positive by April 10, 2020, and two workers died of the disease. By April 14, a third worker died. President Donald Trump referred to the case in the daily White House briefing on April 10. All workers were supposed to be tested during the Easter holidays, with the plant being closed until April 24, 2020. However, when this testing did not occur, a JBS company spokesman announced that workers would be quarantined. The plant reopened after a 9-day closure. By April 15, 102 workers had tested positive for the coronavirus and four had died. COVID-19 outbreaks were also detected in six other JBS beef processing plants, in Souderton, Pennsylvania; Plainwell, Michigan; Green Bay, Wisconsin; Cactus, Texas; Grand Island, Nebraska; and Hyrum, Utah.

=== Price-fixing allegations ===
In 2018, a class-action lawsuit was filed against JBS, along with other major pork producers including Hormel Foods, Seaboard, Smithfield Foods, and Tyson Foods, accusing the companies of conspiring to artificially raise the price of pork via the tech platform Agri Stats, forcing consumers and restaurants to pay inflated prices for pork products. In October 2022, JBS agreed to pay $20 million to settle the lawsuit.

In 2022, JBS agreed to a $52.5 million settlement in a lawsuit that accused JBS, National Beef, Cargill, and Tyson Foods of working together to drive up the price of beef. In 2024, McDonald's sued JBS and the same three other companies along with their subsidiaries for more of this same alleged price fixing.

=== Relationship with the Trump administration ===
In 2019, the Trump administration allocated $62.4 million to JBS USA from a fund intended to help U.S. farmers affected by the trade war with China. The U.S. Department of Agriculture announced a contract the same year to purchase $22.3 million worth of pork from the company. Secretary of Agriculture Sonny Perdue and Attorney General Jeff Sessions requested the U.S. Department of Justice to investigate a possible case of corruption. There were also indications that JBS benefited from trade tensions with increased sales in China. JBS stated that despite being a foreign company, it supports American farmers by creating job opportunities. In May 2019, Representative Rosa DeLauro claimed that President Donald Trump was unaware of the situation.

In May 2022, the United States House Select Oversight Subcommittee on the Coronavirus Crisis released a report detailing the relationship between the Trump administration and the meat packing industry during the COVID-19 pandemic. The report describes the CEO of JBS (along with the CEOs of Tyson and Smithfield) asking the secretary of agriculture, Sonny Perdue, about elevating the need for workers to stay present at work, despite the risk of working in close quarters during the pandemic.

In January 2025, JBS subsidiary Pilgrim's Pride contributed $5 million to the second inauguration of Donald Trump, making it the largest single donor to the inauguration fund. In May 2025, the Securities and Exchange Commission approved the listing of JBS S.A. on the New York Stock Exchange. Following the approval, Senator Elizabeth Warren authored a letter to JBS USA and Pilgrim's Pride executives expressing concern that the company donated to the inauguration fund to gain influence over the Trump administration's regulatory decisions.

In September 2026 Joesley Batista, the Brazilian billionaire who controls a large part of JBS meat packing plants, lobbied with Trump in an attempt to lower the tariffs on imported beef. This has brought farmers to believe Trump has caused issue when it comes to selling their own livestock. The countries mentioned for imports specifically are Brazil and Argentina. Some are concerned due to Brazilian beef being deemed unsafe for sale in the EU due to unregulated drug use in their cattle. Similarly, Argentina's beef has been found to carry carcinogens. Many people concerned for their families safety are boycotting companies that work with JBS due to these practice changes. McDonald's and Walmart are just a few on that list. Many are turning to local butchers or fast food places like Culvers as a replacement.

== See also ==
- Cactus, Texas, location of a JBS meatpacking plant
- Impact of the COVID-19 pandemic on the meat industry in the United States
- Porter Jarvis, chairman and president of Swift & Co., 1955–1967
- Swift Packing Company building (Sioux City, Iowa), listed in the National Register of Historic Places (demolished)
- Swift Refrigerator Line
