= Swift Refrigerator Line =

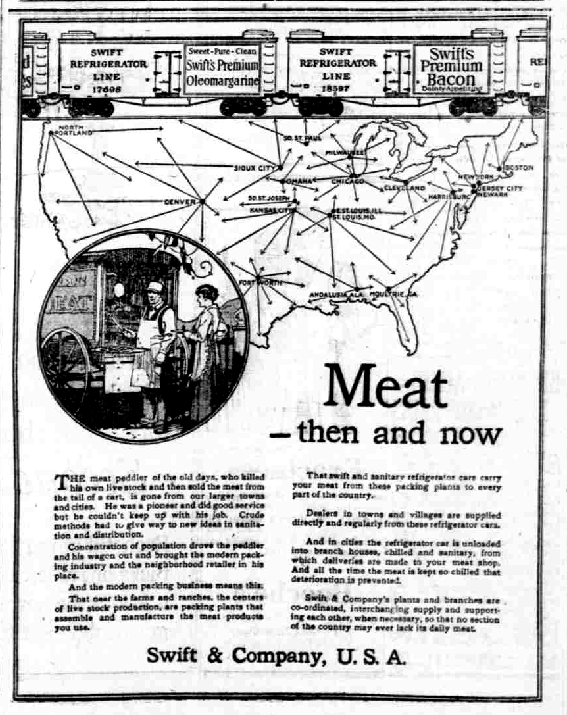
Ad for the line from 1921. Shows sample Swift cars at the top and a map of the distribution locations.

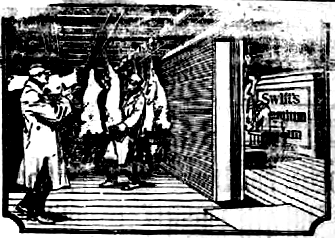
Inside a Swift refrigerator can, hanging the sides of beef while an inspector looks on.

The Swift Refrigerator Line (SRL, also known as the Swift Refrigerator Transportation Company) was a private refrigerator car line established around 1875 by Chicago meat packer Gustavus Swift, the founder of Swift and Company. The line pre-dated mechanical refrigeration and relied on ice. Swift hoped to develop an alternative to transporting live cattle across the Midwest. He experimented by moving dressed (cut) meat using a string of ten boxcars which ran with their doors removed, and made a few test shipments to New York City during the winter months over the Grand Trunk Railway (GTR). The method proved too limited to be practical. In 1878, Swift hired engineer Andrew Chase to design a ventilated car that was well-insulated, and positioned the ice in a compartment at the top of the car, allowing the chilled air to flow naturally downward. The meat was packed tightly at the bottom of the car to keep the center of gravity low and to prevent the cargo from shifting. Chase's design proved to be a practical solution to providing temperature-controlled carriage of dressed meats, and allowed Swift & Company to ship their products all over the United States, and even internationally, and in doing so radically altered the meat business.

A Swift refrigerated boxcar sits idle at East Orange, New Jersey. The car has been repainted to remove the original "billboard" advertising after such displays on freight cars were banned by the ICC in 1937.

Swift's attempts to sell this design to the major railroads were unanimously rebuffed as the companies feared that they would jeopardize their considerable investments in stock cars and animal pens if refrigerated meat transport gained wide acceptance. In response, Swift financed the initial production run on his own, then — when the American roads refused his business — he contracted with the Grand Trunk Railway (who derived little income from transporting animals "on-the-hoof") to haul them into Michigan and then eastward through Canada.

In 1880 the Peninsular Car Company (subsequently purchased by ACF) delivered to Swift the first of these units, and the Swift Refrigerator Line (SRL) was created. Within a year the Line’s roster had risen to nearly 200 units, and Swift was transporting an average of 3,000 carcasses a week to Boston. Competing firms such as Armour and Company quickly followed suit. By 1920 the SRL owned and operated 7,000 of the ice-cooled rail cars. The General American Transportation Corporation assumed ownership of the line in 1930.

Swift Refrigerator Transportation Company Roster, 1900–1930:

| 1900 | 1910 | 1920 | 1930 |
| 3,550 | 5,000 | 7,000 | 7,000 |

Source: The Great Yellow Fleet, p. 17.
