= Swift Packing Company building (Sioux City, Iowa) =

- Midland Packing Company
- Formerly listed on the U.S. National Register of Historic Places
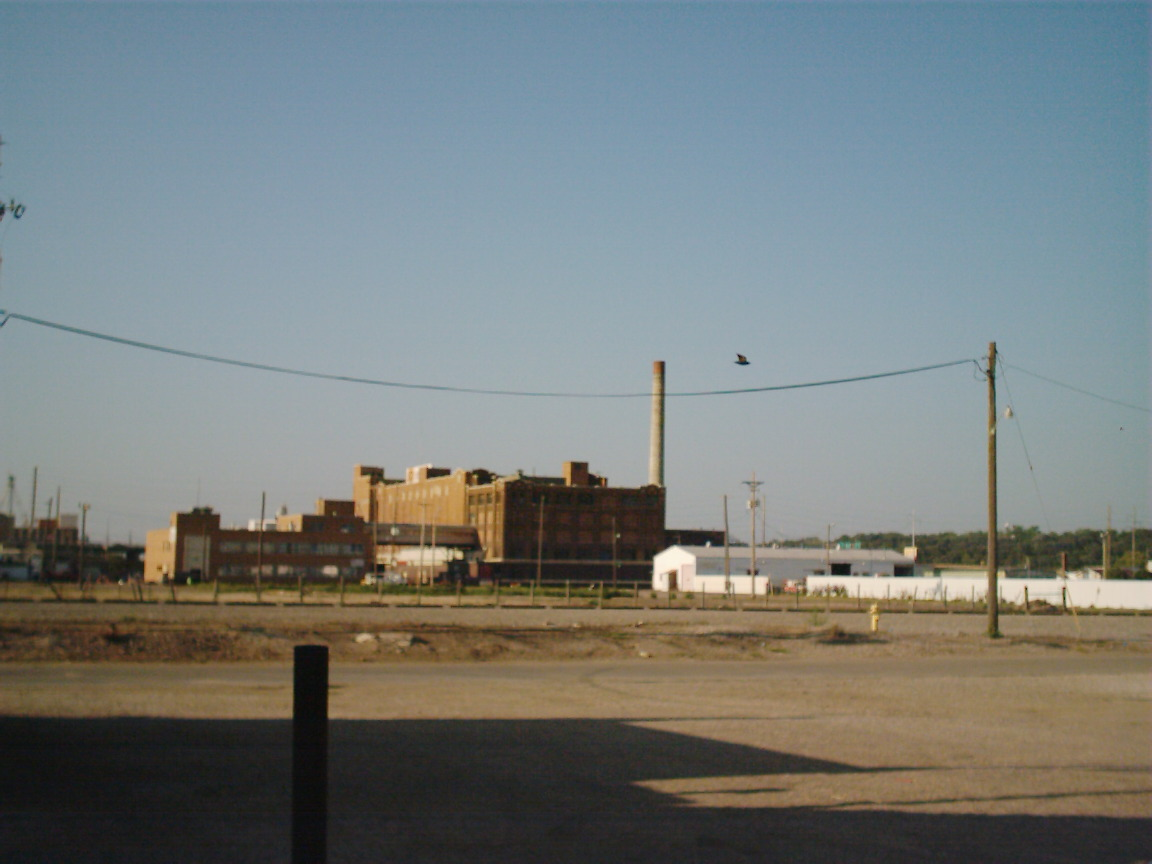
- KD Station in 2005

- Location within Iowa
- Location: Sioux City, Iowa
- Coordinates: 42.488305°N 96.383646°W
- Built: 1918–19
- NRHP reference No.: 79000952

Significant dates
- Added to NRHP: 1979
- Removed from NRHP: March 7, 2019

The Swift & Co. meatpacking plant in Sioux City, in the state of Iowa in the Midwestern United States, was built in 1918–19 as a speculative venture under the name Midland Packing Plant. After going into receivership, it was acquired by Swift & Co. in 1924, and continued to operate until 1974. It was then purchased by a Sioux City businessman and converted to an enclosed mall, the KD Stockyards Station. The building was listed in the National Register of Historic Places in 1979.

Fire and water damage in 2004 forced its closing, and the building was demolished in 2010. It was delisted from the National Register of Historic Places in 2019.

== History ==
From 1917 to 1925, the convergence of several economic factors gave rise to a speculative bubble in meat-packing plants in the United States. Meat prices had risen significantly following the nation's entry into World War I, and it was believed that this increase had been produced by collusion among the major packers, who thus benefited from artificially high profits from the sale of meat products. In 1919, moreover, the market for liberty bonds declined, driving investors to seek better returns; meat production appeared to offer this. The combination of these factors led to a number of speculative and downright fraudulent ventures, in which independent packing operations were established, shares were sold to unwary investors, and much of the money was transferred to company officers and politicians, after which the operation went bankrupt.

Four such operations were established in Iowa, and developed to various degrees. The Associated Packing Company plant in Des Moines never progressed beyond the acquisition of a second-hand hog-scraping machine. The Farmers' Mutual Packing Company operation in Muscatine went so far as to acquire a used building and paint its name on the door. The Corn Belt Packing Company plant in Dubuque, in the quondam Dubuque Brewing and Malting Co. buildings, operated for three years before closing.

The Midland Packing Company in Sioux City was incorporated in 1918. A building in the Sioux City stockyards, designed by Chicago architectural firm Gardner and Lindberg, was constructed in 1918–19, at an estimated cost of $3 million. Packing operations begin in January 1920, and ceased in May 1920 when the plant went into receivership.

In 1921, Wilson & Co., a major Chicago meatpacker, took an option on the plant, but did not exercise it. In 1924, the facility was sold at auction for $623,000 to Swift & Co., then the largest meatpacker in the world. Swift re-opened the plant in March 1924.

In 1938–39, a strike closed the plant for 119 days. A second strike in 1948 left the plant idle for 67 days. In 1949, an underground gas leak led to an explosion that killed 21 people, injured 91, and produced property damage of $1 million. The plant was remodeled and rebuilt between 1950 and 1952. In 1953, the Floyd River flooded, extensively damaging the plant, along with the nearby Cudahy and Armour facilities, the railroad yards, and the stock pens.

Swift closed the facility in 1974, citing a design that did not meet current standards for packing plants. They moved their operations to a location south of the city, leaving much of the plant's equipment in place.

=== KD Stockyards Station ===
In 1975, Sioux City businessman Kermit Lohry bought the building from Swift. He proceeded to convert it into an enclosed shopping mall, using much of the old equipment to decorate the area. The complex opened in 1976 under the name KD Stockyards Station. By the late 1970s, it housed over 60 businesses.

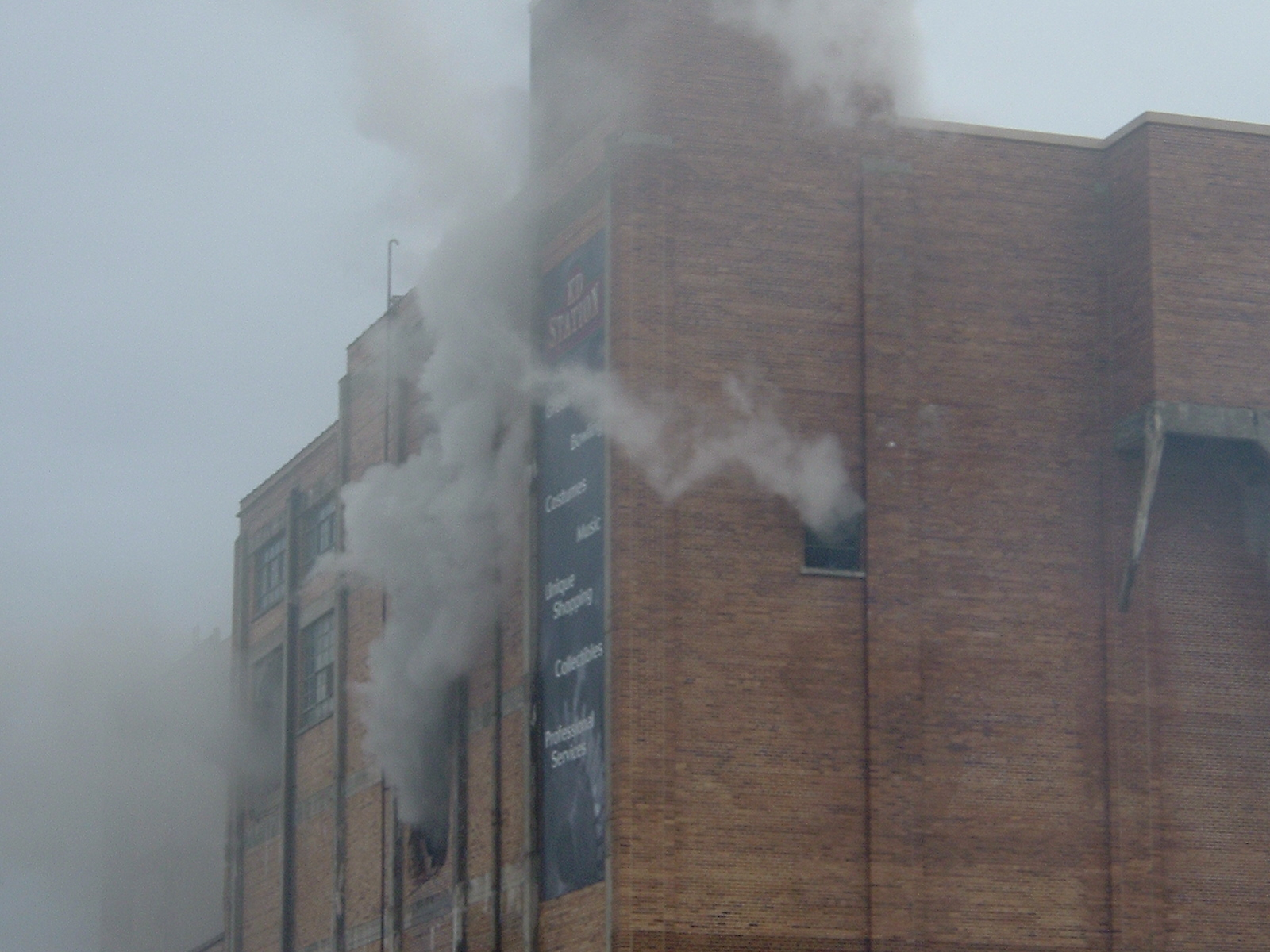
2006 fire

In 1979, the building was listed in the National Register of Historic Places, as the only major meat-packing plant remaining in Sioux City from the early 20th century.

KD Station weathered a certain amount of adversity, including the opening of the Southern Hills Mall in 1980 and the general decline of the stockyards area. However, in 2004, a fire that began in an outdoor electrical transformer caused extensive damage to the building; at about the same time, a major leak developed in the roof. The owners declared themselves unable to maintain the building, and the city declared it unsafe and unfit for occupancy, forcing the nearly 20 businesses to relocate. In 2006, teenaged arsonists used gasoline to start a fire on the fourth floor, further damaging the building.

In 2007, the city took ownership of the building. In 2010, it was demolished at a cost of over $3 million. The city put the vacated 5.5-acre (2.2 ha) parcel up for sale, marketing it for commercial use or light manufacturing. As of 2014, the site remained vacant.

== Packing plant ==
The plant's footprint measured about 330 by 240 feet (100 by 75 m). The building was about 90 feet (25 m) high. The main portion consisted of six stories above a basement; five-story sections lay to the south and the northeast. The exterior walls consisted of concrete, insulated with cork and faced with brick; to provide insulation and keep meat cool, portions of these walls were up to 30 inches (75 cm) thick.

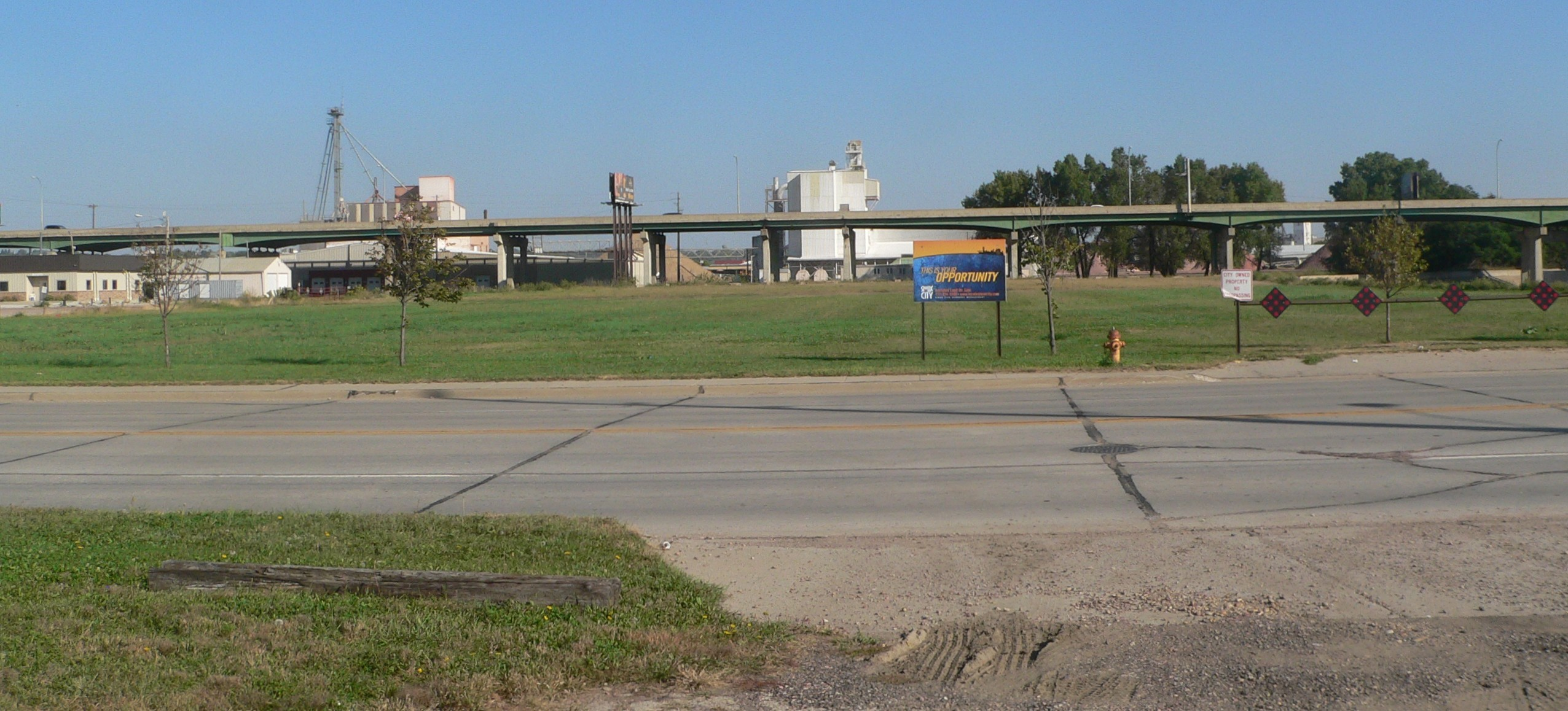
Site in 2015

Processing moved downward in the plant. Cattle and hogs were killed on the fifth floor and stored in coolers on the fifth and sixth floors. Hog carcasses were brought down to the fourth floor for cutting, then subjected to more specialized processes on lower floors. Cattle carcasses were processed on the first floor. Both pork and beef were shipped out via a loading dock at the east end of the building.
