= Burlington Refrigerator Express =

Burlington Refrigerator Express (BREX) was a railroad refrigerator car leasing company that was formed on May 1, 1926 as a joint venture between the Chicago, Burlington and Quincy Railroad (CB&Q) and the Fruit Growers Express Company. The move helped the FGE expand its business into the Pacific Northwest, and added almost 2,700 ice bunker units to the existing car pool already under lease by the Burlington to the FGE and Western Fruit Express (WFE).

Burlington Refrigerator Express Roster, 1930–1970:

1930	1940	1950	1960	1970
2,448	2,025	1,895	1,581	1,987

Source: The Great Yellow Fleet, p. 16.
