= Fruit Growers Express =

American refrigerator car line

Fruit Grower's Express
- Company type: Subsidiary
- Industry: Transportation
- Founded: 1920; 106 years ago
- Headquarters: Jacksonville, Florida, U.S.
- Area served: Eastern United States
- Services: Freight Car Repair
- Parent: CSX Corporation
- Website: csx.com

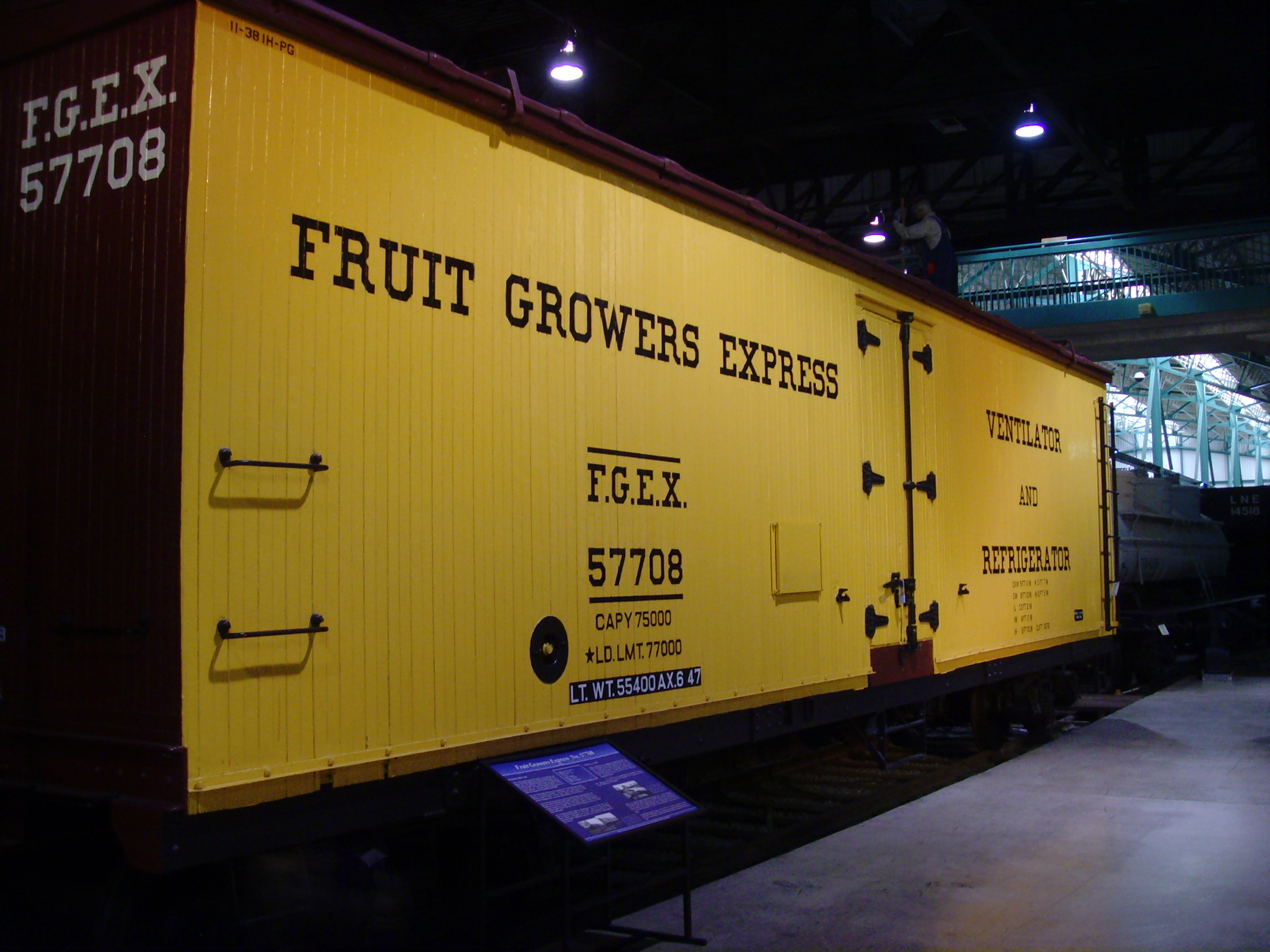
Wooden FGE reefer car at the Railroad Museum of Pennsylvania.

Fruit Growers Express (FGE) was a railroad refrigerator car leasing company that began as a produce-hauling subsidiary of Armour and Company's private refrigerator car line. Armour controlled both the packing operations and the transport insulated railroad car line, and its customers had complained they were overcharged. In 1919 the Federal Trade Commission ordered the company's spinoff of Fruit Growers Express for antitrust reasons, which was accomplished by 1920.

Fruit Growers Express received ownership of 4,280 railroad cars, rolling stock repair operations in Alexandria, Virginia and Jacksonville, Florida, and a number of ice houses and railcar servicing facilities on the east coast of the United States, which it served. Fruit Growers Express was owned by a consortium of major railroads, in which the Chicago and Eastern Illinois, Norfolk & Western, and the New York, New Haven and Hartford Railroad (known simply as the New Haven) were major stockholders. The Richmond, Fredericksburg and Potomac Railroad also held a small (4.5%) ownership position, but sold out by 1982. Other railroads with an interest in FGE were the Atlantic Coast Line, Baltimore & Ohio, Pennsylvania Railroad, Chesapeake & Ohio and the Southern Railway. Hauling produce and servicing it along the route of railroad lines was a very specialized and exacting business segment. Having Fruit Growers Express as a nominally independent company, owned by a consortium of railroads and focused on specific operation and construction of iced and insulated boxcars, freed the major railroads from each bearing the heavy capital costs associated with refrigerated produce operations and the seasonal surges that accompanied it.

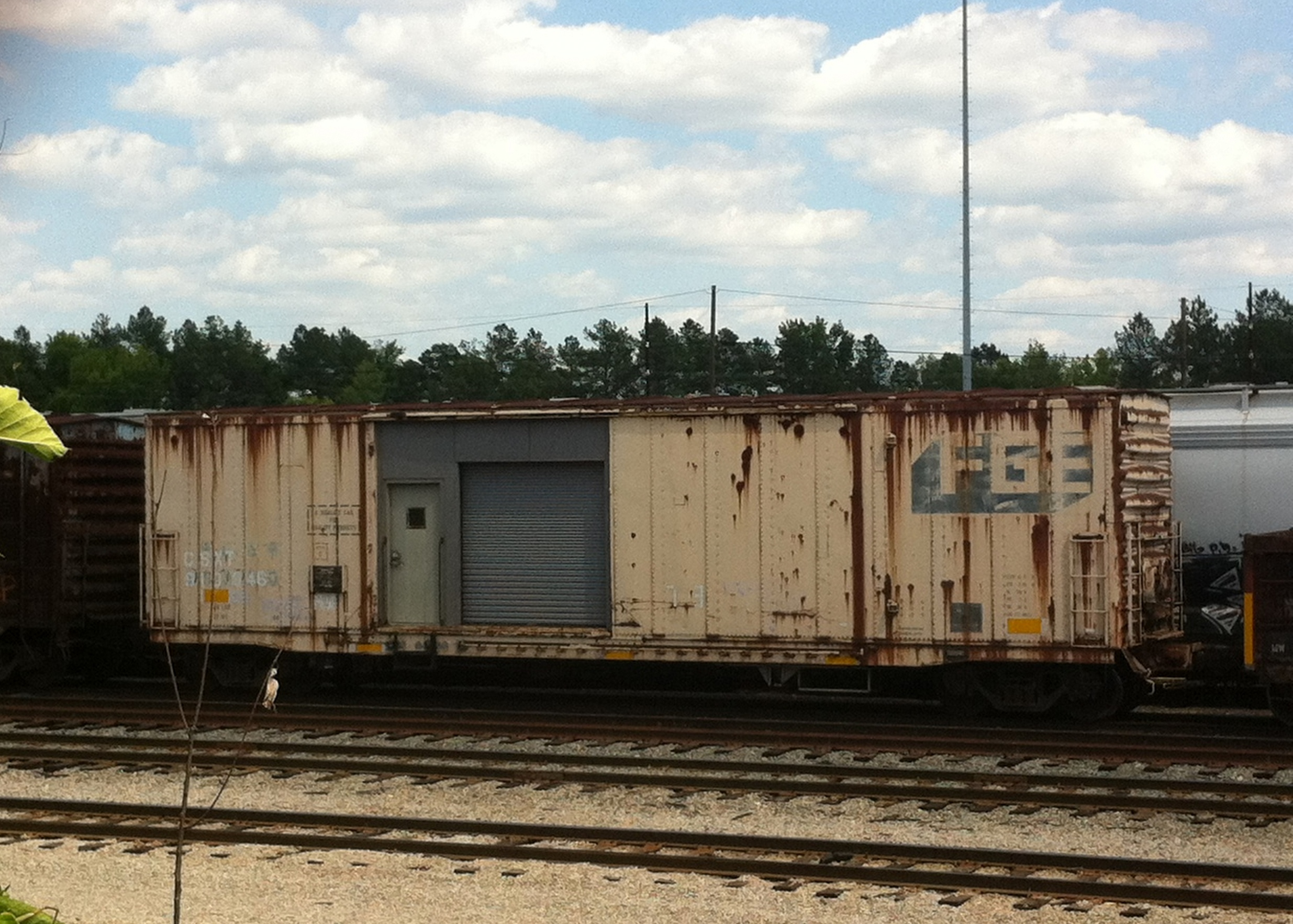
FGE car showing CSXT marking to the left.

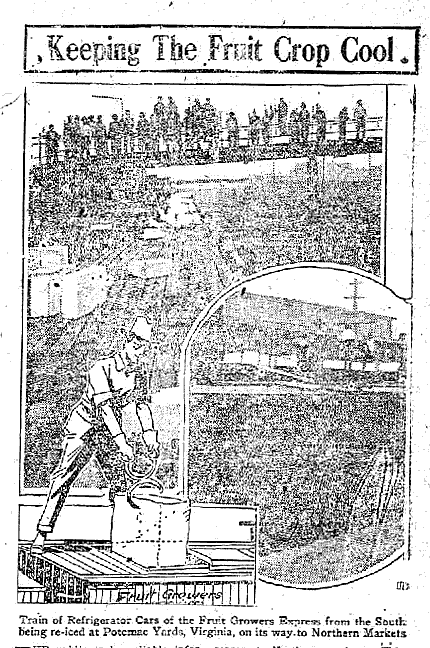
Loading ice into FGE cars for shipping north.

In order to compete with the Pacific Fruit Express and Santa Fe Refrigerator Despatch and to bring southeastern produce to the western markets, FGE and the Great Northern Railway formed the Western Fruit Express (WFE) on July 18, 1923, a move that added 3,000 cars to the equipment pool. By 1926, FGE had expanded its service into the Pacific Northwest and the Midwest through the WFE and the Burlington Refrigerator Express (BREX), its other partly owned subsidiary (formed in partnership with the Chicago, Burlington and Quincy Railroad (CB&Q) on May 1). That same year, FGE purchased 2,676 36-foot-long (11 m) reefers from the Pennsylvania Railroad.

In addition to refrigerated railcar leasing and servicing, FGE also built its own freight cars. In February 1928 FGE formed the National Car Company, a railcar manufacturing unit as a subsidiary to its refrigerated food transport business. Customers included Kahns, Oscar Mayer, and Rath Packing. FGE became a major producer of railroad freight cars, mostly insulated or refrigerated boxcars, although they eventually built other railcars as well. FGE's main railcar production, in keeping with its focus, was refrigerated cars, originally ice-cooled boxcars and insulated (but not cooled) boxcars, and then mechanical refrigerated cars, or "reefers", as technology developed. FGE insulated boxcars, built with wood rather than steel for its better insulating qualities, became popular in the 1960s and 1970s. FGE insulated boxcars were used to transport items that needed protection from heat or freezing but not necessarily separate cooling such as that provided by refrigerated railcars. FGE built railcars and then leased them to the group of railroads that owned FGE. Fruit Growers Express also produced and maintained its own fleet of railcars for independent leasing. In the 1970s, when trucking started to bite into the market of insulated boxcars moving produce, FGE branched into other types of railcar production, notably the production of bay window cabooses and intermodal equipment for FGE's own use and that of its parent railroads. By the mid-1980s, when safety laws were relaxed and automated technology introduced, the caboose ultimately became obsolete, eliminating this production segment for FGE. With increased competition from trucks hauling produce on highways, and the consolidation of the railroad industry in the 1980s spurred by the Staggers Rail Act in 1980, Fruit Growers Express, as a consortium, found that its markets shrank. With the mergers that formed the Norfolk Southern Railway in 1982 and CSX Transportation in 1986, and the subsequent acquisition of both companies, a duopoly of major railroads with vast resources and routes was effectively created on the east coast and midwest, eroding further need for FGE as an independent entity. The company is now a paper entity controlled by CSX Corporation, the successor railroad to the majority of Fruit Growers Express final ownership.

Fruit Growers Express Roster, 1920–1980:
1920	1930	1940	1950	1960	1970	1980
4,280	8,025	14,114	12,063	12,446	8,384	3,182

Fruit Growers Express was headquartered in Washington, DC, with major railcar shops in Alexandria, Virginia, Jacksonville, Florida and Indiana Harbor, Indiana. The Alexandria FGE facility was originally located at the Richmond, Fredericksburg & Potomac Railroad's busy Potomac Yards. In 1925 they relocated to the nearby Cameron Yards, the Southern Railway's switching yard in Alexandria. At its peak, FGE's Alexandria facility could produce 1,000 railcars per year. The Alexandria railcar facility had stopped building freight cars and cabooses by 1981, and the maintenance facility was closed down in 1994. The structure there now serves as the headquarters for Alexandria's DASH bus service.
