= Plumrose USA =

American meat company

Plumrose USA, Inc. produces sliced meats, deli hams, and bacon in the United States. The company offers its products to food distributors, retailers, warehouse stores, institutions, and restaurants. What started out as a sliced ham company in 1932, has expanded into a business that offers a multitude of product lines including premium bacons, packaged deli meats, quality deli counter hams, cooked ribs and canned hams.

== Background ==
The company was founded in 1932 and is headquartered in Chicago, Illinois, with production facilities in Booneville, Mississippi, Elkhart, Indiana, Swanton, Vermont and two facilities in Council Bluffs, Iowa; distribution facilities in Tupelo, Mississippi and South Bend, Indiana and offices in East Brunswick, New Jersey and Rogers, Arkansas. Plumrose USA, Inc. operated as a subsidiary of Danish Crown Group. until May 1, 2017.

In March 2017, Brazil's JBS agreed to acquire the company for $230 million subject to regulatory approval. The deal closed on May 1, 2017.
