= Railex =

Defunct refrigerated rail service

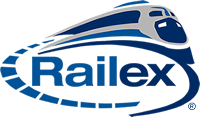

Railex was a refrigerated rail service and third-party logistics provider that transported fruits, vegetables and other temperature sensitive cargo across the United States, in partnership with CSX and Union Pacific. In 2006, Railex launched service between Wallula, Washington, and Rotterdam, New York, followed in 2008 by a Delano, California to NY lane. Railex ran unit trains of 55 large, "plate F" refrigerated cars and promised regularly scheduled departures and arrivals on a five-day service schedule. It claimed reduced carbon emissions when compared to conventional trucking.

In June 2014, Railex opened a new facility in Jacksonville, Florida, with service from the west coast. In 2017, Union Pacific acquired Railex's cold storage facilities and terminals at Delano, California, Wallula, Washington, and Rotterdam, New York (but not its wine unit, Railex Wine Services LLC, now known as Northwest Wine Services). In May 2020, Union Pacific discontinued both services. Railex's system was based on palletized cargo, which was loaded and unloaded indoors in temperature controlled docks that preserved a cold chain for the cargo. It also provided warehousing and could handle less-than-truckload shipments.

== Competition ==
Two additional refrigerated train services were announced in 2013, the Green Express, from Tampa, Florida to Kingsbury, Indiana, operated by CSX and the Tampa Port Authority, and the TransCold Express operated by McKay Transcold and BNSF, connecting the California Central Valley with the midwest.

== See also ==
- SmartWay
