= Santa Fe Refrigerator Despatch =

Refrigerator car line

An ice-cooled reefer of the Santa Fe Refrigerator Despatch "Bulk Fruit Express" c. 1894. There is disagreement among historians as to the color of these cars: white, ivory, light gray, or canary yellow.

The Santa Fe Refrigerator Despatch (reporting mark SFRD) was a railroad refrigerator car line established as a subsidiary of the Atchison, Topeka and Santa Fe Railway in 1884 to carry perishable commodities. Though the line started out with a mere 25 ventilated fruit cars and 8 ice-cooled refrigerator cars, by 1910 its roster had swollen to 6,055 total units (compared to the 8,100 units its largest competitor, the Pacific Fruit Express, operated).

In 1929, the line carried approximately 43 percent of California's citrus crop, most of which travelled aboard its "Green Fruit Express" refrigerator car special. Approximately 100,000 produce loads were shipped from the fields of Arizona and California to East Coast markets each growing season.

Santa Fe Refrigerator Despatch Roster, 1890–1970:

| 1890 | 1900 | 1910 | 1920 | 1930 | 1940 | 1950 | 1960 | 1970 |
| 496 | 1,032 | 6,055 | 9,899 | 18,291 | 14,514 | 14,514 | 13,512 | 10,288 |

Source: The Great Yellow Fleet, p. 17.
