= Pacific Fruit Express =

Railroad refrigerator car leasing company

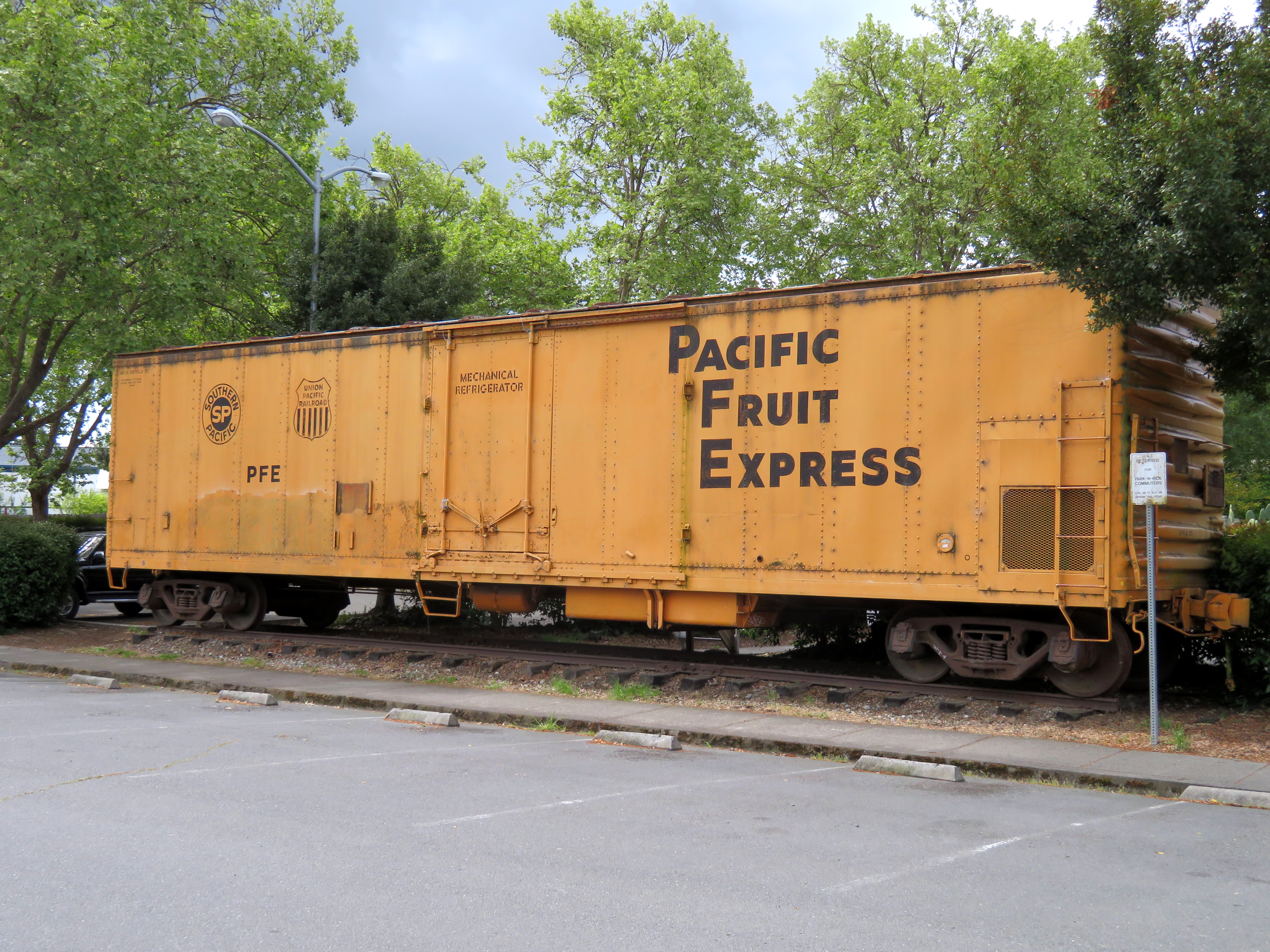
A former Pacific Fruit Express refrigerator car on display in Sebastopol, California

Pacific Fruit Express (reporting mark PFE) was an American railroad refrigerator car leasing company headquartered in San Francisco. At one point, it was the largest refrigerator car operator in the world.

== History ==
=== Founding and early history ===
The company was founded on December 7, 1906 by E. H. Harriman, as a joint venture between the Union Pacific and Southern Pacific railroads. It began operation on October 1, 1907, with a fleet of 6,600 refrigerator cars built by the American Car and Foundry Company (ACF). In the period between 1901 and 1913, the Pacific Fruit Express was the largest refrigerator car company and transported perishable fruit and vegetables which allowed for the increased production of produce in California. In 1913, executives from the PFE met with fruit growers in Lodi, California, to discuss improvements to communications and loading operations to improve service to growers. PFE executives also promised an additional 3,000 cars to avoid car shortages in previous years. However, conflicts between growers and PFE about the number of available cars continued through the 1920s The refrigeration cars initially used natural ice including from the Rocky Mountains and as late as the 1940s they were still harvesting ice from the Rockies to use for refrigeration. One account describes the use of pond ice from Oregon from the early 1900s to 1912 when a refrigeration plant was built.

Number of Refrigerator Cars in Pacific Fruit Express, 1907–1970
1907	1910	1920	1930	1940	1950	1960	1970
6,600	8,100	16,000	40,509	36,899	38,840	28,818	17,648

=== 1920s – 1950s ===
In 1923, the Western Pacific Railroad joined the venture by leasing its own new fleet of 2775 refrigerator cars to PFE. They were painted in standard PFE colors with only WP heralds on the cars instead of the paired Union Pacific–Southern Pacific markings. The Western Pacific cars were all retired by the late 1950s, among the last wooden refrigerator cars in PFE's fleet. WP ended its partnership with PFE in late 1967 and joined Fruit Growers Express instead. The PFE owned its own repair shops and produced its own ice for refrigeration. As of 1948, it owned and operated 18 ice production plants, supplying two million pounds of ice. Competition from highway refrigerated transportation increased during this period, and the fleet decreased to 21,500 cars.

=== 1970s to present ===
Increasing competition from highway refrigeration led to decreasing profits and in March 1978, the company went out of business. PFE's assets were divided equally between the Union Pacific and Southern Pacific when the company was split on April 1, 1978. At the time of the closing, the Southern Pacific maintained the name PFE and the new Union Pacific firm was named the Union Pacific Fruit Express. It is now a Union Pacific subsidiary.

In 1970 a large fire destroyed the ice house owned and operated by the PFR in Tucson, Arizona.

On September 1, 2022 Union Pacific closed the final Fruit Express shop in North Platte, Nebraska at Bailey Yard and all personnel and equipment were transferred to the North Platte Service Unit Car Department.

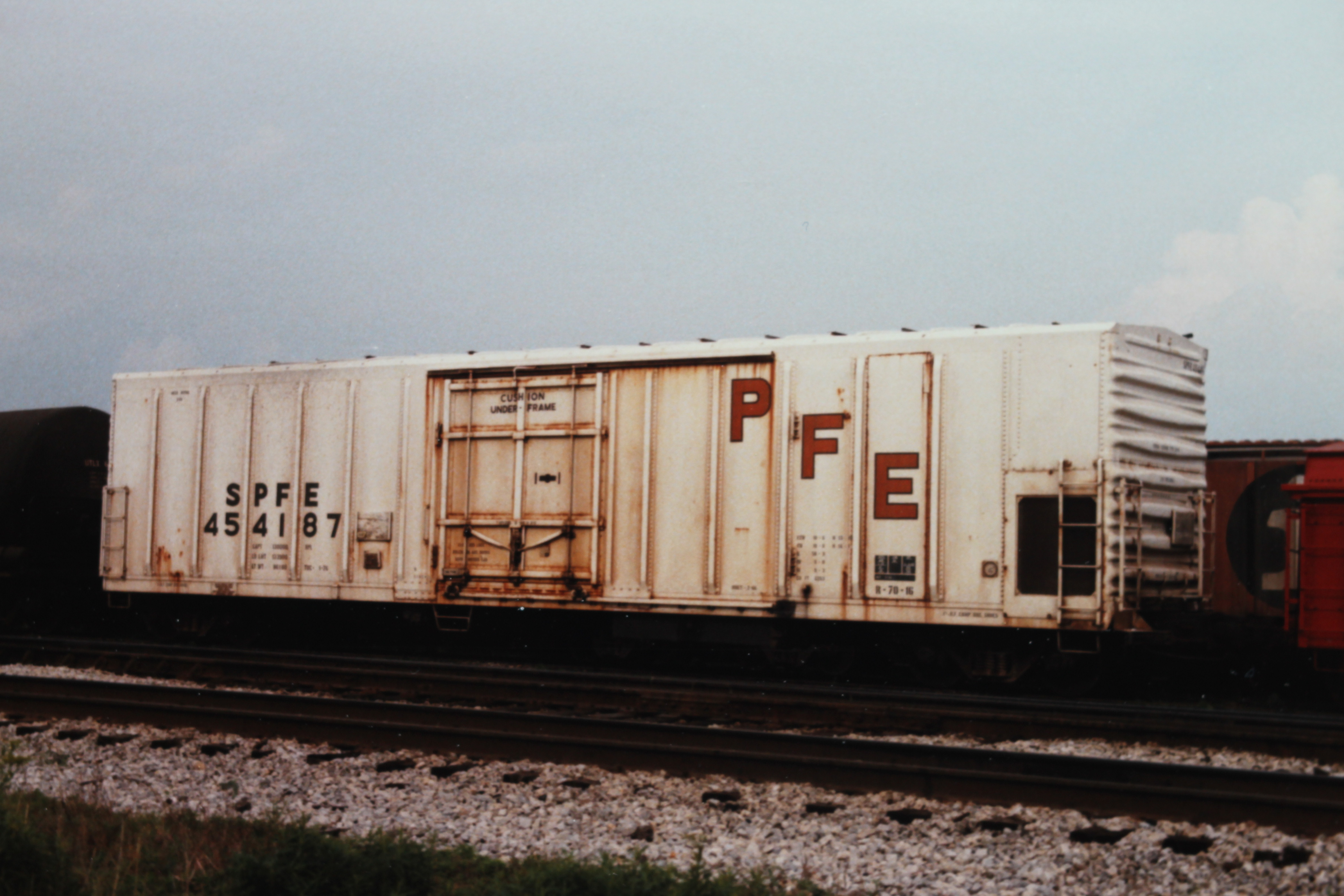
Pacific Fruit Express Boxcar 1987

== Paint and markings ==
Modern cars owned by PFE typically carried both UP and SP heralds and either "Union Pacific Fruit Express" or "Southern Pacific Fruit Express". The reporting marks were UPFE for cars operated by Union Pacific or SPFE for cars operated by Southern Pacific.

== Cultural impact ==
PFE's impact is still seen in Roseville, California, site of a major Union Pacific classification yard, where there is a road named "PFE Road". There are a pair of PFE tracks in the Union Pacific Albina Yard in Portland, Oregon and Tucson Yard Tucson, Az. PFE shops in Pocatello, Idaho are still used by the car department. A PFE boxcar is on final display in Cody Park in North Platte, Nebraska behind Centennial 6922.

PFE refrigerator cars are available as model railroad cars in several gauges, including O, HO, N, and Z. Model railcars of the PFE were available as early as 1928. At the Happy Hollow Park & Zoo in San Jose, California there is a rollercoaster ride called the Pacific Fruit Express and the cars are stylized to look like wooden fruit cartons.

An episode of Tracks Ahead featured the Pacific Fruit Express in 2002. A car in someone's backyard would be restored and eventually be on display at the Western Pacific Museum in Plumas County.
