= Indian Lake, New York =

- Town
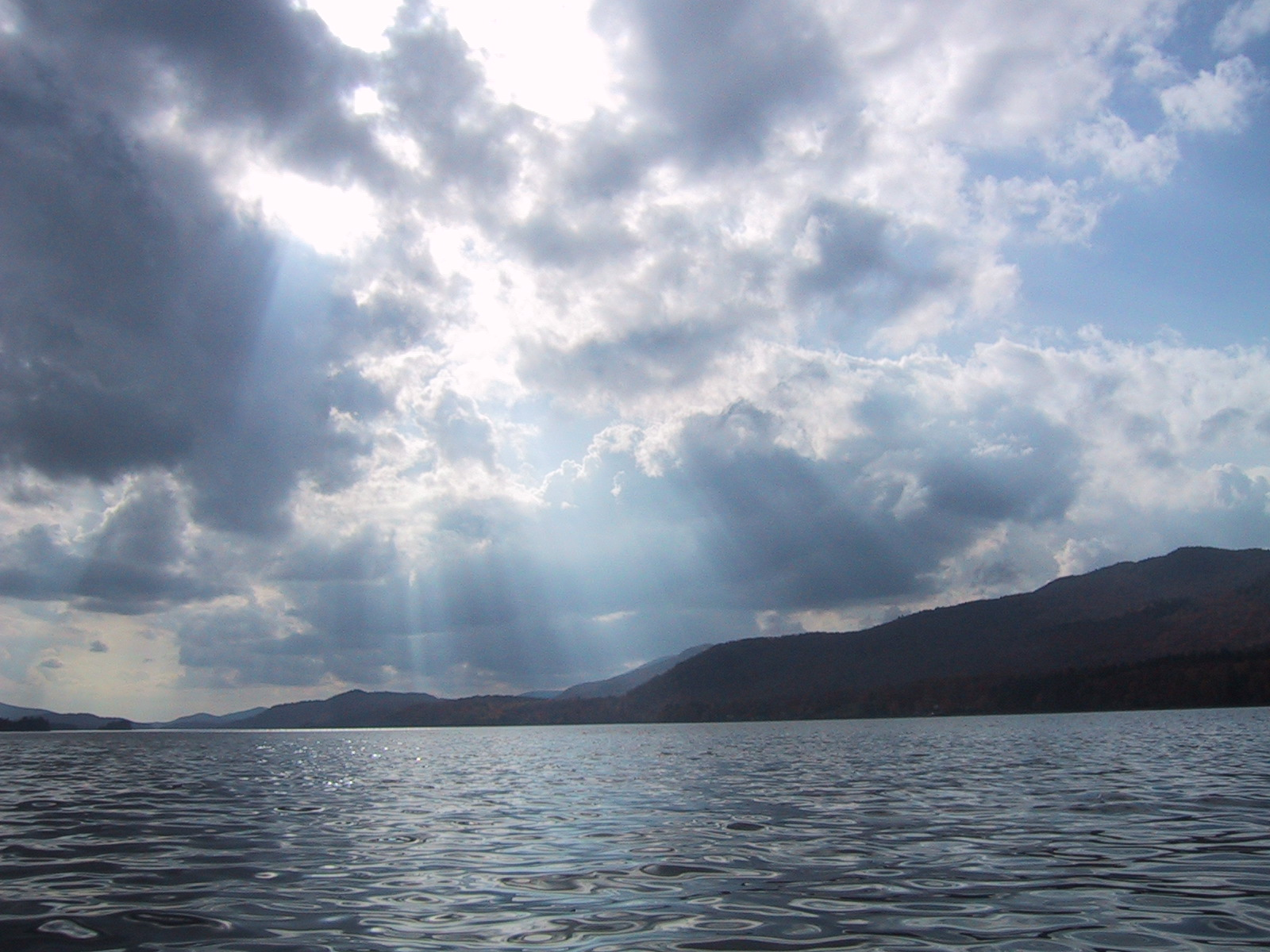
- Indian Lake

- Location in Hamilton County and the state of New York
- Coordinates: 43°46′57″N 74°17′37″W
- Country: United States
- State: New York
- County: Hamilton

Government
  - Type: Town Council
  - Town Supervisor: Brian Wells (R)
  - Town Council: Members' List: • John E. Rathbun (D); • George W. Virgil (R); • Jane E. Locke (D); • Sally C. Stanton (D)

Area
  - Total: 266.24 sq mi (689.56 km^{2})
  - Land: 251.80 sq mi (652.17 km^{2})
  - Water: 14.44 sq mi (37.39 km^{2})
- Elevation: 1,710 ft (520 m)

Population (2010)
  - Total: 1,352
  - Estimate (2016): 1,280
  - Density: 5.4/sq mi (2.07/km^{2})
- Time zone: UTC-5 (Eastern (EST))
  - Summer (DST): UTC-4 (EDT)
- ZIP Codes: 12842 (Indian Lake); 12812 (Blue Mountain Lake); 12864 (Sabael)
- Area code: 518
- FIPS code: 36-041-37374
- GNIS feature ID: 0979092
- Website: indianlakeadk.com

Indian Lake is a town in Hamilton County, New York, United States. The population was 1,352 at the 2010 census. The name is from a lake of the same name that is largely inside the town. There are no permanent stop lights in the town.

The town is on the eastern border of the county and is northeast of Utica.

Indian Lake terms itself the "Moose capital of the Northeast". Their welcoming sign on Route 28 even features this critter, and several other examples of this claim can be found throughout the town itself.

== History ==
The town of Indian Lake was established in 1858 from the towns of Gilman (now defunct), Long Lake, and Wells. In 1861, Indian Lake was expanded using territory from the towns of Gilman and Lake Pleasant.

== Geography ==
According to the United States Census Bureau, the town has a total area of 266.3 square miles (689.6 km^{2}), of which 251.8 square miles (652.2 km^{2}) of the town are land, and 14.4 square miles (37.4 km^{2}), or 5.42%, are water.

The town lies within the Adirondack Park. Essex and Warren counties border the town to its east. In the village center, the east–west State Route 28 meets the north–south Route 30. The Hudson River forms part of the eastern town line.

Land within the town is a mixture of state and private ownership. There are dozens of seasonal hunting camps.

=== Rainbow Lake Dam ===
Rainbow Lake dam was built in 1929. Safety inspectors had described the dam as dangerous as early as 1970, and the United States Army Corps of Engineers categorized the dam as "unsafe, emergency" in 1979. The New York State Department of Environmental Conservation called for the dam's removal in 2004 due to the potential to cause loss of life should the dam fail. The dam owners, connected to a New York City real estate developer and a religious non-profit organization in Brooklyn, ignored an order from the DEC commissioner that required submitting an emergency action plan, and skipped a judicial hearing, in 2013. The DEC lawyers subsequently referred the case to the state attorney general. The dam owners missed three other deadlines between 2015 and 2016; the state sued in December 2018 on grounds that the owners' unresponsiveness "amounts to a callous and wanton disregard for their legal duty to mitigate risk to life and property".

The Rainbow Lake Dam, near the hamlet of Indian Lake, New York, was removed in May 2023.

== Climate ==
Indian Lake has a humid continental climate (Dfb), although it is much colder than most of New York due to its high elevation and northern location. Winters are cold and snowy, while summers are warm and humid. Precipitation is abundant year round, but peaks in summer. The coldest month is January, with a mean temperature of 15.4, while the warmest month is July with a mean of 63.8. Just 0.1 day per year exceeds 90, with the last such instance coming in 1988. Days in the 80s are also relatively uncommon, with an average of just 18 per year. The record high is 105 in June 1919, but the temperature has not exceeded 95 since 1935. The record low is -42 in January 1908. The coldest temperature in a typical year is -22, putting Indian Lake in hardiness zone 4B. The record low high is -12 in 1968, while the record high low in a day is 74 in 2006.

The wettest year on record was 2011 with 60.80", while the driest year ever was 1963 with 27.42". The wettest month ever was June 1922 with 10.31" while the driest month was November 1989, with no recorded precipitation.

Climate data for Indian Lake 2SW, NY, 1991–2020 normals, extremes 1899-2020: 1670ft (509m)
Month	Jan	Feb	Mar	Apr	May	Jun	Jul	Aug	Sep	Oct	Nov	Dec	Year
Record high °F (°C)	62 (17)	68 (20)	81 (27)	86 (30)	97 (36)	105 (41)	103 (39)	100 (38)	93 (34)	87 (31)	75 (24)	68 (20)	105 (41)
Mean maximum °F (°C)	47 (8)	47 (8)	56 (13)	71 (22)	81 (27)	84 (29)	84 (29)	83 (28)	80 (27)	72 (22)	61 (16)	50 (10)	86 (30)
Mean daily maximum °F (°C)	25.4 (−3.7)	27.9 (−2.3)	36.2 (2.3)	49.2 (9.6)	62.9 (17.2)	70.6 (21.4)	74.6 (23.7)	73.3 (22.9)	66.7 (19.3)	54.0 (12.2)	41.3 (5.2)	30.6 (−0.8)	51.1 (10.6)
Daily mean °F (°C)	15.6 (−9.1)	17.3 (−8.2)	25.6 (−3.6)	38.6 (3.7)	51.3 (10.7)	59.9 (15.5)	64.3 (17.9)	63.0 (17.2)	56.1 (13.4)	44.4 (6.9)	33.3 (0.7)	22.4 (−5.3)	41.0 (5.0)
Mean daily minimum °F (°C)	5.8 (−14.6)	6.7 (−14.1)	15.1 (−9.4)	28.0 (−2.2)	39.6 (4.2)	49.3 (9.6)	53.9 (12.2)	52.6 (11.4)	45.4 (7.4)	34.8 (1.6)	25.2 (−3.8)	14.1 (−9.9)	30.9 (−0.6)
Mean minimum °F (°C)	−19 (−28)	−15 (−26)	−9 (−23)	14 (−10)	26 (−3)	35 (2)	42 (6)	40 (4)	31 (−1)	22 (−6)	7 (−14)	−9 (−23)	−22 (−30)
Record low °F (°C)	−40 (−40)	−42 (−41)	−30 (−34)	−9 (−23)	12 (−11)	21 (−6)	28 (−2)	20 (−7)	18 (−8)	2 (−17)	−17 (−27)	−41 (−41)	−42 (−41)
Average precipitation inches (mm)	3.03 (77)	2.52 (64)	3.16 (80)	3.70 (94)	3.93 (100)	4.41 (112)	3.96 (101)	3.99 (101)	3.46 (88)	4.51 (115)	3.47 (88)	3.41 (87)	43.55 (1,107)
Average snowfall inches (cm)	23.40 (59.4)	22.80 (57.9)	18.00 (45.7)	4.50 (11.4)	0.30 (0.76)	0.00 (0.00)	0.00 (0.00)	0.00 (0.00)	0.00 (0.00)	1.10 (2.8)	8.20 (20.8)	23.20 (58.9)	101.5 (257.66)
Source 1: NOAA
Source 2: XMACIS (records & 1991-2020 monthly max/mins)

== Demographics ==
Historical population
Census	Pop.	Note	%±
1860	256		—
1870	202		−21.1%
1880	615		204.5%
1890	1,047		70.2%
1900	1,219		16.4%
1910	1,045		−14.3%
1920	1,031		−1.3%
1930	1,120		8.6%
1940	1,257		12.2%
1950	1,099		−12.6%
1960	1,186		7.9%
1970	1,290		8.8%
1980	1,410		9.3%
1990	1,481		5.0%
2000	1,471		−0.7%
2010	1,352		−8.1%
2016 (est.)	1,280		−5.3%
U.S. Decennial Census

According to the census of 2000, there were 1,471 people, 651 households, and 425 families residing in the town. The population density was 5.8 inhabitants per square mile (2.2/km^{2}). There were 1,722 housing units, with an average density of 6.8 per square mile (2.6/km^{2}). The racial makeup of the town was 97.96% White, 0.34% African American, 0.14% Native American, 0.07% Asian, 0.75% from other races, and 0.75% multi-racial. Hispanic or Latino of any race were 1.22% of the population.

Within the town's 651 households, 22.9% had children under the age of 18 living with them, 55.8% were married couples living together, 6.1% had a female head of household, and 34.7% were non-families. 31.0% of all households were made up of individuals, and 14.4% had someone living alone and 65 years of age or older. The average household size was 2.22 and the average family size was 2.77.

In the town, the population under the age of 18 was 20.0%, with 4.7% from 18 to 24, 24.3% from 25 to 44, 30.0% from 45 to 64, and 21.1% were 65 years of age or older. The median age was 46 years. For every 100 females, there were 94.8 males. For every 100 females age 18 and over, there were 95.2 males.

The median income for a household in the town was $32,328, and the median income for a family was $39,438. The median income for males was $29,375 as compared to $23,661 for females. The per capita income for the town was $17,940. A lot of people in the town commute south for work, as the Town of Indian Lake itself has very little industry. About 4.4% of families and 8.5% of the population were below the poverty line, including 6.1% of those under age 18 and 9.9% of those age 65 or over.

== Other information ==
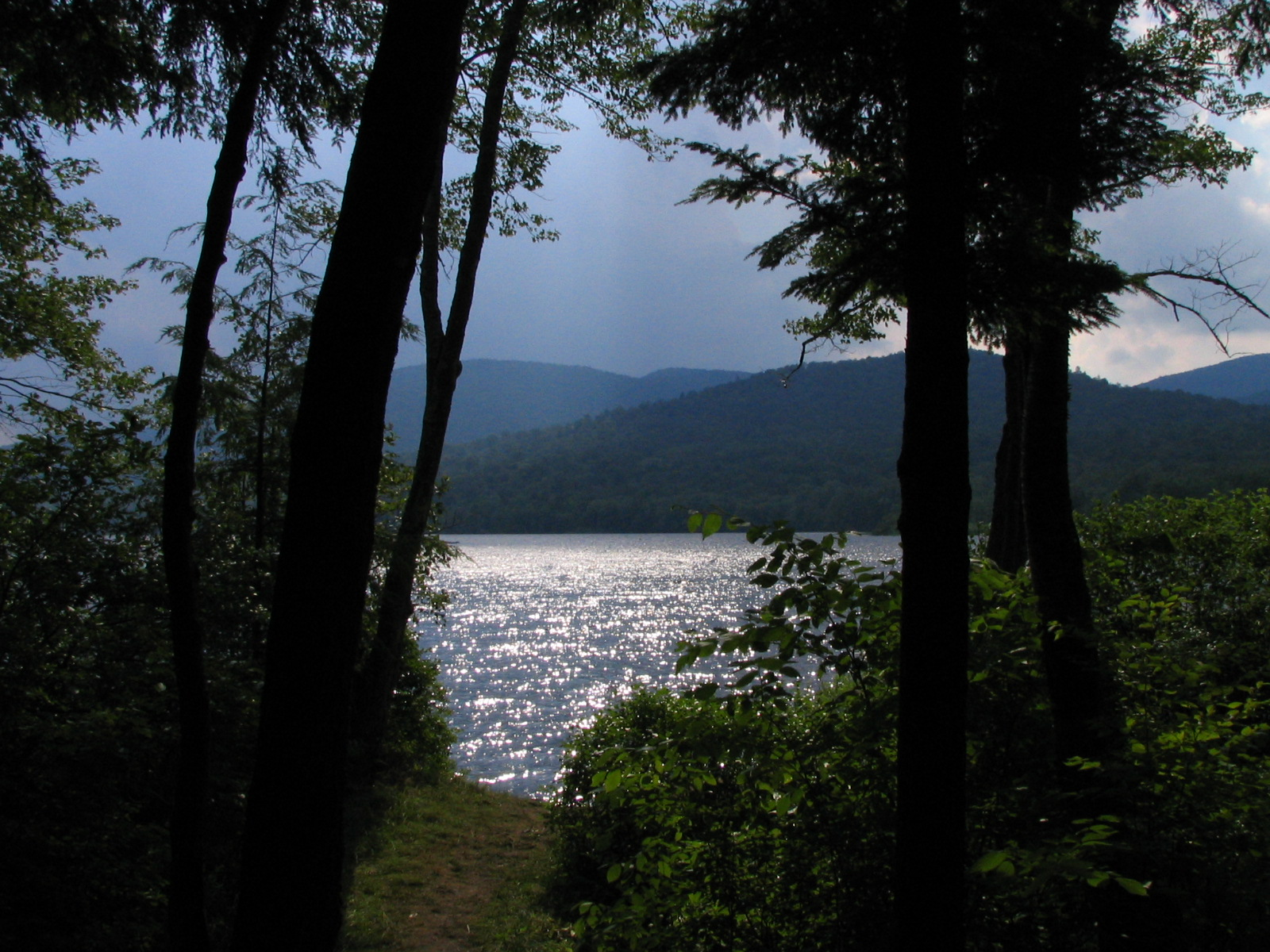
View from a campsite at Lewey Lake (near Indian Lake)

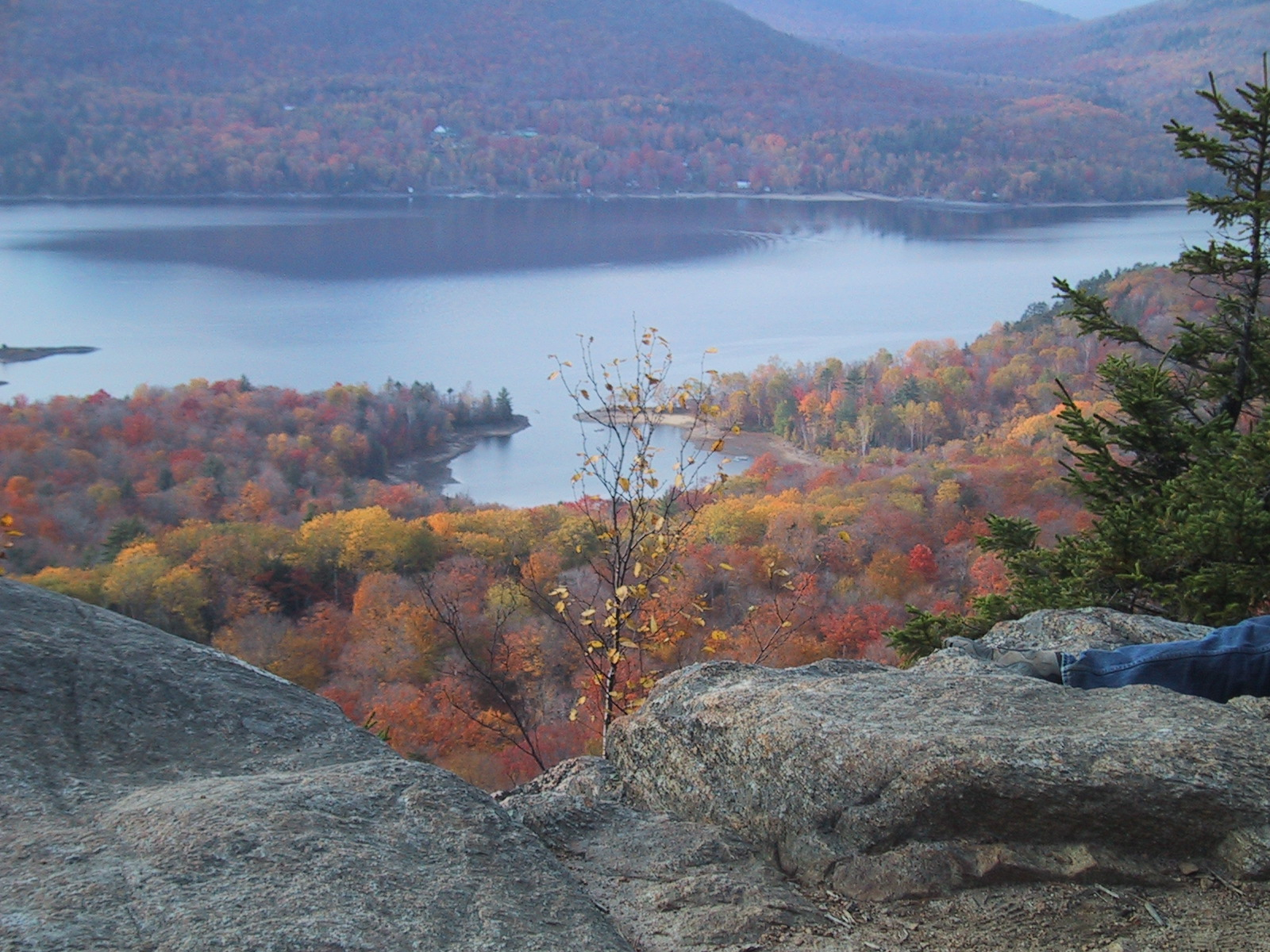
A view of one of the many coves on Indian Lake

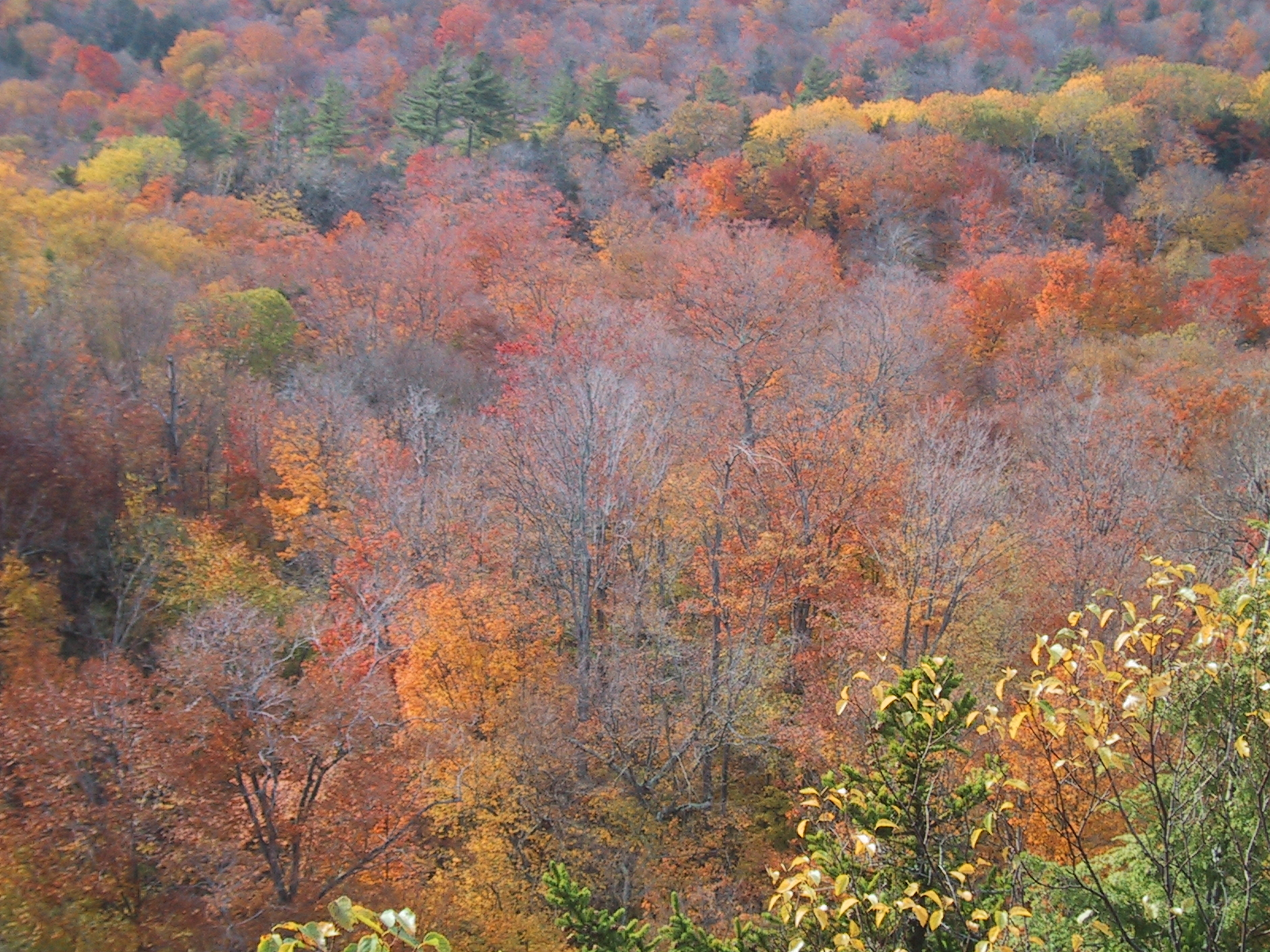
Fall foliage at Indian Lake

The Indian Lake Museum in the hamlet of Indian Lake contains displays relating to the historic Indian population. The Adirondack Museum in Blue Mountain Lake has displays of outdoor living in the region. The Adirondack Lakes Center for the Arts in Blue Mountain Lake provides cultural events during the summer season. The Indian Lake Library provides books, DVDs, audios and access to the Internet.

The lake itself was the inspiration for the 1960s hit single "Indian Lake" by the Cowsills. (The writer Tony Romeo spent vacations there at what used to be Beeches Cottages on Indian Lake.)

Once called the "Whitewater Capital of New York State", Indian Lake remains a haven. State record game has been taken from the forests surrounding Indian Lake.

== Communities and locations in Indian Lake ==
- Adirondack Lake – A lake located north of the hamlet of Indian Lake.
- Bad Luck Mountain – An elevation located east-northeast of the hamlet of Indian Lake.
- Baldface Mountain – An elevation located south of the hamlet of Indian Lake.
- Beaver Mountain – An elevation located south-southwest of the hamlet of Indian Lake.
- Bell Mountain – An elevation located east of the hamlet of Indian Lake.
- Big Bad Luck Pond – A lake located east of the hamlet of Indian Lake.
- Black Mountain – An elevation located east of the hamlet of Indian Lake.
- Blue Mountain – A mountain located east of the hamlet of Blue Mountain Lake.
- Blue Mountain Lake – A hamlet near a NY-28 and NY-30 intersection. This hamlet is in the northern part of the town, north of Indian Lake hamlet. The Adirondack Museum is located north of the hamlet.
- Blue Mountain Lake – A lake west of the community of Blue Mountain Lake.
- Buck Mountain – An elevation located north of Blue Mountain.
- Burgess Mountain – An elevation located southwest of the hamlet of Indian Lake.
- Blue Ridge – A mountain range south of Blue Mountain Lake. Partially in the Town of Lake Pleasant.
- Cascade Pond – A pond located south of the hamlet of Blue Mountain Lake.
- Casey Mountain – An elevation located east of the hamlet of Indian Lake.
- Castle Rock – An elevation located north of Blue Mountain Lake.
- Crotched Pond – A lake located south of the hamlet of Indian Lake.
- Crotched Pond Mountain – An elevation located south of the hamlet of Indian Lake.
- Crow Hill – An elevation located south of the hamlet of Indian Lake.
- Davis Mountain – An elevation located east of the hamlet of Indian Lake.
- Dun Brook Mountain – A mountain located east of Blue Mountain.
- Eagle Lake – A lake by the west town line and west of Blue Mountain Lake.
- Eagles Nest – A location west of the hamlet of Blue Mountain Lake.
- Fox Hill – An elevation located east of the hamlet of Indian Lake.
- Gates Hill – An elevation located south-southwest of the hamlet of Indian Lake.
- Harris Rift Mountain – An elevation located north of Starbuck Mountain.
- Hemlock Cobble – An elevation located south-southwest of the hamlet of Indian Lake.
- Indian Lake – A large lake with a southwest to northeast orientation in the town of Indian Lake and the Town of Lake Pleasant.
- Indian Lake – A hamlet of the same name in the Town of Indian Lake at the intersection of NY-28 and NY-30 and near the north end of the lake called Indian Lake.
- Kings Flow – A lake located east of Indian Lake.
- Kunjamuk Mountain – An elevation located south of the hamlet of Indian Lake.
- Lake Abanakee – A lake east of the Indian Lake hamlet.
- Lake Durant – A lake south of Blue Mountain Lake hamlet.
- Lake Snow – small lake located east of the hamlet of Indian Lake
- Ledger Mountain – An elevation located northwest of the hamlet of Indian Lake.
- Little Blue Mountain – An elevation located north of Blue Mountain Lake.
- Little Hardwood Hill – An elevation located south-southwest of Indian Lake.
- Little Mill Mountain – An elevation located north of the hamlet of Indian Lake.
- Long Pond – A lake located south of Crotched Pond. Partially in the town of Wells.
- Long Pond Ridge – An elevation located south of Indian Lake.
- McGinn Hill – An elevation located east of the hamlet of Indian Lake.
- Middle Mountain – An elevation located east of the hamlet of Indian Lake.
- Mill Mountain – An elevation located northwest of the hamlet of Indian Lake.
- Moose Mountain – An elevation located southwest of the hamlet of Indian Lake.
- P Gay Mountain – An elevation located east of the hamlet of Indian Lake.
- Peaked Mountain – An elevation located north of Blue Mountain Lake.
- Pine Lake – A lake located north of the hamlet of Indian Lake. Part of the lake is in the town of Minerva.
- Pine Mountain – An elevation located east-northeast of the hamlet of Indian Lake.
- Porter Hill – An elevation located south-southwest of the hamlet of Indian Lake.
- Rock Lake – A lake halfway between Indian Lake hamlet and Blue Mountain Lake hamlet.
- Round Pond – A lake located east of Crotched Pond.
- Ruby Mountain – An elevation located east-southeast of the hamlet of Indian Lake.
- Sabael – A hamlet on the southwest side of Indian Lake, located on NY-30.
- Sawyer Mountain – An elevation located west-northwest of the hamlet of Indian Lake.
- Sprague Pond – A lake located southeast of Blue Mountain Lake.
- Starbuck Mountain – An elevation located east of the hamlet of Indian Lake.
- Stark Hills – An elevation located northwest of the hamlet of Indian Lake.
- Tirrell Mountain – An elevation located east-northeast of Blue Mountain.
- Tirrel Pond – A lake located east-northeast of Blue Mountain.
- Tongue Mountain – An elevation located northeast of Blue Mountain.
- White Birch Ridge – An elevation located north of the hamlet of Indian Lake.
- Wilderness Lodge – A location east of Indian Lake near the border with Warren County.
- Windfall Hill – An elevation located south-southwest of the hamlet of Indian Lake.
