= Bell Mountain =

Bell Mountain may refer to:

== Mountains ==
- Bell Mountain (Riverside County, California)
- Bell Mountain (San Bernardino County, California)
- Bell Mountain (Georgia), a scenic viewpoint near Hiawassee, Georgia
- Bell Mountain (Idaho)
- Bell Mountain (Missouri)
- Bell Mountain (Nevada)
- Bell Mountain (New York)
- Bell Mountain, original name of Purple Mountain, near Nanjing in Jiangsu Province, China

== Other uses ==
- Bell Mountain, California, a community in San Bernardino County
- Bell Mountain Wilderness, a wilderness area in Missouri
- Bell Mountain AVA, a viticultural area in Gillespie County, Texas
