= Tirrell Mountain =

Mountain in New York, United States

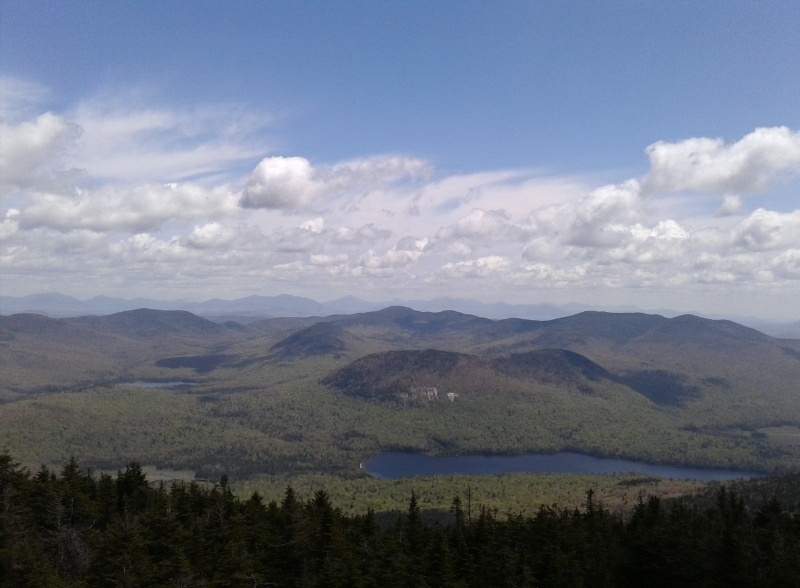
- Tirrel Pond with Tirrell Mountain directly behind, Dun Brook Mountain (top right), and Tongue Mountain (behind Tirrell Mountain).

Highest point
- Elevation: 2,953 feet (900 m)
- Coordinates: 43°53′34″N 74°21′43″W

Geography
- Location within New York Adirondack Park Location within the United States
- Location: ENE of Blue Mountain Lake, New York, U.S.
- Topo map: USGS Dun Brook Mountain

Tirrell Mountain is a mountain located in Adirondack Mountains of New York located in the Town of Indian Lake east-northeast of Blue Mountain Lake. Tirrel Pond is located southeast, Dun Brook Mountain is located east, and Tongue Mountain is located northeast of Tirrell Mountain.
