= Peaked Mountain =

Peaked Mountain may refer to:

- Peaked Mountain (Massachusetts)
  - Peaked Mountain Co-op
- Peaked Mountain (New Hampshire)
- Peaked Mountain (Hamilton County, New York)
- Peaked Mountain (Warren County, New York)

== See also ==
- Peaked Mountain Lake, New York
- Peaked Hill (disambiguation)
