= Round Pond =

Round Pond may refer to:

== Ponds or places ==
in Canada

- Round Pond (Newfoundland), near Bay d'Espoir, Newfoundland and Labrador

in England

- Round Pond (London) in Kensington Gardens

in the United States

- Round Pond (Connecticut)
- Round Pond, a village in the town of Bristol, Maine
- Round Pond (Berlin, New York)
- Round Pond (Indian Lake, Hamilton County, New York)
- Round Pond (Limekiln Lake, New York), in Ohio, New York
- Round Pond (Old Forge, New York)
- Round Pond (Tewksbury, Massachusetts), in Tewksbury, Massachusetts
- Round Pond in Round Pond Recreation Area, near the United States Military Academy in New York State
- Round Pond now called Culver's Lake in Frankford Township, New Jersey

== Other ==
- Round Pond (horse), a thoroughbred racehorse
