= Sawyer Mountain =

Mountain in New York, United States

- Location within New York Adirondack Park Location within the United States

Highest point
- Elevation: 2,589 feet (789 m)
- Coordinates: 43°48′10″N 74°20′07″W

Geography
- Location: WNW of Indian Lake, New York, U.S.
- Topo map: USGS Rock Lake

Sawyer Mountain is a mountain located in Adirondack Mountains of New York located in the Town of Indian Lake west-northwest of Indian Lake.

The Sawyer Mountain Trail is a 2.1 mile, moderate rated, trail located near Blue Mountain Lake. The trailhead located on Rte 28/30 between the hamlets of Indian Lake and Blue Mountain Lake in the Adirondacks. The trail does not summit the true top, which is 0.2 miles further south of the viewing platform.
