= Dun Brook Mountain =

Mountain in New York, United States

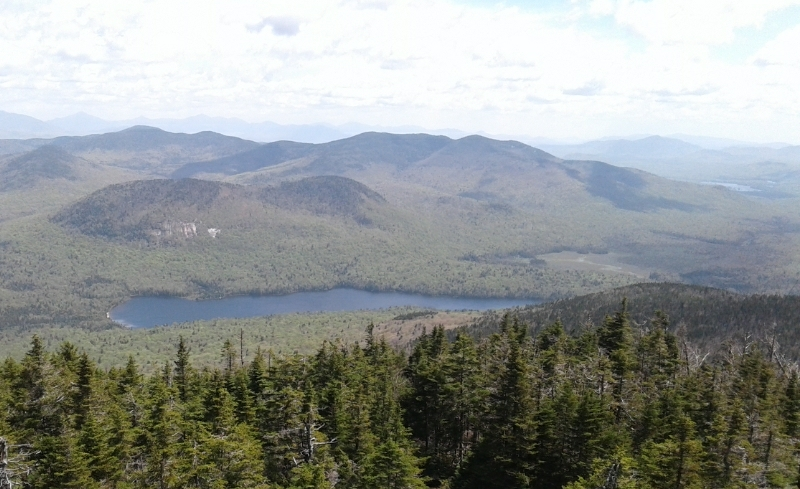
- View of Tirrel Pond with Tirrell Mountain (directly behind) and Dun Brook Mountain (top middle) from Blue Mountain

Highest point
- Elevation: 3,563 feet (1,086 m)
- Listing: Adirondack Hundred Highest
- Coordinates: 43°53′27″N 74°19′08″W

Geography
- Location within New York Adirondack Park Location within the United States
- Location: ENE of Blue Mountain Lake, New York, U.S.
- Topo map: USGS Dun Brook Mountain

Dun Brook Mountain is a mountain located in Adirondack Mountains of New York located in the town of Indian Lake east-northeast of Blue Mountain Lake. Tirrell Mountain is located west and Tirrel Pond is located west-southwest of Dun Brook Mountain.

== History ==
In May 1911, the Conservation Commission erected a wood tower on the mountain. The tower ceased fire watching operations in 1920.
