= Ruby Mountain (New York) =

Mountain in New York, United States

- Location within New York Adirondack Park Location within the United States

Highest point
- Elevation: 2,641 feet (805 m)
- Coordinates: 43°44′49″N 74°06′17″W

Geography
- Location: Indian Lake, Hamilton County, New York, U.S.
- Topo map: USGS Gore Mountain

Ruby Mountain is a mountain located in the Adirondack Mountains of New York, in the town of Indian Lake in Hamilton County, east-southeast of the hamlet of Indian Lake. The mountain has been the location of a garnet mine owned by Barton Mines since 1982.
