= Moose Mountain (Hamilton County, New York) =

Mountain in New York, United States

- Location within New York Adirondack Park Location within the United States

Highest point
- Elevation: 2,333 feet (711 m)
- Coordinates: 43°40′11″N 74°18′57″W

Geography
- Location: SW of Indian Lake, New York, U.S.
- Topo map: USGS Indian Lake

Moose Mountain is a mountain located in Adirondack Mountains of New York located in the Town of Indian Lake southwest of Indian Lake.
