= Forks Mountain =

Forks Mountain may refer to the following mountains:

- Forks Mountain (Essex County, New York)
- Forks Mountain (Lake Pleasant, New York), in Hamilton County, New York
- Forks Mountain (Wells, New York), in Hamilton County, New York
