= Buck Mountain (Indian Lake, New York) =

Mountain in New York, United States

- Location within New York Location within the United States

Highest point
- Elevation: 2,631 feet (802 m)
- Coordinates: 43°53′23″N 74°24′15″W

Geography
- Location: NE of Blue Mountain Lake, New York, U.S.
- Topo map: USGS Deerland

Buck Mountain is a mountain located in Adirondack Mountains of New York located in the Town of Indian Lake northeast of Blue Mountain Lake.
