= Ledger Mountain =

Mountain in New York, United States

- Location within New York Adirondack Park Location within the United States

Highest point
- Elevation: 2,172 feet (662 m)
- Coordinates: 43°48′37″N 74°18′24″W

Geography
- Location: NW of Indian Lake, New York, U.S.
- Topo map: USGS Rock Lake

Ledger Mountain is a mountain located in Adirondack Mountains of New York located in the Town of Indian Lake northwest of Indian Lake.
