= Freshwater acidification =

Acidification of freshwater by rain

Diagram depicting the sources and cycles of acid rain precipitation.

Freshwater acidification occurs when acidic inputs enter a body of fresh water through the weathering of rocks, invasion of acidifying gas (e.g. carbon dioxide), or by the reduction of acid anions, like sulfate and nitrate within a lake, pond, or reservoir. Freshwater acidification is primarily caused by sulfur oxides (SO_{x}) and nitrogen oxides (NO_{x}) entering the water from atmospheric depositions and soil leaching. Carbonic acid and dissolved carbon dioxide can also enter freshwaters, in a similar manner associated with runoff, through carbon dioxide-rich soils. Runoff that contains these compounds may incorporate acidifying hydrogen ions and inorganic aluminum, which can be toxic to marine organisms. Acid rain also contributes to freshwater acidification. A well-documented case of freshwater acidification in the Adirondack Lakes, New York, emerged in the 1970s, driven by acid rain from industrial sulfur dioxide (SO_{2}) and nitrogen oxide (NO_{x}) emissions.

== Causes ==
=== Natural ===
CO_{2} from the atmosphere or the decomposition of organic matter affects freshwater acidity. The CO_{2} dissolves in water to form carbonic acid. This carbonic acid dissociates into hydrogen ions (H^{+}) and bicarbonate (HCO_{3}^{-}), which increases the H+ ions and leads to decrease in pH level.

CO_{2} + H_{2}O → H_{2}CO_{3}; H_{2}CO_{3} ⇌ H^{+} + HCO_{3}^{-}

Microbial activity breaks down of organic matter releases organic acids such as humic and fulvic acids. These acids accumulate in water bodies, especially those surrounded by forests and wetlands. Peatlands and wetlands often produce acidic waters because of the high levels of organic matter decomposition. This creates naturally acidic conditions, which are common in boreal and subarctic regions.

Volcanic activity can release sulfur dioxide (SO_{2}) and other acidic oxides into the atmosphere. In air, sulfur dioxide converts to sulfuric acid: This sulfuric acid dissociates into sulfate ions (SO_{4}^{2-}) and hydrogen ions (H^{+}), increasing the acidic condition.

SO_{2} + 1/2 O_{2} + H_{2}O → H_{2}SO_{4}; H_{2}SO_{4} → 2H^{+} + SO_{4}^{2-}

=== Anthropogenic ===
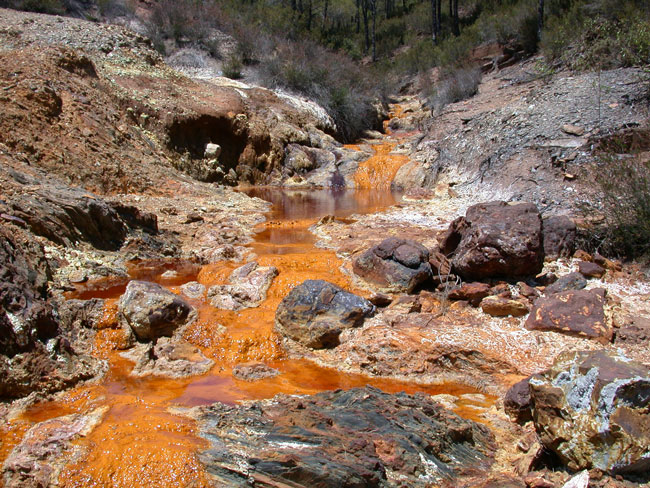
Rio Tinto in Spain presents an acid drainage of both natural and artificial origin (mining)

Human activities can significantly accelerate freshwater acidification. In addition to carbon dioxide, the combustion of fossil fuels sulfur dioxide (SO_{2}) and nitrogen oxides (NO_{x}). These gases react with water and air to form sulfuric acid (H_{2}SO_{4}) and nitric acid (HNO_{3}). Similar to sulfuric acid, nitric acid also decrease the pH level by dissociates into hydrogen ions (H^{+}) and nitrate ions (NO_{3}^{-}).

NO_{x} + H_{2}O + 1/2 O_{2} → HNO_{3}; HNO_{3} → H^{+} + NO_{3}^{-}

This process is particularly harmful in areas where the natural buffering capacity of the water is low, as these ecosystems are less able to neutralize the added acidity.

Mining can significantly contribute to freshwater acidification through the process of acid mine drainage. When sulfide minerals such as pyrite (FeS_{2}) are exposed to air and water during mining operations, they oxidize to form sulfuric acid.

== Buffering Capacity ==
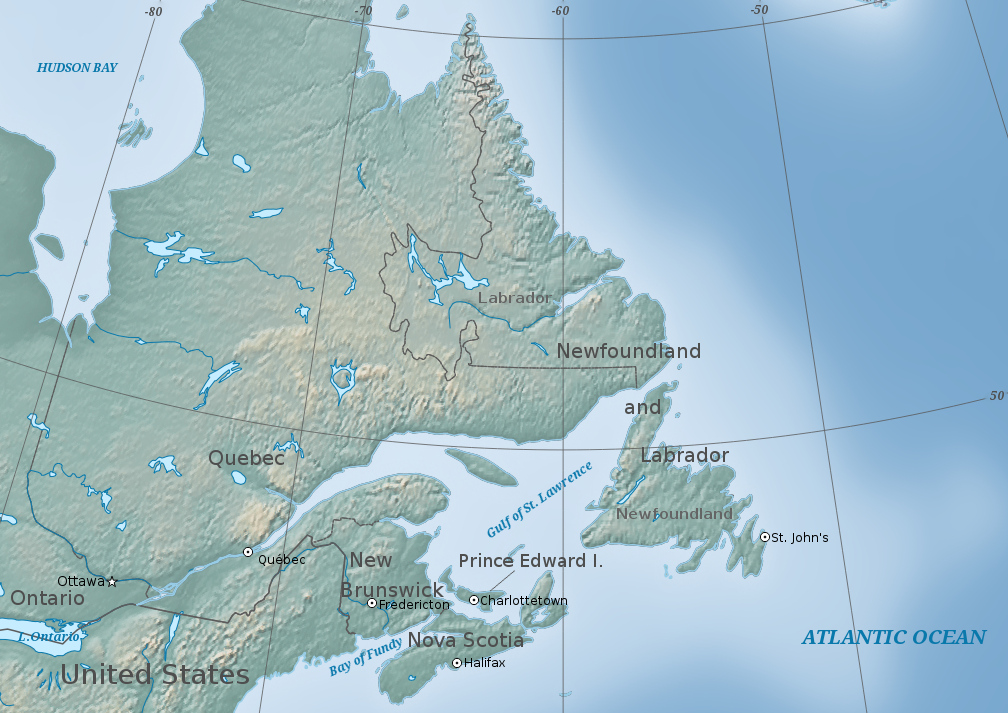
A map depicting Atlantic Canada.

The buffering capacity of ecosystems helps them resist changes in pH. The presence bicarbonate (HCO_{3}^{-}) and carbonate (CO_{3}^{2-}) ions in freshwater systems can neutralize the income hydrogen ions (H^{+}).

HCO_{3}^{-} + H^{+} → CO_{2} + H_{2}O

However, low-alkalinity regions (e.g., with silicate bedrock) lack the natural buffering capacity to neutralize incoming ions, leading to rapid pH drops. For example, the Atlantic region of Canada has the lowest acid deposition rates in Eastern North America, yet it has the most acidic waters on the continent due to the low buffering capacity of the regional bedrock and the addition of natural organic acids produced from close by wetlands. In most of the Atlantic region, granite and shale bedrock are found, which contain very little buffering material. Soil formed from low-buffering materials and the waters that drain from them are, therefore, susceptible to acidification, even under low acid deposition.

== Effects on ecosystems ==
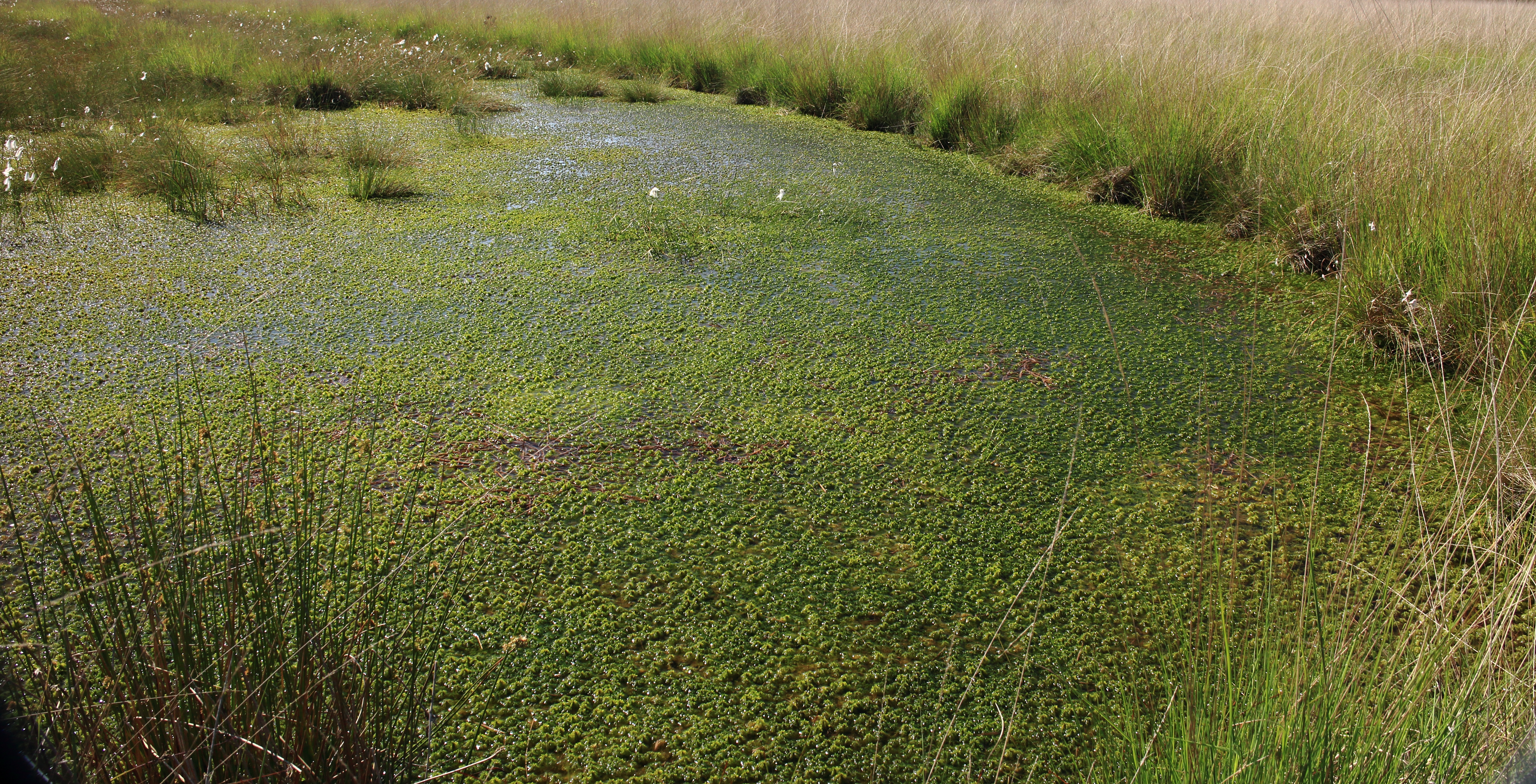
This pond shows an abundance of Sphagnum

Acidification of freshwater ecosystems can decrease native biodiversity and can alter ecosystem structure and function entirely. Macro-invertebrates and large vertebrates exhibit higher mortality and lower reproductive rates under acidified conditions. Conversely, some algae, and some mosses like Sphagnum, thrive in acidified environments, and may quickly dominate these habitats, outcompeting other species. In particular, it is common to see an increase in the abundance of the sphagnum. Sphagnum has a high capacity to exchange H^{+} for basic cations within freshwater. The thick layer of sphagnum restricts the exchange between surface water and sediment, further contributing to reduction in nutrient cycling in the ecosystem. Aquatic biomonitoring can be used to examine the health of aquatic ecosystems.

Soil that undergoes acidification can negatively impact agriculture. Some species are able to withstand low pH levels in their environment. For example, frogs and perches can withstand a pH level of 4. This allows these species to be unaffected by the acid deposition in their aquatic environment, allowing them to survive in these conditions. However, most aquatic species, such as clams and snails, are unable to withstand low pH levels which negatively impacts their growth and survival. The high acidic levels deteriorate their thick shells decreasing their protection from predators.

== Minimizing acidification ==
Agricultural runoff is a major source of nitrogen and phosphorus, which contribute to freshwater acidification. Implementing best management practices (BMPs) in agriculture, such as reducing the use of chemical fertilizers, improving manure management, and adopting precision agriculture techniques, can significantly reduce nutrient runoff into water bodies. Establishing riparian buffer zones—strips of vegetation planted along water bodies—can also help to filter pollutants from agricultural fields before they reach freshwater systems. These measures not only reduce acidification but also mitigate eutrophication and improve overall water quality.

Wetlands and peatlands serve as buffers for freshwater systems by absorbing pollutants regulating water flow. Wetland restoration projects have been shown to increase the resilience of freshwater systems to acidification and other environmental stressors.

Liming is one of the most common and best practices for remediating acidification. In this process calcium carbonate (CaCO_{3}) is added to the system to increase pH levels. By increasing pH levels, liming helps the habitat return to a similar condition to how it was before acidification.

Some techniques are used to mitigate the mining contribution of acidification, like passive treatment through natural biological processes and treatment of the drainage with alkaline materials. Another important factor to consider when looking at reducing freshwater acidification are the choices people make to protect the environment everyday. Following a circular approach to reduce, reuse and recycle can reduce resource depletion and waste minimization, including decreasing water acidity.

== Regulations ==
Regulation of anthropogenic emissions, specifically SO_{x} and NO_{x}, can lead to large decreases of acid rain and acidic bodies of water. For example, the Canada-United States Air Quality Agreement has greatly minimized acid rain and ozone levels by 78% in Canada and 92% in the United States, as of 2020. Moreover, investing in scientists to monitor and collect data is essential to create a model used to establish successful policies. For instance, a protocol can be implemented to mitigate the issue. Also, governments could invest funds to subsidize companies to decrease their pollution and incentivize them to use innovative methods of production, to lower both greenhouse gas emissions and the amount of acidic substances created. Furthermore, government institutions across the globe can connect on the issue of acidification and work together to find a feasible solution through international agreements. Some successful government implementations include the Acid Rain Program established in the United States in 1995, and the most recent Gothenburg Protocol, established by the United Nations Economic Commission for Europe (UNECE) to reduce acidification.

== Case Study: Freshwater Acidification in the Adirondack Lakes, New York ==
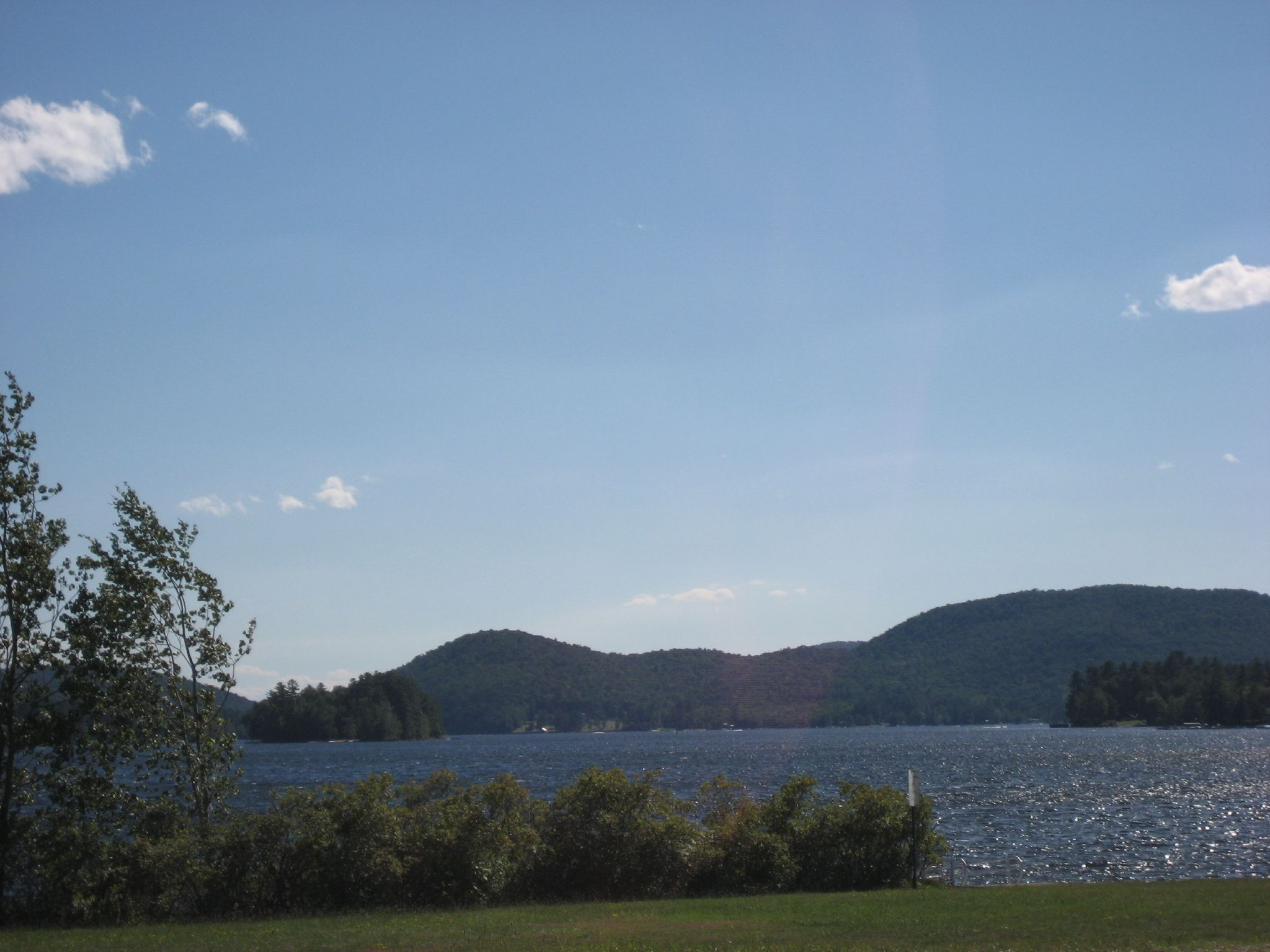
Adirondack Lake, USA

The Adirondack Lakes in New York is one of the most well-documented case studies for freshwater acidification. As early as the 1970s, it was showing signs of acidification due to low values of acid ANC (Acid Neutralizing Capacity) industrial emissions of sulfur dioxide (SO_{2}) and nitrogen oxides (NO_{x}), resulting in acid rain. Winds carried the pollutant from Midwestern United States to the Adirondack region and decreasing the pH level of water bodies and surrounding soils. The acidification of waters resulted in a significant decline in aquatic biodiversity, including the disappearance of fish and crustacean species.

Several efforts were made to recover the environmental condition of Adirondack lakes by reducing SO_{2} and NO_{x} emissions through the Clean Air Act 1990. Monitoring data shows improvements in water quality, although many ecosystems remain vulnerable due to the long-lasting effects of acid deposition on soils and watersheds. This case demonstrates how the Clean Air Act have played a role in addressing the anthropogenic causes of freshwater acidification. However, studies show that ecological recovery remains challenging due to the long-term impacts of acid deposition.
