= Little Blue Mountain =

Mountain in New York, United States

- Location within New York Location within the United States

Highest point
- Elevation: 2,795 feet (852 m)
- Coordinates: 43°53′02″N 74°28′42″W

Geography
- Location: NW of Blue Mountain Lake, New York, U.S.
- Topo map: USGS Deerland

Little Blue Mountain is a mountain located in Adirondack Mountains of New York located in the Town of Indian Lake northwest of Blue Mountain Lake.
