= Blue Ridge (Hamilton County, New York) =

Mountain in New York, United States

- Location within New York Location within the United States

Highest point
- Elevation: 3,189 feet (972 m)
- Coordinates: 43°47′30″N 74°29′18″W, 43°47′15″N 74°30′16″W

Geography
- Location: SE of Blue Mountain Lake, New York, U.S.
- Topo map: USGS Blue Mountain Lake

Blue Ridge is a ridge located in Adirondack Mountains of New York located in the Towns of Indian Lake and Lake Pleasant, east-northeast of Blue Mountain Lake.
