= Sprague Pond =

- Location within New York Sprague Pond (the United States)
- Location: Hamilton County, New York, United States
- Coordinates: 43°47′49″N 74°22′33″W
- Type: Lake
- Primary outflows: Sprague Brook
- Basin countries: United States
- Surface area: 58 acres (0.23 km^{2})
- Max. depth: 23 feet (7.0 m)
- Shore length^{1}: 1.2 miles (1.9 km)
- Surface elevation: 1,847 feet (563 m)
- Islands: 2
- Settlements: Blue Mountain Lake, New York
- ^{1} Shore length is not a well-defined measure.

Sprague Pond is located southeast of Blue Mountain Lake, New York. Fish species present in the lake are brown trout, golden shiner, and sunfish. There is a carry down via trail off CR-12, on the south shore. No motors are allowed on this lake.
