= Stark Hills =

Mountain in New York, United States

- Location within New York Adirondack Park Location within the United States

Highest point
- Elevation: 2,283 feet (696 m)
- Coordinates: 43°49′57″N 74°18′57″W

Geography
- Location: NW of Indian Lake, New York, U.S.
- Topo map: USGS Rock Lake

Stark Hills is a mountain located in Adirondack Mountains of New York located in the Town of Indian Lake northwest of Indian Lake.
