= Casey Mountain =

Mountain in New York, United States

- Location within New York Adirondack Park Location within the United States

Highest point
- Elevation: 2,444 feet (745 m)
- Coordinates: 43°46′38″N 74°07′11″W

Geography
- Location: E of Indian Lake, New York, U.S.
- Topo map: USGS Dutton Mountain

Casey Mountain is a mountain located in Adirondack Mountains of New York located in the Town of Indian Lake east of Indian Lake.
