= Bad Luck Mountain =

Mountain in New York, United States

- Location within New York Location within the United States

Highest point
- Elevation: 2,142 feet (653 m)
- Coordinates: 43°48′27″N 74°11′39″W

Geography
- Location: ENE of Indian Lake, New York, U.S.
- Topo map: USGS Bad Luck Mountain

Bad Luck Mountain is a mountain located in Adirondack Mountains of New York located in the Town of Indian Lake east-northeast of Indian Lake.
