= Beaver Mountain (New York) =

Mountain in Haminton County, New York, United States

- Location within New York Adirondack Park Location within the United States

Highest point
- Elevation: 3,218 feet (981 m)
- Coordinates: 43°43′37″N 74°20′32″W

Geography
- Location: SSW of Indian Lake, New York, U.S.
- Topo map: USGS Indian Lake

Beaver Mountain, formerly known as Squaw Mountain, is a mountain located in Adirondack Mountains in Hamilton County, New York, United States, in the Town of Indian Lake south-southwest of Indian Lake.
