= White Birch Ridge =

Mountain in New York, United States

- Location within New York Adirondack Park Location within the United States

Highest point
- Elevation: 1,801 feet (549 m)
- Coordinates: 43°48′59″N 74°15′44″W

Geography
- Location: N of Indian Lake, New York, U.S.
- Topo map: USGS Rock Lake

White Birch Ridge is a ridge located in Adirondack Mountains of New York located in the Town of Indian Lake north of Indian Lake.
