= Middlemount (disambiguation) =

Middlemount is a mining town in Queensland, Australia.

Middlemount may also refer to:

- Middlemount Airport, the airport for the above mining town
- Middlemount (townland), County Laois, Ireland

== See also ==
- Middle Mountain (disambiguation)
