= Black Mountain (Hamilton County, New York) =

Mountain in New York, United States

- Location within New York Location within the United States

Highest point
- Elevation: 2,290 feet (700 m)
- Coordinates: 43°46′40″N 74°04′29″W

Geography
- Location: E of Indian Lake, New York, U.S.
- Topo map: USGS Dutton Mountain

Black Mountain is a mountain located in Adirondack Mountains of New York located in the Town of Indian Lake east of Indian Lake.

== Climate ==
The climate is hemiboreal.

The average temperature is 5 °C. The warmest month is August, at 18 °C, and the coldest is January, at −12 °C.

The average rainfall is 1,431 mm per year. The wettest month is June, with 159 mm of rain, and the driest is November, with 94 mm.
