= P Gay Mountain =

Mountain in New York, United States

- Location within New York Adirondack Park Location within the United States

Highest point
- Elevation: 2,339 feet (713 m)
- Coordinates: 43°47′13″N 74°06′30″W

Geography
- Location: E of Indian Lake, New York, U.S.
- Topo map: USGS Dutton Mountain

P Gay Mountain is a mountain located in Adirondack Mountains of New York located in the Town of Indian Lake east of Indian Lake.

Its name likely is derived from the “P.K. Slip” to its north west on the Hudson River, located east of the “O.K. Slip” from which a lake, falls and creek still retain their name to this day.
