= Long Pond Ridge =

Mountain in New York, United States

- Location within New York Adirondack Park Location within the United States

Highest point
- Elevation: 2,231 feet (680 m)
- Coordinates: 43°38′24″N 74°18′05″W

Geography
- Location: S of Indian Lake, New York, U.S.
- Topo map: USGS Indian Lake

Long Pond Ridge is a ridge located in Adirondack Mountains of New York located in the Town of Indian Lake south of Indian Lake.
