= Windfall Hill =

Mountain in New York, United States

- Location within New York Adirondack Park Location within the United States

Highest point
- Elevation: 2,277 feet (694 m)
- Coordinates: 43°37′33″N 74°19′38″W

Geography
- Location: SSW of Indian Lake, New York, U.S.
- Topo map: USGS Indian Lake

Windfall Hill is a mountain located in the Adirondack Mountains of New York located in the Town of Indian Lake, south-southwest of Indian Lake.
