= Kunjamuk Mountain =

Mountain in New York, United States

- Location within New York Adirondack Park Location within the United States

Highest point
- Elevation: 2,969 feet (905 m)
- Coordinates: 43°39′57″N 74°17′08″W

Geography
- Location: S of Indian Lake, New York, U.S.
- Topo map: USGS Indian Lake

Kunjamuk Mountain is a mountain located in Adirondack Mountains of New York located in the Town of Indian Lake south of Indian Lake.
