= List of highways in Hamilton County, New York =

- Standard route marker for county routes in Hamilton County

- Hamilton County's road system, which mainly consists of state touring routes

Highway names
- Interstates: Interstate X (I-X)
- State: New York State Route X (NY X)
- County: County Route X (CR X)

System links
- New York Highways; Interstate; US; State; Reference; Parkways

The highway system of Hamilton County, New York, comprises 474.5 miles (763.6 km) of roads maintained by the New York State Department of Transportation (NYSDOT), the county, and its towns and villages. NYSDOT maintains five state touring routes in Hamilton County, which account for a combined 178.7 miles (287.6 km) of New York's state highway mileage. These five routes are supplemented by Hamilton County's county route system, which comprises 25 roads of varying length and importance. The 94.5-mile (152.1 km) system, maintained by the Hamilton County Department of Public Works, connects the state routes to a number of small hamlets and other points of interest.

Hamilton County's five state routes are spread throughout the county, which is the least populated in the state of New York. The routes are NY 8, NY 10, NY 28, NY 28N, and NY 30. The longest is NY 30, which extends for 83.72 miles (134.73 km) on a north–south alignment from the Fulton County line to the Franklin County line. The five state highways traverse highly rural sections of Adirondack Park; in fact, the only village along any of these roads is Speculator, located at the western junction of NY 8 and NY 30. NY 10 and NY 28 were assigned in 1924, while the others were assigned in 1930. NY 365 once passed through the county; however, it was truncated southwestward to end in Oneida County in the late 1950s. Additionally, NY 10 extended north along modern NY 30 to the Canada–US border until c. 1960, when it was replaced with NY 30 north of Speculator. Since the truncation of NY 10, there have not been any substantial changes to roads in Hamilton County.

== NY 8 ==
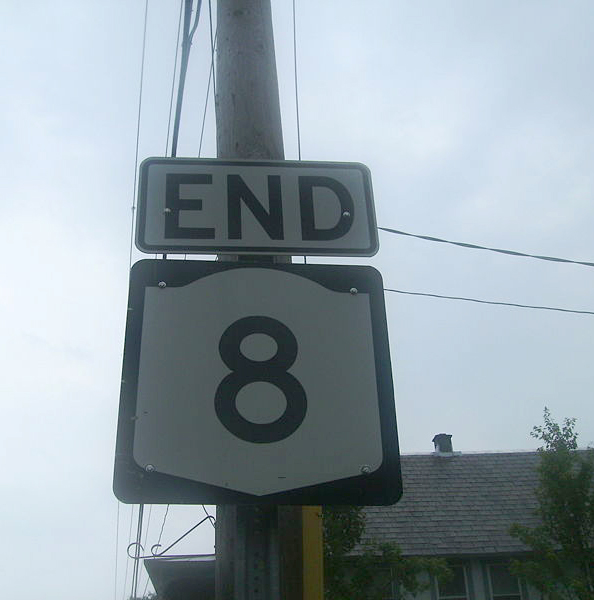
End of NY 8 in nearby Warren County

NY 8 is a state highway that is more than 200 miles (322 km) long. It stretches from Deposit in the Southern Tier to an intersection with NY 9N in Hague on the shores of Lake George. The stretch in Hamilton County is 43.30 miles (69.68 km) long, passing through mostly rural territory. NY 8 enters Hamilton County from Herkimer County west of Piseco and leaves the county for Warren County 20 miles (32 km) east of Wells. Along the way, NY 8 intersects the northern terminus of NY 10 in Arietta. The route is also one of two state routes to pass through the isolated village of Speculator; the other being NY 30. Speculator serves as the western endpoint of an overlap between NY 8 and NY 30, which extends for 10 miles (16 km) east to Wells. NY 8 was assigned as part of the 1930 renumbering of state highways in New York and has not been changed within Hamilton County since that time.

Major intersections

Location	mi	km	Destinations	Notes
West county line	0.00	0.00	NY 8 west	Continues into Herkimer County
Arietta	15.54	25.01	NY 10	
Speculator	27.75	44.66	NY 30 north	Southern terminus of overlap with NY 30
Wells	37.44	60.25	NY 30 south	Northern terminus of overlap with NY 30
East county line	43.30	69.68	NY 8 east	Continues into Warren County
1.000 mi = 1.609 km; 1.000 km = 0.621 mi

== NY 10 ==
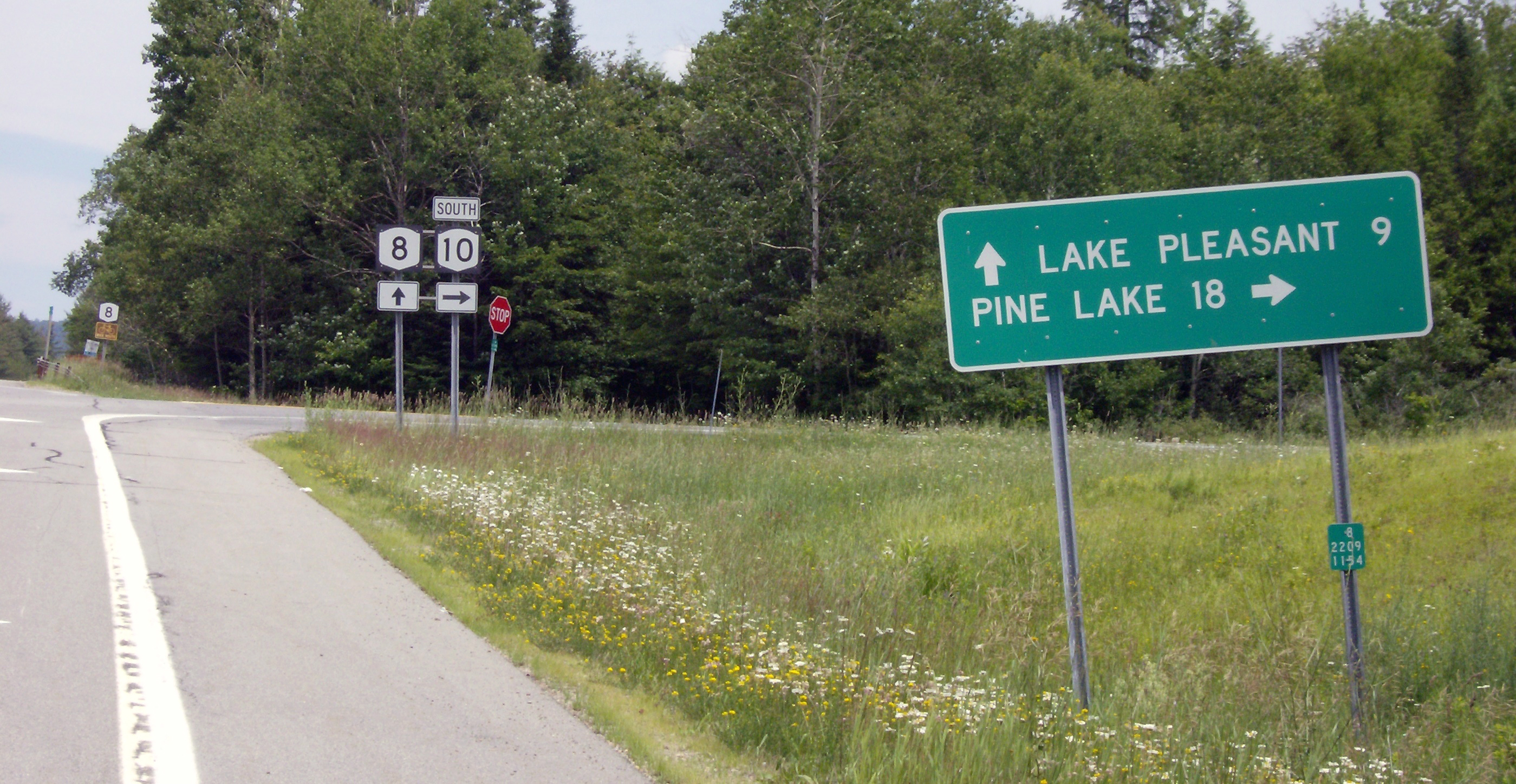
NY 10's northern terminus at NY 8 in Arietta

NY 10 is the shortest state route that traverses Hamilton County. At 14.51 miles (23.35 km) long, its only intersection in the county is its northern terminus at NY 8. NY 10 travels from the Fulton County line north of Caroga Lake to Arietta, where it ends at NY 8. The route passes through rural regions of Hamilton County and encounters no villages or noteworthy locations until Arietta. When NY 10 was first assigned in 1924, it entered the county from the east on modern NY 28N and left to the north on current NY 30. In the 1930 renumbering, NY 10 was realigned south of Long Lake to follow what is now NY 30 and NY 8 south to Arietta, from where it continued south to Fulton County on its modern routing. The resulting overlap with NY 8 was eliminated c. 1960 after NY 10 was replaced with an extended NY 30 north of Speculator.

Major intersections

Location	mi	km	Destinations	Notes
South county line	0.00	0.00	NY 10 south	Continues into Fulton County
Arietta	14.51	23.35	NY 8	
1.000 mi = 1.609 km; 1.000 km = 0.621 mi

== NY 28 ==
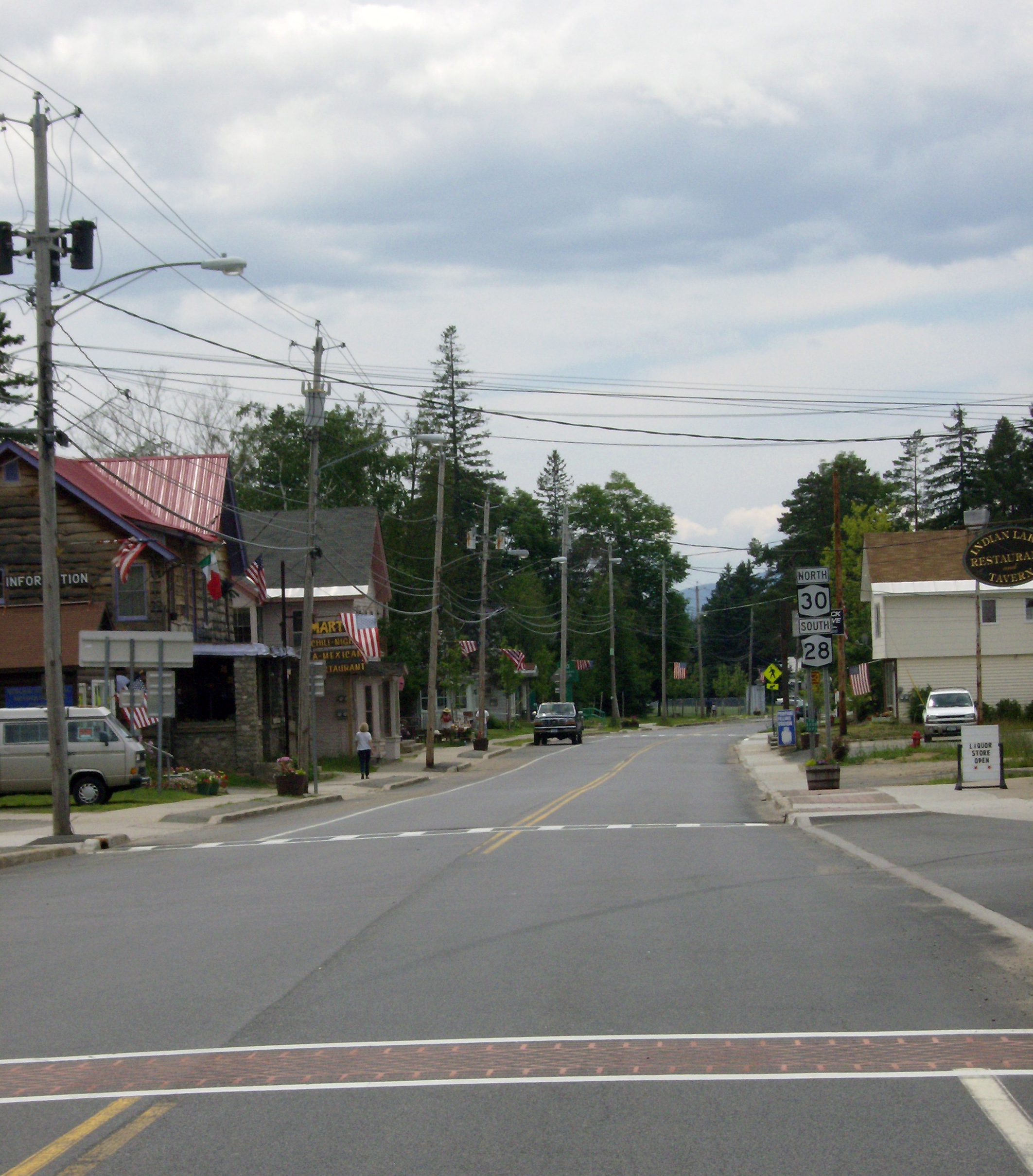
NY 28 and NY 30 in Indian Lake

NY 28 is a scenic, rural highway that runs for 49.08 miles (79 km) from the Herkimer County line northeast of the NY 12 intersection to the Warren County line near Blue Mountain Lake. Heading away from the western county line, NY 28 follows the Fulton Chain Lakes, which are numbered consecutively as the route and lakes continue northward. At Blue Mountain Lake, NY 28 and NY 30 become concurrent at an intersection that also serves as the western terminus of NY 28N, a suffixed route of NY 28. From here, NY 28 and NY 30 head to the southeast for over 10 miles (16 km) into Indian Lake, where NY 30 breaks from the route and heads southward. NY 28 was assigned in 1924, but was not extended into Hamilton County until the 1930 renumbering. Its number has remained unchanged within Hamilton County since that time.

Major intersections

Location	mi	km	Destinations	Notes
West county line	0.00	0.00	NY 28 west	Continues into Herkimer County
Hamlet of Blue Mountain Lake	25.73	41.41	NY 28N / NY 30 north	Western terminus of overlap with NY 30
Indian Lake	36.93	59.43	NY 30 south	Eastern terminus of overlap with NY 30
East county line	49.08	78.99	NY 28 east	Continues into Warren County
1.000 mi = 1.609 km; 1.000 km = 0.621 mi

== NY 28N ==
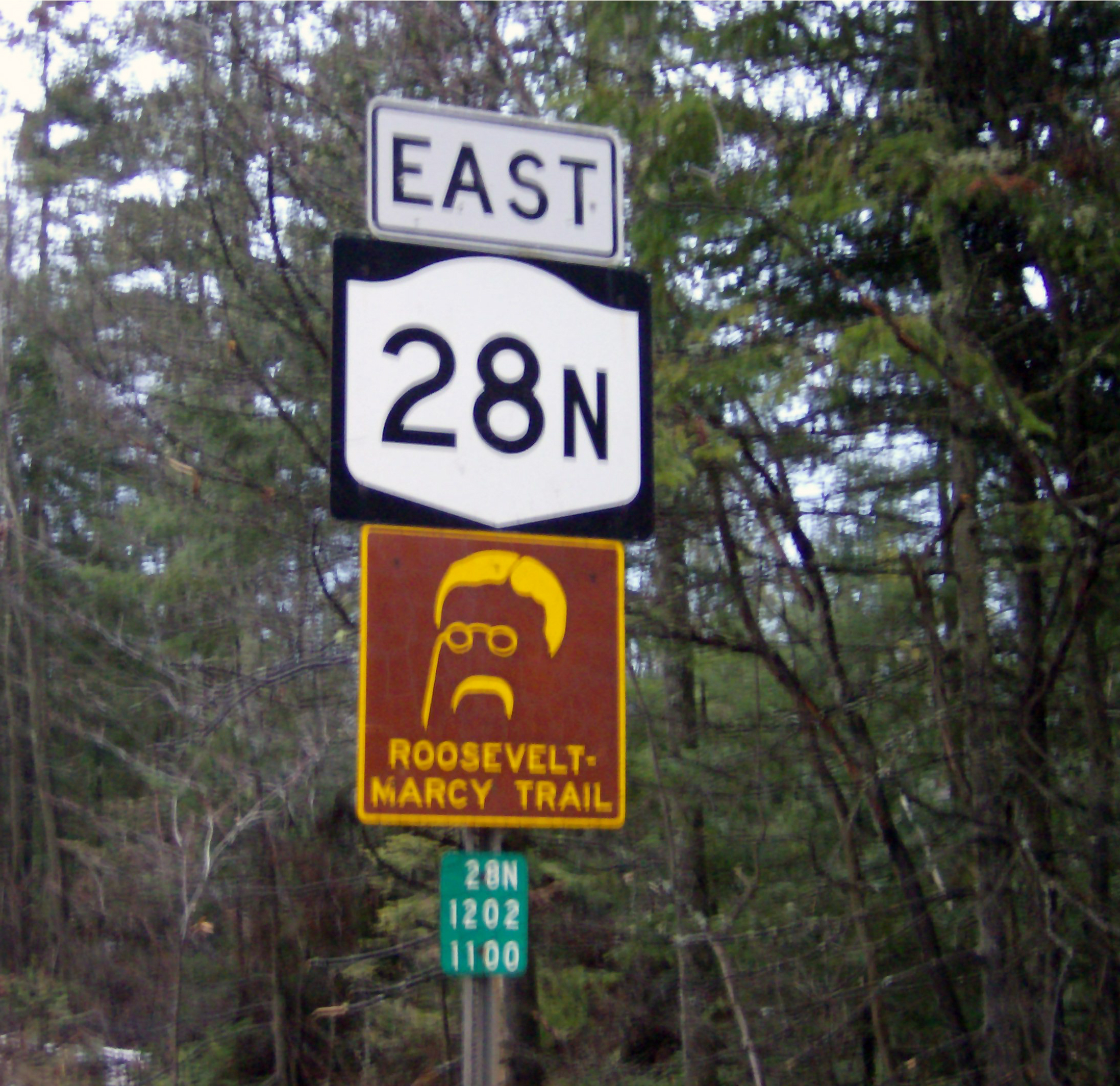
NY 28N shield in nearby Essex County

NY 28N, a suffixed route of NY 28, is the only state route that begins in the county itself. Only 19.66 miles (31.64 km) of its length is in Hamilton County, roughly 40 percent of the route's 51 miles (82 km) total across three counties. The route begins at an intersection with NY 28 and NY 30 at Blue Mountain Lake. Concurrent with the latter highway, NY 28N heads northward through mountainous parts of Hamilton County to Long Lake, where NY 30 splits and heads in the direction of Franklin County. From here, NY 28N heads eastward, passing some mountains before entering Essex County and continuing into Newcomb.

NY 28N was assigned as a suffixed route of the extended NY 28 in the 1930 renumbering. The concurrency that runs from Blue Mountain Lake to Long Lake was originally part of NY 10, which used to occupy all of modern NY 30 north of Speculator. When NY 10 was truncated c. 1960, the highway became concurrent with NY 30 instead.

Major intersections

Location	mi	km	Destinations	Notes
Hamlet of Blue Mountain Lake	0.00	0.00	NY 28 / NY 30 south	Southern terminus of overlap with NY 30
Long Lake	10.64	17.12	NY 30 north	Northern terminus of overlap with NY 30
East county line	19.66	31.64	NY 28N east	Continues into Essex County
1.000 mi = 1.609 km; 1.000 km = 0.621 mi

== NY 30 ==
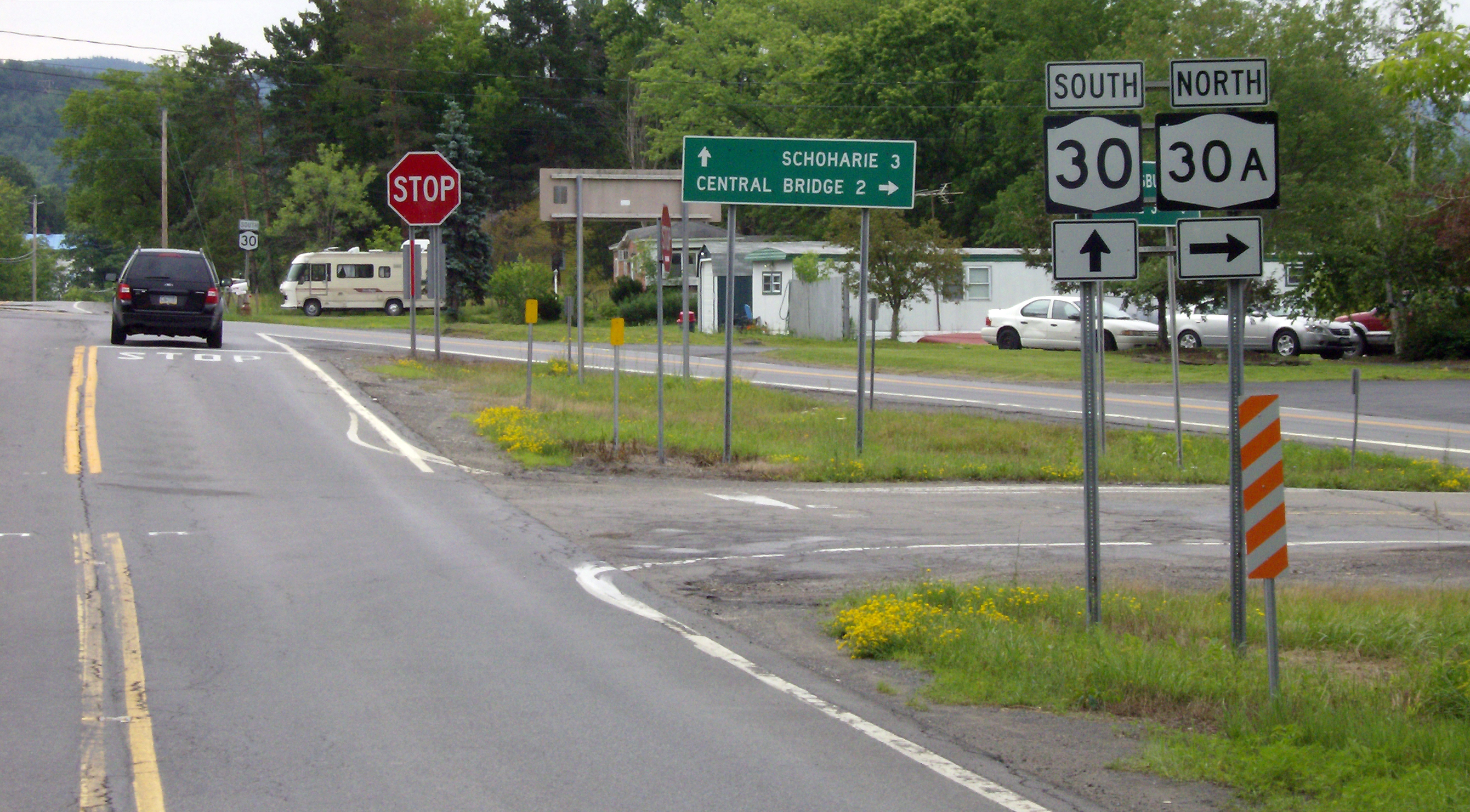
NY 30 and its lone suffixed route in nearby Schoharie County

NY 30 stretches for 83.73 miles (134.75 km) within the county, making it the longest state highway in Hamilton County. NY 30 is one of two highways that enters a village in Hamilton County, the other being NY 8. The route overlaps three other state routes in Hamilton County: NY 8 near Speculator, NY 28 from Indian Lake to Blue Mountain Lake, and NY 28N from Blue Mountain Lake to Long Lake. NY 30 stretches from the Fulton County line north of Mayfield to the Franklin County line north of Long Lake and NY 28N.

Initially, NY 30 was not the longest state highway in Hamilton County. When it was assigned in the 1930 renumbering, NY 30 followed its current routing to Wells, where it terminated at NY 8. The remainder of modern NY 30 was part of NY 8 from Wells to Speculator and part of NY 10 from Speculator to the Canada–US border. Ca. 1960, NY 10 was truncated south to Arietta, and NY 30 was extended northward to the Canada–US border by way of NY 8 and NY 10's former routing.

Major intersections

Location	mi	km	Destinations	Notes
South county line	0.00	0.00	NY 30 south	Continues into Fulton County
Wells	16.55	26.63	NY 8 east	Southern terminus of overlap with NY 8
Speculator	26.24	42.23	NY 8 west	Northern terminus of overlap with NY 8
Indian Lake	50.12	80.66	NY 28 east	Southern terminus of overlap with NY 28
Hamlet of Blue Mountain Lake	61.26	98.59	NY 28 west / NY 28N	Northern terminus of overlap with NY 28; southern terminus of overlap with NY 28N
Long Lake	71.96	115.81	NY 28N east	Northern terminus of overlap with NY 28N
North county line	83.72	134.73	NY 30 north	Continues into Franklin County
1.000 mi = 1.609 km; 1.000 km = 0.621 mi

== Former routes ==
Four other state routes once entered Hamilton County, but no longer do. Two of these routes—NY 80 and NY 365—were simply truncated out of the county, while two others—NY 10A and NY 54—no longer exist.

=== NY 10A ===
NY 10A was a southerly alternate route of then-NY 10 between Long Lake and North Creek, Warren County, via Blue Mountain Lake. While NY 10 followed modern NY 28N between the two locations, NY 10A utilized what is now NY 30 and NY 28. It was assigned in the late 1920s and replaced by a realigned NY 10 and an extended NY 28 in the 1930 renumbering of state highways in New York.

=== NY 54 ===
NY 54 was a circuitous east–west route that extended from Utica, Oneida County, to Fonda, Montgomery County, via Speculator and Benson. It entered Hamilton County from Herkimer County on modern NY 8 and proceeded east through Speculator to Wells, where it turned south to follow what is now NY 30 to the Fulton County line. It was assigned in the mid-1920s and split into several routes, including NY 8 and NY 30, in the 1930 renumbering.

=== NY 80 ===
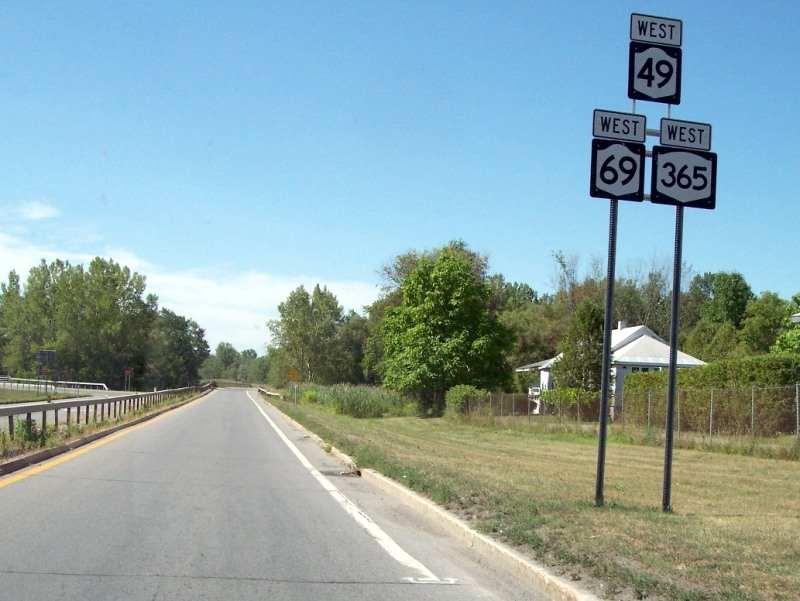
Westbound along NY 49, NY 69 and NY 365 in Rome

NY 80 originally continued much farther north than it does today. When it was assigned in the late 1920s, it continued north from Fort Plain, Montgomery County, to NY 54 in Arietta by way of modern NY 10. The Arietta – Fort Plain portion of NY 80 was replaced by a realigned NY 10 as part of the 1930 renumbering.

=== NY 365 ===
NY 365 is the only post-1930 state route that once entered Hamilton County, but no longer does. When it was assigned c. 1932, the route entered Hamilton County from Herkimer County, overlapping with NY 28 until Blue Mountain Lake. Here, it turned off NY 28 and onto NY 10 (later NY 30) and NY 28N. The three routes overlapped to Long Lake, where NY 28N split off from both NY 10 and NY 365. The two highways continued northward, leaving Hamilton County and passing into Franklin County north of Long Lake. NY 365 was truncated in the late 1950s to end near the Oneida County village of Holland Patent, eliminating a series of overlaps between NY 365 and other state routes that collectively extended from Holland Patent to Plattsburgh, Clinton County.

== County routes ==
The Hamilton County Department of Public Works maintains a system of 25 county-designated highways, which make up almost 100 miles (160 km) of the county's highway system. The highest numbered route is CR 25, located in Hope, and the lowest numbered one is CR 1, which is located in Inlet. Most of the county routes serve as connectors to state routes or other county routes. Several end suddenly and become local roads, and some cross the county line and become another county route. Hamilton County's 25-route system is the smallest system of signed county routes in the state of New York. The closest one after is Tioga County, located in the Southern Tier of New York. Route numbers, lengths, and termini are derived from the 2010 NYSDOT Hamilton County inventory unless otherwise noted.

Route	Length (mi)	Length (km)	From	Via	To	Notes
CR 1	0.95	1.53	Herkimer County line (becomes CR 118)	South Shore Road in Inlet	NY 28	
CR 2	0.42	0.68	NY 28	Raquette Lake Road in Long Lake	Church Street	Serves hamlet of Raquette Lake
CR 3	11.54	18.57	Dead end at North Point Estate	North Point Road in Long Lake and Arietta	NY 28N / NY 30	Ends in hamlet of Hasbroucks
CR 4	8.06	12.97	Dead end at Chimney Mountain	Big Brook Road in Indian Lake	NY 30	
CR 5	2.47	3.98	NY 30	Algonquin Drive in Wells	NY 30	Runs along west shore of Lake Algonquin
CR 6	5.94	9.56	Fulton County line (becomes CR 125)	Benson Road in Benson	NY 30	
CR 6A (1)	0.60	0.97	Dead end	Cole and Town Barn Roads in Benson	NY 30	
CR 6A (2)	0.15	0.24	CR 6	West Stony Creek Road in Benson	Dead end	
CR 7	5.83	9.38	CR 15	Hope Falls Road in Hope	Mason Road	
CR 8	3.80	6.12	NY 30	Griffin Road in Wells	NY 8	
CR 9	0.92	1.48	NY 30	Lakeshore Drive in Indian Lake	NY 30	Serves hamlet of Sabael
CR 10	8.26	13.29	Dead end at St. Lawrence County line	Sabattis Road in Long Lake	CR 10A	Serves hamlet of Sabattis
CR 10A	6.04	9.72	NY 30	Sabattis Circle Road in Long Lake	NY 30	
CR 11	6.04	9.72	NY 8	South Shore Road in Lake Pleasant	Downey Avenue	Serves village of Speculator
CR 12	7.11	11.44	West end of county maintenance	Cedar River Road in Indian Lake	NY 28 / NY 30	
CR 13	0.52	0.84	NY 28	Seventh Lake Road in Inlet	Seventh Lake	
CR 14	2.07	3.33	Limekiln Lake State Campground	Limekiln Lake Road in Inlet	NY 28	
CR 15	2.35	3.78	Fulton County line	Old Northville Road in Hope	NY 30	Former routing of NY 30
CR 16	2.36	3.80	NY 30	Gilmantown Road in Wells	North end of county maintenance	Serves hamlet of Gilmantown
CR 17	4.00	6.44	NY 8	French Road in Morehouse	NY 8	
CR 18	2.20	3.54	CR 4	Chamberlain Road in Indian Lake	NY 28	
CR 19	1.05	1.69	NY 28	Durant Road in Indian Lake	NY 28 / NY 30	Serves hamlet of Blue Mountain Lake
CR 20	1.79	2.88	Dead end at Forked Lake State Campground	Forked Lake Road in Arietta	CR 3	
CR 21	1.26	2.03	Fulton County line (becomes CR 143)	Maple Grove Road in Hope	Dead end	Serves hamlet of Maple Grove
CR 23			NY 8	Higgins Bay Road in Arietta	NY 8	Served hamlet of Higgins Bay; former number; now town-maintained
CR 24	8.02	12.91	NY 8	Old Piseco Road in Arietta	NY 8	Serves hamlet of Piseco
CR 25	0.74	1.19	NY 30	Bennett Road in Hope	NY 30	

== See also ==
- County routes in New York
