= Burgess Mountain =

Mountain in New York, United States

- Location within New York Adirondack Park Location within the United States

Highest point
- Elevation: 3,189 feet (972 m)
- Coordinates: 43°45′07″N 74°21′24″W

Geography
- Location: SW of Indian Lake, New York, U.S.
- Topo map: USGS Rock Lake

Burgess Mountain is a mountain located in Adirondack Mountains of New York located in the Town of Indian Lake southwest of Indian Lake. It was formally referred to as Little Panther Mountain.
