= Starbuck Mountain =

Mountain in New York, United States

- Location within New York Adirondack Park Location within the United States

Highest point
- Elevation: 2,533 feet (772 m)
- Coordinates: 43°46′41″N 74°05′37″W

Geography
- Location: E of Indian Lake, New York, U.S.
- Topo map: USGS Dutton Mountain

Starbuck Mountain is a mountain located in Adirondack Mountains of New York located in the Town of Indian Lake east of Indian Lake.
