= Cascade Pond =

- Location within New York Cascade Pond (the United States)
- Location: Hamilton County, New York
- Coordinates: 43°49′40″N 74°26′18″W
- Type: Lake
- Basin countries: United States
- Surface area: 35 acres (0.14 km^{2})
- Average depth: 6 feet (1.8 m)
- Max. depth: 23 feet (7.0 m)
- Shore length^{1}: 1.5 miles (2.4 km)
- Surface elevation: 2,139 feet (652 m)
- Islands: 6
- Settlements: Blue Mountain Lake, New York
- ^{1} Shore length is not a well-defined measure.

Cascade Pond is a small lake located south of Blue Mountain Lake, New York. Fish species present in the lake are brook trout, and black bullhead. There is access by trail from Lake Durant along the east shore. No motors are allowed on this lake.
