= Pine Mountain (New York) =

Pine Mountain is the name of several elevations in New York State:

- Pine Mountain (Otsego County, New York)
- Pine Mountain (Arietta, New York), in Arietta, Hamilton County
- Pine Mountain (Essex County, New York)
- Pine Mountain (Schoharie County, New York)
- Pine Mountain (Wells, New York), in Hamilton County
