= Crotched Pond =

- Location within New York Crotched Pond (the United States)
- Location: Hamilton County, New York, United States
- Coordinates: 43°40′52″N 74°17′37″W
- Type: Lake
- Basin countries: United States
- Surface area: 65 acres (0.26 km^{2})
- Average depth: 10 feet (3.0 m)
- Max. depth: 31 feet (9.4 m)
- Shore length^{1}: 2.4 miles (3.9 km)
- Surface elevation: 1,821 feet (555 m)
- Islands: 1
- Settlements: Indian Lake, New York
- ^{1} Shore length is not a well-defined measure.

Crotched Pond is located south of Indian Lake, New York. Fish species present in the lake include brook trout and white sucker. There is access via trail from east shore of Indian Lake. No motors are allowed on this lake.
