= Sabael, New York =

- Hamlet
- Location within New York Location within the United States
- Coordinates: 43°43′42″N 74°18′21″W
- Country: United States
- State: New York
- County: Hamilton
- Town: Indian Lake
- Elevation: 1,745 ft (532 m)
- Time zone: UTC-5 (Eastern (EST))
  - Summer (DST): UTC-4 (EDT)
- ZIP code: 12864
- Area codes: 518 & 838
- GNIS feature ID: 963152

Sabael is a hamlet in the town of Indian Lake, Hamilton County, New York, United States. The community is located along the western shore of Indian Lake and New York State Route 30, 16.2 miles (26.1 km) north of Speculator. The hamlet is named after Sabael Benedict, an Abenaki who travelled down from the Canadian province of Quebec to discover Indian Lake. Sabael had a post office until March 9, 2013; it still has its own ZIP code, 12864.
