= Boreas River =

River in New York, United States

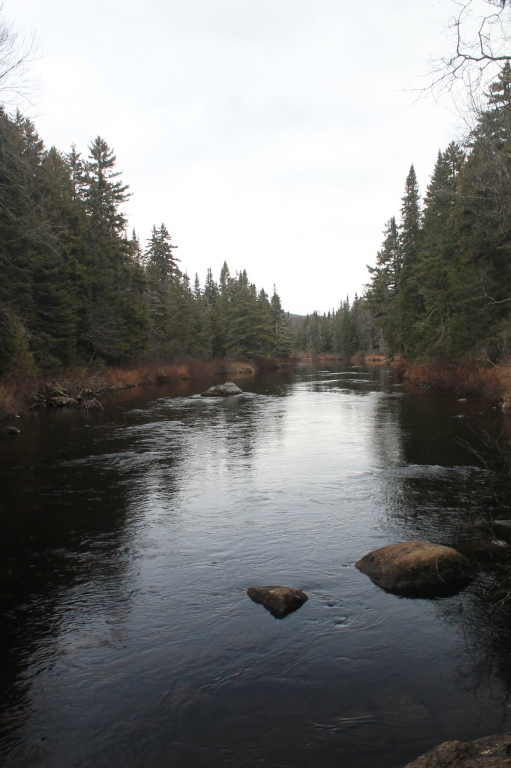
- Boreas River by Hewitt Eddy Trail

- Location of the mouth of the Boreas River Boreas River (the United States)

Location
- Country: United States
- State: New York
- Counties: Essex, Hamilton

Physical characteristics
- Source: Boreas Ponds
  - location: NNE of Boreas River (hamlet)
  - coordinates: 44°02′35″N 73°54′21″W
  - elevation: 1,978 ft (603 m)
- Mouth: Hudson River
  - location: SE of Forks Mountain
  - coordinates: 43°47′51″N 74°02′52″W
  - elevation: 1,161 ft (354 m)

Boreas River is a river in Essex County and Hamilton County in the U.S. State of New York. Boreas River begins at Boreas Ponds north-northeast of the Hamlet of Boreas River and flows southeastward before converging with the Hudson River southeast of Forks Mountain.
