= Castle Rock (New York) =

Mountain in New York, United States

- Location within New York Location within the United States

Highest point
- Elevation: 2,438 feet (743 m)
- Coordinates: 43°52′34″N 74°28′06″W

Geography
- Location: NW of Blue Mountain Lake, New York, U.S.
- Topo map: USGS Deerland

Castle Rock is a scenic viewpoint in Adirondack Mountains of New York located northwest of Blue Mountain Lake.
