= Forks Mountain (Essex County, New York) =

Mountain in New York, United States

- Location within New York Adirondack Park Location within the United States

Highest point
- Elevation: 1,939 feet (591 m)
- Coordinates: 43°48′22″N 74°03′54″W

Geography
- Location: NNE of North River, Essex County, New York, U.S.
- Topo map: USGS Dutton Mountain

Forks Mountain is a summit located in Adirondack Mountains of New York located in the Town of Minerva, north-northeast of the hamlet of North River. It is named Forks Mountain due to it being inside the Fork where the Hudson River meets the Boreas River. Kellogg Mountain and Venison Mountain is located east, and Pine Mountain and Harris Rift Mountain are located west of Forks Mountain.
