= Big Bad Luck Pond =

- Location within New York Big Bad Luck Pond (the United States)
- Location: Hamilton County, New York, United States
- Coordinates: 43°47′31″N 74°10′15″W
- Type: Lake
- Basin countries: United States
- Surface area: 115 acres (0.47 km^{2})
- Average depth: 11 feet (3.4 m)
- Max. depth: 40 feet (12 m)
- Shore length^{1}: 3 miles (4.8 km)
- Surface elevation: 1,690 feet (520 m)
- Islands: 1
- Settlements: Indian Lake, New York
- ^{1} Shore length is not a well-defined measure.

Big Bad Luck Pond is a lake located east of Indian Lake, New York. Fish species present in the lake are largemouth bass, northern pike, white sucker, rock bass, black bullhead, yellow perch, and pumpkinseed sunfish. There is a carry down on trail off Route 28 on the northeast corner.
