= Peaked Hill =

Peaked Hill may refer to:

- Peaked Hill (Hong Kong)
- Peaked Hill Bars, off the Atlantic Coast of Provincetown, Massachusetts

== See also ==
- Peaked Mountain (disambiguation)
