= Harris Rift Mountain =

Mountain in New York, United States

- Location within New York Adirondack Park Location within the United States

Highest point
- Elevation: 1,801 feet (549 m)
- Coordinates: 43°48′16″N 74°05′08″W

Geography
- Location: E of Indian Lake, New York, U.S.
- Topo map: USGS Dutton Mountain

Harris Rift Mountain is a mountain located in Adirondack Mountains of New York located in the Town of Indian Lake east of Indian Lake.
