= Middle Mountain (disambiguation) =

Middle Mountain is part of the Sierra Nevada mountain range in California.

Middle Mountain may also refer to:

- Middle Mountain (New Hampshire)
- Middle Mountain (Delaware County, New York)
- Middle Mountain (Hamilton County, New York)
- Middle Mountain (West Virginia), part of the Shavers Fork Mountain Complex
