= Peaked Mountain (Hamilton County, New York) =

Mountain in New York, United States

- Location within New York Location within the United States

Highest point
- Elevation: 2,582 feet (787 m)
- Coordinates: 43°53′07″N 74°27′53″W

Geography
- Location: NW of Blue Mountain Lake, New York, U.S.
- Topo map: USGS Deerland

Peaked Mountain is a mountain located in Adirondack Mountains of New York located in the Town of Indian Lake northwest of Blue Mountain Lake.
