= Pine Lake (Essex–Hamilton County, New York) =

- Location within New York Pine Lake (the United States)
- Location: Hamilton County, Essex County, New York, United States
- Coordinates: 43°50′50″N 74°14′57″W, 43°50′47″N 74°15′09″W
- Type: Lake
- Basin countries: United States
- Surface area: 88 acres (0.36 km^{2})
- Max. depth: 78 feet (24 m)
- Shore length^{1}: 2.7 miles (4.3 km)
- Surface elevation: 1,591 feet (485 m)
- Islands: 2
- Settlements: Indian Lake, New York
- ^{1} Shore length is not a well-defined measure.

Pine Lake is located north of Indian Lake, New York. Fish species present in the lake are brook trout, white sucker, rock bass, black bullhead, and sunfish.
