= Kings Flow =

- Location within New York Location within the United States
- Location: Hamilton County, New York, United States
- Coordinates: 43°40′33.8″N 74°13′58.8″W
- Type: Lake
- Primary inflows: Puffer Pond Brook, Carroll Brook, Wakely Brook
- Primary outflows: Round Lake Brook
- Basin countries: United States
- Surface area: 194 acres (0.79 km^{2})
- Average depth: 2 feet (0.61 m)
- Max. depth: 11 feet (3.4 m)
- Shore length^{1}: 4 miles (6.4 km)
- Surface elevation: 1,709 feet (521 m)
- Islands: 1
- Settlements: Indian Lake, New York
- ^{1} Shore length is not a well-defined measure.

Kings Flow is a lake located southeast of Indian Lake, New York. Fish species present in the lake are largemouth bass, yellow perch, white sucker, rock bass, black bullhead, and sunfish. It is accessible by state trails on private lands with permission from landowners. No motors are allowed on this lake.
