= Bell Mountain (New York) =

Mountain in New York, United States

- Location within New York Location within the United States

Highest point
- Elevation: 2,339 feet (713 m)
- Coordinates: 43°46′51″N 74°09′13″W

Geography
- Location: E of Indian Lake, New York, U.S.
- Topo map: USGS Bad Luck Mountain

Bell Mountain is a mountain located in Adirondack Mountains of New York located in the Town of Indian Lake east of Indian Lake.
