= Tongue Mountain =

Mountain in New York, United States

- Location within New York Location within the United States

Highest point
- Elevation: 3,159 feet (963 m)
- Coordinates: 43°54′41″N 74°20′44″W

Geography
- Location: ENE of Blue Mountain Lake, New York, U.S.
- Topo map: USGS Dun Brook Mountain

Tongue Mountain is a mountain located in Adirondack Mountains of New York located in the Town of Indian Lake east-northeast of Blue Mountain Lake.
