= Long Pond (Hamilton County, New York) =

- Location within New York Long Pond (the United States)
- Location: Hamilton County, New York
- Coordinates: 43°38′26″N 74°17′22″W
- Type: Lake
- Basin countries: United States
- Surface area: 38 acres (0.15 km^{2})
- Average depth: 11 feet (3.4 m)
- Max. depth: 43 feet (13 m)
- Shore length^{1}: 1.8 miles (2.9 km)
- Surface elevation: 1,854 feet (565 m)
- Settlements: Sabael, New York
- ^{1} Shore length is not a well-defined measure.

Long Pond is a lake located southeast of Sabael, New York. Fish species present in the lake are brook trout, white sucker, black bullhead, sunfish, and pickerel. Access to the pond via trail from road on the west shore. No motors are allowed on this pond.
