= Bell Mountain (Nevada) =

Mountain in the state of Nevada

Coordinates: 39°09′48″N 118°05′09″W

Bell Mountain is a summit in the U.S. state of Nevada. The elevation is 7,109 feet (2,167 m).

Bell Mountain most likely was named after Charles Bell, a mineral prospector.
