= Bell Mountain (San Bernardino County, California) =

Desert mountain in Southern California

- Location within California

Highest point
- Elevation: 3,897 ft (1,188 m) NGVD 29
- Coordinates: 34°34′58″N 117°13′01″W

Geography
- Location: San Bernardino County, California, U.S.
- Topo map: USGS Apple Valley North

Bell Mountain is a desert mountain located in the Mojave Desert in San Bernardino County of the US state of Southern California. It is located in Sidewinder Valley north of Apple Valley and northeast of Victorville. It has a summit and elevation of 3,897 feet (1,188 m). Located north of Bell Mountain is a dry stream that flows into the Mojave River known as the Bell Mountain Wash. It is a prominent feature that is easily recognizable with its unique bell-like shape.

Bell Mountain is composed of sediments that was deposited in an ancient ocean that was then capped with volcanic material. This volcanic material did not originate from the mountain or nearby sources but instead from distant sources. The volcanic materials created a cap for the underlying sediment from erosion leading to the mountains distinctive bell shape.
