= Pine Mountain (Schoharie County, New York) =

Mountain in New York, United States

- Location within New York Adirondack Park Location within the United States

Highest point
- Elevation: 1,942 feet (592 m)
- Coordinates: 42°21′59″N 74°27′43″W, 42°22′34″N 74°27′31″W

Geography
- Location: SSW of Gilboa, New York, U.S.
- Topo map(s): USGS Prattsville, Gilboa

Pine Mountain is a mountain in Schoharie County, New York. It is located south-southwest of Gilboa. Moore Hill is located northwest and Stevens Mountain is located northeast of Pine Mountain.
