= Palmer Hill =

Mountain in New York, United States

- Location within New York Adirondack Park Location within the United States

Highest point
- Elevation: 1,145 feet (349 m)
- Coordinates: 44°27′57″N 73°40′28″W

Geography
- Location: N of Au Sable Forks, Clinton County, New York, U.S.
- Topo map: USGS Au Sable Forks

Palmer Hill is a 1,145-foot-tall (349 m) mountain in the Adirondack Mountains region of New York. It is located north of the hamlet of Au Sable Forks in Clinton County. In 1930, the Conservation Department built a 60-foot-tall (18 m) steel fire lookout tower and an observer cabin on the summit. Due to increased use in aerial detection for fire lookout purposes, the tower ceased fire lookout operations in early 1971. It resumed fire watching operations from 1979 to 1988, before being officially closed in early 1989. The tower still remains, but is on private property and is not open to the public.

== History ==
In 1930, the Conservation Department built a 60-foot-tall (18 m) Aermotor LS40 tower and an observer cabin was built on the mountain and reporting 9 fires the first year. The tower on Palmer Hill was built to supplement the tower on Whiteface Mountain. The land around Palmer Hill is in an area where early spring and late fall fires are common. Due to the inability to operate the tower on Whiteface Mountain during these high fire periods, the fires frequently grew large in size before being reported by another tower farther away. Due to increased use in aerial detection for fire lookout purposes, the tower ceased fire lookout operations in early 1971. In 1979, the tower resumed fire lookout operations until closing at the end of the 1988 season. The tower was officially closed in early 1989, when the Department of Environmental Conservation determined that towers were no longer effective and decided to phase them out of service. The tower still remains, but is on private property and is not open to the public.
