= Adirondack Lake =

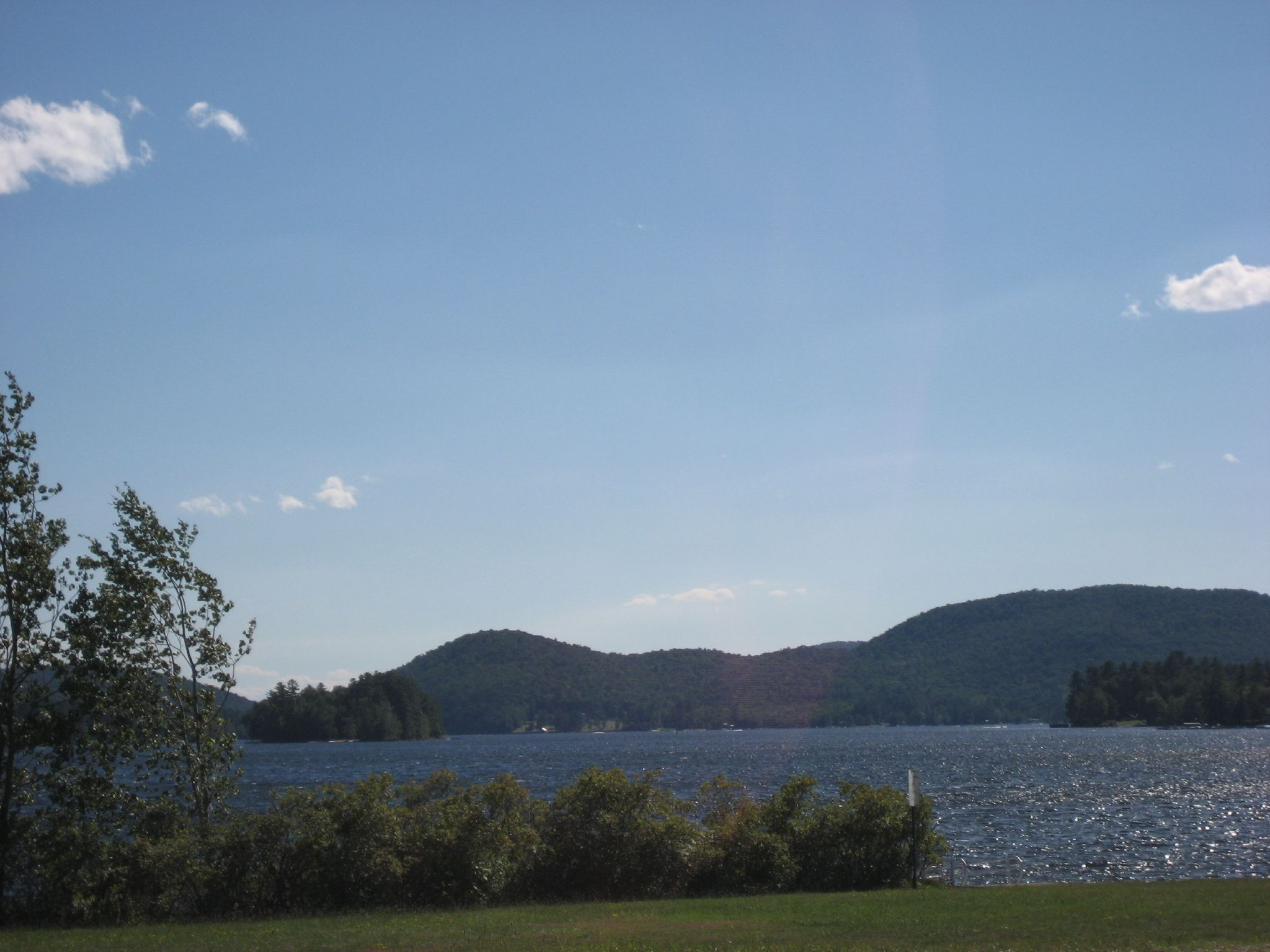
- Adirondack Lake

- Location within New York Adirondack Lake (the United States)
- Location: Hamilton County, New York, United States
- Coordinates: 43°47′21″N 74°15′36″W
- Type: Lake
- Primary outflows: Lake Abanakee
- Basin countries: United States
- Surface area: 192 acres (0.78 km^{2})
- Average depth: 7 feet (2.1 m)
- Max. depth: 19 feet (5.8 m)
- Shore length^{1}: 6.1 miles (9.8 km)
- Surface elevation: 1,660 feet (510 m)
- Islands: 9
- Settlements: Indian Lake, New York
- ^{1} Shore length is not a well-defined measure.

Adirondack Lake is located north of Indian Lake, New York. The outlet flows through a creek into Lake Abanakee. Fish species present in the lake are northern pike, white sucker, largemouth bass, black bullhead, yellow perch, rock bass, and pumpkinseed sunfish. There is a carry down on the southeast shore off NY-28 near the dam.
