= Tirrel Pond =

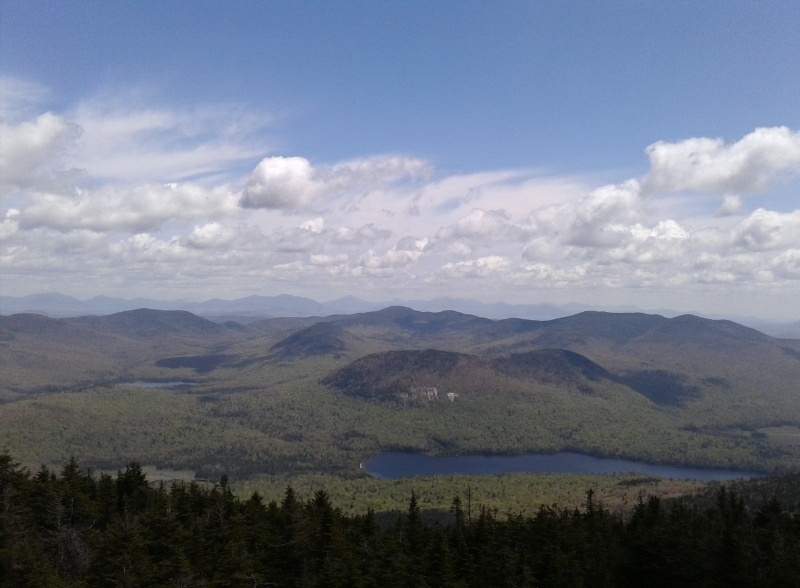
- Tirrel Pond with Tirrell Mountain located directly behind.

- Location within New York Tirrel Pond (the United States)
- Location: Hamilton County, New York
- Coordinates: 43°53′00″N 74°22′14″W, 43°53′03″N 74°22′30″W
- Type: Lake
- Basin countries: United States
- Surface area: 145 acres (0.59 km^{2})
- Surface elevation: 1,919 feet (585 m)
- Settlements: Blue Mountain Lake (hamlet)

Tirrel Pond is a lake located northeast of the Hamlet of Blue Mountain Lake, New York. Tirrell Mountain is located northeast and Blue Mountain is located west-southwest of the lake.
