= Lake Durant =

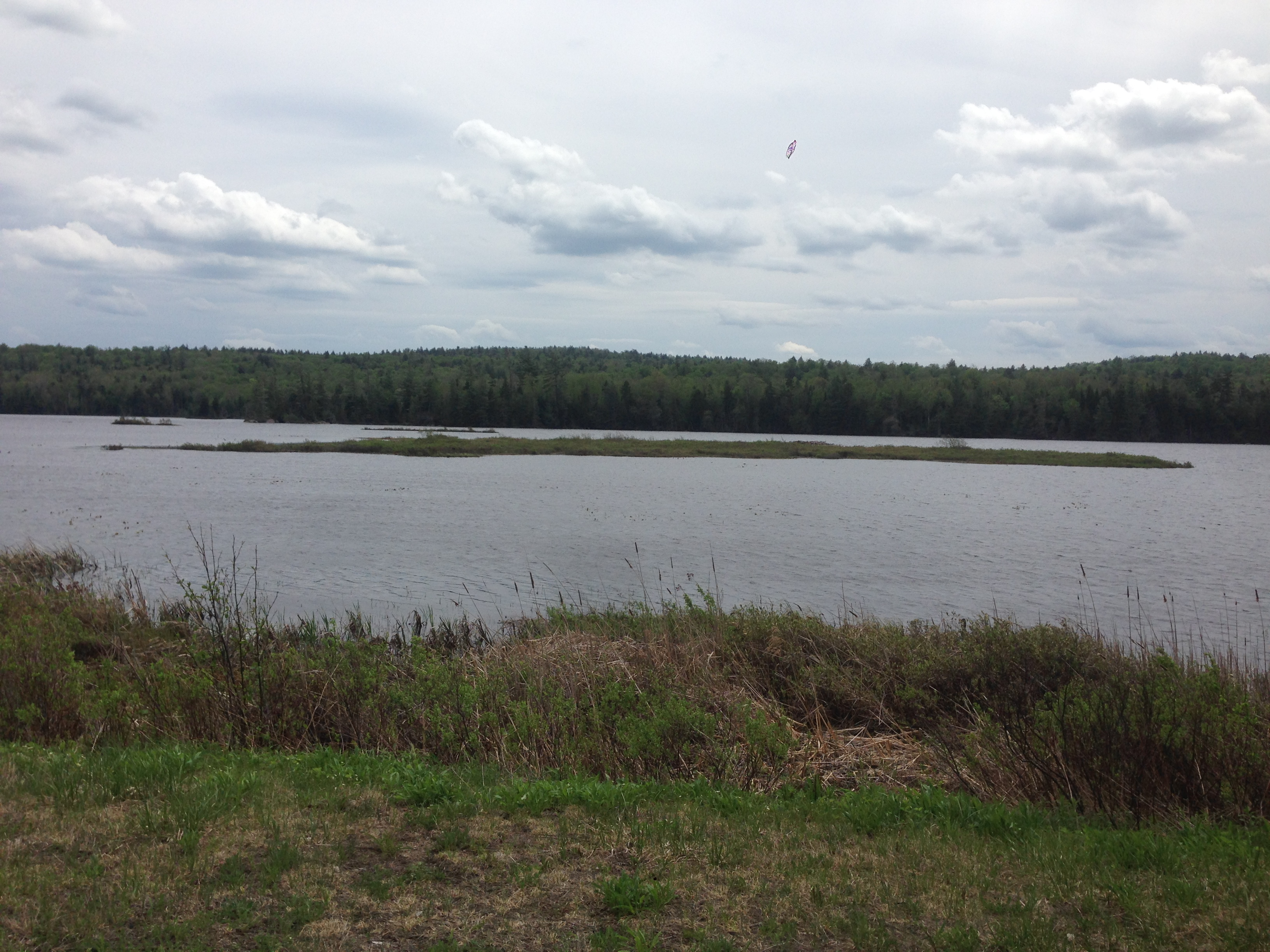
- Lake Durant from NY 28/30

- Location within New York Lake Durant (the United States)
- Location: Hamilton County, New York
- Coordinates: 43°50′30″N 74°24′29″W
- Type: Lake
- Primary inflows: Rock Lake
- Primary outflows: Rock River
- Basin countries: United States
- Surface area: 327 acres (1.32 km^{2})
- Max. depth: 20 feet (6.1 m)
- Shore length^{1}: 5.5 miles (8.9 km)
- Surface elevation: 1,768 feet (539 m)
- Islands: 10
- Settlements: Blue Mountain Lake, New York
- ^{1} Shore length is not a well-defined measure.

Lake Durant is located 3 miles east of Blue Mountain Lake, New York. It has an area of 289 acres and an elevation of 1769 feet. Fish species present in the lake are largemouth bass, smallmouth bass, tiger muskie, black bullhead, yellow perch, and pumpkinseed sunfish. There is a state owned hard surface ramp on NY-28/NY-30, 3 miles east of Blue Mountain Lake in the campground. There is a day use fee.
