= Round Pond (Indian Lake, Hamilton County, New York) =

Lake in northern New York State, U.S.

- Location within New York Round Pond (the United States)
- Location: Hamilton County, New York, U.S.
- Coordinates: 43°40′36″N 74°15′14″W
- Type: Lake
- Basin countries: United States
- Surface area: 141 acres (0.57 km^{2})
- Average depth: 7 feet (2.1 m)
- Max. depth: 11 feet (3.4 m)
- Shore length^{1}: 2.3 miles (3.7 km)
- Surface elevation: 1,857 feet (566 m)
- Settlements: Indian Lake, New York
- ^{1} Shore length is not a well-defined measure.

Round Pond is a lake located south of Indian Lake, New York. Fish species present in the lake are brown trout, black bullhead, sunfish, and white sucker. Access to the lake via trail from Big Brook Road. No motors are allowed on this lake.
