= Round Pond (Old Forge, New York) =

- Location of Round Pond within New York
- Location: Herkimer County, New York
- Coordinates: 43°44′17″N 74°58′20″W
- Type: Lake
- Basin countries: United States
- Surface area: 7 acres (2.8 ha)
- Surface elevation: 1,719 ft (524 m)
- Settlements: Old Forge

Round Pond is a small lake north of Old Forge in Herkimer County, New York. It drains southwest via an unnamed creek which flows into the North Branch Moose River.

== See also ==
- List of lakes in New York
