= Peaked Mountain (Massachusetts) =

Nature reserve in Massachusetts, United States

Coordinates: 42°2′48″N 72°20′23″W

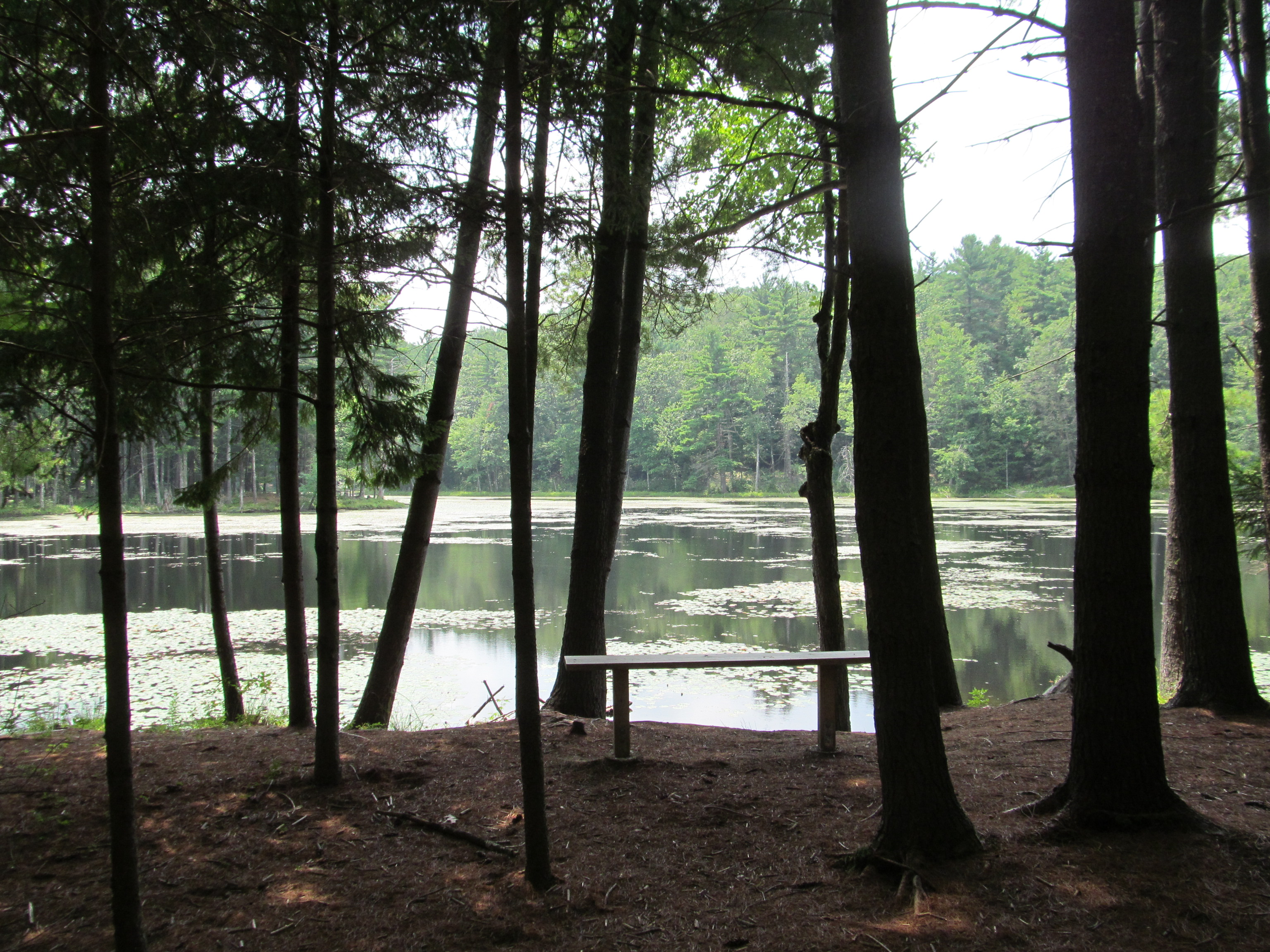
Lunden Pond

Peaked Mountain (pronounced pea-kid) is a nature reserve located in Monson, Massachusetts. The property is approximately 2,000 acres (8.1 km^{2}) and is owned by The Trustees of Reservations, a non-profit conservation organization. The principal landowners of its western slope, Leonard and Roslyn Harrington and Richard Elliott, have long permitted the public to hike through their properties to the summit. Concerned about the mountain's future, they sought the assistance of The Trustees of Reservations in developing a long-term strategy for protecting the mountain and securing public access after their lifetimes.

== Site description ==
Peaked Mountain is the highest point on a north-south ridge extending well into Connecticut, and lies at the heart of an extensive natural area that has remained mostly undeveloped. The mountain and its surroundings boast an impressive diversity of habitats, including forests of various deciduous/evergreen compositions, rocky outcrops, ponds, streams, marshes, and beaver swamps. From the 1,227-foot (374 m) summit of Peaked Mountain, a panoramic view unfolds taking in Connecticut's Shenipsit State Forest to the south, Mount Monadnock to the north, and Mount Wachusett to the northeast. In between lies a sweep of rolling New England countryside with forested hills and ridges, valley farms, and small villages. The Valley view overlook provides views of nearby Boulder Hill and the City of Springfield, Massachusetts to the west.

== History ==
An 1830 map of the area indicated that the area was cleared except for the summit and ridgeline; thus, the higher elevations of Peaked Mountain may represent "primary" forest. Historically, there was a 360-degree view from the summit. The top of the mountain was used for charcoal production, which likely ceased by 1900 or soon after. As the forests returned after 1900, they were subjected to wildfires that swept the mountain periodically. The last significant fire occurred in 1984 when 200 acres (0.81 km^{2}) burned. The most recent fire occurred on March 4, 2000 when approximately 500 sq ft (46 m^{2}).

Due to the steep and rocky conditions on Peaked Mt. agriculture including grazing may have been restricted to the lower and/or mid slopes.

The pond was originally dammed by the Lunden family in 1918.

Parts of the mountain were planted with plantations of exotic conifers (e.g. red pine).

Limited cutting for firewood and timber had been allowed on the mountain. In 1986, there were 130,000 board feet (310 m^{3}) removed from 70 acres (280,000 m^{2}) on the western slope. Another 85,000 board feet (200 m^{3}) were removed from the Miller Forest Tract in 1996. Small quantities are removed annually for firewood by the Harringtons and Elliots on the Peaked Mountain Tract.

Peaked Mountain itself has been open to the public for passive recreation since 1984. Peaked Mt. Co-op formed in 1984 in response to forest fire concerns.

Gifts and purchases from the Harrington, Elliott, and Miller families transferred management to The Trustees of Reservations in 1999.

Road Names

- Ruth's Mountain Road is named for Ruth Elliott, Dick's late wife. Ruth was very interested in wildlife, land preservation and country living.
- Bernie Avenue is named for Bernie Choiniere, Dick's nephew. He tagged the trees to mark the route when the road was built.
- Roslyn's Turnpike is named for Roslyn Harrington, who conceived the Co-op and plotted the route which was built in three stages.
- Kevin's Road is named for Bernie's son who helped with some forest thinning in the area.
- Skid Row was the route used by a logging skidder during a conservative timber harvest on the Harrington and Elliott property.

== The Peaked Mountain Co-op ==
The Co-op emerged in the aftermath of the Peaked Mountain fire that burned over 200 acres (0.81 km^{2}) in 1984. As the fire-fighters were struggling to get hoses, pumps, and other equipment up the steep logging trail, Roslyn Harrington suggested to her husband, that they, with the help of some neighbors, should create a better road system as a defense to future conflagrations. This proposal called into being the Peaked Mt Co-op, composed of Len Harrington, Dick Elliott, a neighbor and Peaked Mt. landowner, and Bernie Choiniere, Dick's nephew and local resident. Their goal was to build an adequate system of access roads. The members decided that the land should finance the costs of the system being built for its benefit.

With that in mind, they decided to cut the trees themselves. So they resolved to start a firewood business, using the proceeds from the sale of trees to make the roads to pay for hired equipment, and for equipment owned and used by the Co-op.

Each year the Peaked Mountain Co-op harvests 40 cords (140 m^{3}) of firewood. Most of the wood is sold to steady customers largely in the outer suburbs of Boston. The firewood is harvested in the winter and cut into lengths of 4 feet (1.2 m), stacked for drying, and then cut into appropriate sizes for each customer. Several years ago, the Co-op harvested 131,000 board feet (310 m^{3}) of saw timber. The trees mostly consist of oak, black birch, and red maple which are selectively cut with the intention of giving greater space to the remaining trees and thus improve their growth rate.

Another important project undertaken by the Co-op is the construction of the fire pond, located part way up the mountain. This project insures that should there ever be another fire on the mountain not only will the equipment be able to get on site, but water will be at hand. In an area cleared for a logging yard, the Co-op recently started an orchard with apple and pear trees.

== Ecology and geology ==
The reservation supports a wide variety of community types and habitats due to the great variations in topography, soil types, and land use history. Plant communities include oak forests and rock outcrop communities on the west facing mountain slope and summit of Peaked Mountain; various pine/oak forests and wetlands communities are found on the more level, lower elevations to the west of Butler Road. The north/south ridge line supports extensive deciduous forests. The dominant forest type of the upper slopes is dry mixed oak which has been influenced by fire over the past 75 years, An acid rock outcrop community and associated scrub-oak community is found in various stages of successional development on and around the summit. The forest on the lower portions of the mountain is more mixed with black birch, red maple and sugar maple, and occasionally hemlock and non-native conifers. Near the base of the mountain there is a hay field.

Much of the area, especially the slopes, is covered with glacial till that overlies bedrock and glacial outwash with associated sand and gravel deposits fill in the lower elevations. Soils throughout the reservation are described as strongly acidic to moderately acidic, sandy loam and are typically well to excessively drained except where ground water accumulates creating wetlands. Soil depths around the summit are thin.

== Recreation ==
There are 3.5 miles (5.6 km) of forest roads on Peaked Mountain. The ascent from the main entrance to the summit is a gradual, 467-foot (142 m) gain in elevation that is strenuous in places and takes 45 minutes. There is also a one-mile (1.6 km) woodland trail looping around Lunden pond; easy walking. Common visitor activities include local walkers and hikers, some with dogs; horseback riding, mountain biking, bird watching, nature enjoyment, cross country skiing and snowshoeing in the winter months. The area offers great potential for interpretation of land use history, including frontier farms, millponds, and charcoal production for the early iron industry.
