= Blue Mountain Lake (hamlet), New York =

Blue Mountain Lake, New York
- Hamlet
- Location within the state of New York
- Coordinates: 43°51′09″N 74°28′16″W
- Country: United States
- State: New York
- County: Hamilton
- Town: Indian Lake
- Elevation: 1,824 ft (556 m)
- Time zone: UTC-5 (Eastern (EST))
  - Summer (DST): UTC-4 (EDT)
- ZIP code: 12812
- Area code: 518

Blue Mountain Lake is a scenic hamlet in the town of Indian Lake of Hamilton County, New York, United States, at the intersection of New York Routes 28, 28N and 30. Blue Mountain Lake also refers to the lake on the banks of which the hamlet is situated. Blue Mountain Lake is approximately 90 miles (140 km) north of Utica and about 90 miles (140 km) northwest of Albany. The place is named after the mountain peak, Blue Mountain.

The principal outdoor attractions include camping, boating and hiking, supported by the several guest lodges in the area - at least one of which features and actively promotes the absence of televisions, telephones and radios in their rooms. The Adirondack Museum is located just outside the hamlet of Blue Mountain Lake, within walking distance east on Route 30. The Adirondack Lakes Center for the Arts provides year-round theatre and music performances, art galleries, workshops and classes.

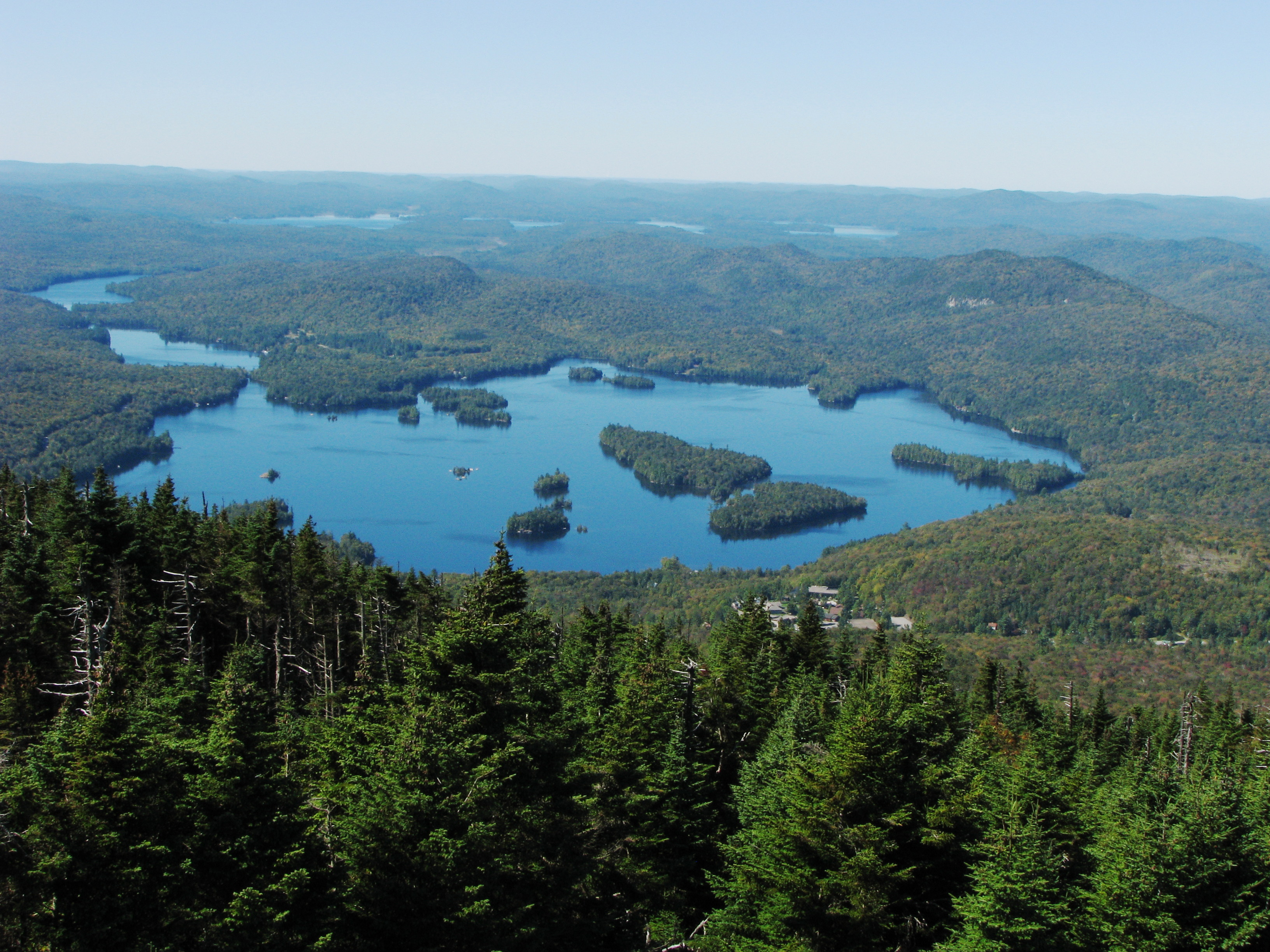
Blue Mountain Lake in New York

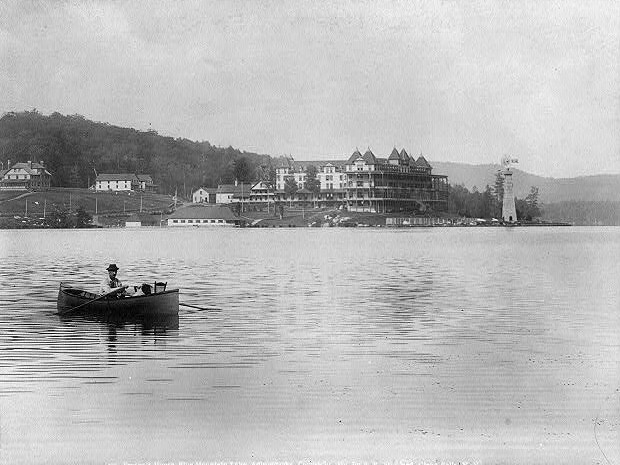
Prospect House, Blue Mountain Lake, 1889 Seneca Ray Stoddard

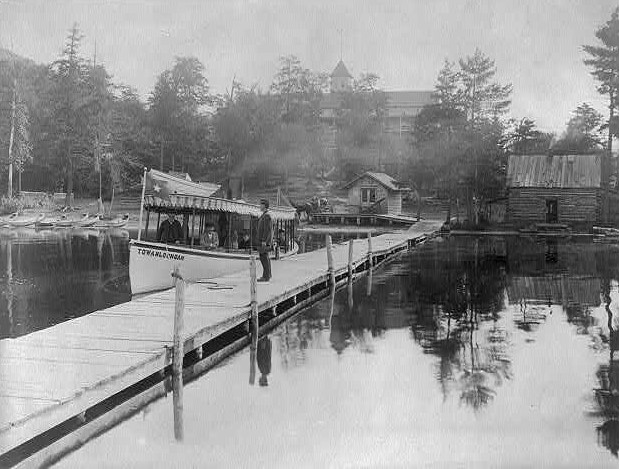
The small steamboat Towahloondah, 1889, S R Stoddard

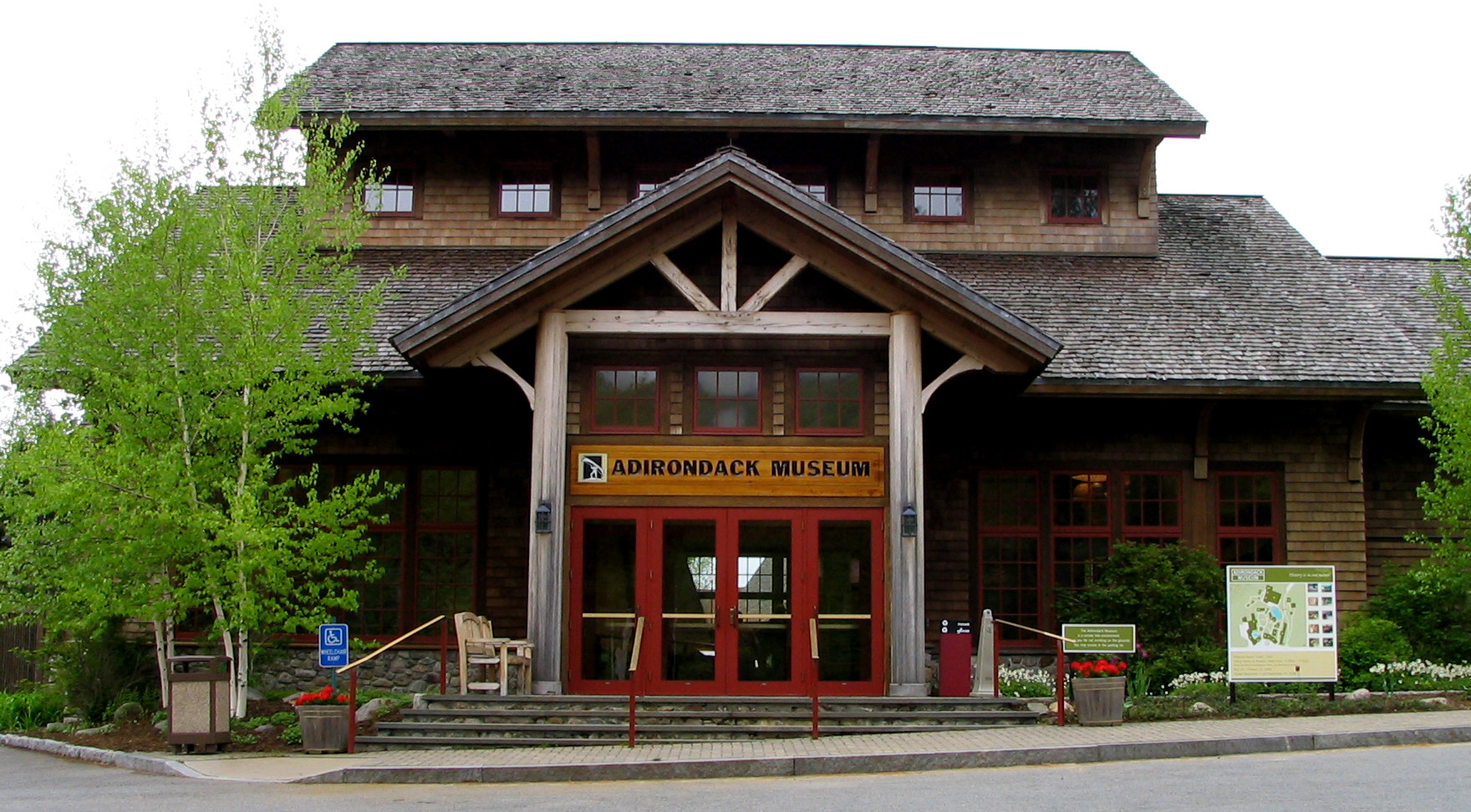
Entrance to the Adirondack Museum
