= Indian Lake (hamlet), New York =

Indian Lake, New York
- Hamlet
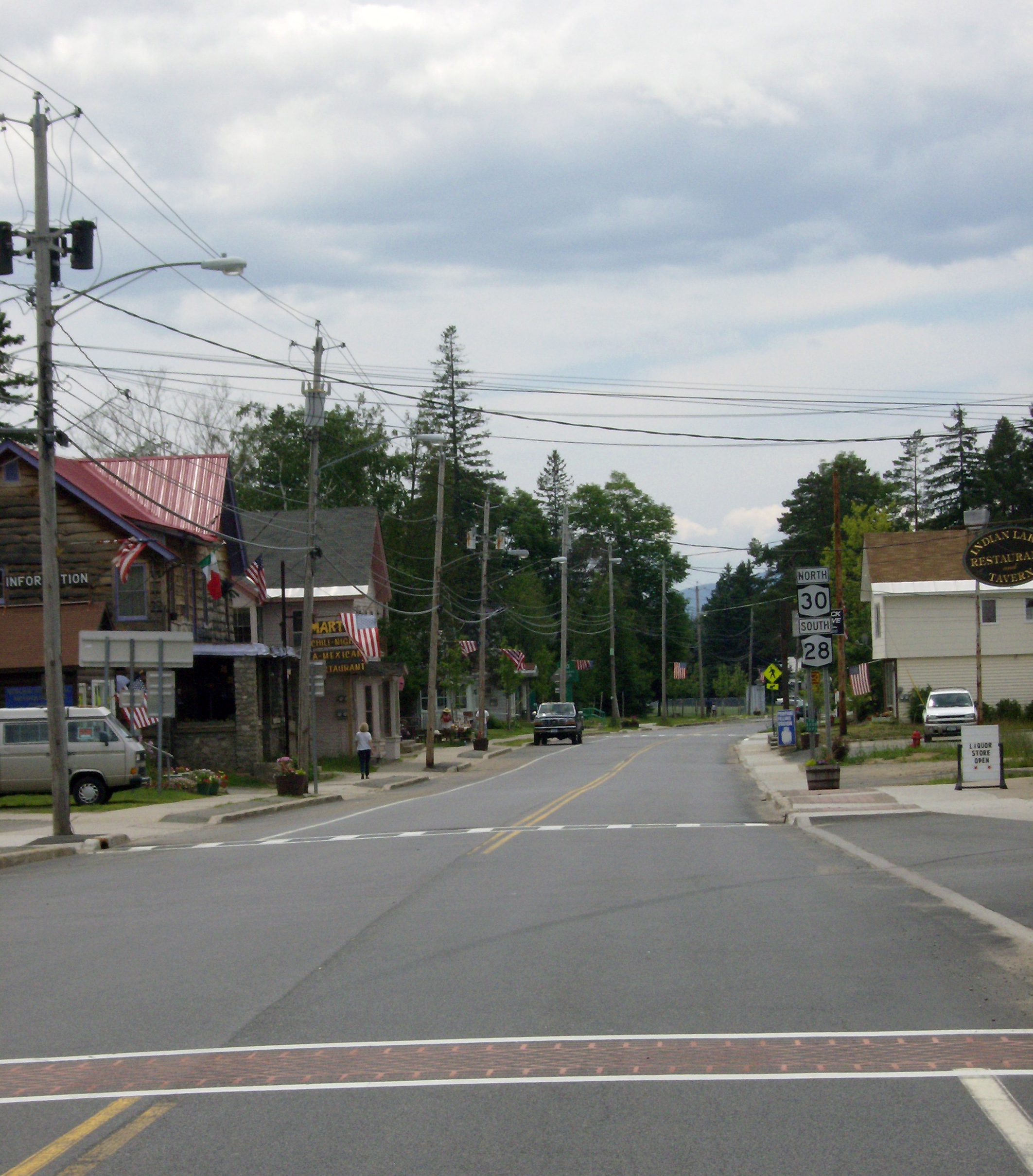
- NY 28 and 30 running through Indian Lake

- Location within New York Location within the United States
- Coordinates: 43°46′57″N 74°16′19″W
- Country: United States
- State: New York
- County: Hamilton
- Town: Indian Lake
- Elevation: 1,742 ft (531 m)
- Time zone: UTC-5 (Eastern (EST))
  - Summer (DST): UTC-4 (EDT)
- ZIP code: 12842

Indian Lake is a hamlet located in the Town of Indian Lake in Hamilton County, New York, United States. Adirondack Lake is located northeast of the hamlet and Indian Lake is located south of the hamlet. NY 28 and NY 30 run through the hamlet.

Indian Lake has a post office with zip code 12842, located at 6316 State Highway 30. The Indian Lake Central School is located here at 28 West Main Street.
