= Moose (disambiguation) =

The moose is the largest member of the deer family.

Moose may also refer to:

== People ==
- Moose (surname), a list of persons with the name
- Moose (nickname), a list of persons with the nickname
- Moose Harris (born 1967), British bass player
- Moose (wrestler) (born 1984), American professional wrestler and football player
- Moose (graffiti artist), pseudonym of Paul Curtis
- Moose, ring name of American female professional wrestler Mickie Knuckles

== Places ==
- Moose, Wyoming, an unincorporated community
- Moose Brook (New Hampshire)
- Moose Falls, a waterfall in Yellowstone National Park, Wyoming
- Moose Island, Maine
- Moose Lake (disambiguation), a listing of places by this name
- Moose Mountain (disambiguation), various peaks in the United States and Canada
- Moose Pass, Alaska
- Moose Pond, Maine
- Moose River (disambiguation), various rivers in the United States and Canada

== Science and technology ==
- MOOSE, a proposed emergency "bail-out" system to bring a single astronaut down from orbit
- Quiver diagram, known to particle physicists as a moose
- Murphy Moose, a homebuilt light utility aircraft

=== Software ===
- Moose (Perl), an alternative object system for Perl 5
- Moose (analysis), a platform for software and data analysis
- MOOSE (software), an open source object oriented C++ multiphysics framework developed at Idaho National Laboratory
- Moose File System, an open-source distributed file system

== Arts ==
- Moose (band), an English indie rock band from the early 1990s
- Moose (dog), a dog actor who played Eddie on the American sitcom Frasier
- Moose, character played by John Travolta in the 2019 film The Fanatic
- Moose A. Moose, the main character in the short-form television series Moose and Zee
- "The Moose" (M*A*S*H), an episode of the television comedy M*A*S*H
- Moose (W-02-03), a 2003 sculpture in Chicago, Illinois
- Moose: Chapters from My Life, a 2013 autobiography of songwriter Robert B. Sherman
- Moose Mason, a character from the Archie Comics series

== Sports teams ==
- Toronto Canada Moose, a Canadian junior ice hockey team
- Maine Moose, a Junior "A" ice hockey team
- Manitoba Moose, an ice hockey team in the American Hockey League
- Michigan Moose, a former ice hockey team in the All American Hockey League (2010–2011)
- Trenton Moose, a 1930s basketball team based in Trenton, New Jersey

== Radio station branding ==
- Moose FM, a brand used by nine radio stations in Ontario
- KMMS-FM, a radio station in Bozeman, Montana
- WBRV-FM, a radio station in Boonville, New York
- WLLG, sister station to WBRV, in Lowville, New York
- WCEN, a radio station in Mount Pleasant, Michigan
- WMUS, a radio station in Muskegon, Michigan

== Other uses ==
- USS Moose, the name of several U.S. Navy ships
- Moose International, the Loyal Order of Moose
- Moose (sternwheeler), a steamboat that operated on the Willamette River
- Yakovlev Yak-11, a trainer aircraft

== See also ==
- Letsgomoose
- Mouse (disambiguation)
- Mousse (disambiguation)
- Moosie Drier, stage name of American actor Gary Drier (born 1964)
