= Mouse (disambiguation) =

A mouse is a small rodent.

Mouse may also refer to:

== People ==
- Mouse (nickname)
- Stanley Mouse (born 1940), American artist also known simply as "Mouse"

== Fictional characters ==
- Mickey Mouse, a cartoon character from Walt Disney Animation Studios
- Minnie Mouse, a cartoon character from Walt Disney Animation Studios
- Mouse (Alice's Adventures in Wonderland), a character in Lewis Carroll's 1865 novel
- Mouse (The Matrix), a crew member of the Nebuchadnezzar in The Matrix franchise
- Mouse, a dog in the novel series The Dresden Files, introduced in Blood Rites (2004)
- Mouse, from the 1994-2001 TV series ReBoot
- Jerry Mouse, a cartoon character from Hanna-Barbera
- Jill "Mouse" Chen of The Carrie Diaries

== Science and technology ==
- Computer mouse, a pointing device
- Mouse (programming language)
- Mouse (set theory)
- Mouse (software), a hydrological engineering software program
- Comper Mouse, a British monoplane, of which one was built in 1933
- Mouse Computer Co., a Japanese PC & laptop manufacturing brand, part of MCJ (company)

== Animals ==
- Marsupial mouse, smaller members of Dasyuridae
- Sea mouse
- Typical mice, of the genus Mus
- Kangaroo mouse
- Brush mouse
- Field mice, genus Apodemus
  - Wood mouse
  - Yellow-necked mouse
- Large Mindoro forest mouse
- Florida mouse
- Big-eared hopping mouse
- Luzon montane forest mouse
- Forrest's mouse
- Pebble-mound mouse
- Golden mouse
- Bolam's mouse
- Harvest mouse (disambiguation)

== Other uses ==
- "The Mouse", a common nickname for the Walt Disney Company, after the company mascot Mickey Mouse
- Mouse (bull), or Ratón (2001–2013), a Spanish fighting bull
- Mouse (2012 film), a Sri Lankan film
- Mouse (2026 film), an American coming-of-age drama film
- Mouse (G.I. Joe), a character in the short-lived Sgt. Savage and his Screaming Eagles toy line
- Mouse (manga), also adapted into an anime series
- Mouse (shackle), a safety wire attached to a shackle
- Mouse (TV series), a 2021 South Korean television series
- Mouse Island, Bermuda
- Mouse Island, Ohio
- Mouse Tower, a stone tower in Germany
- The Mouse, a film directed by Daniel Adams
- Making Opportunities for Upgrading Schools and Education, a youth development organization
- Stay mouse, part of a sailing vessel's standing rigging
- Mouse: P.I. for Hire, 2026 video game

== See also ==
- Mouse's case, a landmark 1608 English law judgment
- Mouse variety (disambiguation)
- Mice (disambiguation)
- Mousse (disambiguation)
- Maus (disambiguation)
- Mus (disambiguation)
