= Broadway Tunnel (San Francisco) =

Road underpass in San Francisco, California, U.S.

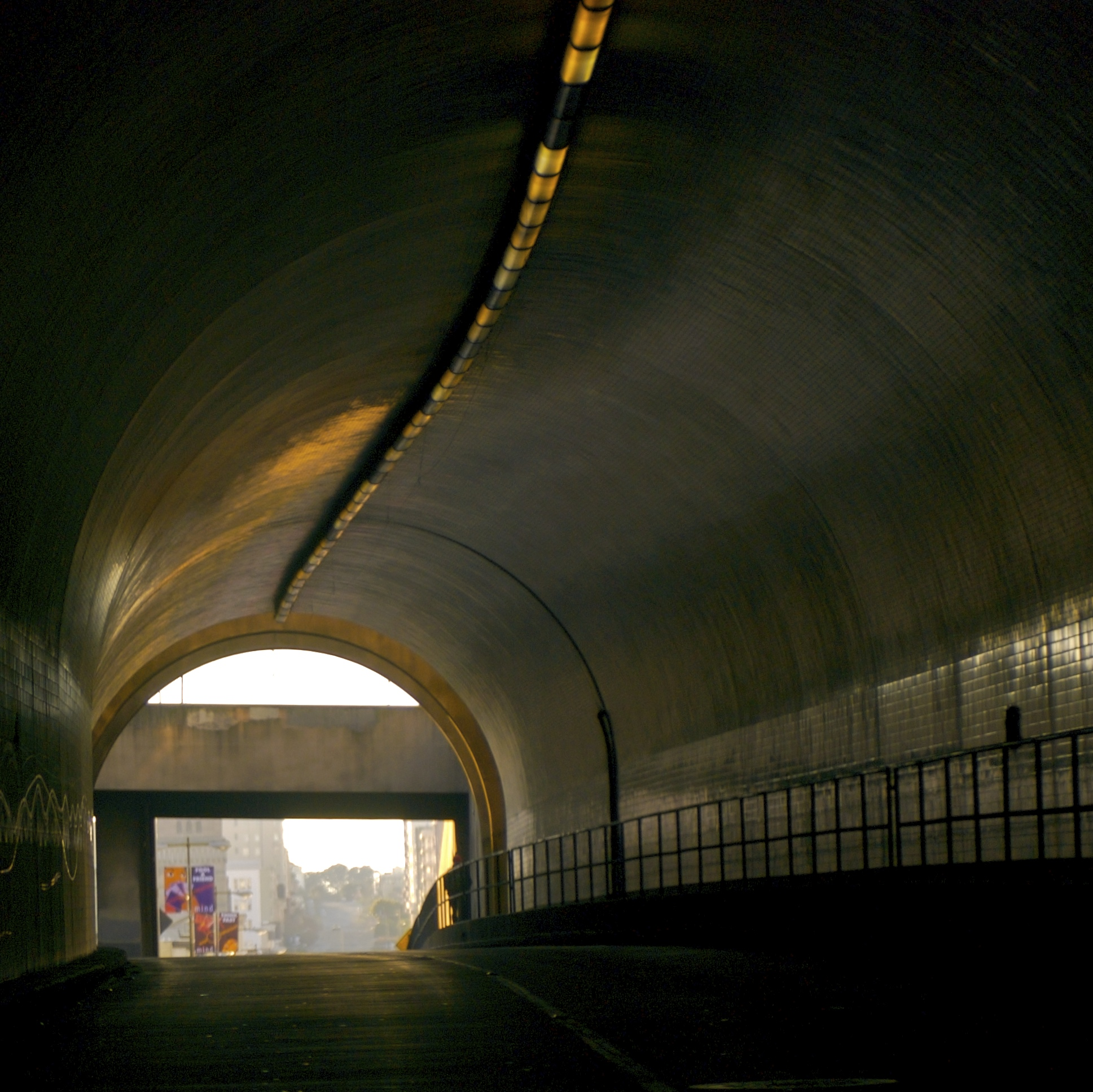
- Western portal, from inside the north tunnel, facing west
- Interactive map of Broadway Tunnel

Overview
- Location: San Francisco, California
- Coordinates: 37.796812°N 122.414893°W
- Route: Broadway
- Start: Between Powell and Mason Streets
- End: Between Hyde and Larkin Streets

Operation
- Work began: May 1, 1950
- Opened: December 21, 1952; 73 years ago
- Owner: City of San Francisco
- Operator: City of San Francisco
- Traffic: Automotive and pedestrian

Technical
- Length: 1,616 ft (493 m)
- No. of lanes: 4
- Operating speed: 40 mph (64 km/h)
- Tunnel clearance: 13.5 ft (4.1 m)

The Broadway Tunnel (officially the Robert C. Levy Tunnel) is a roadway tunnel in San Francisco, California. The tunnel opened in 1952, and serves as a high-capacity conduit for traffic between Chinatown and North Beach to the east and Russian Hill and Van Ness Avenue to the west. In a proposal of the city's 1948 Trafficways Plan, the tunnel was to serve as a link between the Embarcadero Freeway and the Central Freeway.

== History ==
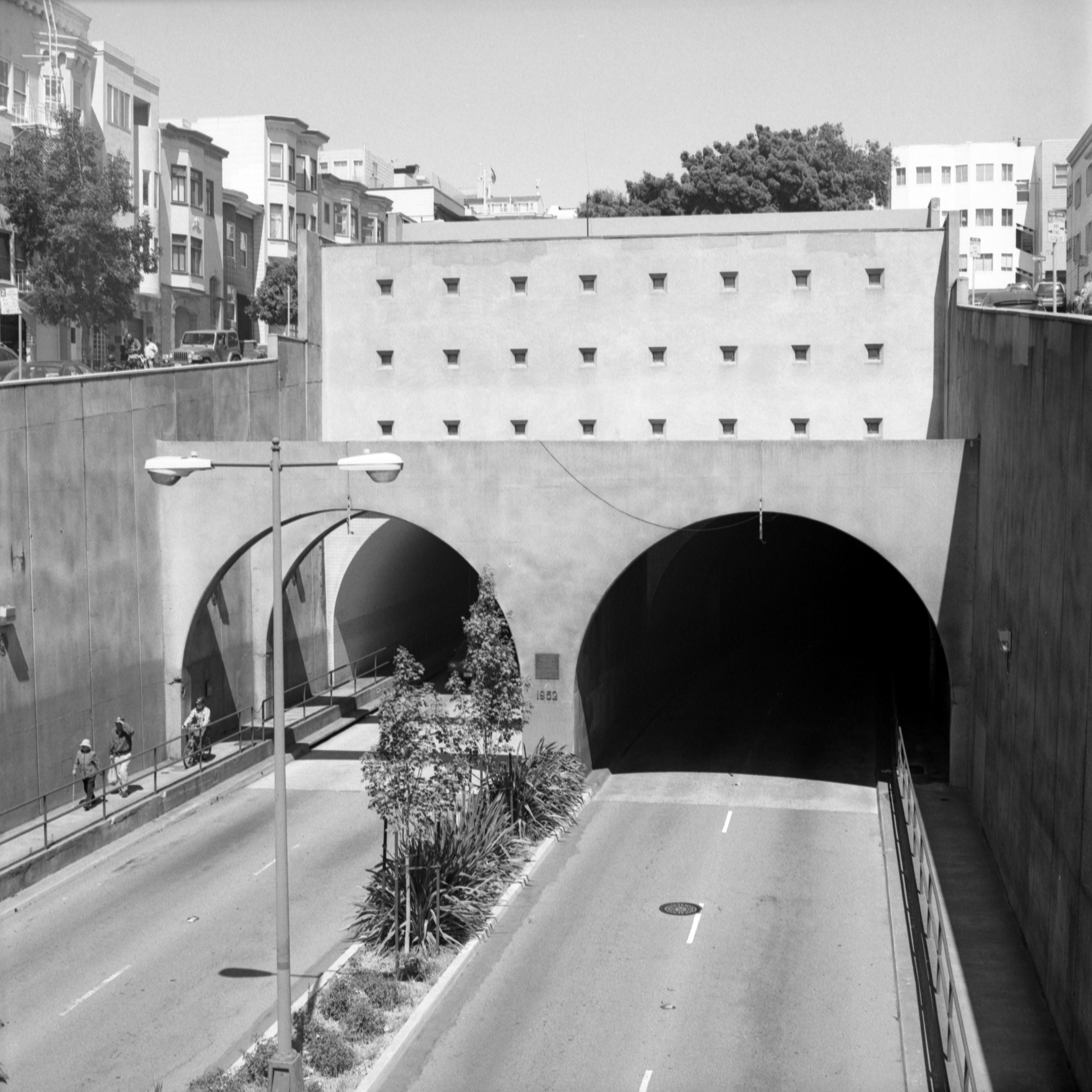
Western portal, from the Hyde Street overpass

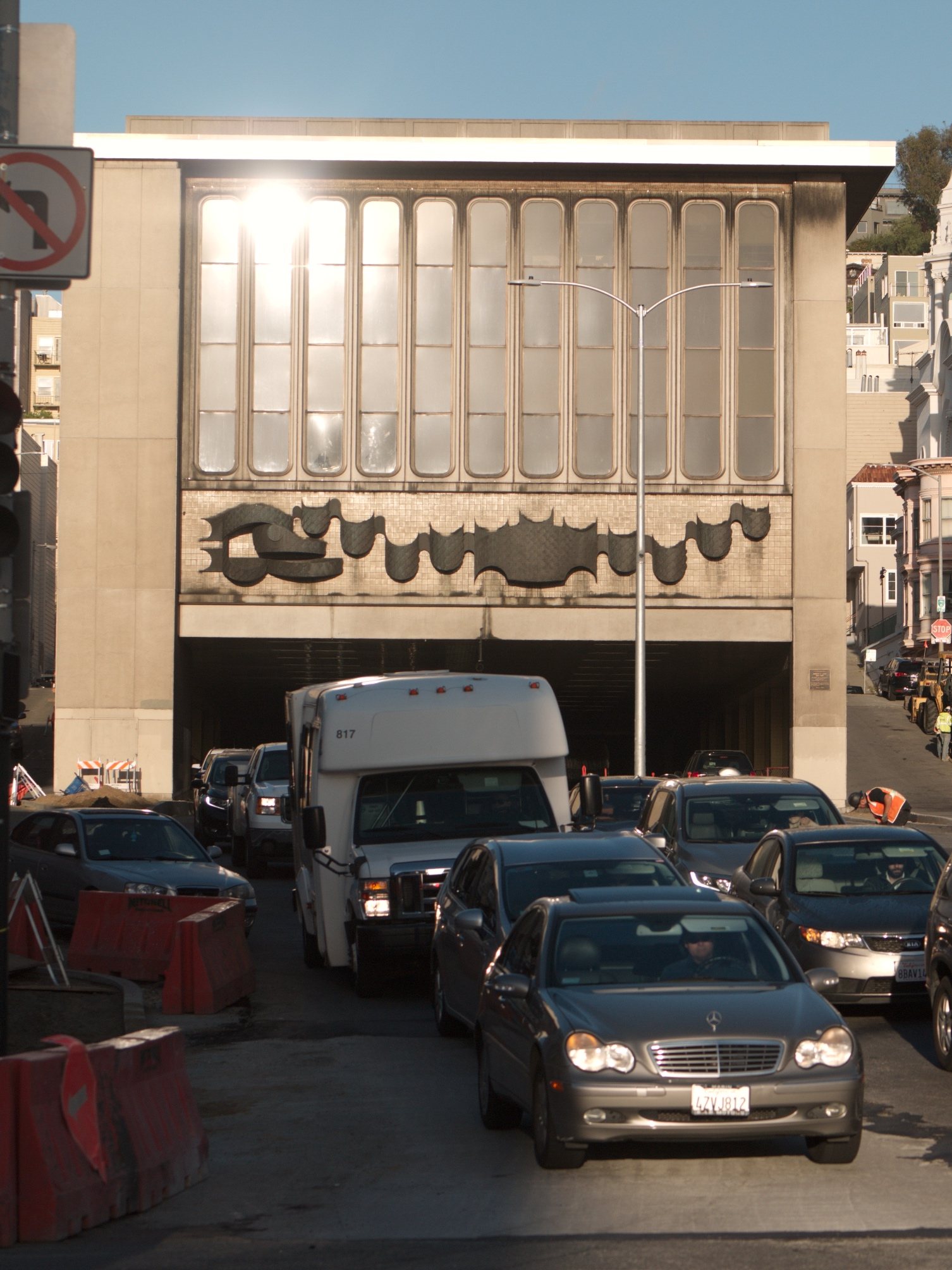
Eastern portal

=== Early plans ===
Abner Doble (grandfather of the namesake who would go on to build steam-powered cars) and his associates in the Folsom St. and Fort Point Railroad and Tunnel Co. were granted "the right to construct a tunnel through Russian Hill, on the line of Broadway, from Mason to Hyde or Larkin" by the California State Assembly on April 22, 1863.

Fifty years later, Bion J. Arnold submitted a report to the City of San Francisco in March 1913, calling for a tunnel on Broadway to supplement the Stockton Street Tunnel, which was already under construction. The general route of a tunnel for Broadway was described in April 1913, extending from Mason to Larkin. A landowner protested against the proposed tunnel, calling it "absolutely as unnecessary as a bridge to the moon". Also in 1913, a railway tunnel was proposed for Broadway as part of an extension for the Municipal Railway to carry passengers to and from the Panama-Pacific Exposition. Arnold's proposal called for a combined rail and road tunnel with a single arch for Broadway through Russian Hill, 2,338 feet (713 m) long and 60 feet (18 m) wide, carrying two tracks each 11 feet (3.4 m) wide; three lanes of traffic 24 feet (7.3 m) wide in total; and two sidewalks each 7 feet (2.1 m) wide.

Plans were elaborated in brief by City Engineer M.M. O'Shaughnessy as one of ten potential tunnel projects in San Francisco at the October 1917 meeting for the San Francisco Association of the members of the American Society of Civil Engineers. O'Shaughnessy proposed a 2,300-foot-long (700 m) bore, but the article reporting the meeting described it as merely "investigated and not likely to be soon built".

Robert C Levy (Broadway) Tunnel in San Francisco
1 Western portal
2 Eastern portal

=== Construction ===
In 1948, voters in the City of San Francisco passed a $5 million bond measure (equivalent to $52 million in 2024) to fund the construction of the Broadway Tunnel. Site preparations, including the move of an apartment building from 1453 Mason to Vallejo Street, were underway by October 1949, and the construction contract was anticipated to be bid in January 1950. In February, Morrison-Knudsen was awarded the contract after submitting the low bid of $5,243,355 (equivalent to $54.1 million in 2024) and construction began in May 1950. The final cost was some $7.3 million (equivalent to $69 million in 2024).

Completion was originally projected for May 1952, but unanticipated loose rock meant that shoring was required. The tunnel opened to traffic on December 21, 1952. Mayor Elmer Robinson cut a ceremonial ribbon to mark the occasion.

=== Dedication and later years ===
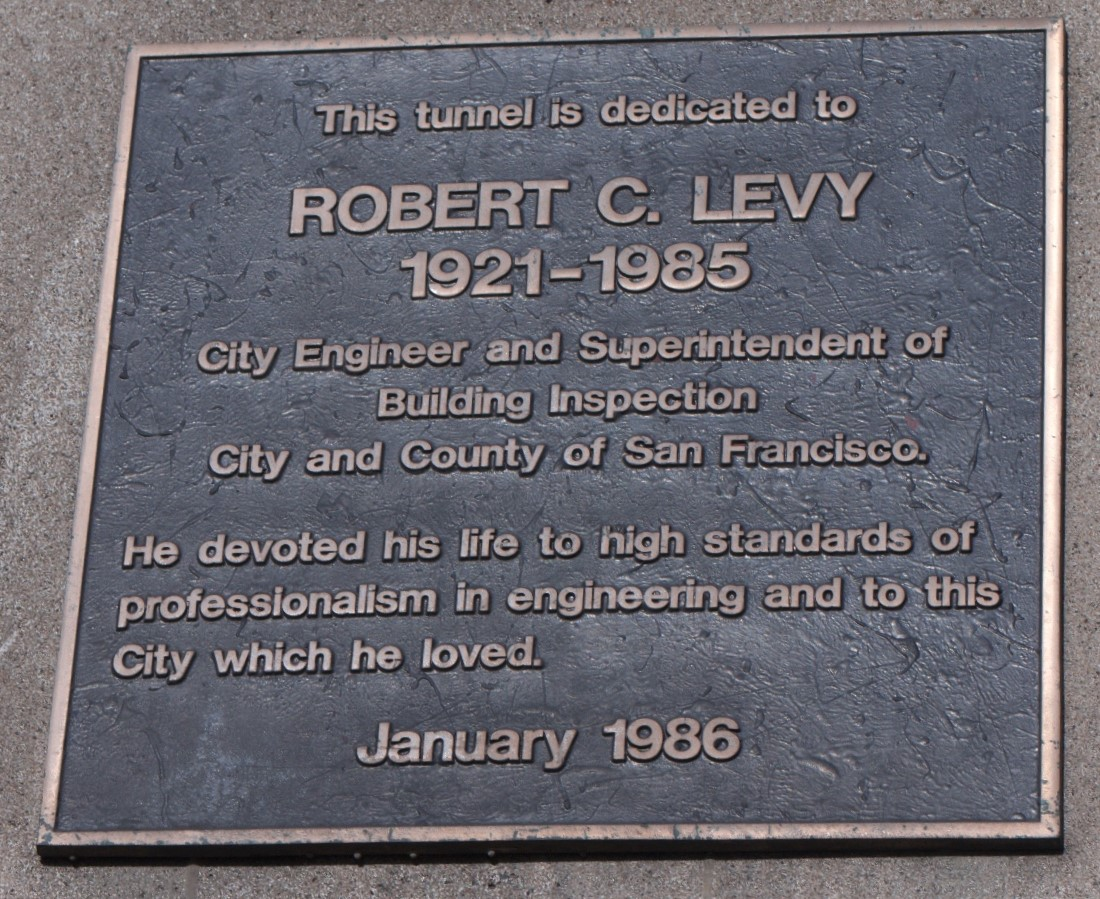
Dedication plaque

The Broadway Tunnel was named in honor of Robert C. Levy (1921–1985) in January 1986. Levy was the city engineer and superintendent of building inspection for the City and County of San Francisco. A plaque outside the tunnel reads, "He devoted his life to high standards of professionalism in engineering and to the City which he loved."

== Design ==
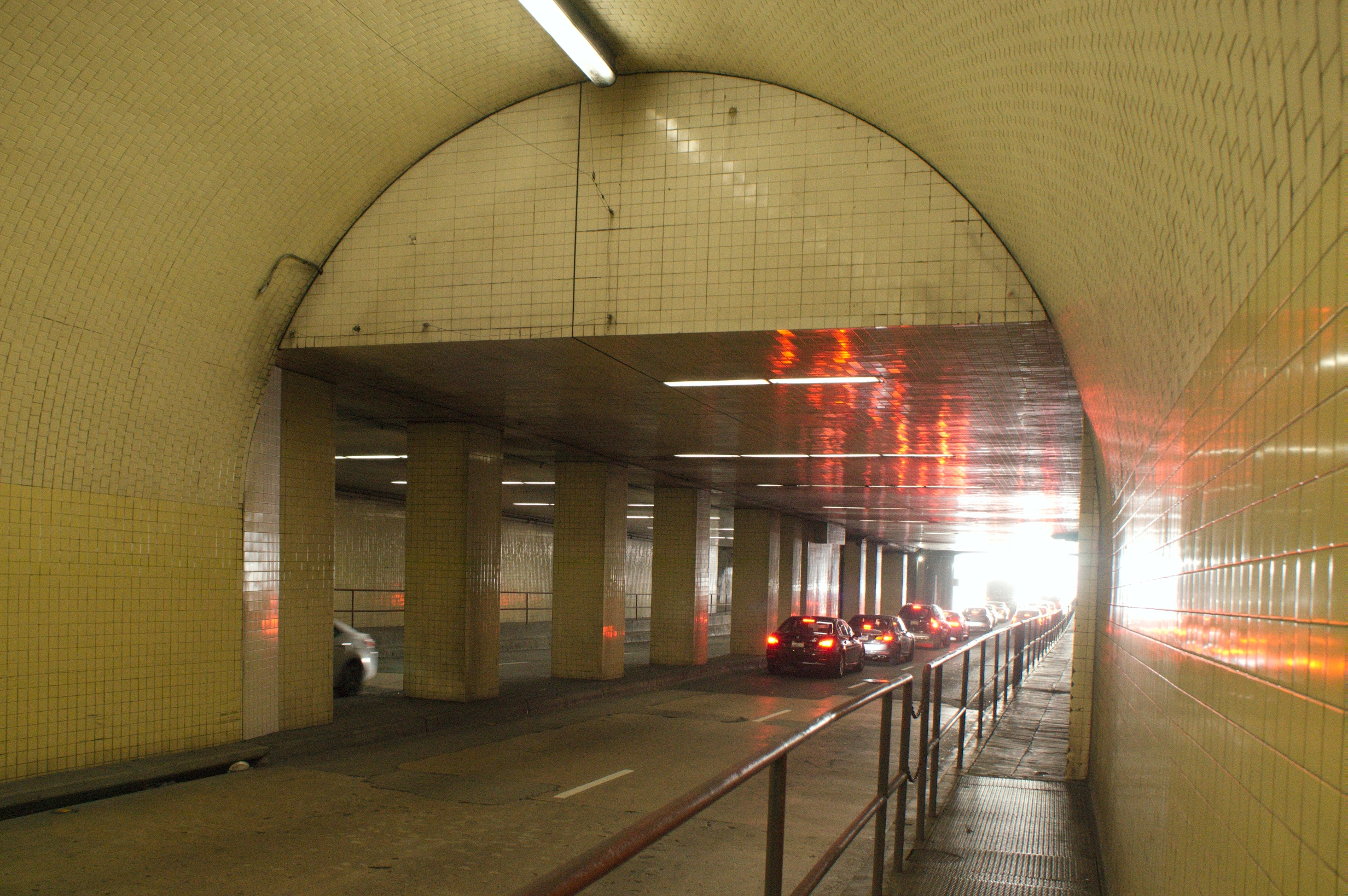
Eastbound tunnel, facing east. The large overhang is above.

The east portal is just east of the Mason Street overpass. The west portal is just east of the Hyde Street overpass. Combined with these two overpasses, the tunnel provides for uninterrupted traffic flow along Broadway for a stretch of six blocks, between Powell on the east and Larkin on the west. There are two bores, each carrying two lanes of one-way traffic. The northern tunnel carries westbound traffic, and the southern tunnel carries eastbound traffic. Each tunnel is 1,616 feet (493 m) long.

The vertical clearance throughout much of the tunnel is nearly 20 feet (6.1 m), but there is an overhanging concrete slab at the eastern end, which reduces vertical clearance to 13 feet 6 inches (4.11 m).

There are narrow sidewalks on the outboard side of each tunnel (e.g., the north side of the westbound tunnel). Bicyclists tend to use the sidewalk, but signal lights triggered by an inductive loop were installed in 2011 to alert motorists to the presence of bicycles in the tunnel.

=== Public art and architecture ===
A stylized dragon relief sculpture by Patti Bowler, rendered in bronze, has been mounted above the eastern portal of the tunnel since 1969. The building atop the eastern portal is the Chinatown Public Health Center (Chinese: 華埠公共衛生局), a public health clinic operated by the San Francisco Department of Public Health. It was built in the 1970s and remodeled in 2010.

In 2008, the artist Moose, sponsored by a company, executed a 140-foot-long (43 m) mural by cleaning dirt from the side of the approach to the western portal of the tunnel using pressure washing and cardboard stencils, a technique known as reverse graffiti.

== In popular media ==
The Broadway Tunnel has been used as a filming location for several motion pictures, including:

- Hells Angels on Wheels (1967)
- Invasion of the Body Snatchers (1978)
- Magnum Force (1973)
- The Princess Diaries (2001)
- War (2007)
- What Dreams May Come (1998)
