= Indochinese harvest mouse =

Scientific classification
- Kingdom: Animalia
- Phylum: Chordata
- Class: Mammalia
- Order: Rodentia
- Family: Muridae
- Genus: Micromys
- Species: M. erythrotis

Binomial name
- Micromys erythrotis (Blyth, 1856)

Species of rodent

The Indochinese harvest mouse (Micromys erythrotis) is a species of rodent in the genus Micromys that is native to north Vietnam and southern China. It differs from Eurasian harvest mouse in having grey fur tinged with brown upper parts and a longer tail.
