= Jet wash =

Jet wash, jet-wash, or jetwash may refer to:

- Wake turbulence, turbulence that forms behind an aircraft as it passes through the air
- Pressure washing, the use of high-pressure water spray to clean various objects, usually outdoors
- A self-serve car wash (primarily in Europe)
