= Mice (disambiguation) =

Mice is the plural form of mouse, a rodent.

Mice or MICE may also refer to:

== Acronyms ==
- Meetings, incentives, conferencing, exhibitions (MICE tourism)
- Member of the Institution of Civil Engineers
- Metafile image code execution a.k.a. the Windows Metafile vulnerability
- Massachusetts Independent Comics Expo
- Money, Ideology, Compromise, and Ego, an acronym in counter-human intelligence for reasons why people commit treason
- Multiple imputation of chained equations
- International Muon Ionization Cooling Experiment

== Art, entertainment, and media ==
=== Music ===
- Mice, a band formed by Julianne Regan of All About Eve fame
- The Mice (band), a pop band based in Cleveland, USA

=== Television ===
- "The Mice" (The Outer Limits), a 1964 episode of the television series

== Science and technology ==
- Mice Galaxies, NGC 4676, two merging spiral galaxies
- Plural of computer mouse

== See also ==
- Mouse (disambiguation)
