= Moose (nickname) =

As a nickname, Moose may refer to:

== In arts and entertainment ==
- Moose Charlap (1928–1974), Broadway composer
- Christine McGlade (born 1963), actress on the Canadian TV show You Can't Do That On Television
- Jared Padalecki (born 1982), American actor
- Moose Peterson, wildlife photographer
- Robert B. Sherman (1925–2012), American Oscar-winning songwriter
- Michael Thomas (born 1981), drummer of the Welsh heavy metal band Bullet for My Valentine

== In politics ==
- Walter E. Foran (1919–1986), American politician from New Jersey
- Mourad Topalian (born 1943), Armenian-American political activist

== In sports ==
=== Baseball ===
- Walt Dropo (1923–2010), American Major League Baseball player
- George Earnshaw (1900–1976), Major League Baseball pitcher
- Moose Haas (born 1956), American retired baseball player
- Johnny Marcum (1909–1984), American Major League Baseball pitcher
- Moose McCormick (1881–1962), American Major League Baseball player
- Mike Moustakas (born 1988), American Major League Baseball player
- Walt Moryn (1926–1996), American Major League Baseball outfielder
- Mike Mussina (born 1968), New York Yankees pitcher
- Bill Skowron (1930–2012), American Major League Baseball player
- Moose Solters (1906–1975), American Major League Baseball player

=== Hockey ===
- André Dupont (born 1949), Canadian former National Hockey League player
- Brian Elliott (born 1985), Canadian National Hockey League player
- Moose Goheen (1894–1979), American Hall of Fame ice hockey player
- Johan Hedberg (born 1973), Swedish National Hockey League goaltender
- Moose Johnson (1886–1963), Canadian ice hockey player
- Bert Marshall (born 1943), retired ice hockey player
- Mark Messier (born 1961), retired ice hockey player and Hall of Famer
- Elmer Vasko (1935–1998), Canadian National Hockey League player
- Marcus Foligno (born 1991) Canadian National Hockey League player

=== American football ===
- Wesley Englehorn (1890–1993), American football player and coach
- Moose Gardner (1894–1954) National Football League player
- Daryl Johnston (born 1966), American former National Football League player
- Moose Krause (1913–1992), American football, basketball and baseball player, track athlete, coach, and college athletics administrator
- Muhsin Muhammad (born 1973), American football player

=== Other sports ===
- Fessor Leonard (1953–1978), American basketball player
- Greg Monroe (born 1990), American basketball player
- Mike Muscala (born 1991), American basketball player
- Mitchell Hooper (born 1995), Canadian strongman
- Wilbur Thompson (1921–2013), American 1948 Olympics shot put gold medalist

== Other fields ==
- Frederick Heyliger (1916–2001), American soldier
- Charles Panarella (1925–2017), New York mobster

== Fictional characters ==
- Moose Mason, in Archie comics
- Doug Heffernan, in the first two seasons of The King of Queens
- Moose Miller, in Snack Shack

== See also ==
- Moose (disambiguation)
- Moose (surname)
