= Soft washing =

Cleaning method using low pressure water

Soft washing is a cleaning method using low pressure water. More recently, the term "softwashing" has been used to describe any form of spraying chemicals at buildings where solutions (typically sodium hypochlorite based softwashing chemicals) are used to remove mildew, bacteria, algae and other organic stains from roofs and other building exteriors. It is so named to differentiate the method from power washing.

== Equipment ==
Soft washing equipment is not always distinctly different from power and pressure washing equipment, though specialty soft washing machines do exist. This distinction is drawn because most pressure washers are capable of basic soft washing, whereas specialty soft washing machines are not capable of pressure washing as their maximum pressures aren't high enough.

=== Pressure Washers Used for Soft Washing ===
Chemical injection nozzles convert pressure washers into soft washing machines by using a short second hose to draw chemicals directly out of a container (separate from the water supply) and mix them within the nozzle. This prevents the chemicals from flowing through the hose and gun. The suction is caused by the Venturi effect. These can generally achieve mixes of up to 6% chlorine.

Downstream injectors mix chemicals into the water after it has exited the pump but before it flows through the hose and gun. They are generally used to apply chlorine at a 0.8-1.2% concentration, but can sometimes reach a 2% concentration.

=== Purpose Made Soft Washing Machines ===
Specialty soft washing machines are generally constructed with chemical resistant diaphragm pumps that can only achieve maximum pressures of 80-300PSI (about 10% of the maximum pressure of a pressure washer). They pull a mix of cleaning chemicals and water into the pump, pressurize the mix, then send it through a hose. This differs from pressure washers which generally do not cycle chemicals through the pump, instead adding them to the water after it exits the pump. This mix can be up to 12% chlorine (about double what can be safely achieved with a pressure washer.

Electric soft washing machines are often powered by 12 volt marine batteries. They generally have lower pressure and flow than gas soft washing machines, but operate almost silently.

Gas soft washing machines include platforms built around the common Comet P40 pump or AR45 pump. Both of these produce approx. 300 PSI and approximately 11 gallons per minute of flow under ideal conditions. These have been known to shoot chemical mixes up to 60 feet when paired with the correct hoses and guns.

== Chemicals ==
The most common chemical used in soft washing is sodium hypochlorite, also known as bleach or chlorine (generally used in conjunction with a surfactant). The Asphalt Roofing Manufacturers Association recommends low-pressure bleach or detergent assisted washing as the preferred method for cleaning asphalt roofs in order to prevent damage to the shingles. While this process has an immediately visible impact on certain roof contaminants, moss but may take weeks or months to fall off after being killed with soft washing.

While sodium hypochlorite (chlorine, bleach) is the most common chemical used for soft washing building exteriors, others are used in specific situations. These include acids for rust removal and sodium percarbonate or sodium metasilicate for cleaning uncoated wood. Each of these chemicals comes with its own dangers and handling methods.

== Risks ==
Soft washing is generally considered a much safer method of cleaning than high pressure cleaning, but it does carry its own risks. One of the most expensive risks is sodium hypochlorite reacting with organic pigments in certain paint colors and certain paint lines. An inconspicuous test spot should always be checked before soft washing a painted area by putting a strong mix of sodium hypochlorite on the surface and allowing it to dry. Though any color can be affected, reds, blues, greens, and oranges are more prone to have organic pigments. Once the pigment has been stained, the only way to fix the issue is to repaint the affected area.

Additional risk comes from the potential for strong chlorine solutions to kill desirable plants. This is most often mitigated by pre-wetting any nearby plants before applying cleaning chemicals, then rinsing them after the chemical application is complete.
