= Moose River =

Moose River may refer to:

== Rivers ==
=== Canada ===
- Moose River (British Columbia)
- Moose River (Nova Scotia), site of the Moose River Gold Mines, Nova Scotia
- Moose River (Ontario)
- Moose River (Québec)

=== United States ===
- Moose River (Maine)
- Moose River (Namakan Lake), Minnesota
- Moose River (Nina Moose River), Minnesota
- Moose River (Thief Lake), Minnesota
- Moose River (Willow River), Minnesota
- Moose River (New Hampshire)
- Moose River (New York)
- Moose River (Vermont)
- Moose River (Alaska), tributary of the Kenai River
  - Moose River Site, an archeological site at the confluence of the Moose and Kenai rivers

== Places ==
- Moose River, Maine, United States
- Moose River, Pictou, Nova Scotia in Pictou County
- Moose River, Cumberland, Nova Scotia in Cumberland County
- Moose River Gold Mines, Nova Scotia in the Halifax Regional Municipality

== See also ==
- Moose (disambiguation)
