= Mouse (nickname) =

As a nickname, Mouse or The Mouse may refer to:

== People nicknamed Mouse ==
- Gordon Cleaver (1910–1994), British Second World War flying ace
- Mouse Davis (born 1932), American football coach and player
- William B. Evans (born 1958), Commissioner of the Boston Police Department
- Edward Fielden (RAF officer) (1903–1976), Royal Air Force air vice-marshal
- Curt Malawsky (born 1970), Canadian former box lacrosse player and current head coach
- Ed Mierkowicz (1924–2017), American former Major League Baseball player
- Mouse Morris (born 1951), Irish racehorse trainer and jockey
- Mouse Randolph (1909–1997), American swing jazz trumpeter
- Micheen Thornycroft (born 1987), Zimbabwean Olympic rower
- Ronnie Weiss (born 1942), leader of the band Mouse and the Traps
- Richard "Mouse" Smith (1949–2025), former President of the Delaware NAACP State conference and a close friend of Joe Biden

== People nicknamed The Mouse ==
- Pat Fischer, American football player known as "The Mouse"
- Edgar Munzel (1907–2002), American sportswriter
- Bruce Strauss (born 1952), American retired journeyman boxer
- Daniel Zaragoza (born 1957), Mexican retired boxer

== See also ==
- Mouse (disambiguation)
- Hovik Abrahamyan (born 1958), Prime Minister of Armenia nicknamed "Muk" ("Mouse")
- Krisztina Egerszegi (born 1974), Hungarian former swimmer nicknamed "Egér" ("Mouse") or "Egérke" ("Little Mouse")
- Emerson Fittipaldi (born 1946), semi-retired Brazilian automobile racing driver nicknamed Rato (Portuguese for "mouse")
- El Ratón (disambiguation) (Spanish for "The Mouse"), including a list of people (and one bull)
- Ginetta Sagan (1925–2000), human rights activist nicknamed "Topolino" ("Little Mouse")
- Mighty Mouse (nickname)
