= Harvest mouse =

Harvest mouse may refer to members of two groups of rodents:

- Micromys from Eurasia
  - particularly the Eurasian harvest mouse, Micromys minutus
- Reithrodontomys from the Americas
