= Mighty Mouse (disambiguation) =

Mighty Mouse is a cartoon superhero.

Mighty Mouse may also refer to:

- Mighty Mouse: The New Adventures, an American animated television series featuring the cartoon character
- Mighty Mouse (film), an upcoming film starring the cartoon character
- "The Mighty Space Mouse", a 1984 episode of Voltron
- Mighty Mouse (nickname), various people
- Kevin 'Mighty' Mouse, a fictional footballer in the British comic strip Hot Shot Hamish and Mighty Mouse
- Mighty mice, a genetic strain of house mouse with the myostatin gene knocked out
- Mighty Mouse, the first mouse with a scroll wheel jointly developed by NTT and ETH Zürich in 1985
- Apple Mighty Mouse, the first multi-button computer mouse produced by Apple Inc.
- Mk 4 FFAR Fin-Folding Aerial Rockets, used by the United States Air Force
