= Mighty Mouse (nickname) =

As a nickname, Mighty Mouse may refer to:

- Eric Aiken (born 1980), American featherweight boxer and former International Boxing Federation world champion
- Jimmy Alapag (born 1977), Philippine Basketball Association player
- Pam Barrett (1953–2008), Canadian politician
- Chuck Fenenbock (1917–1998), American National Football League and Canadian Football League player
- Shannon Gallant (born 1986), Australian rugby league player
- Demetrious Johnson (born 1986), American mixed martial arts fighter and Ultimate Fighting Championship flyweight champion
- Kevin Keegan, English former footballer
- Tony Leswick (1923–2001), Canadian National Hockey League player
- Ian McLauchlan (born 1942), Scottish retired rugby union player
- Mark McMillian (born 1970), American retired National Football League player
- Kyla Ross (born 1996), American artistic gymnast
- Michael Russell (tennis) (born 1978), American tennis player
- Damon Stoudamire (born 1973), American retired National Basketball Association player
- Elaine Tanner (born 1951), Canadian retired swimmer
- Zhang Anda (born 1991), Chinese snooker player

== See also ==
- Mighty Mouse (disambiguation)
- Vic Toweel (1928–2008), South African boxer and world champion nicknamed "Benoni's Mighty Mouse"
- Mouse (nickname)
