= Crawfish Creek (Wyoming) =

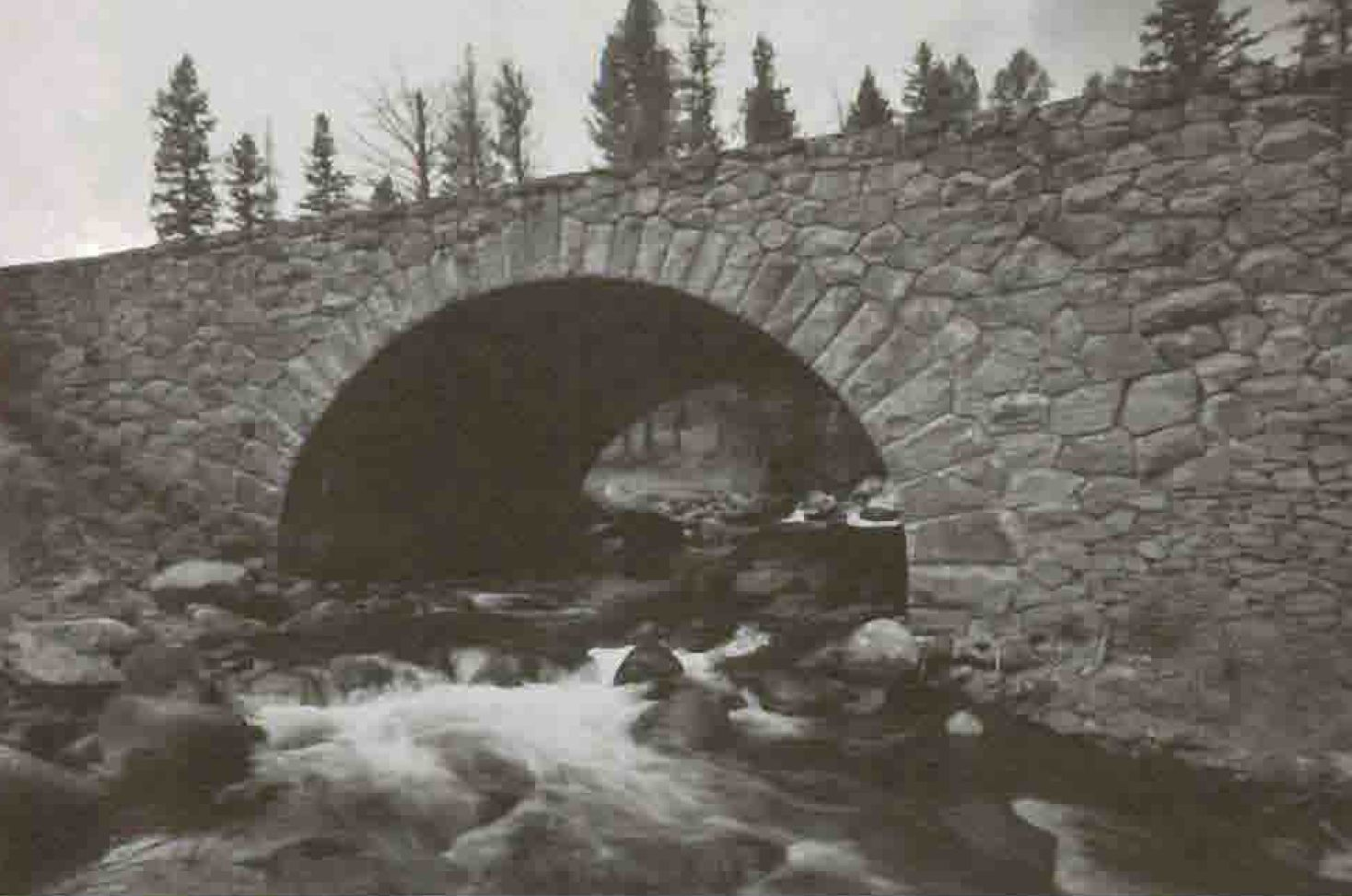
- Bridge across Crawfish Creek, 1989

Location
- Country: United States
- State: Wyoming

Physical characteristics
- Source
  - location: 44°10′47″N 110°42′08″W, Yellowstone National Park, Wyoming
- Mouth
  - location: Lewis River44°09′02″N 110°40′05″W, Yellowstone National Park, Wyoming
  - elevation: 6,913 ft (2,107 m)

Crawfish Creek is a short stream in Yellowstone National Park in the U.S. state of Wyoming This watercourse is known for its unusually warm temperatures compared to other surface water bodies in Wyoming; these elevated temperatures enable crawfish to thrive in the water. Summer water temperatures are in the range of 22 to 24 degrees Celsius; pH levels are typically about 9.1, or somewhat alkaline. The warm waters come from a southern portion of the Yellowstone volcanic zone which produces hot water from hot springs and fumaroles in the area. The stream feeds into the Lewis River just south of the Lewis River Canyon and just before the Lewis River converges with the Snake River.

30 feet (9.1 m) Moose Falls is located 75 yards (69 m) upstream from the Crawfish Creek confluence with the Lewis River.

The watershed of Crawfish Creek is densely forested with lodgepole pine, Douglas fir and other tree species.
