= Broadway (San Francisco) =

Street in San Francisco

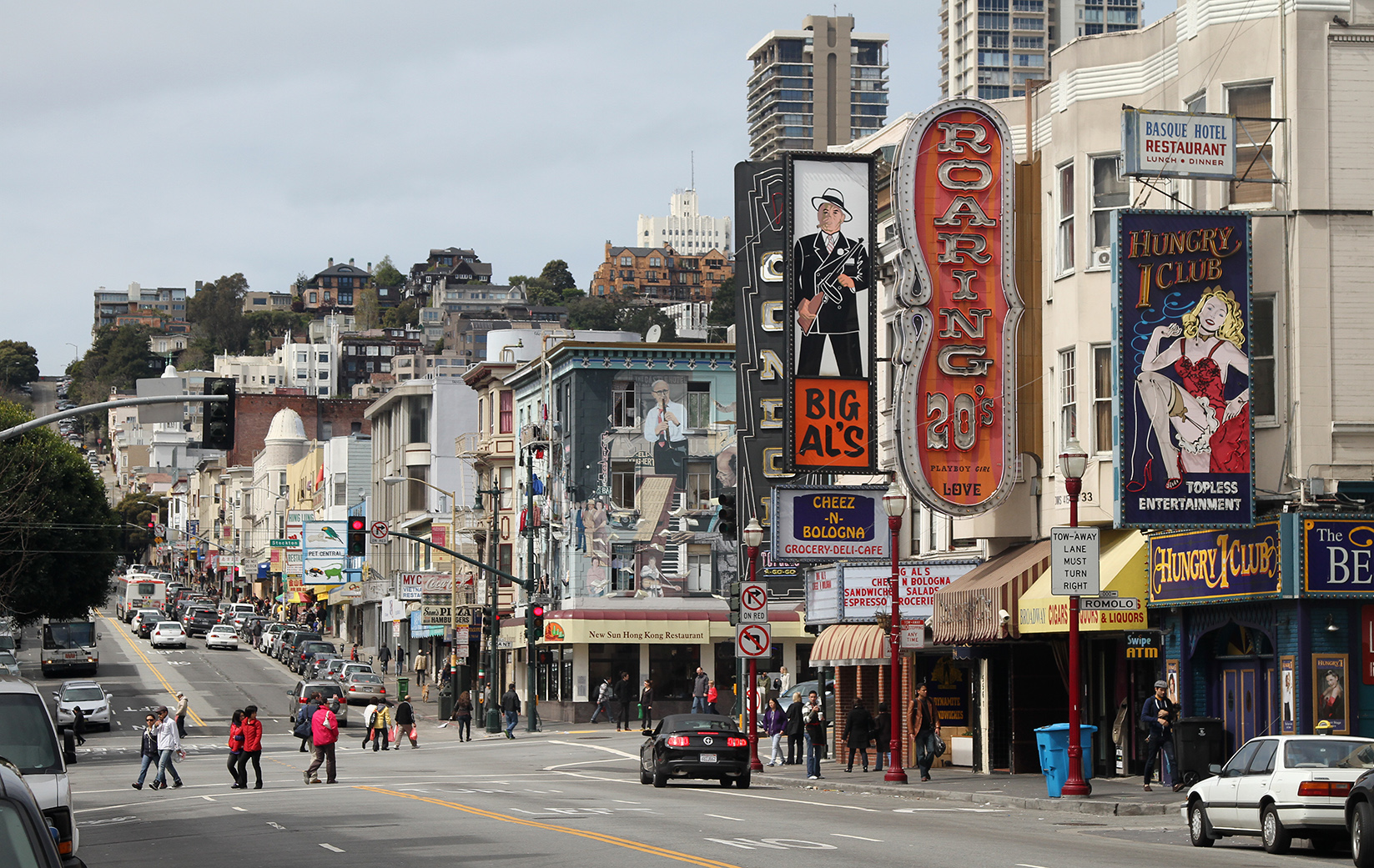
- Looking west near Columbus Ave in the nightclub and red light district of Broadway
- Location: San Francisco, California
- West end: Lyon Street
- Major junctions: US 101 (Van Ness Avenue) in the SoMa District
- East end: The Embarcadero

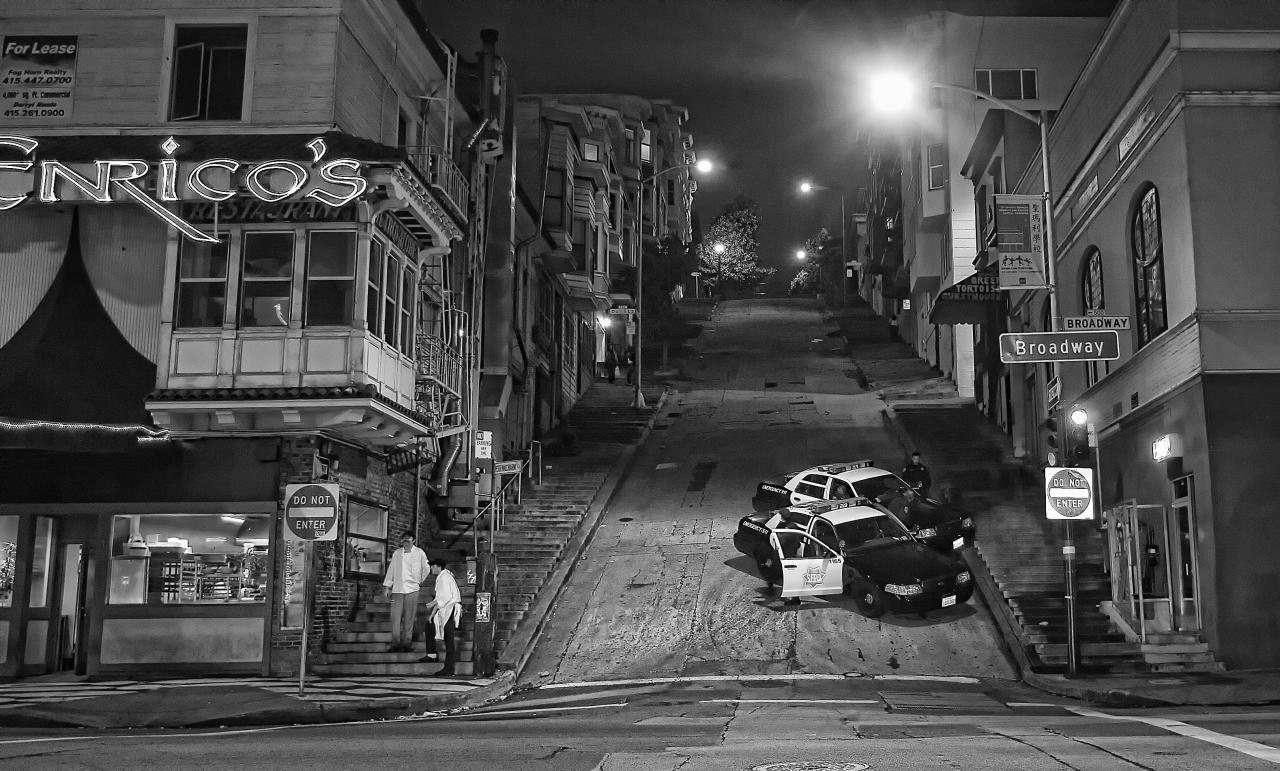
Enrico's, Broadway

Broadway is an east–west street in San Francisco that runs from The Embarcadero to the Pacific Heights neighborhood. The neon-lined stretch of Broadway through North Beach was historically the city's red-light district, home to strip clubs and other adult businesses, as well as many nightclubs and bars, and has been featured in several films and television shows. The street is home to several notable venues, such as the Showgirls theater, Convent of the Sacred Heart High School, and the City Lights Bookstore. West of the Broadway Tunnel, Broadway becomes more and more residential, moving from multiple dwelling units into two of the city's wealthier neighborhoods, Cow Hollow and Pacific Heights. It ends at Lyon Street and the Presidio which is gated to vehicular traffic.
