= Moose Mountain =

Moose Mountain refers to:

- Moose Mountain (Alaska), USA
- Moose Mountain (Minnesota), USA
- Moose Mountain (New Hampshire), USA
- Moose Mountain (Benson, New York), an elevation located in Hamilton County, New York
- Moose Mountain (Hamilton County, New York), an elevation
- Moose Mountain (Wells, New York), an elevation in Hamilton County, New York
- Moose Mountain (Wyoming), Teton Range, Wyoming, USA
- Moose Mountain (Alberta), Canada
- Moose Mountain (electoral district), a former federal electoral district in Saskatchewan, Canada
- Moose Mountain Provincial Park in Saskatchewan, Canada
- Rural Municipality of Moose Mountain No. 63, Saskatchewan, Canada
- Moose Mountain Upland, a plateau in southern Saskatchewan
- Moose Mountain Creek, a river in Saskatchewan
- Moose Mountain Lake, a lake in Saskatchewan
