= Mouse =

Small long-tailed rodent

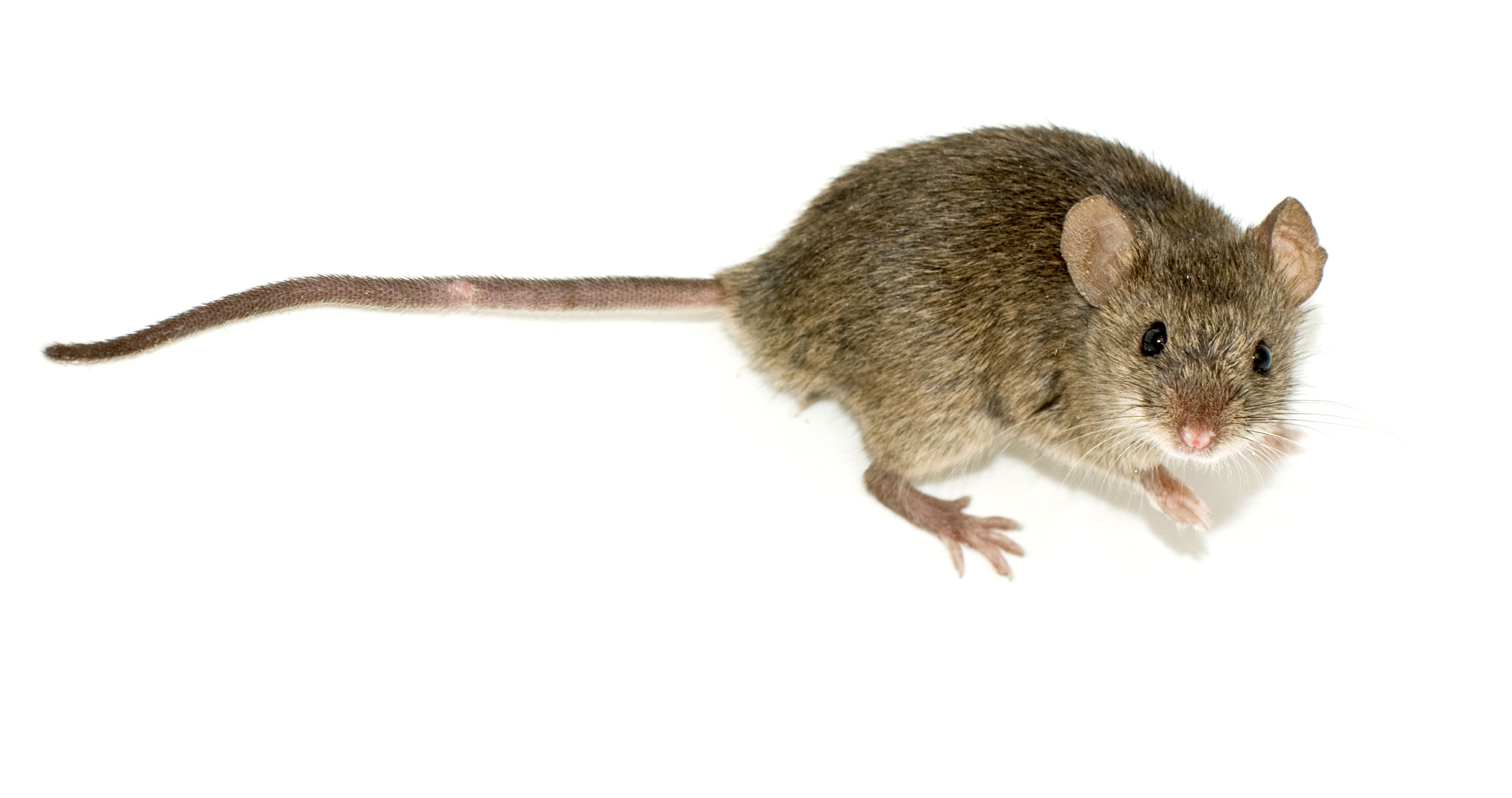
House mouse (Mus musculus)

Phase-specific vocalizations of male mice at the initial encounter during the courtship sequence

Mouse voice

A mouse (pl. mice) is a small rodent, characteristically known to have a pointed snout, small rounded ears, a body-length scaly tail, and a high breeding rate. The best known mouse species is the common house mouse (Mus musculus). Mice are widely available as pets, but not as popular as some other rodents. In some places, certain kinds of field mice are locally common. They are known to invade homes for food and shelter.

Mice are typically distinguished from rats by their size. Generally, when a muroid rodent is discovered, its common name includes the term mouse if it is smaller, or rat if it is larger. The common terms rat and mouse are not taxonomically specific. Typical mice are classified in the genus Mus, but the term mouse is not confined to members of Mus and can also apply to species from other genera such as the deer mouse (Peromyscus).

Domestic mice sold as pets often differ substantially in size from the common house mouse. This is attributable to breeding and different conditions in the wild. The best-known strain of mouse is the white lab mouse. It has more uniform traits, which makes these mice more useful in research.

Cats, wild dogs, foxes, birds of prey, snakes, some large lizards, and certain kinds of arthropods have been known to prey upon mice. Despite this, mice populations remain plentiful. Due to its remarkable adaptability to almost any environment, the mouse is one of the most successful mammalian genera living on Earth today.

In certain contexts, mice can be considered vermin. Vermin are a major source of crops damage, as they are known to cause structural damage and spread disease. Mice spread disease through their feces and are often carriers of parasites. In North America, breathing dust that has come in contact with mouse excrement has been linked to hantavirus, which may lead to hantavirus pulmonary syndrome (HPS).

As primarily nocturnal animals, mice compensate for their poor eyesight with a keen sense of hearing. They depend on their sense of smell to locate food and avoid predators.

In the wild, mice are known to build intricate burrows. These burrows have long entrances and are equipped with escape tunnels. In at least one species, the architectural design of a burrow is a genetic trait.

== Types of animals known as mice ==
The most common mice are murines, in the same clade as common rats. They are murids, along with gerbils and other close relatives.

- order Dasyuromorphia
  - marsupial mice, smaller species of Dasyuridae
- order Rodentia
  - suborder Castorimorpha
    - family Heteromyidae
      - Kangaroo mouse, genus Microdipodops
      - Pocket mouse, tribe Perognathinae
      - Spiny pocket mouse, genus Heteromys
  - suborder Anomaluromorpha
    - family Anomaluridae
      - flying mouse
  - suborder Myomorpha
    - family Cricetidae
      - Brush mouse, Peromyscus boylii
      - Florida mouse
      - Golden mouse
      - American harvest mouse, genus Reithrodontomys
      - Voles, often referred to as "field or meadow mice"
    - family Muridae
      - typical mice, the genus Mus
      - Field mice, genus Apodemus
        - Wood mouse, Apodemus sylvaticus
        - Yellow-necked mouse, Apodemus flavicollis
      - Large Mindoro forest mouse
      - Big-eared hopping mouse
      - Luzon montane forest mouse
      - Forrest's mouse
      - Pebble-mound mouse
      - Bolam's mouse
      - Eurasian harvest mouse, genus Micromys

== Emotions ==
Researchers at the Max Planck Institute of Neurobiology have confirmed that mice have a range of facial expressions. They used machine vision to spot familiar human emotions like pleasure, disgust, nausea, pain, and fear.

== Diet ==
In nature, mice are largely herbivores, consuming any kind of fruit or grain from plants. However, mice adapt well to urban areas and are known for eating almost all types of food scraps. In captivity, mice are commonly fed commercial pelleted mouse diet. These diets are nutritionally complete, but they still need a large variety of vegetables.

Despite popular belief, most mice do not have a special appetite for cheese. Like many animals, they prefer sweet, high-calorie carbohydrates. They will only eat cheese for lack of better options.

== Human use ==
=== As experimental animals ===
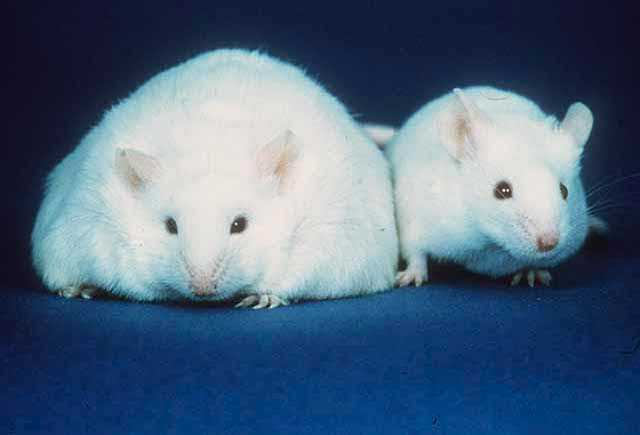
Knockout mouse (left) and normal mouse (right)

Mice are common experimental animals in laboratory research of biology and psychology fields primarily because they are mammals, and also because they share a high degree of homology with humans. They are the most commonly used mammalian model organism, more common than rats. The mouse genome has been sequenced, and virtually all mouse genes have human homologs. The mouse has approximately 2.7 billion base pairs and 20 pairs of chromosomes. They can also be manipulated in ways that are illegal with humans, although animal rights activists often object. A knockout mouse is a genetically modified mouse that has had one or more of its genes made inoperable through a gene knockout. Experimental mouse model systems include mouse models of colorectal and intestinal cancer, mouse models of Down syndrome and mouse models of breast cancer metastasis.

Reasons for common selection of mice are that they are small and inexpensive, have a widely varied diet, are easily maintained, and can reproduce quickly. Several generations of mice can be observed in a relatively short time. Mice are generally very docile if raised from birth and given sufficient human contact. However, certain strains have been known to be quite temperamental.

=== As pets ===
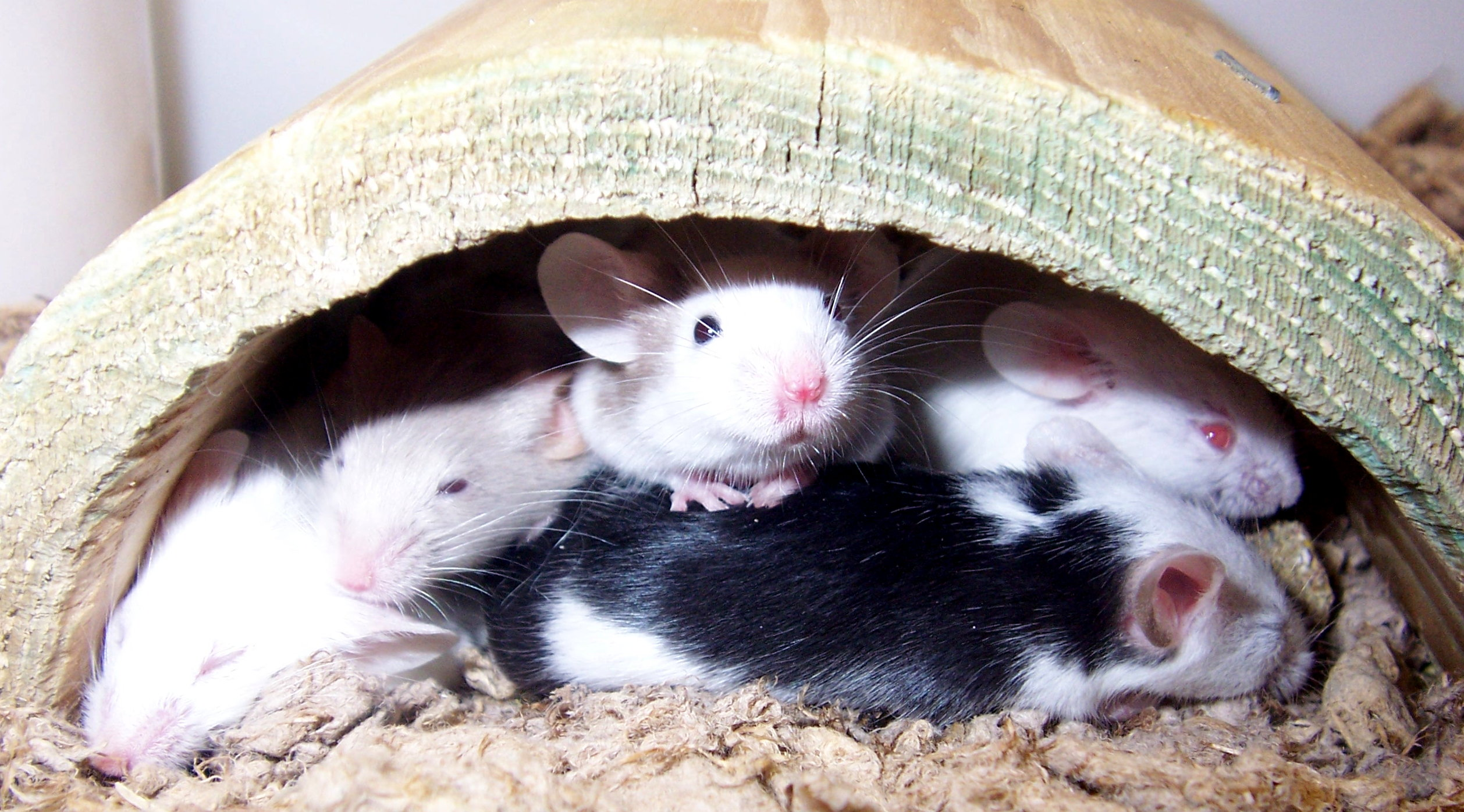
Pet mice

Many people buy mice as companion pets. They can be playful, loving and can grow used to being handled. Like pet rats, pet mice should not be left unsupervised outside as they have many natural predators, including (but not limited to) birds, snakes, lizards, cats, and dogs. Male mice tend to have a stronger odor than the females. However, mice are careful groomers and as pets they never need bathing. Well looked-after mice can make ideal pets. Some common mouse care products are:

- Cage – Usually a hamster or gerbil cage, but a variety of special mouse cages are now available. Most should have a secure door.
- Food – Special pelleted and seed-based food is available. Mice can generally eat most rodent food (for rats, mice, hamsters, gerbils, etc.)
- Bedding – Usually made of hardwood pulp, such as aspen, sometimes from shredded, uninked paper or recycled virgin wood pulp. Using corn husk bedding is avoided because it promotes Aspergillus fungus, and can grow mold once it gets wet, which is rough on their feet.

=== As feed ===
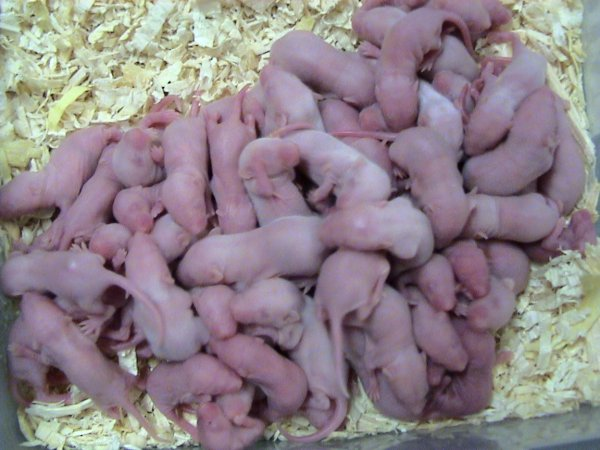
"Pinkie" mice for sale as reptile feed

Mice are a staple in the diet of many small carnivores. In various countries mice are used as feed for pets such as snakes, lizards, frogs, tarantulas, and birds of prey, and many pet stores carry mice for this purpose. Such mice are sold in various sizes and with various amounts of fur. Mice without fur are easier for the animal to consume; however, mice with fur may be more convincing as animal feed.

=== As food ===
Humans have eaten mice since prehistoric times. In Victorian Britain, fried mice were still given to children as a folk remedy for bed-wetting; while Jared Diamond reports creamed mice being used in England as a dietary supplement during Second World War rationing. Mice are a delicacy throughout eastern Zambia and northern Malawi, where they are a seasonal source of protein. Field rat is a popular food in Vietnam and neighboring countries. In many countries, however, mouse is no longer a food item.

Prescribed cures in Ancient Egypt included mice as medicine. In Ancient Egypt, when infants were ill, mice were eaten as treatment by their mothers. It was believed that mouse eating by the mother would help heal the baby who was ill.

== See also ==
- Fee, Fi, Fo, Fum, and Phooey, mice who orbited the Moon a record 75 times in 1972 on Apollo 17
- List of fictional rodents
- Mouse brain development timeline
- Mousetrap
- Musophobia (fear of mice)
- Rodentology
