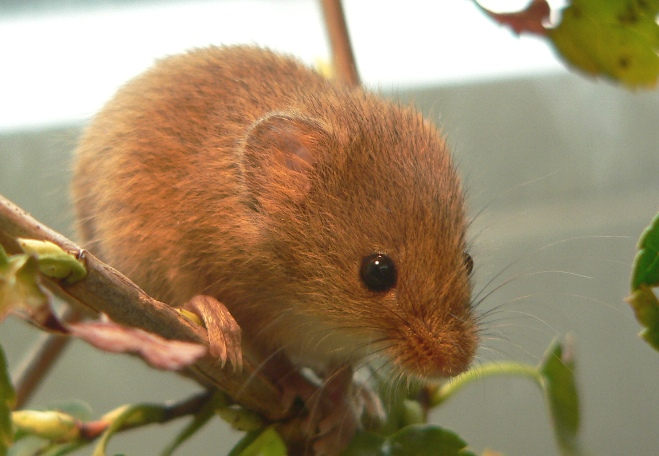

Conservation status
- Least Concern (IUCN 3.1)

Scientific classification
- Kingdom: Animalia
- Phylum: Chordata
- Class: Mammalia
- Order: Rodentia
- Family: Muridae
- Genus: Micromys
- Species: M. minutus

Binomial name
- Micromys minutus (Pallas, 1771)
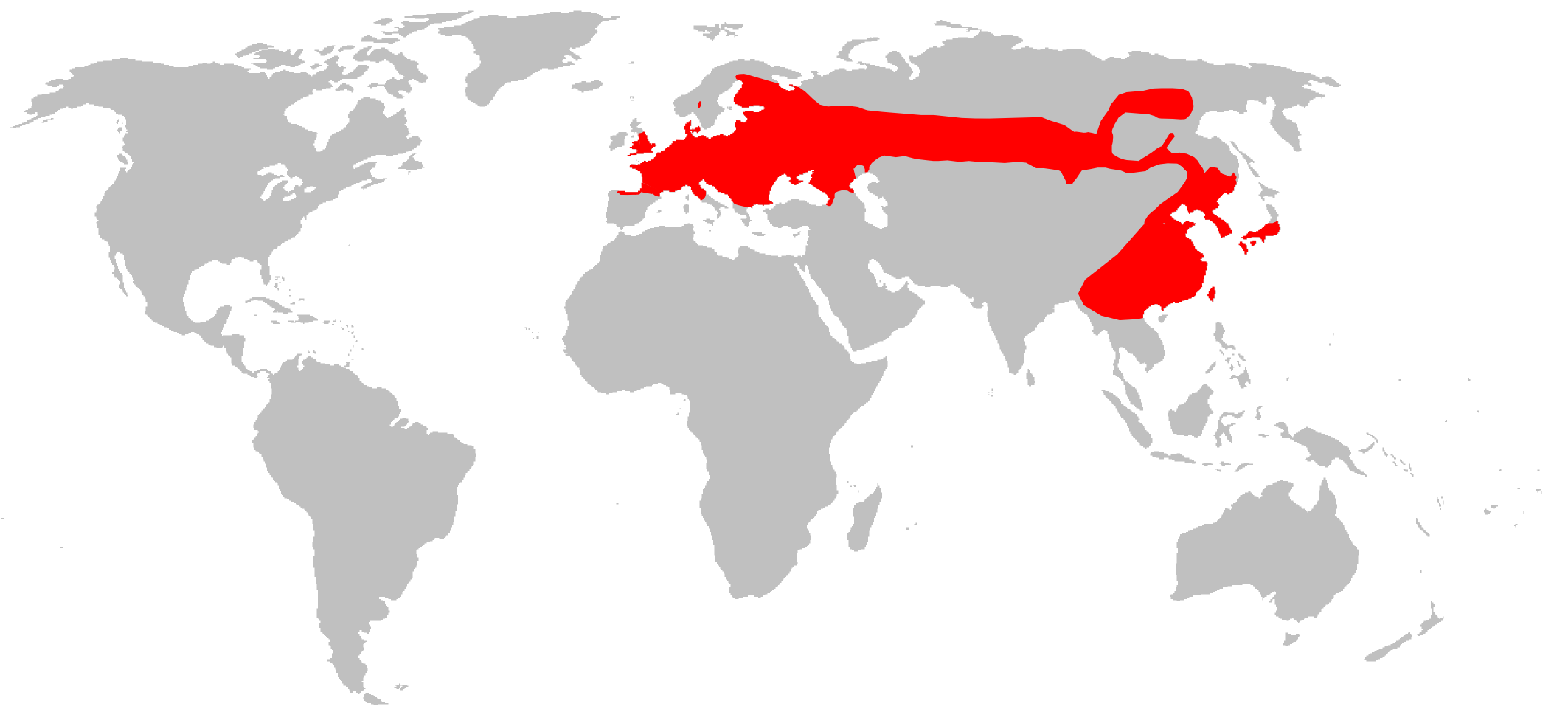
- Distribution of Eurasian harvest mouse

= Eurasian harvest mouse =

Species of rodent

The harvest mouse (Micromys minutus) is a small mouse native to Europe and Asia. It is typically found in fields of cereal crops, such as wheat, rice and oats, in reed beds and in other tall ground vegetation, such as long grass and hedgerows. It has reddish-brown fur with white underparts and a naked, highly prehensile tail, which it uses for climbing. It is the smallest European rodent; an adult may weigh as little as 4 grams (0.14 oz). It eats chiefly seeds and insects, but also nectar and fruit. Breeding nests are spherical constructions carefully woven from grass and attached to stems well above the ground.

== History ==
The genus Micromys most likely evolved in Asia and is closely related to the long-tailed climbing mouse (Vandeleuria) and the pencil-tailed tree mouse (Chiropodomys). Micromys first emerged in the fossil record in the late Pliocene, with Micromys minutus being recorded from the Early Pleistocene in Germany. They underwent a reduction in range during glacial periods, and were confined to areas in Europe that were free of ice. During the mid-Pleistocene, Micromys minutus also lived in parts of Asia. This suggests that they spread towards Asia when the ice sheets started to melt. Other evidence suggests that Micromys minutus could have been introduced accidentally through agricultural activities during Neolithic times.

Before the harvest mouse had been formally described, Gilbert White reported their nests in Selborne, Hampshire:

They never enter into houses; are carried into ricks and barns with the sheaves; abound in harvest; and build their nests amidst the straws of the corn above the ground, and sometimes in thistles. They breed as many as eight at a litter, in a little round nest composed of the blades of grass or wheat. One of these nests I procured this autumn, most artificially platted, and composed of the blades of wheat; perfectly round, and about the size of a cricket-ball. It was so compact and well-filled, that it would roll across the table without being discomposed, though it contained eight little mice that were naked and blind.

Tennis balls used in play at Wimbledon have been recycled to create artificial nests for harvest mice.

== Description ==
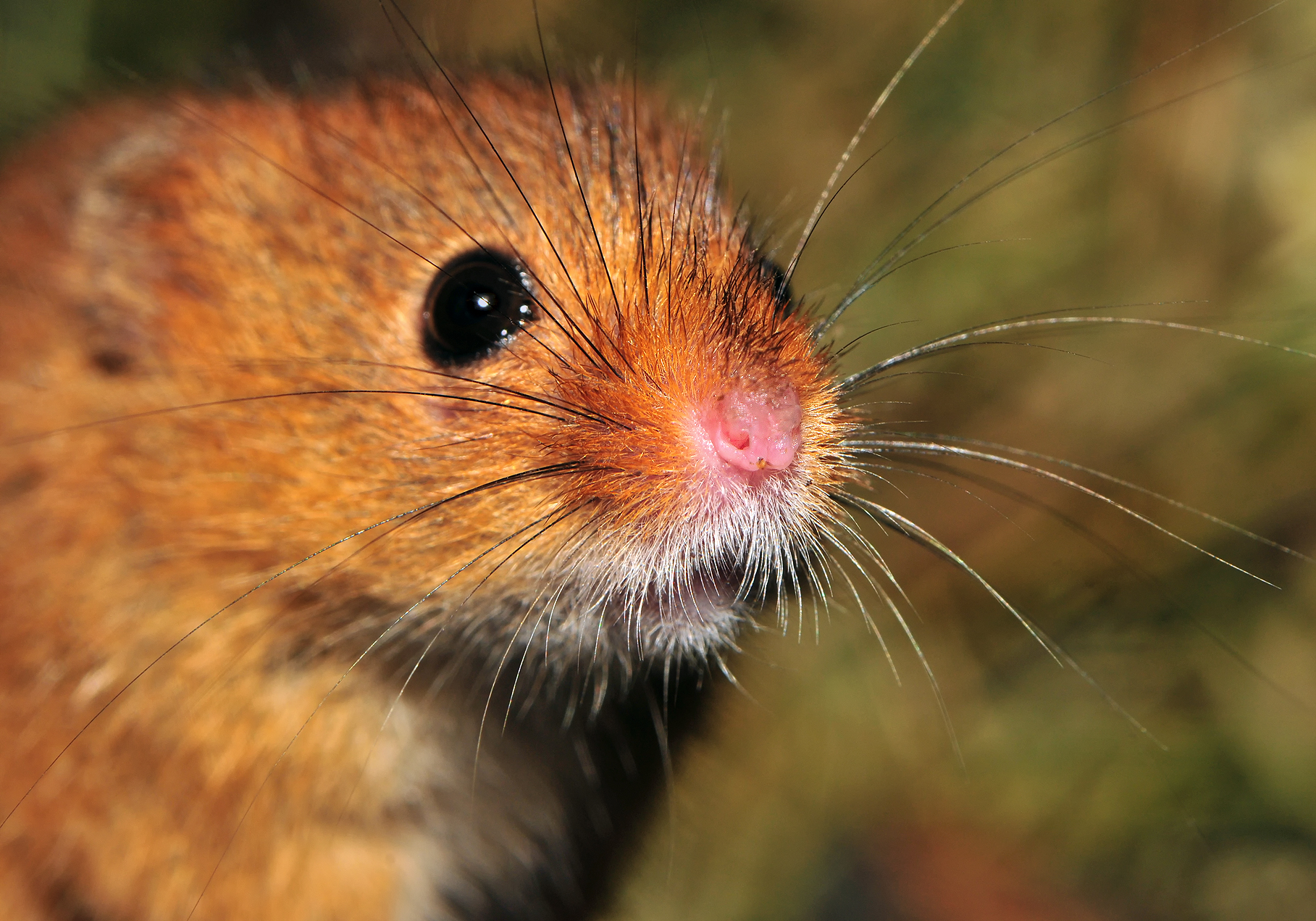
Portrait

The harvest mouse ranges from 55 to 75 mm (2.2 to 3.0 in) long, and its tail from 50 to 75 mm (2.0 to 3.0 in) long; it weighs from 4 to 11 g (0.14 to 0.39 oz), or about half the weight of the house mouse (Mus musculus). Its eyes and ears are relatively large. It has a small nose, with short, stubble-like whiskers, and thick, soft fur, somewhat thicker in winter than in summer.

The upper part of the body is brown, sometimes with a yellow or red tinge; the under-parts range from white to cream coloured. It has a prehensile tail which is usually bicoloured and furless at the tip. The mouse's rather broad feet are adapted specifically for climbing, with a somewhat opposable, large outermost toe, allowing it to grip stems with each hindfoot and its tail, thus freeing the mouse's forepaws for food collection. Its tail is also used for balance.

== Ecology ==
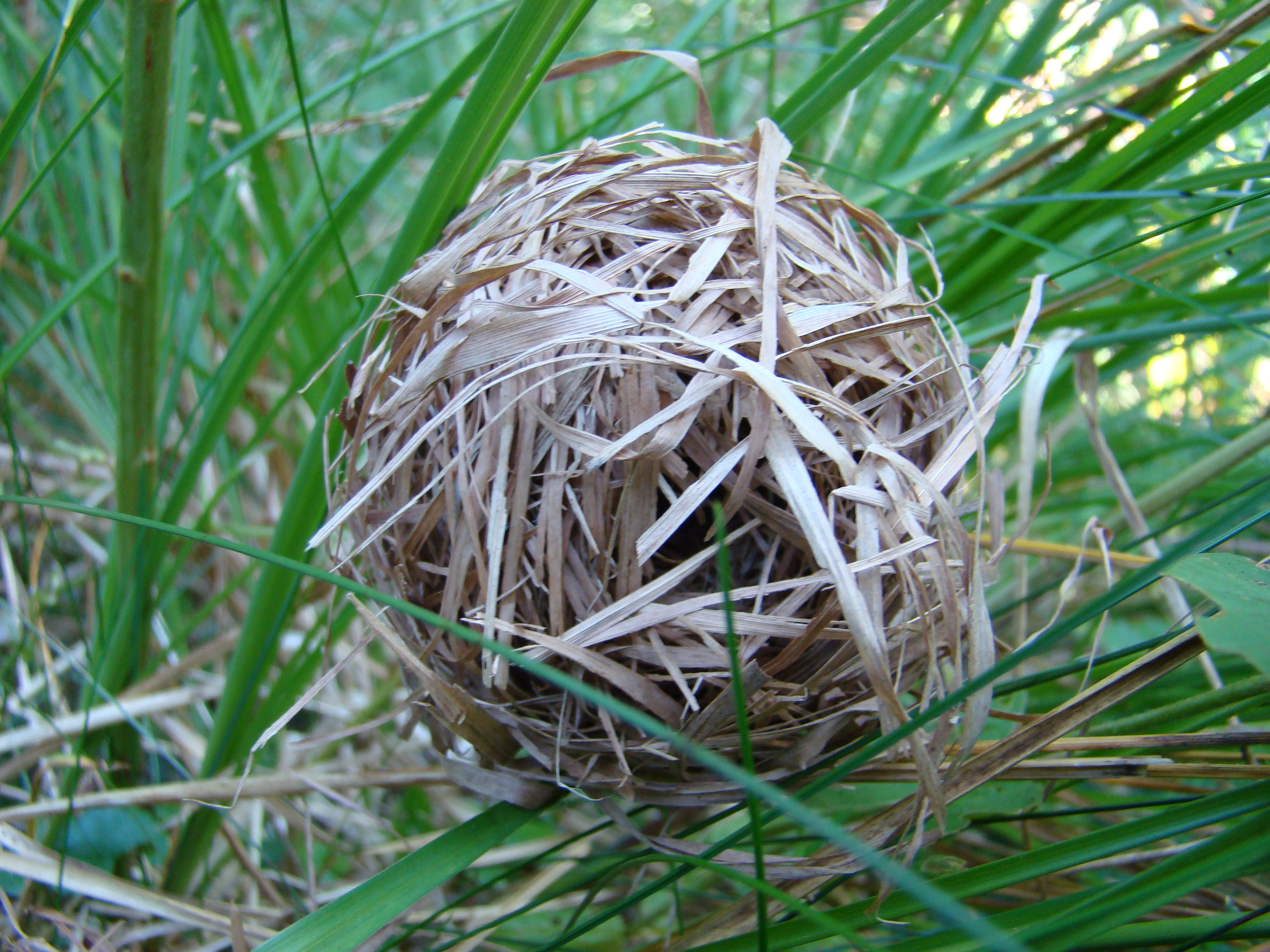
The harvest mouse's nest

=== Habitat and distribution ===
The harvest mouse is common in all east coast counties of England, reaching the North York Moors. It also inhabits less favourable habitats, such as woodlands and forests in the west.

Harvest mice reside in a large variety of habitats, from hedgerows to railway banks. Harvest mice seem to have an affinity for all types of cereal heads, except for maize (Zea mays). Harvest mice typically like using monocotyledons for their nest-building, especially the common reed (Phragmites australis) and Siberian iris (Iris sibirica). Most harvest mice prefer wetlands for their nesting habitats.

Harvest mice in Japan like making wintering nests near the ground from grasses that are dried, which indicates that they require vegetative cover in the winter, as well as in the warmer seasons. Grasslands with a mix of perennials and annual grasses are required to balance the increases in nesting periods and the mice's need to secure nutrients. Habitat selection might be the result of differences in the structure of the landscape of grasslands and wetlands in the area.

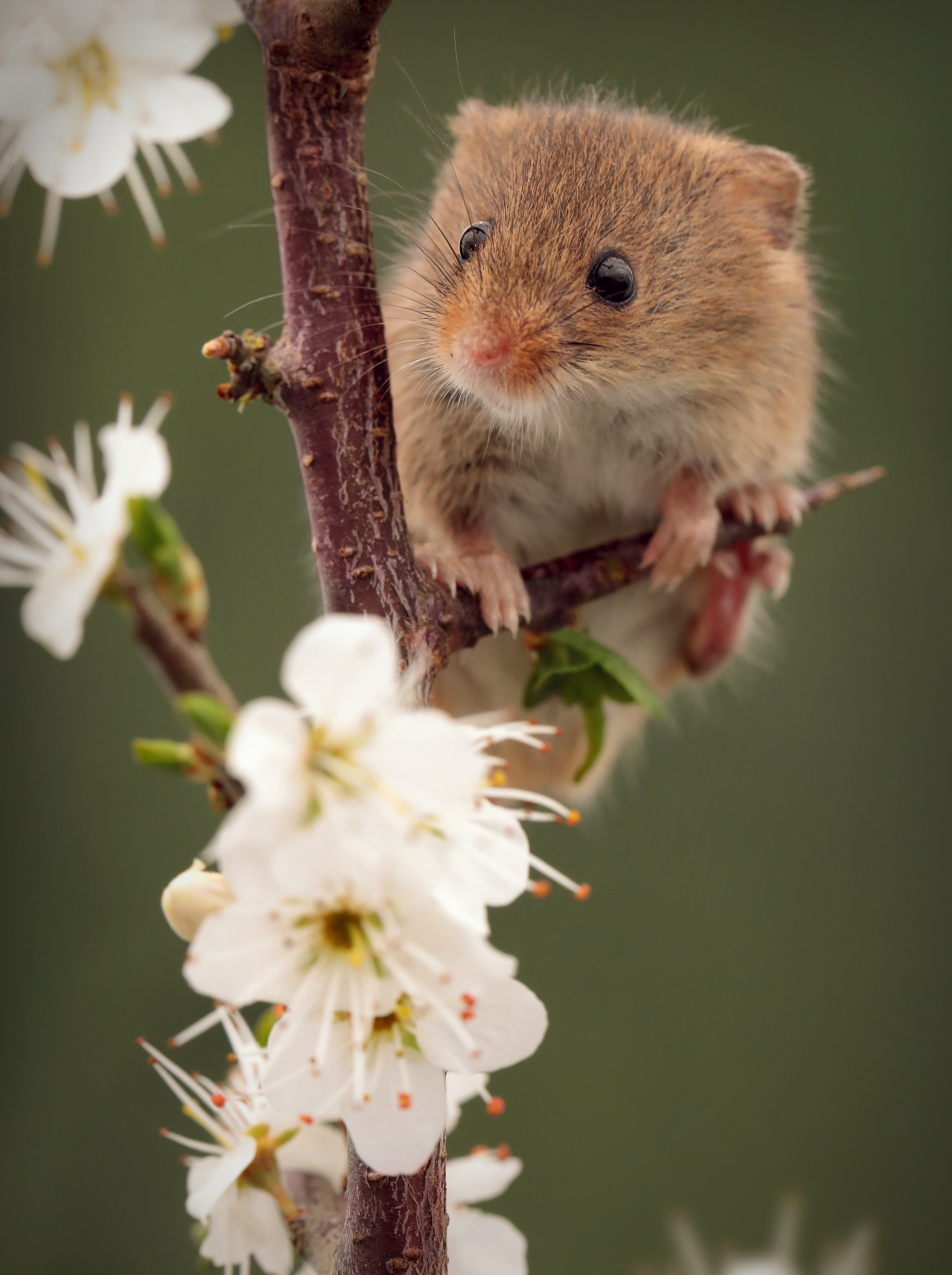
Harvest mice are adept vertical climbers

=== Behaviour ===
Harvest mice have a short lactation period of 15–16 days. They spend most of their life in long grass and other vegetation such as reedbeds, rushes, ditches, cereals and legumes. They are very skilled at climbing among grasses due to their tail. They grasp leaves and stems with their feet and tail, which leaves their hands free for other tasks. These tasks can include grooming and feeding. Harvest mice have a prehensile tail that functions as an extra limb during climbing. During the lactation period, the pups are able to climb a vertical bar by the time they first emerge from their nest. At 3–7 days they learn hand grasping, and at 6–9 days they learn food grasping. Between 6–11 days, they adopt a quadrupedal stance, and at 10-11 there is tail prehension, and righting at 10–12 days. The righting response in harvest mice develops earlier, but takes longer to master than the other skills the pups learn. They cannot climb horizontally by the time they are weaned, suggesting that horizontal climbing is not as essential as vertical climbing.

=== Predators ===
Their predators include domesticated cats, barn owls, tawny owls, long-eared owls, little owls, and kestrels.

== Reproduction ==
In most rodent species, females prefer familiar males to unfamiliar ones. The adaptive preference of mating with familiar males is not uncommon as familiarity is a proxy for quality that is seen in many solitary animals. Harvest mice are thought to be solitary, and the females prefer for familiar males over unfamiliar. There is no size dimorphism between the sexes so the females are considered dominant over the males. Females do not show interest in the male's odor. When females are in oestrus they spend more time with familiar males, and prefer the one that is heavier. While in dioestrus, the female spends more time with unfamiliar males.

In most years in Britain, harvest mice build their first breeding nests in June or July; occasional nests are built earlier in April or early May. They prefer building their breeding nests above ground. In Russia, harvest mouse breeding occurs in November and December in cereal ricks, buckwheat, and other cereal heads.

== Conservation ==
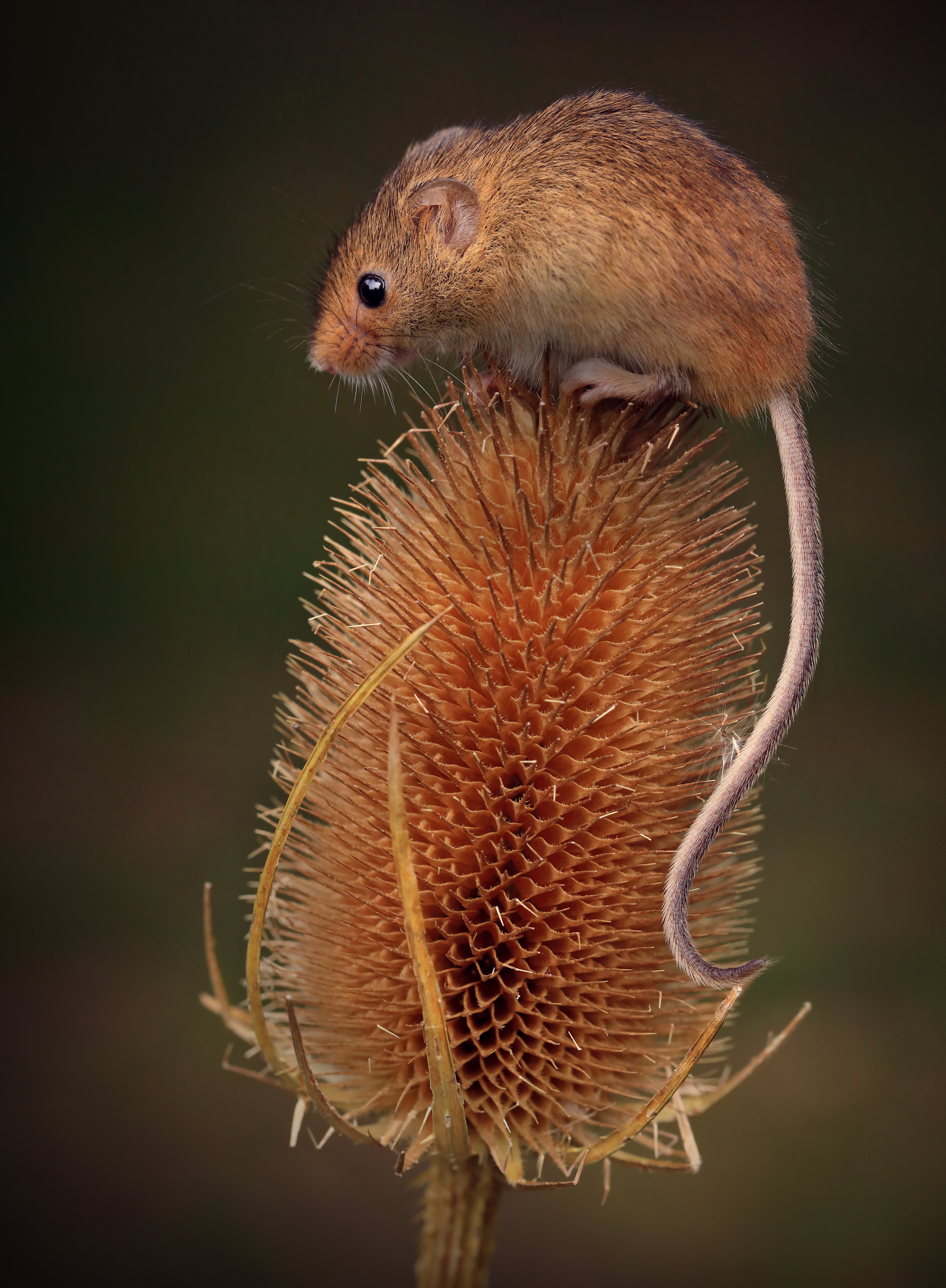
Harvest mouse on a teasel's head

Due to their habitat, in Japan harvest mice are threatened by a number of anthropogenic effects such as farming, pesticide use, crop rotation, habitat destruction, fragmentation, and wetland draining. Grasslands in that country are rapidly decreasing in area, and are also becoming increasingly fragmented.

The first survey of the harvest mouse in Britain was conducted by the Mammal Society in the 1970s, and later followed up by the National Harvest Mouse survey in the late 1990s. These surveys indicated that harvest mouse nests were on a decline with 85% of the suitable habitat no longer available for the mice.

As of 2019 the harvest mouse is protected under the 1981 Wildlife and Countryside Act of 1981 and the UK Post-2010 Biodiversity Framework: Implementation Plan.In the UK, several active projects aim to save the harvest mouse, with some released in Ealing in 2024 and Cheshire between 2002 and 2004, and in 2025 a project in Devon led by two 13-year old girls.
