= Moose Falls =

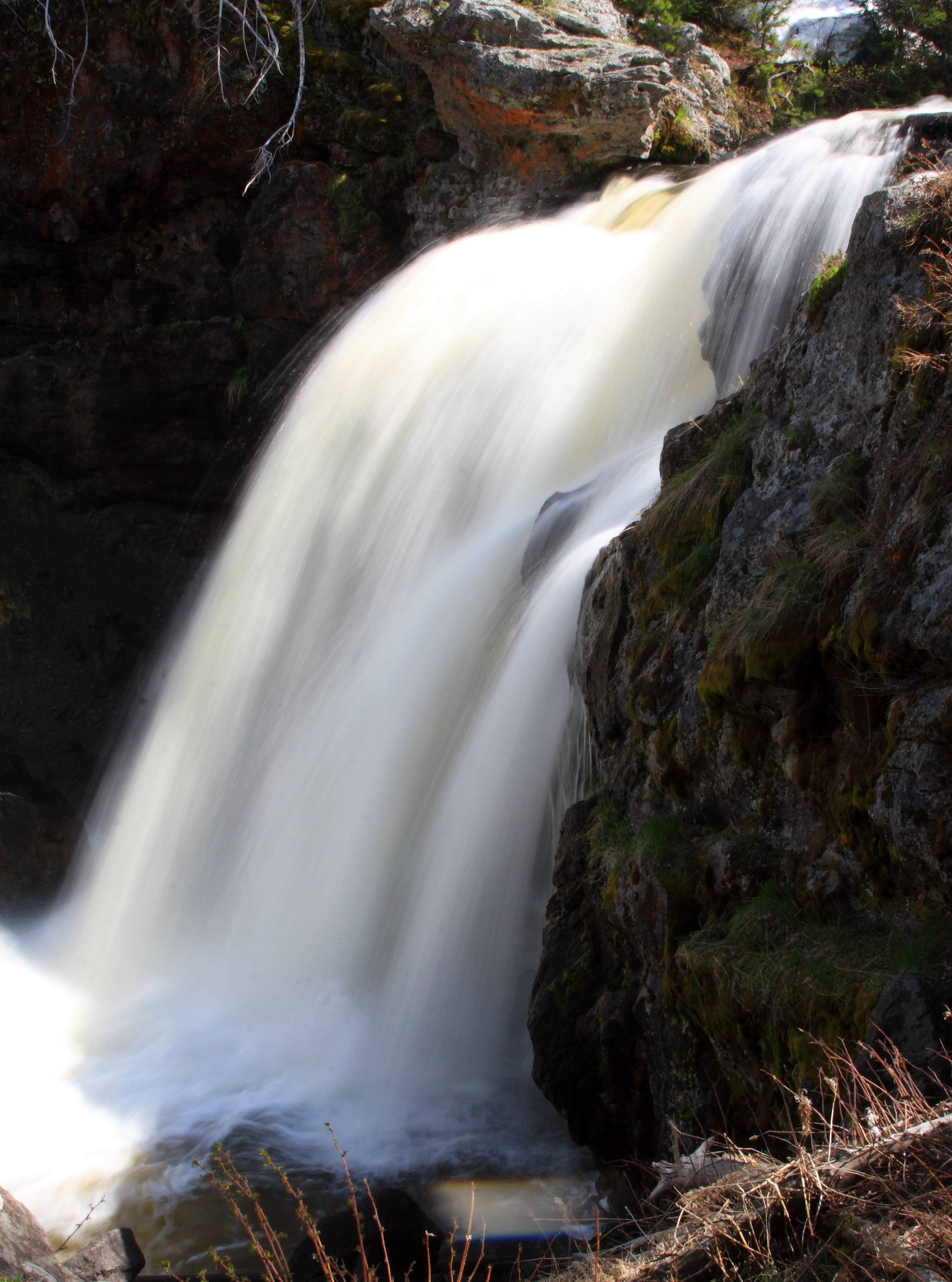
- 2009
- Interactive map of Moose Falls
- Location: Yellowstone National Park, Teton County, Wyoming
- Coordinates: 44°09′08″N 110°40′20″W
- Type: Plunge
- Total height: 30 feet (9.1 m)
- Watercourse: Crawfish Creek

Moose Falls (height 30 feet (9.1 m)) is a plunge type waterfall on Crawfish Creek in Yellowstone National Park. The waterfall was named in 1885 by members of the Arnold Hague Geologic Survey for the plentiful moose found in the southern sections of the park. The falls are just 75 yards (69 m) west of south entrance road via an easy trail that begins 1.2 miles (1.9 km) north of the south entrance station.

== Climate ==
There is climate data for the nearby Snake River Station. Moose Falls has a subarctic climate (Köppen Dfc).

Climate data for Snake River, Wyoming, 1991–2020 normals, 1905–2020 extremes: 6882ft (2098m)
Month	Jan	Feb	Mar	Apr	May	Jun	Jul	Aug	Sep	Oct	Nov	Dec	Year
Record high °F (°C)	51 (11)	57 (14)	62 (17)	74 (23)	83 (28)	92 (33)	97 (36)	94 (34)	90 (32)	83 (28)	64 (18)	51 (11)	97 (36)
Mean maximum °F (°C)	38.9 (3.8)	43.9 (6.6)	53.4 (11.9)	62.2 (16.8)	72.5 (22.5)	81.2 (27.3)	86.6 (30.3)	86.2 (30.1)	81.0 (27.2)	69.4 (20.8)	51.9 (11.1)	39.4 (4.1)	87.7 (30.9)
Mean daily maximum °F (°C)	26.0 (−3.3)	30.1 (−1.1)	38.8 (3.8)	45.5 (7.5)	56.4 (13.6)	66.4 (19.1)	76.9 (24.9)	76.3 (24.6)	66.0 (18.9)	50.7 (10.4)	35.3 (1.8)	25.4 (−3.7)	49.5 (9.7)
Daily mean °F (°C)	13.3 (−10.4)	16.4 (−8.7)	24.9 (−3.9)	32.9 (0.5)	42.2 (5.7)	50.3 (10.2)	57.4 (14.1)	55.7 (13.2)	47.0 (8.3)	35.8 (2.1)	23.1 (−4.9)	13.5 (−10.3)	34.4 (1.3)
Mean daily minimum °F (°C)	0.6 (−17.4)	2.7 (−16.3)	11.0 (−11.7)	20.4 (−6.4)	28.0 (−2.2)	34.2 (1.2)	37.9 (3.3)	35.1 (1.7)	28.0 (−2.2)	20.8 (−6.2)	10.8 (−11.8)	1.6 (−16.9)	19.3 (−7.1)
Mean minimum °F (°C)	−25.9 (−32.2)	−23.5 (−30.8)	−14.7 (−25.9)	3.6 (−15.8)	15.3 (−9.3)	24.8 (−4.0)	28.5 (−1.9)	25.3 (−3.7)	17.7 (−7.9)	6.0 (−14.4)	−12.2 (−24.6)	−25.1 (−31.7)	−30.5 (−34.7)
Record low °F (°C)	−47 (−44)	−56 (−49)	−50 (−46)	−22 (−30)	0 (−18)	16 (−9)	20 (−7)	12 (−11)	2 (−17)	−22 (−30)	−38 (−39)	−47 (−44)	−56 (−49)
Average precipitation inches (mm)	3.88 (99)	3.07 (78)	3.02 (77)	2.81 (71)	2.78 (71)	2.44 (62)	1.41 (36)	1.60 (41)	1.87 (47)	2.27 (58)	3.46 (88)	4.21 (107)	32.82 (835)
Average snowfall inches (cm)	65.00 (165.1)	50.20 (127.5)	31.00 (78.7)	25.90 (65.8)	5.00 (12.7)	0.30 (0.76)	0.00 (0.00)	0.00 (0.00)	0.20 (0.51)	8.90 (22.6)	42.40 (107.7)	64.70 (164.3)	293.6 (745.67)
Average extreme snow depth inches (cm)	52.9 (134)	60.9 (155)	62.4 (158)	50.5 (128)	22.8 (58)	0.9 (2.3)	0.0 (0.0)	0.0 (0.0)	0.1 (0.25)	5.7 (14)	15.9 (40)	39.1 (99)	65.2 (166)
Average precipitation days (≥ 0.01 in)	18.0	16.0	14.8	14.8	12.5	12.7	9.0	9.2	8.7	10.2	14.9	19.6	160.4
Average snowy days (≥ 0.1 in)	17.6	15.7	12.5	8.6	3.0	0.3	0.0	0.0	0.4	4.3	11.5	18.2	92.1
Source 1: NOAA
Source 2: XMACIS2 (records, 1991-2020 monthly max/min & snow depth)

== Gallery ==
Images of Moose Falls
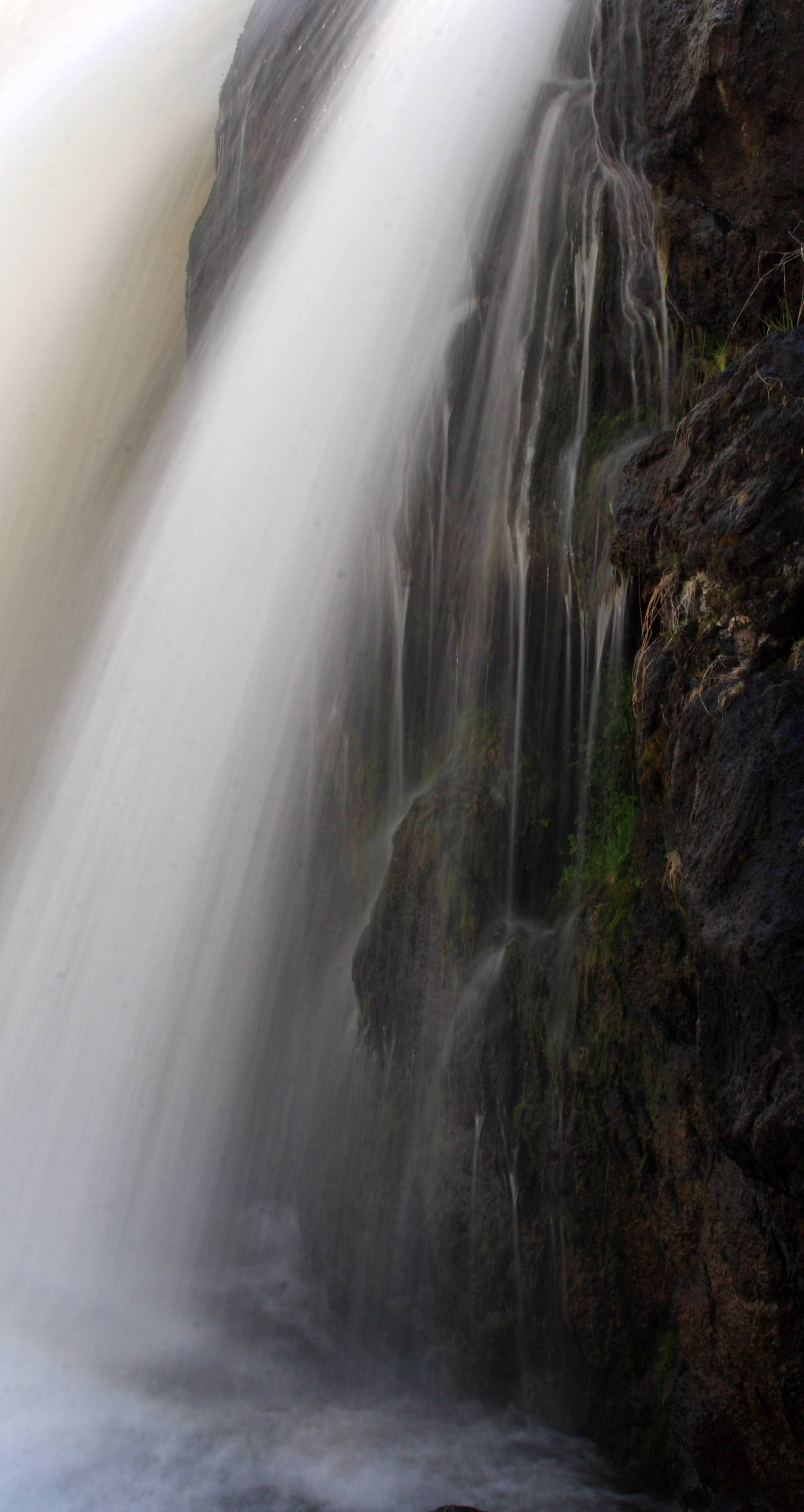
Close up of Moose Falls

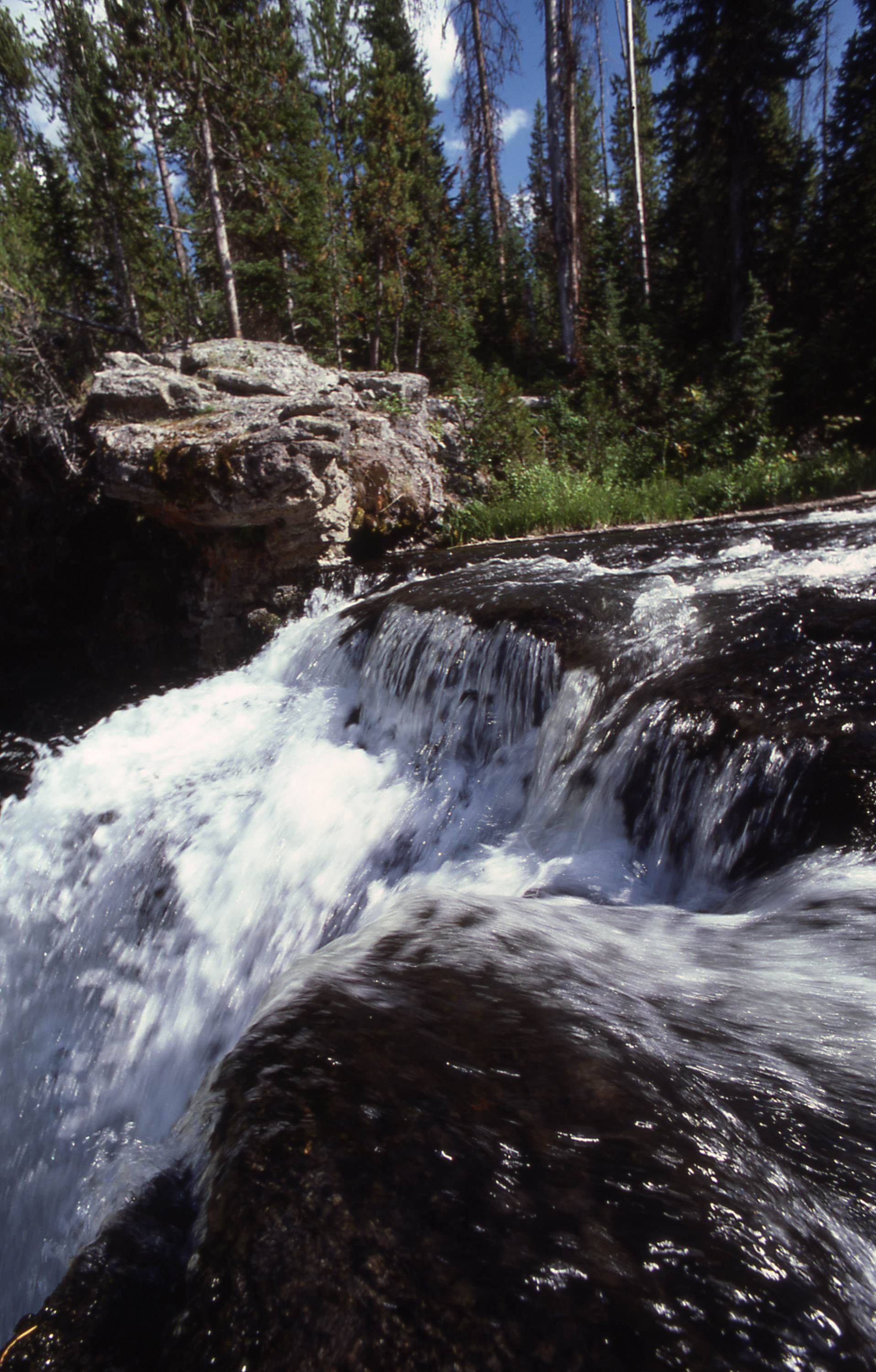
Brink, 1977

== See also ==
- Waterfalls in Yellowstone National Park
