= Mousse (disambiguation) =

Mousse is a form of creamy dessert typically made from egg and cream.

Mousse may also refer to:

- Hair mousse
- Moussé, a commune in the French department of Ille-et-Vilaine
- Cape Mousse, Adélie Land, Antarctica
- Mousse Boulanger (1926–2023), Swiss poet, actress and television producer
- Mousse T., stage name of German DJ and record producer Mustafa Gündoğdu (born 1966)
- Mousse, protagonist of the 2009 French film The Refuge
- Mousse, female lead character of the 1953 French film Sins of Paris
- Mousse, a character from the Ranma ½ series
- Tire mousse, a flexible foam ring that replaces or complements the inner tube of a tire
- Mousse (magazine), a contemporary art magazine

== See also ==
- Moose (disambiguation)
