= Moose Peterson =

American photographer (born 20th century)

Bruce "Moose" Peterson (born 20th century) is an American wildlife, aviation and landscape photographer whose work has been published in a variety of magazines worldwide and in over twenty books.

In 1998, he was the recipient of the John Muir Conservation Award for his efforts as an endangered-species advocate. Peterson's primary area of interests center on rare and endangered species in North America, particularly in California.
