= Stay mouse =

Antiquated part of a sailing vessel's standing rigging

A stay mouse is an antiquated part of a sailing vessel's standing rigging. On all sailing ships built before about the 19th century, the stays were of natural cords. These lines were looped around the top of each section of the wooden masts using a spliced loop or seized loop in their ends. During the 16th century some riggers began to attach stays by splicing or seizing only a small loop into the end of the stay then passing the rope's tail around the mast and back through the small loop, like a slip-knot. To prevent this from slipping tightly around the mast when in use, a strong bulge was built into the standing part of the rope that could not fit through the small loop. This bulge was called a mouse or stay mouse.

As galvanized and stainless steel standing rigging replaced natural fibers, and steel and aluminum replaced wood for masts, these methods were no longer required. Classic boat and historic ship enthusiasts, along with model makers, continue to use and study these technologies.
