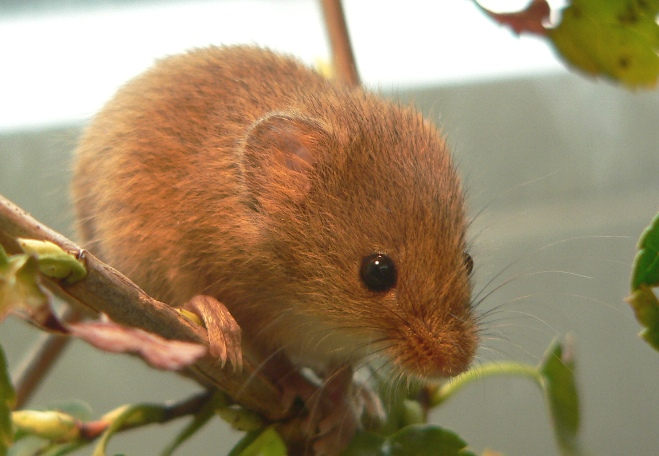
- Eurasian harvest mouse (Micromys minutus)

Scientific classification
- Domain: Eukaryota
- Kingdom: Animalia
- Phylum: Chordata
- Class: Mammalia
- Order: Rodentia
- Family: Muridae
- Tribe: Rattini
- Genus: Micromys; Dehne, 1841

Type species
- Micromys agilis Dehne, 1841

Species
- Micromys erythrotis; Micromys minutus; †Micromys bendai; †Micromys caesaris; †Micromys chalceus; †Micromys cingulatus; †Micromys coronensis; †Micromys kozaniensis; †Micromys liui; †Micromys paricioi; †Micromys praeminutus; †Micromys steffensi

= Micromys =

Micromys Temporal range: Late Miocene to Recent

Genus of rodents

Micromys is a genus of small rodents in the subfamily Murinae. The genus contains two living species: the widespread Eurasian harvest mouse (Micromys minutus) of much of Europe and Asia; and the more restricted Indochinese harvest mouse (Micromys erythrotis) of Vietnam, southern China, and perhaps nearby regions. Fossils of Micromys date back to the Late Miocene and include at least 10 extinct species, which form several lineages.

== Taxonomy ==
Micromys is not closely related to any other murine genus, which has made elucidating its phylogenetic relationships difficult. Previously, it was placed in a distinct murine clade also containing Hapalomys, Chiropodomys, and Vandeleuria, but studies have since found this clade to be polyphyletic, and instead found Micromys to belong to a division of its own that forms a sister group to the tribe Rattini, which contains the true rats among many other genera. It has been debated over whether Micromys belongs in its own tribe (Micromyini) or is a basal member of the Rattini, but the American Society of Mammalogists presently classifies it in Rattini.

== Geographic range ==
M. minutus lives throughout Europe and northern Asia. Distribution ranges from northwest Spain through most of Europe, across Siberia to Korea, north to about 65 degrees in Russia, south to the northern edge of Mongolia. There are also isolated populations in southern China west through Yunnan.

== Habitat ==
M. minutus prefers habitats characterized by tall grasses. These would include high meadows, reed grass plots, bushland interspersed with grasses and grain fields. In Italy and East Asia, they also make a home in rice fields. Population density may be very high in favorable environments. Originally, these mice lived in humid regions with high, long-lasting grasses growing near rivers, ponds, and lakes. With the advent of human encroachment, however, M. minutus has been forced to live along roadsides and in crop fields. When land is cleared or crops harvested, this mouse is left homeless. The problem is solved by the mouse either forming a shallow burrow in the soil, or finding shelter in the barn or silo. Not all mice are so lucky, however, and many mice die after being rendered homeless.

== Physical description ==
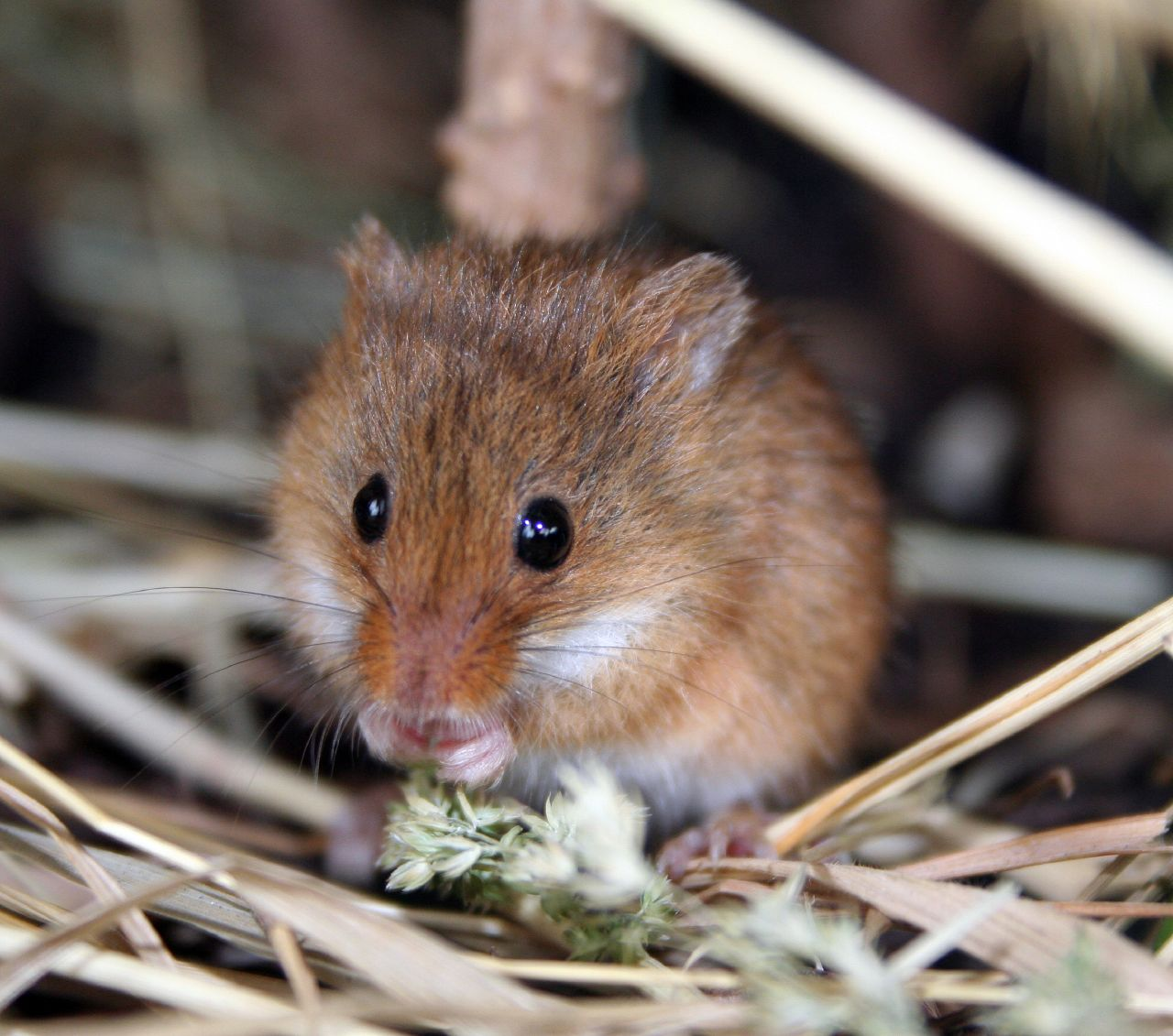

M. minutus is a small mouse, ranging in size from 55 to 75 mm (2.2–3.0 in) long, with a tail that is usually 50 to 75 mm (2.0–3.0 in) long. It has large eyes and ears, which permits it to see the slightest motions and hear the faintest sounds in the darkness. It has a small, blunt nose encircled by vibrissae. The fur is soft and thick, with the upper parts of the body a brownish color with a yellowish or reddish tinge, and the under parts white to buffy colored. The prehensile tail is bicolored and lacks fur at the very tip, and the feet are fairly broad. The feet are specially adapted for climbing, with the outer of the five toes on each foot being large and more-or-less opposable. This mouse can grip a stem with each hindfoot and its tail, leaving the forepaws free for collecting food. It can also use its tail for balance as it scurries along long grass stems. The fur is somewhat thicker and longer in the winter than in the summer. As with other members of its subfamily, M. minutus has moderately low crowned teeth with rounded cusps on the biting surface arranged in three longitudinal rows. The masseter muscle, as well as the lateral muscle of the jaw, are moved forward on the maxillary, providing very efficient, effective gnawing action. The auditory bullae are large, and it is thought that the size of these resonating chambers enables the mouse to detect low frequency sounds carried over great distances, and thus be better able to escape predation.
