= Reverse graffiti =

Method of creating images on surfaces by removing dirt

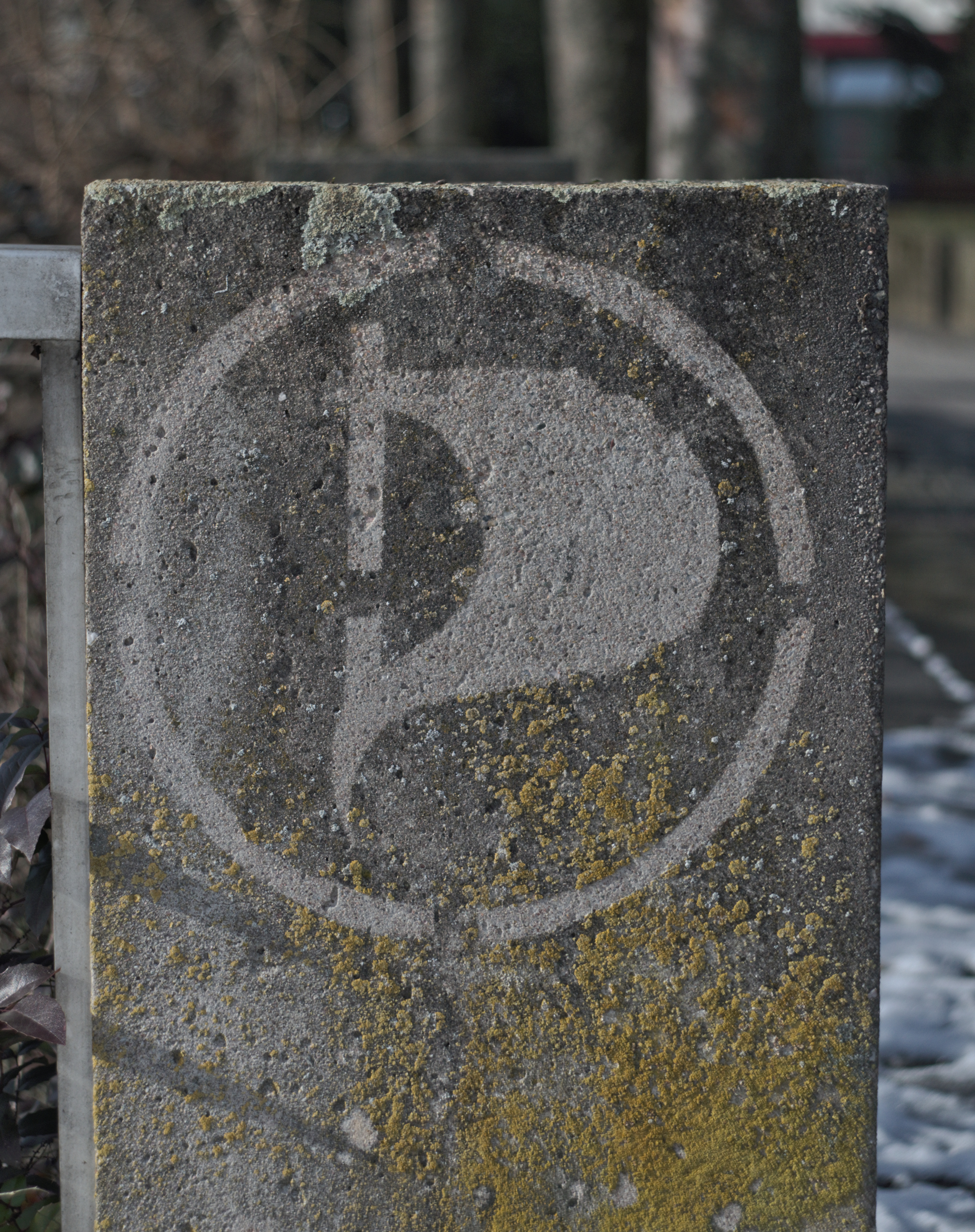
Reverse graffiti for the Pirate Party in Bayreuth, Germany

Reverse graffiti (Note: also known as clean tagging, dust tagging, grime writing, clean graffiti, green graffiti, or clean advertising) is a method of creating temporary or semi-permanent images on walls or other surfaces by removing dirt from a surface. It can also be done by simply removing dirt with the fingertip from windows or other dirty surfaces, such as writing "wash me" on a dirty vehicle. Others, such as graffiti artist Moose, use a cloth or a high-power washer to remove dirt on a larger scale.

Reverse graffiti has been used as a form of advertising, although this usage has been controversial, as its legality varies depending on jurisdiction.

== Origins ==
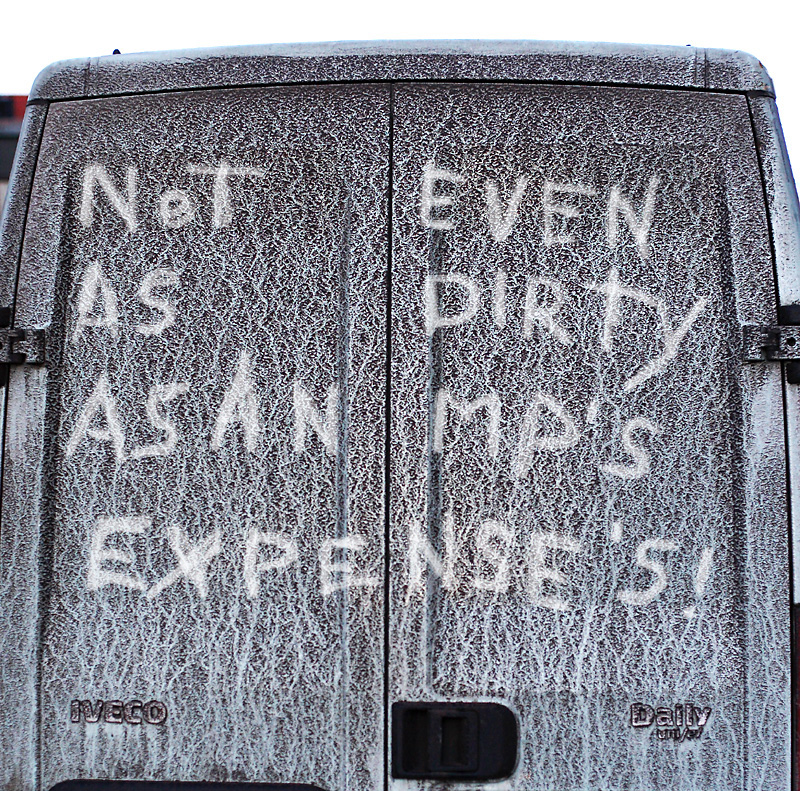
"Not even as dirty as an MP's expenses!" written on the back doors of a van, using a fingertip

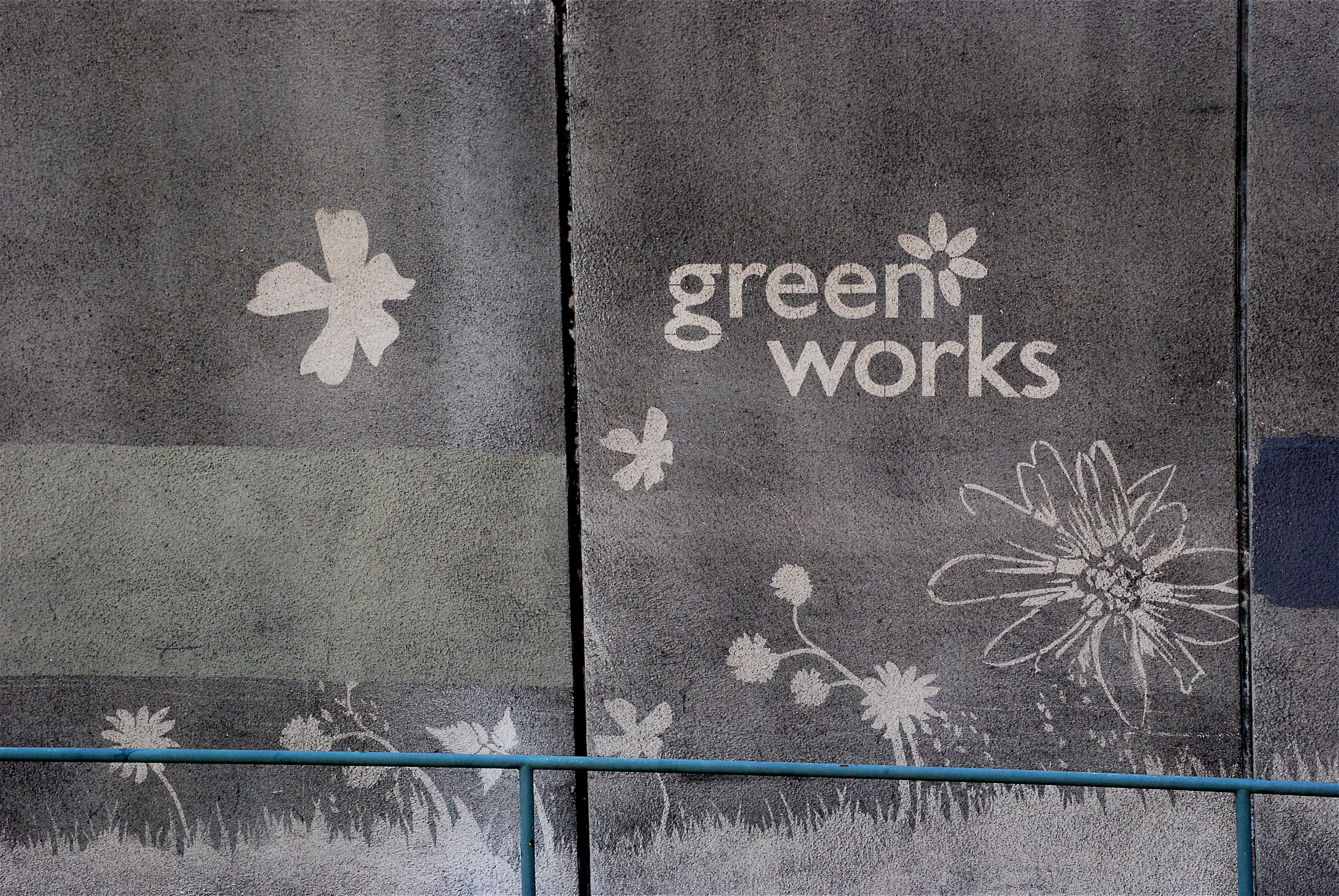
Part of a piece by Moose in San Francisco, California

English graffiti artist Paul "Moose" Curtis is one of the first street artists to make an art piece using the reverse graffiti technique. Curtis discovered the technique while working as a dishwasher in a restaurant; when he attempted to wipe a sauce stain from a wall that he assumed to be brown, he found that it was a white wall stained by cigarette smoke, and that his cleaning rag had left a trail like white spray paint. From there, Curtis began his career in the music industry eventually going on to manage a record label. The technique gained traction once Moose began promoting an album for his record label in Leeds, England.

Curtis had some legal trouble with the British Council, who were undecided on the legality of reverse graffiti. Curtis has said: “I felt like I created this really curious process that flipped the laws and made it really awkward for the legal system to deal with... it was just in a beautiful gray area..."

The first large-scale reverse graffiti art piece was made by Alexandre Orion in 2006. The intervention was called Ossario (ossuary) and was over 1000 feet long. The municipality of São Paulo washed it away on July 26.

== Environmental effects ==
Reverse graffiti is a subtractive process, most often 'cleaning' dirt and pollution from public areas to leave behind messages and/or art pieces. The process has also been linked to the term 'reverse-pollution' literally describes the process of undoing or cleaning pollution caused by human interaction.

It is estimated that one 55-inch square requires 4-5 gallons of water to create an impression; this is around thirty times less than is needed to produce a paper poster of comparable size.

== Process ==
There are a few different ways to approach reverse graffiti.

It most often starts with a stencil created by the artist. Stencils are made of plastic, steel, aluminum, and/or wood. Stencil designs can be laser cut or cut by hand.

Artists use power washers, rags, and even toothbrushes. Power washers are the most common technique used among commissioned artists as they are the fastest and most efficient choice to cover large areas. Rags and small brushes can be used to wipe away dust (often on cars or windows) or other lightly dirty surfaces. In some videos, artists can be seen using toothbrushes and concrete cleaner to scrub out smaller messages or pictures.

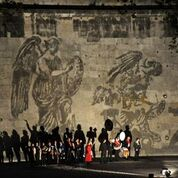
Triumphs and Laments by William Kentridge (Rome, Italy)

== Commercial ==
As with traditional graffiti, the technique is also used commercially as a form of out-of-home advertising. In this context, marketers call it "clean advertising" or "clean graffiti".

Reverse graffiti has been described by promoters as an environmentally friendly form of advertising, since it is temporary, and can sometimes be done with innocuous or biodegradable materials.

Companies such as Microsoft, Channel 4 and Smirnoff have advertised their products in this way. In response to Moose's use of the technique for advertising in Leeds, a city council representative described the work as "illegal advertising". Leeds council later attempted a 12-month trial program allowing clean advertising in exchange for a percentage of fees. The program was criticised by local officials. In 2011, a Swindon advertising firm was fined by the city's council for a reverse graffiti campaign.

In the Netherlands one needs to have a permit for commercial advertisements in a public space even if nothing is being destroyed.

In Hungary under the name "inverz graffiti" companies and brands like The Coca-Cola Company with "It's Rite" for Sprite, Monster, Deutsche Telekom's local arm Magyar Telekom, Manpower, Ringier publishing house for launching its Népsport blogging platform, TUC advertised with this tool.

== See also ==
- Glossary of graffiti
- List of street artists
- Street art sculptures – Street art genre
- Stencil street art – Graffiti painted through a stencil
- Street art – Visual art in public spaces
- Street installation – Form of street art and installation art
