= Moose (graffiti artist) =

British graffiti artist

- Born: Paul Curtis
- Citizenship: British
- Known for: Reverse graffiti – creating images by cleaning dirt from walls and surfaces
- Notable work: Commercial work for Xbox and Smirnoff
- Movement: Reverse graffiti

Moose is the pseudonym of Paul Curtis, a British graffiti artist. Instead of using traditional graffiti methods, Moose creates his art by cleaning dirt and grime off surfaces.

Curtis was involved with the Leeds-based Sound Clash record label, which released records primarily between 1995 and 1999 and was a favorite of Coldcut and Norman Cook. He also promoted the Sound Clash club nights, at which Andrew Weatherall was an early fixture and Tricky made a rare DJ appearance. Curtis has DJ'ed and promoted across the world.

Curtis is also a commercial artist and has been paid to create advertisements for companies such as Xbox and Smirnoff.

== Career as a graffiti artist ==
=== Technique ===
Curtis uses tools such as a shoe brush, water, and manual labor to create freehand drawings and illustrations. He is also known to use a power washer to create intricate images on buildings, under bridges, and in tunnels.

=== Influence ===
According to many sources, Curtis is the originator of the reverse graffiti technique, which involves creating negative lines and space through dirt to create an image or pattern. In an interview with NPR, Curtis stated that he was inspired by people writing their names in grime on tunnel walls in his hometown, Leeds.

=== Style ===
Curtis's art expression is considered non-damaging to the Earth's environment as well as temporary. Eventually, the dirt and grime that is cleaned away from the surface will naturally return to its prior state over some time.
