= Pressure washing =

Use of high-pressure water jet for cleaning hard surfaces

A pressure washer is used to remove old paint from a boat.

Patio flagstones being pressure-washed using a rotary nozzle.

Pressure washing or power washing is the use of high-pressure water spray to remove loose paint, mold, grime, dust, mud, and dirt from surfaces and objects such as buildings, vehicles and concrete surfaces. The volume of a mechanical pressure washer is expressed in gallons or liters per minute, often designed into the pump and not variable. The pressure, expressed in pounds per square inch, pascals, or bar, is designed into the pump but can be varied by adjusting the unloader valve or using specialized nozzle tips. Machines that produce pressures from 750 to 30,000 psi (5 to 200 MPa) or more are available.

The terms "pressure washing" and "power washing" are used interchangeably in many scenarios, and there is some debate as to whether they are actually different processes.

An industrial pressure-washing surface cleaner is a tool consisting of two to four high-pressure jets on a rotating bar that swivels when water flows. Some systems involve a wheeled circular shroud which is moved along the surface which protects the user from spray and debris. This action creates a uniform cleaning pattern that can clean flat surfaces at a rapid rate. Many low-cost household- or consumer-grade systems typically use a single orifice which cannot be adjusted for spray pattern.

Hydro-jet cleaning is a more powerful form of power washing, employed to remove buildup and debris in tanks and lines.

== Areas of use ==
Pressure washing is employed by businesses and homeowners to reduce allergies, minimize hazards, and improve aesthetics. A pressure washer is used to clean residential surfaces such as gutters, roofs, decks, paved areas, siding, cladding, and windows. They are also used to clean commercial surfaces in places such as office buildings, churches, schools, hospitals, and other large buildings.

== Equipment ==
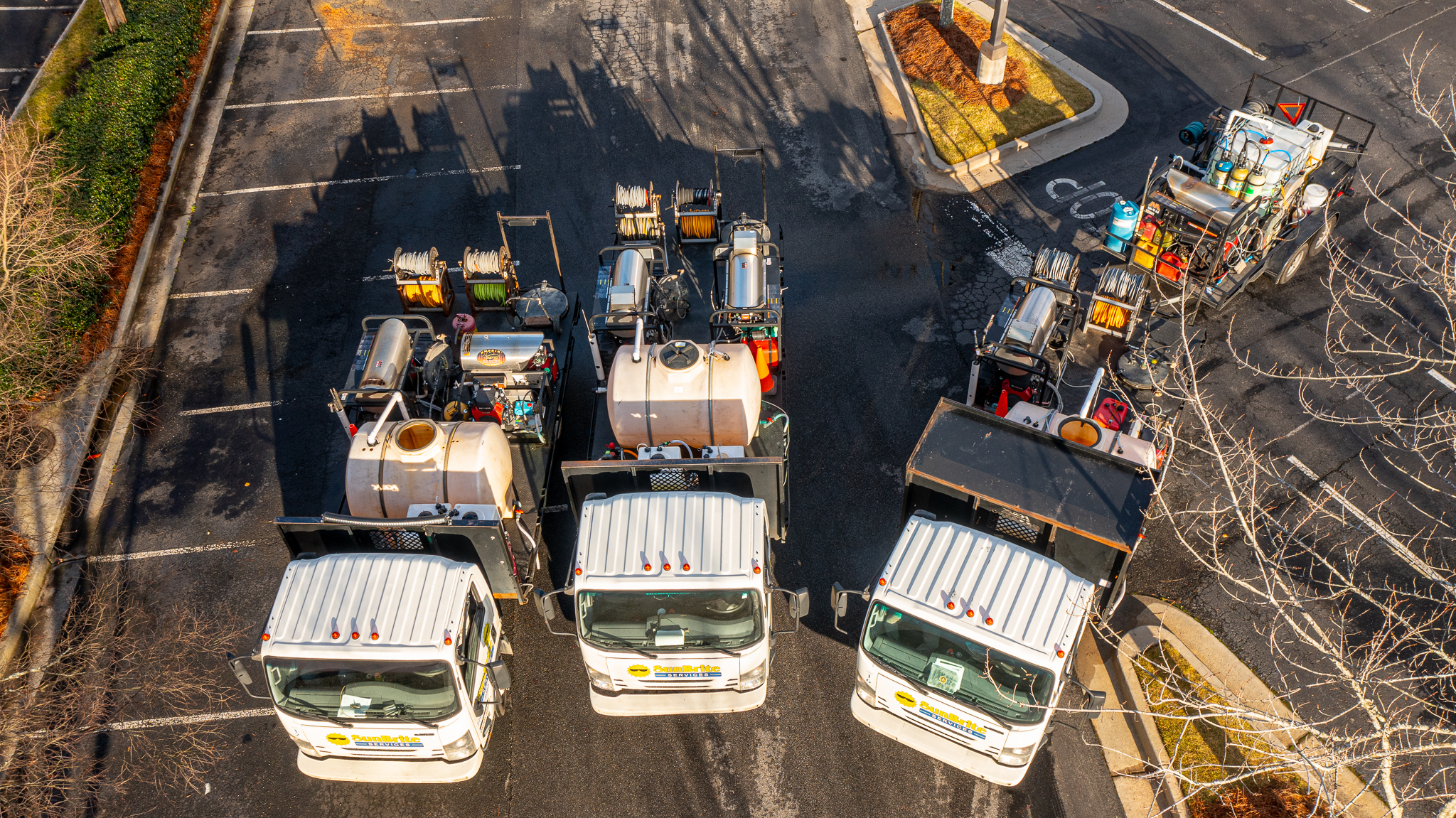
Commercial pressure-washing trucks, set up with 2 hot-water machines each, and a window-cleaning trailer.

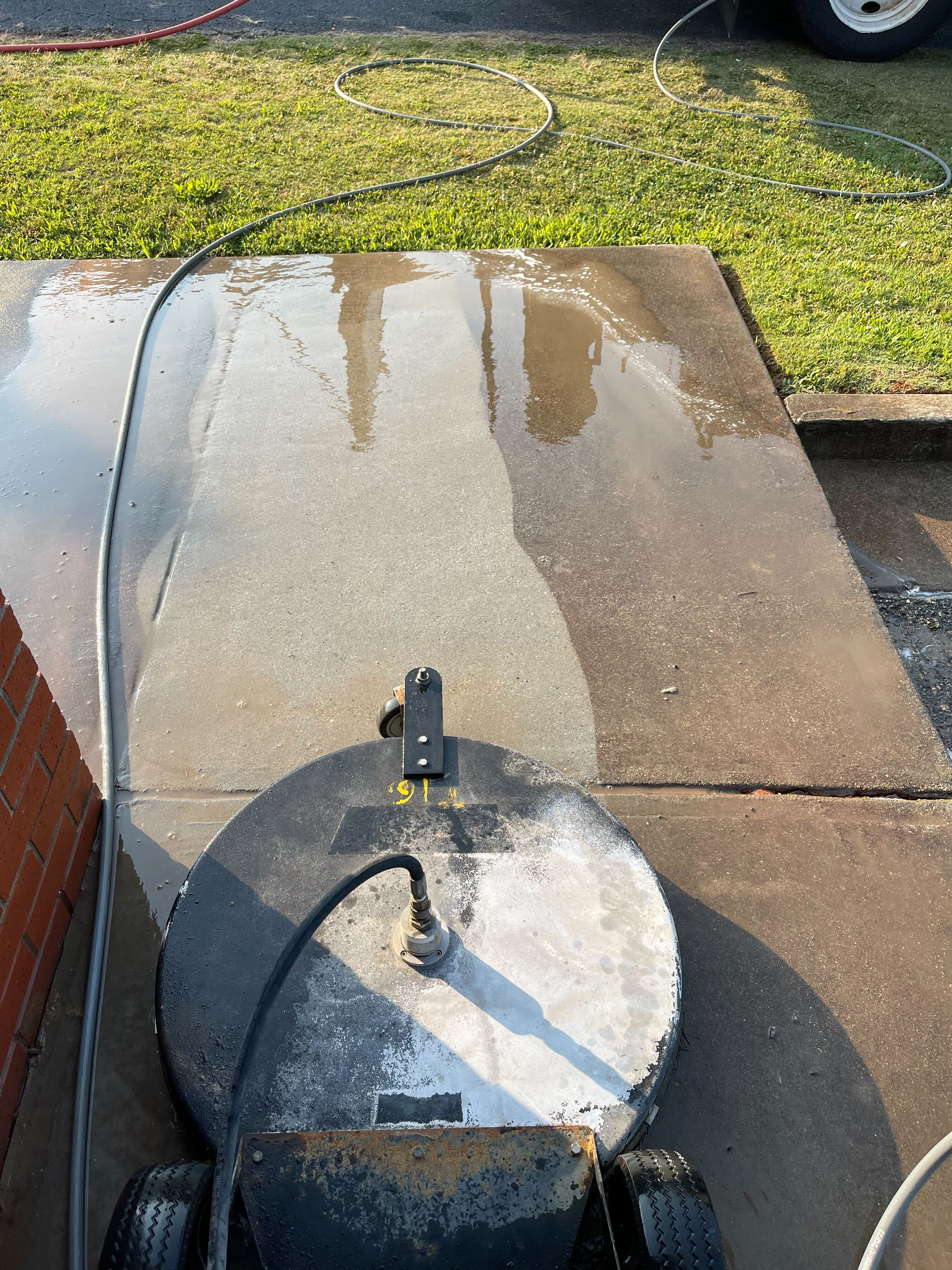
Concrete cleaning with a surface cleaner.

There are two main types of pressure washers: hot-water pressure washers and cold-water pressure washers. Each have their own purpose. Hot-water pressure washers are best for washing flatwork (concrete driveways, walkways, etc.) that can have grease or oil residue. They are best to use when cleaning parking garages, drive-throughs (such as for fast-food restaurants) and gas stations. Hot water is supplied using a burner unit. It helps emulsify grease and oil on surfaces, assisting in removing them more quickly. Cold-water machines are most commonly used to wash residential areas: siding, gutters, roofs, decks, and windows can all be cleaned effectively with them.

Surface cleaners are pressure-wash tools that facilitate the even cleaning of larger flat surface areas. There are many models available that attach to the end of a pressure washer wand. A surface cleaner has a disc-shaped housing covering a rotating bar with a nozzle at each end. In use, the high-pressure water is split into two streams which emerge through nozzles at the ends of the bar, directing the jets against the surface to be cleaned and inducing rotation of the bar. When the unit is moved over the surface, the rotating jets clean a swathe slightly smaller than the circular cover, which confines splashback and reduces noise. Larger models may have casters to maintain clearance and allow easy control of movement over reasonably smooth surfaces. Smaller versions may rely on a ring of plastic bristles for the same purpose. The water enters the surface cleaner through a trigger gun at the top of the handle bar, travels through a hose, the swivel, and the bar, ending up passing through specifically sized nozzles to spray the surface and remove dirt and grime.

== Nozzles ==
Pressure washer nozzles alter the direction of flow and velocity of the water. Nozzles allow users to reach a greater distance or apply more pressure to a difficult-to-clean surface. Nozzles are color-coded for easy identification, with black nozzles covering the widest degree (65°) and red nozzles covering the least (0°). Great care should be taken when using a 0° nozzle as it can cause injury to both the user and passersby, as well as damage to surfaces. Nozzles are sized based on the flow rate (GPM) and delivery pressure (PSI) of the machine.

== High-pressure water jetting ==
High-pressure water jetting, also called hydrojetting, hydroblasting, or ultra-high pressure washing/cleaning, is a variation in which the pressure can be significantly higher (up to 1,400 bars (20,000 psi)) than consumer models, and is sufficiently hazardous that special precautions are necessary for acceptable safety. High-pressure water jetting also has applications in cutting a wide range of materials with very low heat input or dust production, and can be effective underwater.

Some advantages of this technology for use in the oil and gas production industry are that it has a low fire and explosion hazard and the waste products are relatively easy to dispose of. It is used for cleaning tanks, pipes, sieves, filters and heat exchangers; for removal of coatings, corrosion products, scale, old paint, burned materials, biological fouling; and many other insoluble substances, with little or no damage to the substrate when the appropriate pressure is used. These procedures can be done above and under water.

== See also ==
- Briggs & Stratton – American manufacturing company
- Kärcher – German cleaning equipment and systems company
- Nilfisk – Danish cleaning equipment company
- Reverse graffiti – Method of creating images on surfaces by removing dirt
- Washdown
