= List of lakes of New York =

This is a list of lakes in the state of New York in the United States. Swimming, fishing, and/or boating are permitted in some of these lakes, but not all.

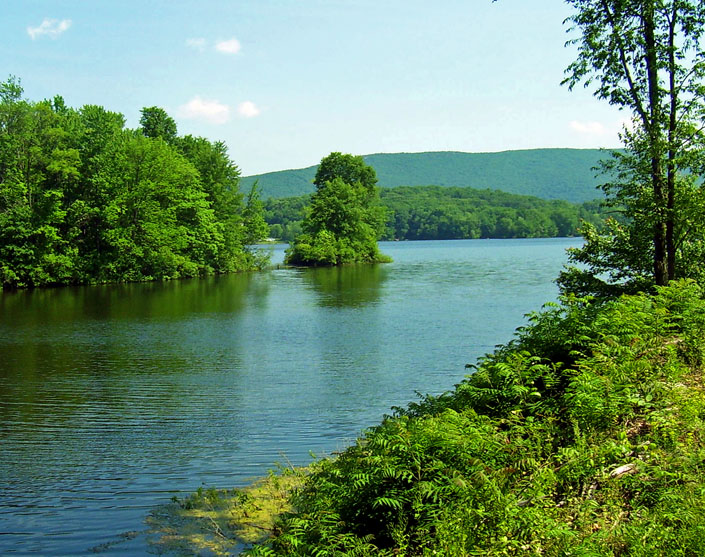
Beaver Dam Lake

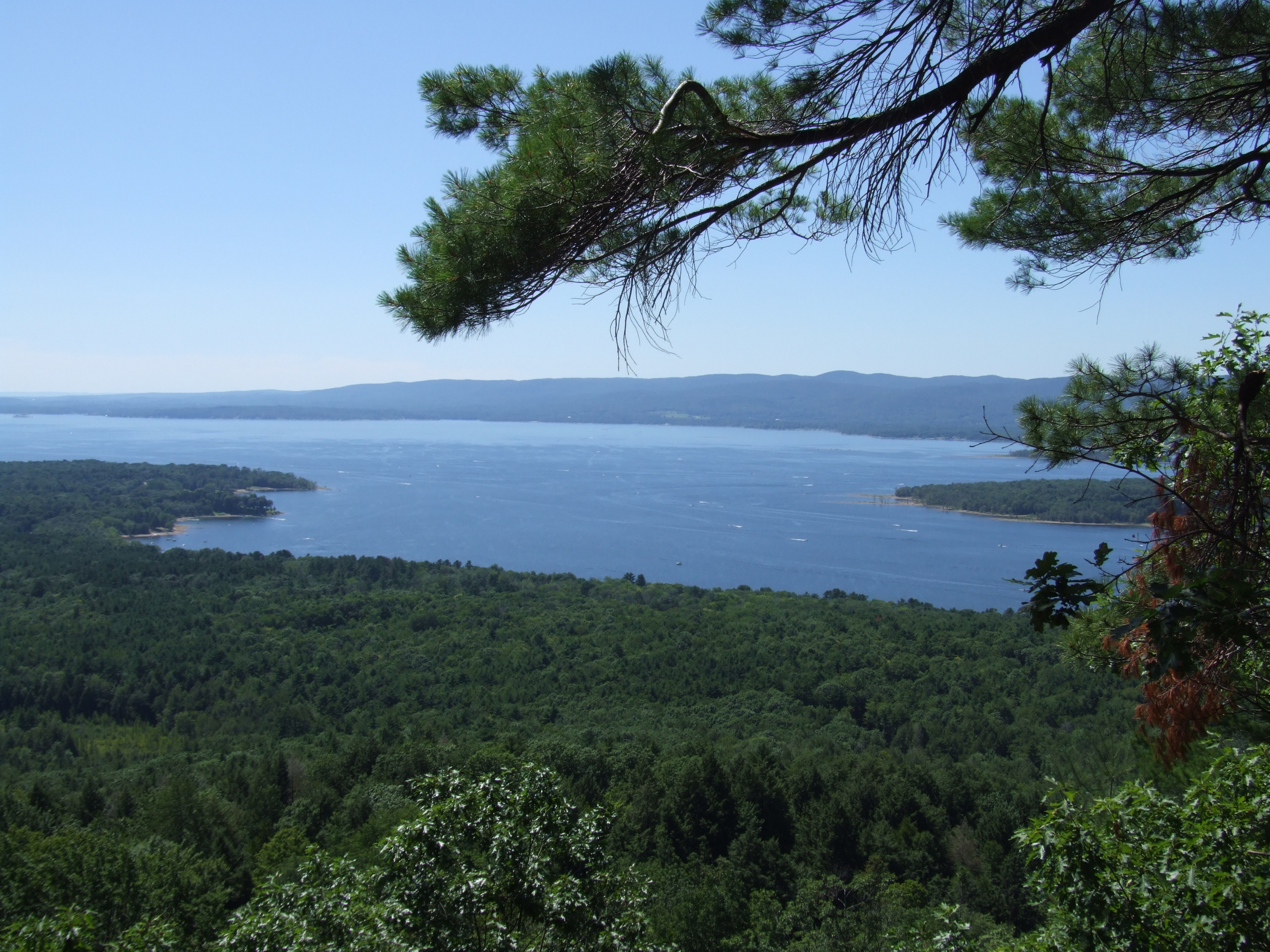
Great Sacandaga Lake

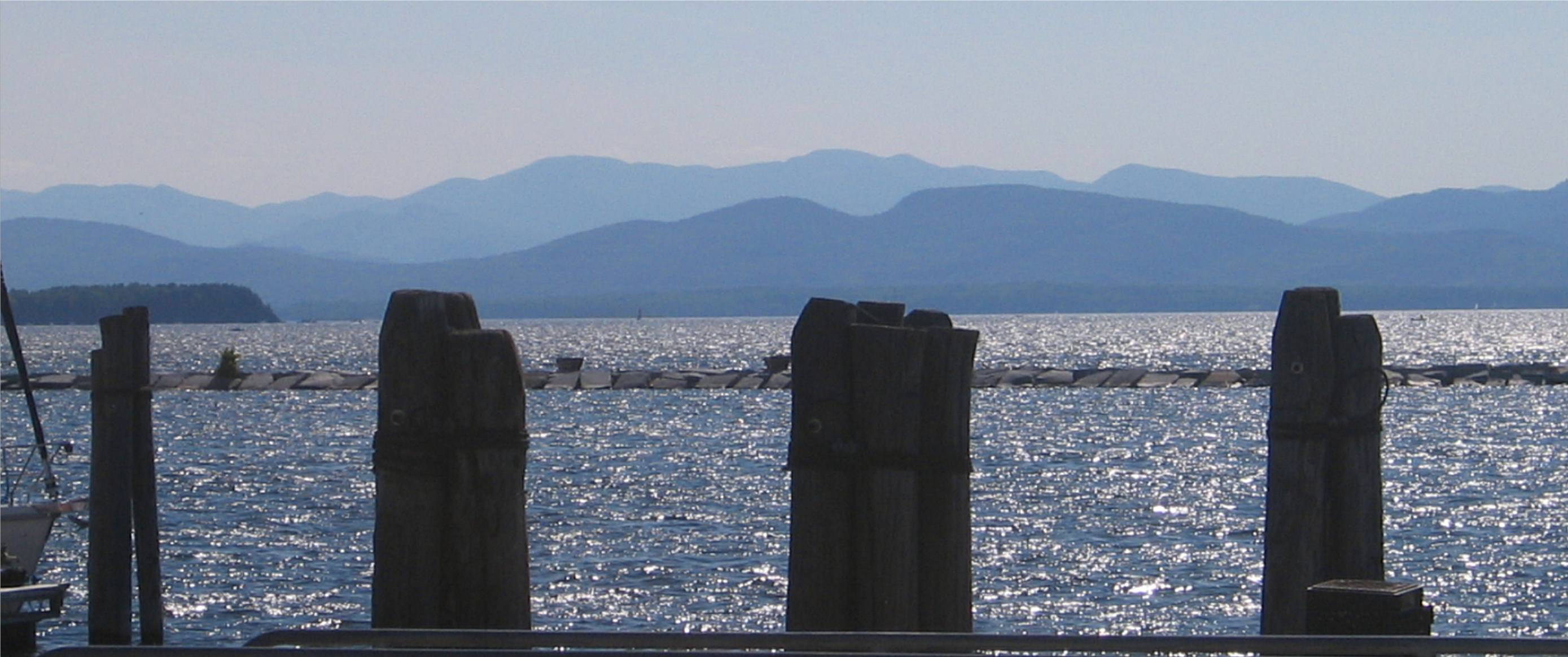
Lake Champlain

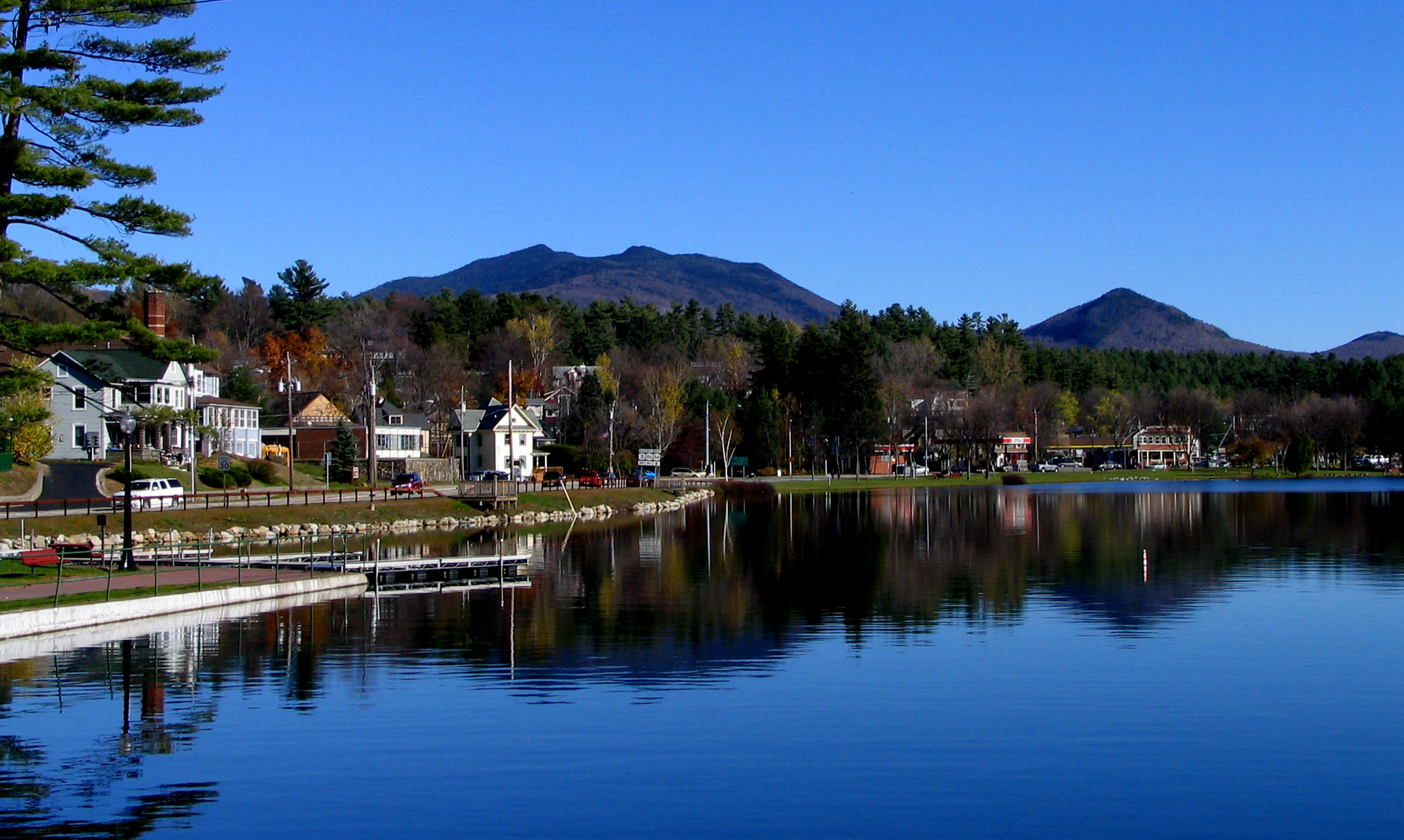
Lake Flower

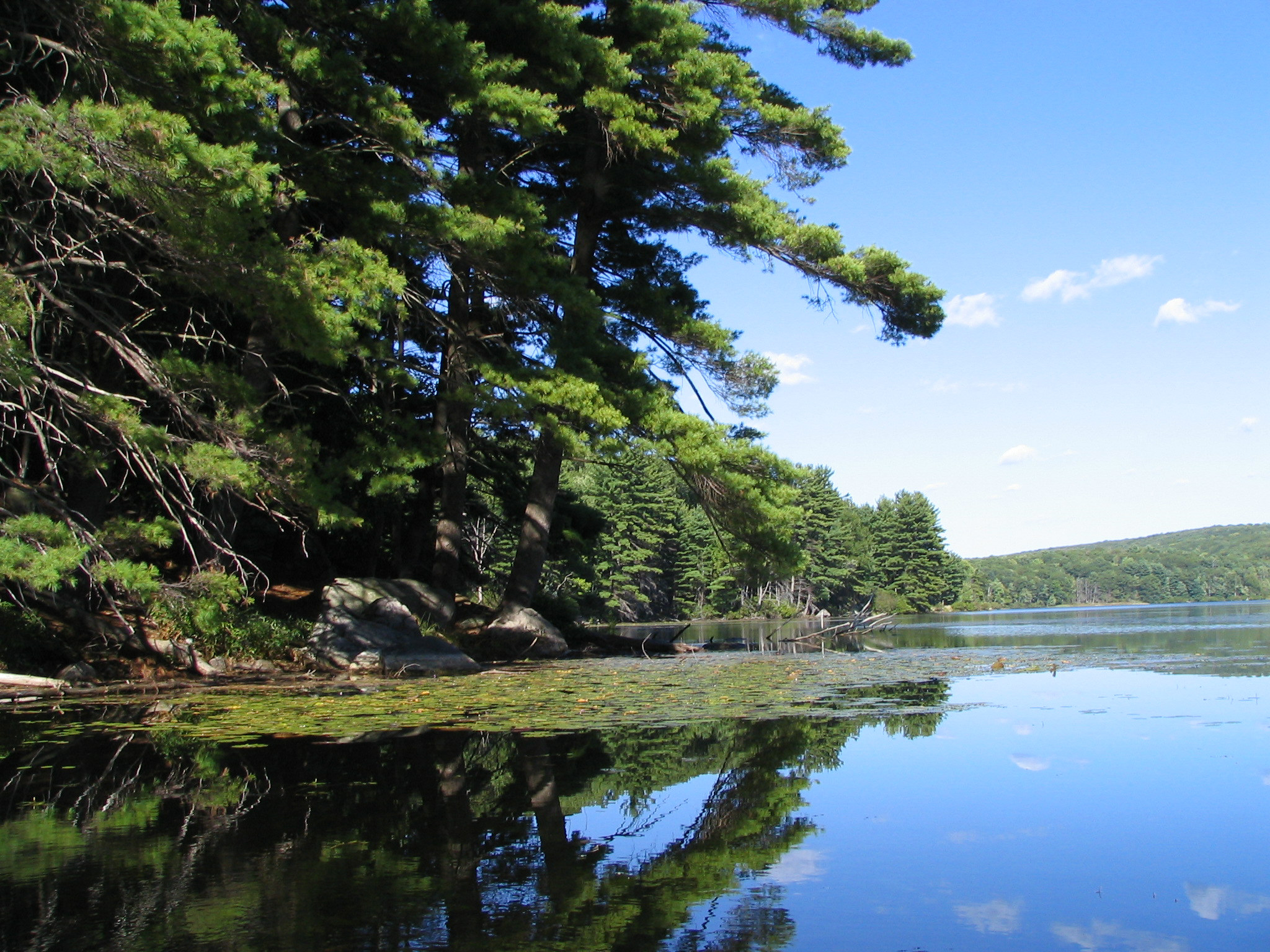
Lake Kanawauke

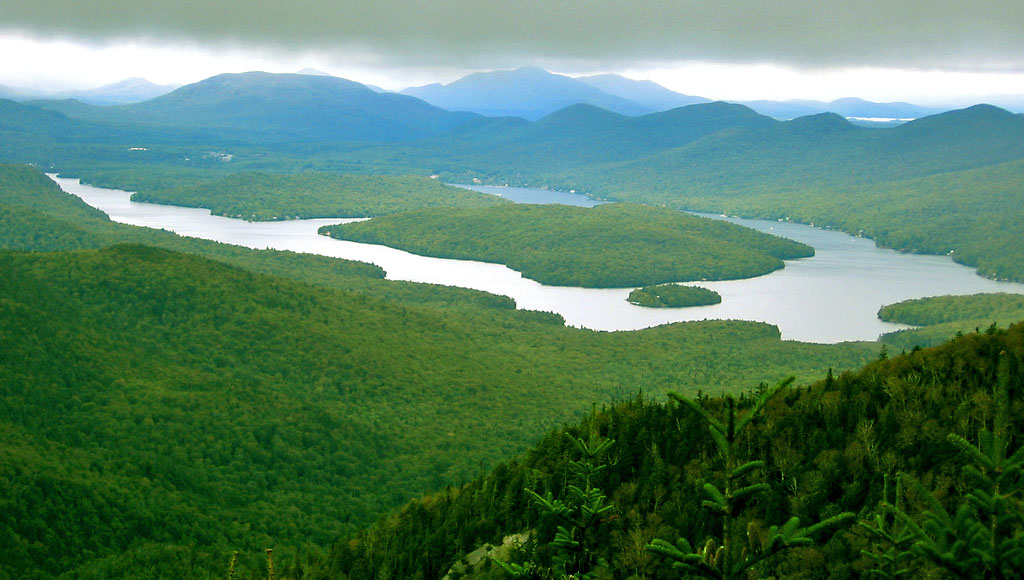
Lake Placid

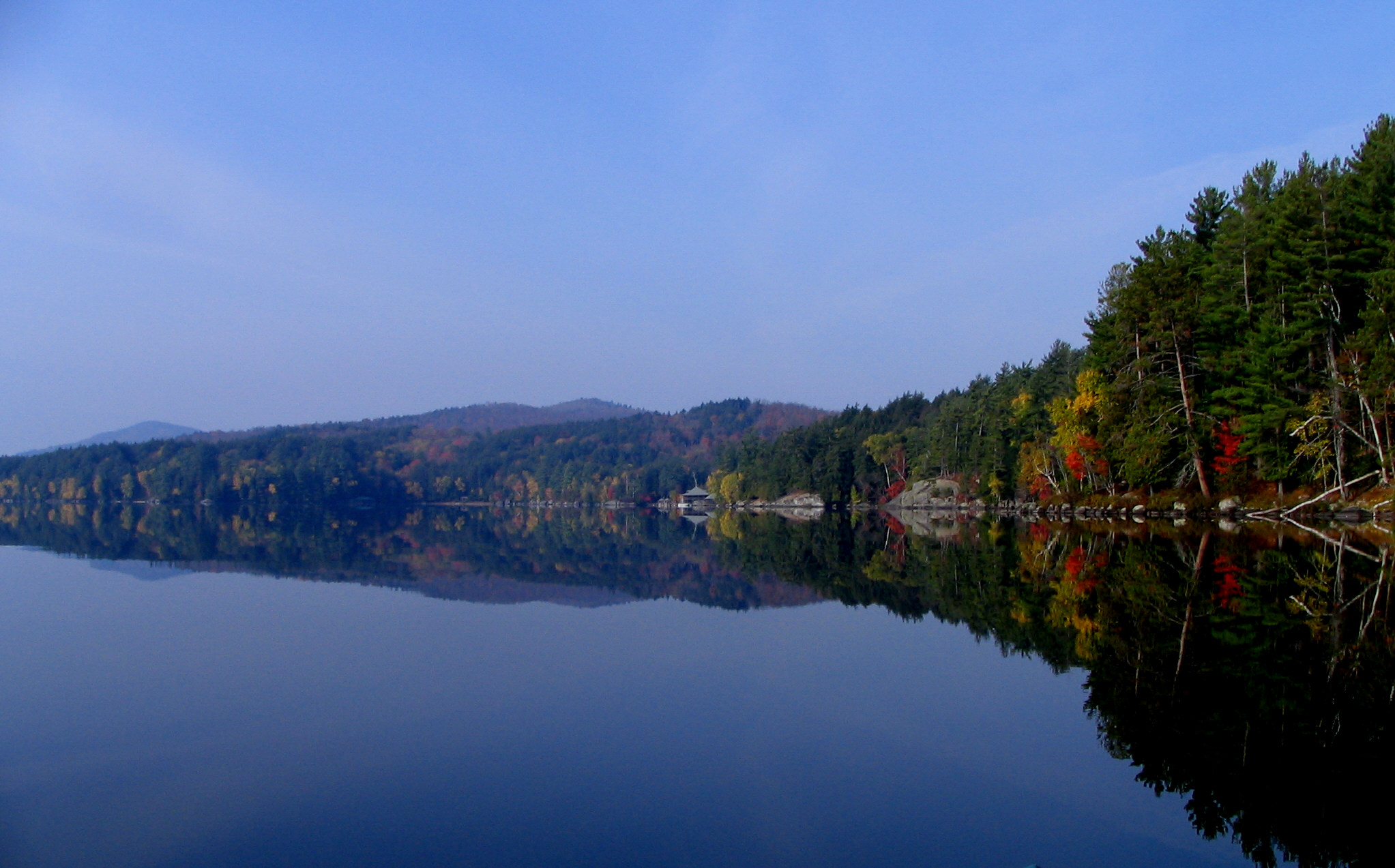
Lower Saranac Lake

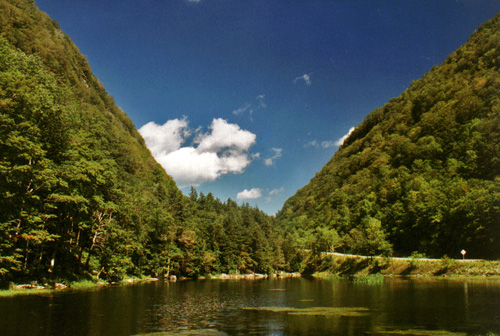
Notch Lake

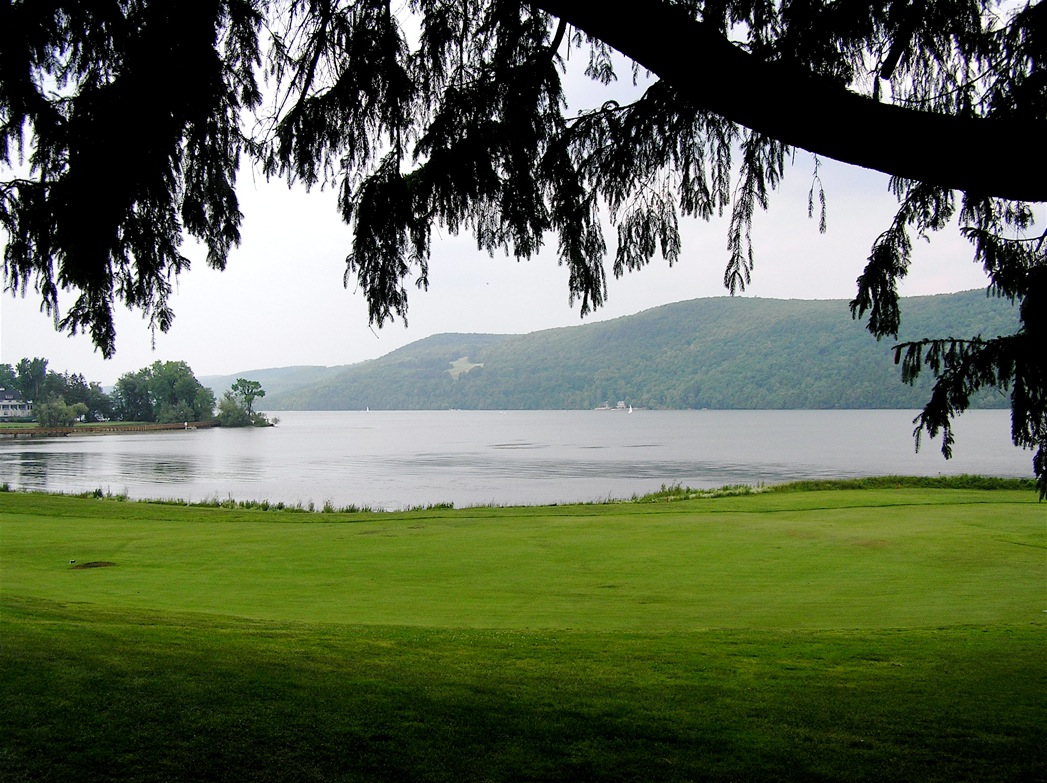
Lake Otsego

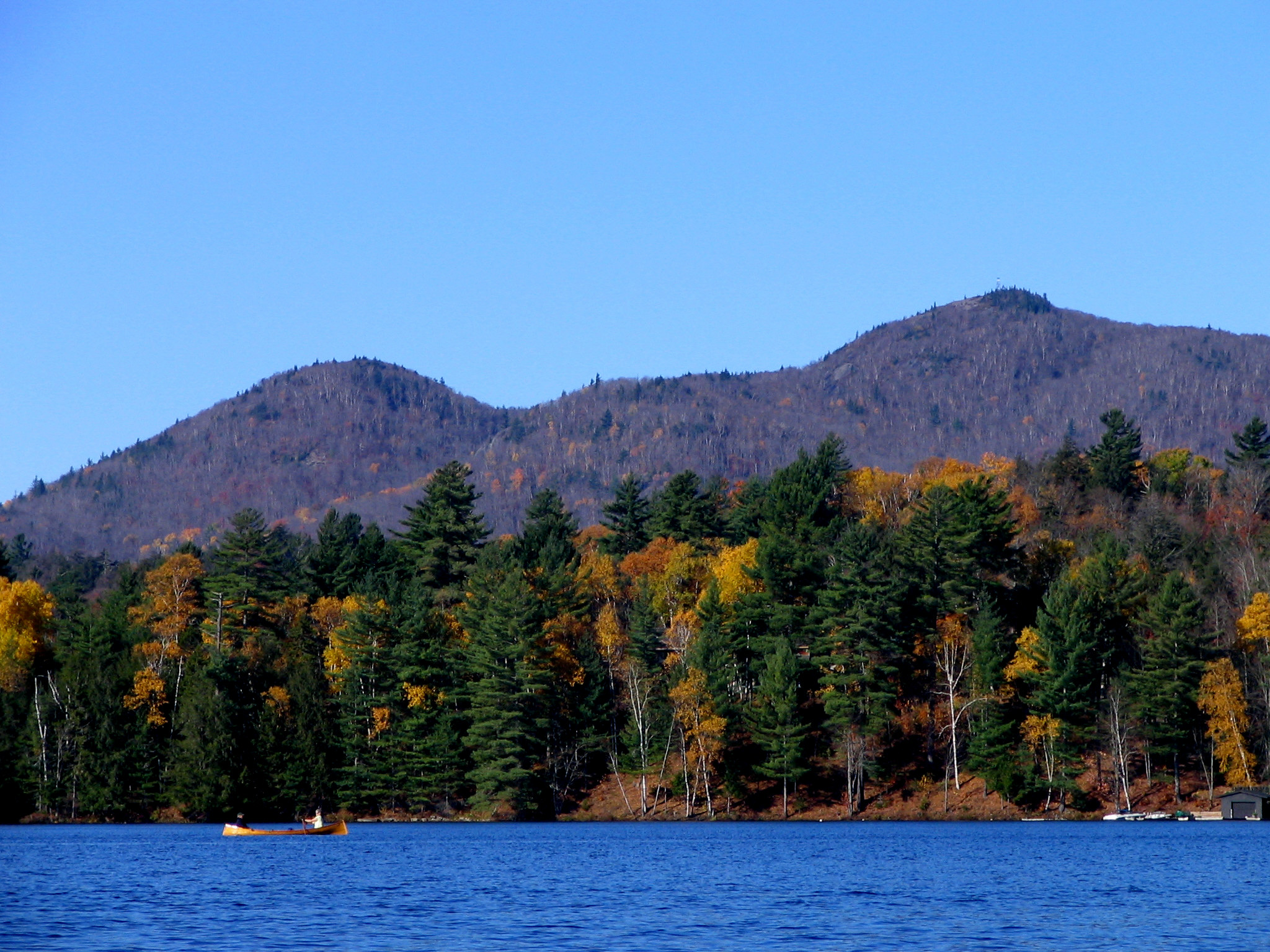
Upper St. Regis Lake

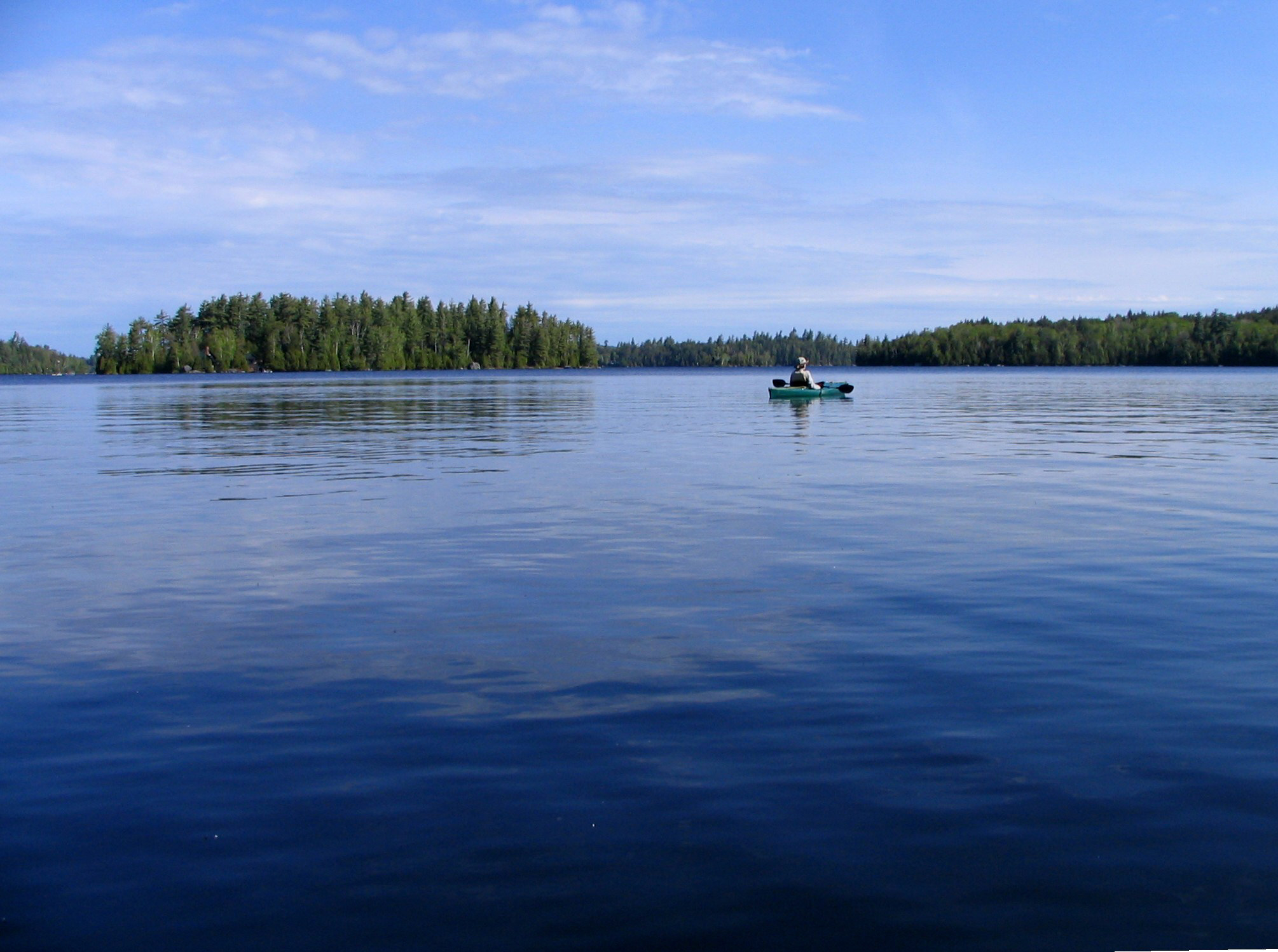
Upper Saranac Lake looking north

- Adirondack Lake
- Ampersand Lake
- Atwood Lake
- Avalanche Lake
- Augur Lake
- Babcock Lake
- Bailey Pond
- Ballston Lake
- Basket Pond
- Bass Lake
- Bear Cub Pond
- Beaver Dam Lake
- Big Diamond Pond
- Big Moose Lake
- Blackfoot Pond
- Black Lake
- Blue Mountain Lake
- Brantingham Lake
- Brydon Lake
- Buck Horn Lake
- Busfield Pond
- Cables Lake
- East Canada Lake
- West Canada Lake
- Canadice Lake
- Canaan Lake
- Canadarago Lake
- Canandaigua Lake
- Canopus Lake
- Caroga Lake
- Catlin Lake
- Cayuga Lake
- Cayuta Lake
- Cazenovia Lake
- Chadwick Lake
- Chateaugay Lake
- Chautauqua Lake
- Chazy Lake
- China Pond
- Chisholm Pond
- Clapper Lake
- Columbia Lake
- Combs Lake
- Conesus Lake
- Cossayuna Lake
- Cranberry Lake
- Cross Lake
- Dart Lake
- Lake Delaware
- Delta Lake
- Duck Lake
- Dwight Pond
- Eagle Lake, Essex County
- Eagle Lake, Hamilton County
- Eagle Lake, Orange County
- East Caroga Lake
- Elk Lake
- Elm Lake
- Elm Swamp
- Emmons Pond
- Featherstonhaugh Lake
- Fern Lake
- Finger Lakes
- Forked Lake
- Fulton Chain Lakes
- Galway Lake
- Garnet Lake
- Genesee Lake
- Great Sacandaga Lake
- Green Lake
- Greenwood Lake (extends into New Jersey)
- Harris Lake
- Hathaway Pond
- Heart Lake
- Hedges Lake
- Henderson Lake
- Hemlock Lake
- Hempstead Lake
- Hiawatha Lake
- Hicks Pond
- Honeoye Lake
- Huggins Lake
- Indian Lake
- Kendall Pond
- Keuka Lake
- Kiwassa Lake
- Labrador pond
- Lake Abanakee
- Lake Algonquin
- Lake Ann
- Lake Bonaparte
- Lake Bonita
- Lake Carmel
- Lake Champlain
- Lake Clear
- Lake Colden
- Lake Durant
- Lake Edward
- Lake Erie
- Lake Flower
- Lake George
- Lake Gilead
- Lake Gleneida
- Lake Kanawauke
- Lake Kushaqua
- Lake Lila
- Lake Louise Marie
- Lake Madeline
- Lake Maratanza
- Lake Neatahwanta
- Lake Ontario
- Lake Oscawana
- Lake Ozonia
- Lake Peekskill
- Lake Placid
- Lake Pleasant
- Lake Ronkonkoma
- Lake Sebago
- Lake Skanatani / Skannatani (official spelling varies)
- Lake Taghkanic
- Lake Tappan
- Lake Tear of the Clouds
- Lake Tiorati
- Lake Tittykuku
- Lake Titus
- Lake Washington
- Lake Welsh
- Lamoka Lake
- Lewey Lake
- Little Sacandaga
- Little Tupper Lake
- Long Lake
- Loon Lake (Franklin County, New York)
- Loon Lake (Steuben County, New York)
- Loon Lake (Warren County, New York)
- Lower Ausable Lake
- Lower Chateaugay Lake
- Lower St. Regis Lake
- Lower Saranac Lake
- Lows Lake
- Mason Lake
- Masten Lake
- Meacham Lake
- Middle Saranac Lake
- Mirror Lake
- Mohegan Lake
- Mountain Lake
- Mud Lake (more than 30 in New York)
- Murphy Lake
- Nanticoke Lake (Broome County, New York)
- Nassau Lake, Rensselaer County
- Newcomb Lake
- North Lake
- North-South Lake
- Notch Lake
- Oneida Lake
- Onondaga Lake
- Onteora Lake
- Oseetah Lake
- Otisco Lake
- Otsego Lake
- Oquaga Lake
- Owasco Lake
- Oxbow Lake
- Paradox Lake
- Perch Lake (Delaware County, New York)
- Perch Lake
- Pine Pond
- Pleasant Lake
- Queechy Lake
- Ragged Lake
- Rainbow Lake
- Raquette Lake
- Rich Lake
- Rockland Lake
- Rondax Lake
- Round Lake
- Rushford Lake
- Sacandaga Lake
- Schroon Lake
- Saratoga Lake
- Seneca Lake
- Seven Hills Lake
- Sleepy Hollow Lake
- Star Lake
- Silver Lake (Clinton County)
- Silver Lake (Sullivan County)
- Silver Lake (Wyoming County)
- Skaneateles Lake
- Snowbird Lake
- Snyder's Lake
- South Lake
- Spring Lake (Delaware County)
- Spring Lake (Rensselaer County)
- Sterling Lake
- Summit Lake (Edmeston)
- Summit Lake (Philmont)
- Summit Lake (Springfield)
- Taylor Pond
- The Lake (Central Park, New York County)
- Tomahawk Lake
- Tonetta Lake
- Triangle Lake
- Tripp Lake
- Trout Lake (Warren County, New York)
- Trout Lake (Arietta, Hamilton County, New York)
- Trout Lake (Morehouse, Hamilton County, New York)
- Tsatsawassa Lake, Nassau, Rensselaer County, New York
- Tupper Lake
- Upper Ausable Lake
- Upper Chateaugay Lake
- Upper St. Regis Lake
- Upper Saranac Lake
- Utowana Lake
- Wanaksink Lake
- Wanita Lake
- Wawaka Lake
- White Lake
- Wildwood Lake
- Wolf Lake
- Yankee Lake

== See also ==
- List of dams and reservoirs in New York
- List of rivers of New York
- List of mountains in New York
