= Hathaway Pond =

- Location of Hathaway Pond within New York
- Location: Delaware County, New York
- Coordinates: 42°03′50″N 75°16′57″W
- Type: Lake
- Basin countries: United States
- Surface area: 12 acres (4.9 ha)
- Surface elevation: 1,631 ft (497 m)
- Settlements: Rock Rift

Hathaway Pond is a small lake located west-southwest of the hamlet of Rock Rift in Delaware County, New York. Hathaway Pond drains south via an unnamed creek that flows into Sands Creek. Russell Lake is located west of Hathaway Pond.

== See also ==
- List of lakes in New York
