= Perch Lake =

Perch Lake may refer to:

- Perch Lake, a lake in Blue Earth County, Minnesota
- Perch Lake, a lake in Le Sueur County, Minnesota
- Perch Lake, a lake in Lincoln County, Minnesota
- Perch Lake, a lake in Martin County, Minnesota
- Perch Lake (Delaware County, New York), a lake in Delaware County, New York
- Perch Lake (New York), a lake in Jefferson County, New York
