= Robert Pruyn =

Robert Pruyn may refer to:

- Robert H. Pruyn (1815–1882), American politician and diplomat and father of Robert C. Pruyn
- Robert C. Pruyn (1847–1934), American businessman and son of Robert H. Pruyn
