= Elm Swamp =

- Location of Elm Swamp within New York
- Location: Delaware County, New York
- Coordinates: 41°55′20″N 75°08′41″W
- Type: Lake
- Basin countries: United States
- Surface area: 20 acres (8.1 ha)
- Surface elevation: 1,631 feet (497 m)
- Settlements: Lewbeach

Elm Swamp is a small lake located northeast of the hamlet of Lewbeach in Delaware County, New York. Elm Swamp drains south via an unnamed creek that flows into Pea Brook.

== See also ==
- List of lakes in New York
