= Snowy Mountain (New York) =

Mountain in New York, United States

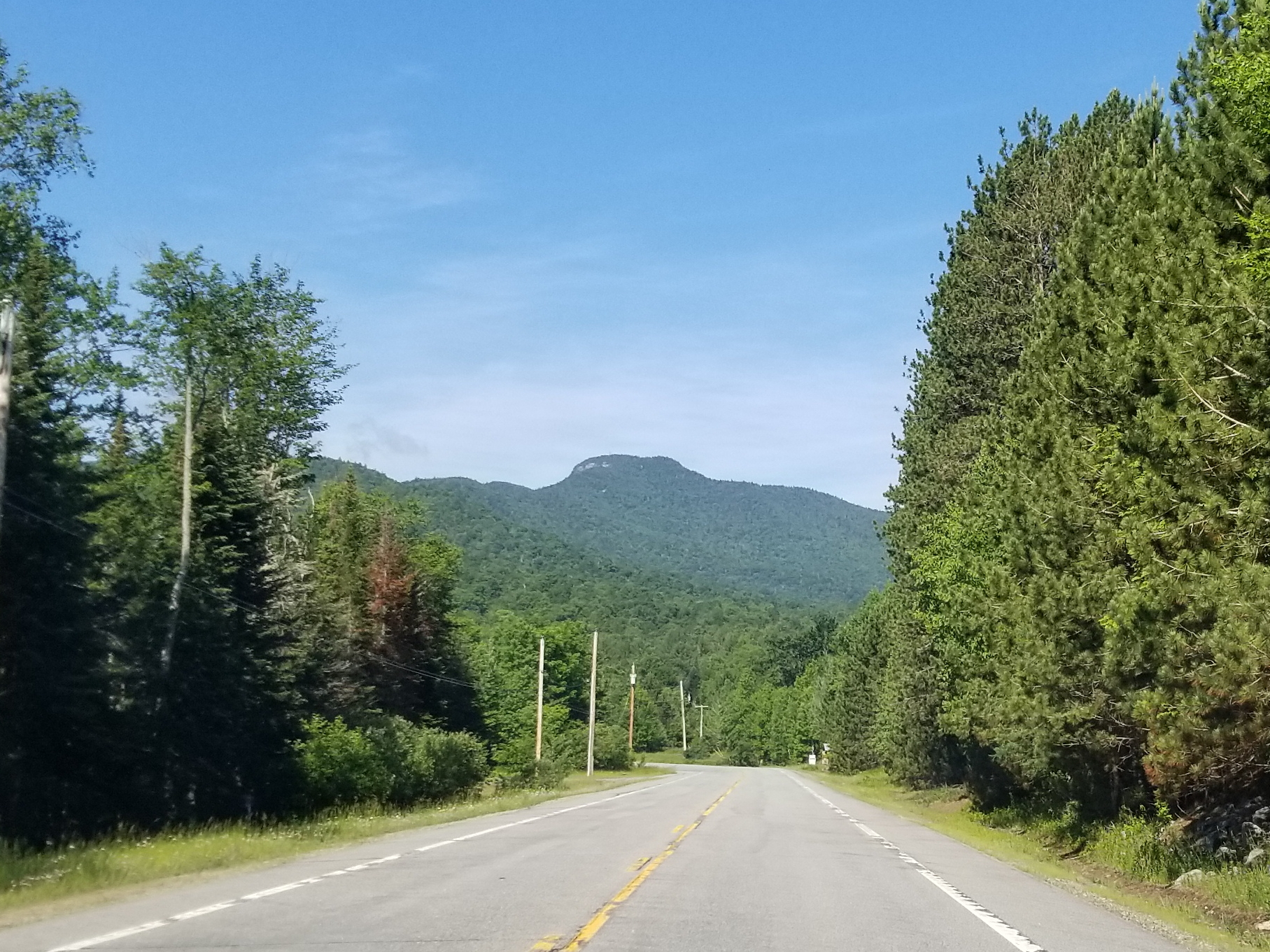
- Snowy Mountain as viewed from the north on NY Route 30

Highest point
- Elevation: 3,899 ft (1,188 m) NGVD 29
- Prominence: 2,225 ft (678 m)
- Listing: New York County High Points 5th
- Coordinates: 43°42′01″N 74°23′10″W

Geography
- Location within New York Adirondack Park Location within the United States
- Location: Hamilton County, New York
- Parent range: Adirondack Mountains
- Topo map: USGS Snowy Mountain

Snowy Mountain is a mountain located in Hamilton County, New York. Initially known as 'Squaw Bonnet', its summit is the highest point in the county. While most maps show the elevation as 3899 feet, some suggest that more recent surveys have it as 3904 feet or even 3908 feet.

== Description ==
The mountain is the highest in the Adirondack Mountains south of the 4,000 ft (1,200 m) High Peaks region. It is one of thirteen mountains in New York with more than 2,000 ft (610 m) of topographic prominence. Snowy Mountain is flanked to the northeast by Beaver Mountain (3239 feet), and to the southwest by Lewey Mountain (3742 feet). A subsidiary ridge comes off the summit to the east ending at unnamed 'Peak 3149' (3149 feet) which forms the head of a large bowl overlooking the Griffin Brook drainage.

Snowy Mountain stands within the watershed of the Hudson River, which drains into New York Bay. The south end of the northwest side of Snowy Mountain drains into Little Squaw Brook, thence into the Cedar River, and the Hudson River. The north side of Snowy Mountain drains into Squaw Brook, thence into Indian Lake, Lake Abanakee, the Indian River, and the Hudson River. The northeast end of Snowy Mountain drains into Beaver Brook, thence into Indian Lake. The southeast slopes of Snowy Mountain drain into Indian Lake via Griffin Brook, Forks Brook, Willow Brook, and Falls Brook.

It is the location of the recently restored Snowy Mountain Fire Observation Station, i.e. 'fire tower', listed on the National Register of Historic Places in 2001. In 1909, after the disastrous forest fires of 1903 and 1908, New York State began erecting observation towers on strategically located peaks, such as Snowy Mountain, as part of a comprehensive forest fire suppression program for the Adirondack Mountains. That year a fifteen foot high log tower and a small log cabin were erected on the summit of Snowy Mountain. A telephone line was strung from the tower to Indian Lake village, a distance of 11 1/2 miles. Upon sighting smoke, the observer would call in the location of a suspected forest fire. With reports from observers on other nearby mountains, the exact location of the fire could be calculated by triangulation and fire suppression crews dispatched most expeditiously. In 1917, a steel tower 22 feet high replaced the log tower. In 1933, the steel tower was raised 33 feet so observers could see over the surrounding trees (one must assume that Verplanck Colvin and his men cleared the summit of most, if not all, trees in 1872 for triangulation sightings to distant peaks during the Adirondack Survey). In 1971, the Snowy Mountain fire tower was closed when NYS decided that it was unnecessary for protecting the Adirondack Park from forest fires (airplanes could do the job equally well). Several years later (it was there in 1986, but gone in 2006), the observer's cabin was removed.

Due to its high elevation and the restored fire tower, Snowy Mountain is a popular hiking destination. While the trip is nearly an eight-mile walk involving more than 2000 feet of elevation gain, many find its views well worth the effort.

While the history of ascending this peak is surely incomplete, this much is known: The earliest known ascent is said to have been in 1771 by Archibald Campbell, a surveyor from Albany, NY. In that year, Joseph Totten and Stephen Crossfield were negotiating the purchase of a huge land tract from the Mohawk Nation (Six Nation Confederacy) for Edward and Ebenezer Jessup who had great influence with Sir William Johnson, NY Governor Dunmore and General Tryon. One can imagine that Campbell was dispatched to the area to find out something about what was being purchased. Verplanck Colvin and his crew climbed it on 4 August 1872 for the Adirondack Survey. Mills Blake, Colvin's assistant, and his crew climbed it again ten years later on 7 November 1882 to complete some triangulations, again for the Adirondack Survey. One might wonder about their itinerary for they were again on the summit on 9 and 10 November. Due to the four mile approach, it seems likely that the survey crew bivouacked on the summit at least for the last two days. There is some speculation that Colvin may have been among the group on the 9th. While technically not 'winter', some consider this to be the earliest known 'winter' ascent. Colvin made his second (perhaps 3rd) ascent of this peak on 22 June 1885 when he certainly bivouacked on the summit.

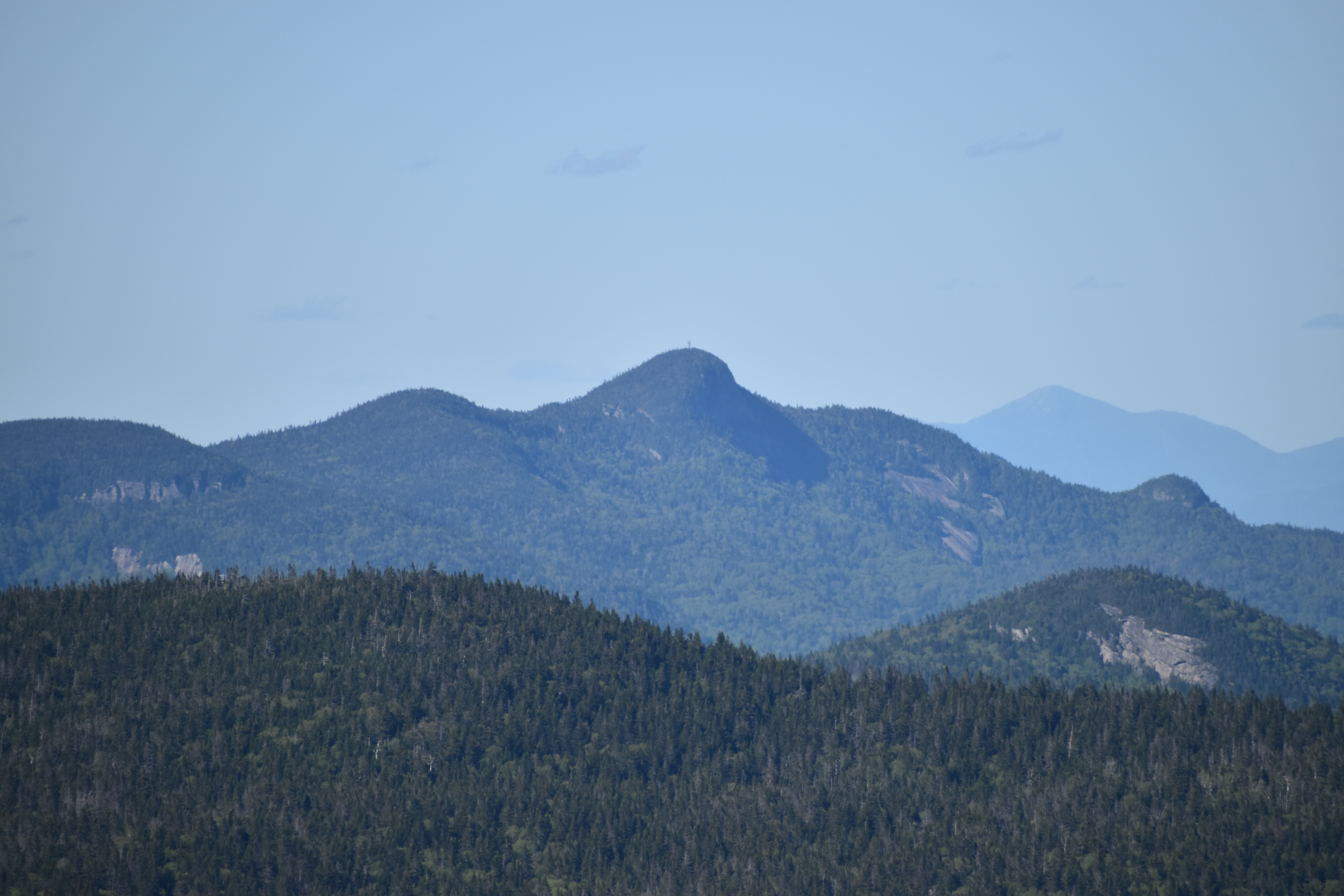
View of Snowy Mountain from Pillsbury Mountain in May 2021

It is not known when the hiking trail was built, but one can imagine that it may have existed before the fire tower in 1909.

Rockclimbing at Snowy Mountain: In the mid-1990s, the peak was visited by Neal Knitel and Jonas Morelli who attempted a route on the left side of the summit cliff. They never returned to complete their route because "it was too far and there was other stuff to do." In 2002, unbeknownst to each other, two parties began working climbing routes at Snowy Mountain: Karl Swisher and Sid Perkins, and Ed Palen and Bob Starinsky. By 2008, seven high quality routes had been put up. All are bolt-protected face climbing on highly featured rock.

Part-way up the Griffin Brook drainage toward Peak 3149, lie the Snowy Mountain Boulders, a unique collection of boulders featuring the largest collection of huecos in the Adirondack Park. This unique bouldering area was initially noticed by Dave Buzzelli in 2003 while on the approach to the slides on Peak 3149 for skiing. Over 40 bouldering problems have been put up here since 2006.

== See also ==
- List of mountains in New York
