= Basket Pond =

Lake in New York, United States

- Location of Basket Pond within New York
- Location: Delaware County, New York
- Coordinates: 41°55′18″N 75°05′31″W
- Surface area: 21 acres (0.033 mi^{2}; 8.5 ha)
- Surface elevation: 1,703 feet (519 m)
- Settlements: Rock Valley

Basket Pond is a small lake north-northwest of Rock Valley in Delaware County, New York. It drains south via an unnamed creek which flows into the North Branch Basket Creek.

== See also ==
- List of lakes in New York
