= Busfield Pond =

Lake in New York, United States

- Location of Busfield Pond within New York
- Location: Delaware County, New York
- Coordinates: 41°57′44″N 75°16′59″W
- Surface area: 2 acres (0.0031 mi^{2}; 0.81 ha)
- Surface elevation: 1,017 feet (310 m)
- Settlements: Hancock

Busfield Pond is a small lake located north of Hancock in Delaware County, New York. Busfield Pond drains south via an unnamed creek that flows into Sands Creek.

== See also ==
- List of lakes in New York
