= Miami River (New York) =

River in New York, United States

The Miami River is a 13.7-mile-long (22.0 km) stream in upstate New York and is a part of the Hudson River watershed. The river's headwaters rise in the Adirondack Mountains at 43°36′11″N 74°30′12″W about 10 miles (16 km) northwest of Speculator and flows southeast for about 3 miles (5 km) with Pillsbury Mountain on the southwest and Page Mountain to the northeast. It turns sharply southwest for about one mile and then turns sharply east for about a mile, after which it flows mostly northeast for about 8 miles (13 km) before flowing into Lewey Lake at 43°37′58″N 74°24′17″W. Lewey Lake empties into Indian Lake, which is drained by the Indian River, which then flows into the Hudson River approximately 17 miles (27 km) to the northeast of Lewey Lake.

== See also ==
- List of rivers of New York
