= Spectacle Lake (Herkimer County, New York) =

Lake in New York, United States

- Location of Spectacle Lake within New York
- Location: Herkimer County, New York
- Coordinates: 43°22′04″N 74°54′07″W
- Surface elevation: 1,388 feet (423 m)
- Settlements: Wilmurt

Spectacle Lake is a small lake southeast of Wilmurt in Herkimer County, New York. It drains northwest via an unnamed creek that flows into West Canada Creek. Butler Lake is located west of Spectacle Lake.

== See also ==
- List of lakes in New York
