= Butler Lake =

Lake in Herkimer County, New York, United States

- Location of Butler Lake within New York
- Location: Herkimer County, New York
- Coordinates: 43°22′00″N 75°54′44″W
- Surface area: 11 acres (0.017 mi^{2}; 4.5 ha)
- Surface elevation: 679 feet (207 m)
- Settlements: Wilmurt

Butler Lake is a small lake south of Wilmurt in Herkimer County, New York. It drains north via an unnamed creek that flows into West Canada Creek. Butler Lake is home to a pair of loons who migrate in each spring to rear their young. The lake is only just large enough as they require a "long runway" of water from which to take off. Atwood Lake is located east of Butler Lake.

== See also ==
- List of lakes in New York
