= Blackfoot Pond =

- Location of Blackfoot Pond within New York
- Location: Herkimer County, New York
- Coordinates: 43°44′43″N 75°01′54″W
- Type: Lake
- Surface area: 32 acres (0.050 mi^{2}; 13 ha)
- Surface elevation: 1,923 feet (586 m)
- Settlements: Old Forge

Blackfoot Pond is a small lake northwest of Old Forge in Herkimer County, New York. It drains south via an unnamed creek which flows into Little Simon Pond.

== See also ==
- List of lakes in New York
