= Columbia Lake (New York) =

Lake in Delaware County, New York, US

- Location of Columbia Lake within New York
- Location: Delaware County, New York
- Coordinates: 42°02′58″N 75°22′34″W
- Surface area: 17 acres (0.027 mi^{2})
- Surface elevation: 1,509 feet (460 m)
- Settlements: Stilesville

Columbia Lake is a small lake southeast of Stilesville in Delaware County, New York. It drains southeast via an unnamed creek that flows into Silver Lake.

== See also ==
- List of lakes in New York
