= Dwight Pond =

- Location of Dwight Pond within New York
- Location: Herkimer County, New York
- Coordinates: 43°41′46″N 74°52′58″W
- Type: Lake
- Surface elevation: 1,834 feet (559 m)
- Settlements: Old Forge

Dwight Pond is a small lake east-southeast of Old Forge in Herkimer County, New York. It drains east via an unnamed creek which flows into Limekiln Creek.

== See also ==
- List of lakes in New York
