= Clapper Lake =

Lake in Delaware County, New York, United States

- Location of Clapper Lake within New York
- Location: Delaware County, New York
- Coordinates: 42°30′07″N 74°45′03″W
- Surface area: 12 acres (0.019 mi^{2})
- Surface elevation: 1,978 feet (603 m)
- Settlements: South Worcester

Clapper Lake is a small lake located south-southwest of the hamlet of South Worcester in Delaware County, New York. Clapper Lake drains northwest via an unnamed creek which flows into Charlotte Creek.

== See also ==
- List of lakes in New York
