= Nanticoke Lake =

- Nanticoke Lake Nanticoke Lake (the United States)
- Location: Nanticoke Lake Multiple Use Area, Lisle, in Broome County, New York
- Coordinates: 42.335°N 76.093°W
- Type: Artificial impoundment
- Etymology: Nanticoke tribe of American Indians
- Primary inflows: Tributary of Nanticoke Creek
- Primary outflows: Nanticoke Creek
- Basin countries: United States
- Built: 1970s
- First flooded: 1970s
- Max. length: 0.57 miles (0.92 km)
- Surface area: 46 acres (19 ha)
- Max. depth: 20 feet (6.1 m)
- Shore length^{1}: 1.4 miles (2.3 km)
- Surface elevation: 1,400 feet (430 m)
- Settlements: Lisle, New York
- ^{1} Shore length is not a well-defined measure.

Nanticoke Lake is a small artificial impoundment in Broome County, New York, United States. It is located within the Nanticoke Lake Multiple Use Area in the Town of Lisle and managed by the New York State Department of Environmental Conservation.

== Geography ==
Nanticoke Lake covers approximately 46 acres (19 ha) and lies at an elevation of about 1,400 feet (430 m). The shoreline extends roughly 1.4 miles (2.3 km), with a maximum depth near 20 feet (6.1 m). The site lies within the Nanticoke Lake Multiple Use Area, a 338 acres (137 ha) public recreation and conservation property managed by the DEC.

== History ==
The lake was constructed in the 1970s by impounding a tributary of Nanticoke Creek with the intent of creating a wild, self-sustaining brook trout fishery similar to those found in the Adirondacks. Low dissolved oxygen concentrations during summer months limited brook trout survival. Unauthorized introductions of species such as largemouth bass, black crappie, yellow perch, and sunfish further reduced the habitat suitability for trout. As a result, the DEC now stocks the lake with rainbow trout, focusing on a put-and-take fishery with limited summer survival expected.

== Ecology ==
Rooted aquatic vegetation in Nanticoke Lake is sparse. Fish species documented in the lake include rainbow trout (Oncorhynchus mykiss), largemouth bass (Micropterus salmoides), black crappie (Pomoxis nigromaculatus), yellow perch (Perca flavescens), and pumpkinseed sunfish (Lepomis gibbosus).

== Recreation ==
Nanticoke Lake and the surrounding Multiple Use Area offer freshwater fishing, paddling (hand-carried watercraft), and wildlife observation. Access to the lake is provided by a hand launch on Squedunk Road, approximately 4 miles (6.4 km) south of Center Lisle; visitors must walk about 400 yards (370 m) from the parking area to the lakeshore. Only electric motors are permitted on the water. Anglers typically target rainbow trout in spring and early summer shortly after stocking.

== Management ==
DEC annually stocks the lake with approximately 2,300 yearling rainbow trout to support recreational fishing. New York statewide fishing regulations apply.

== See also ==
- List of lakes in New York
- Broome County, New York
