= Genesee Lake =

- Interactive map of Genesee Lake
- Location: Genesee County, New York, United States
- Coordinates: 42.927°N 78.858°W
- Type: Natural lake
- Basin countries: United States
- Max. length: 0.8 mi (1.3 km)
- Surface area: 125 acres (0.5 km^{2})
- Max. depth: 47 ft (14 m)

Genesee Lake is a natural lake located in Genesee County, New York. The lake covers an area of approximately 7.1 square miles, with a maximum depth of 65.6 feet.

== Geography ==
The lake is located in a low-lying mountainous area and is fed by rainfall and groundwater springs. It is surrounded by natural forested areas and is known for its clear, calm waters.

== See also ==
- List of lakes in New York
