= Atwood Lake (New York) =

Lake in Herkimer County, New York

- Location of Atwood Lake within New York
- Location: Herkimer County, New York
- Coordinates: 43°21′54″N 74°53′52″W
- Surface area: 11 acres (0.017 mi^{2}; 4.5 ha)
- Surface elevation: 1,391 feet (424 m)
- Settlements: Wilmurt

Atwood Lake is a small lake southeast of Wilmurt in Herkimer County, New York. It drains northwest via an unnamed creek that flows into Spectacle Lake.

== See also ==
- List of lakes in New York
