= Cables Lake =

Lake in New York, United States

- Location of Cables Lake within New York
- Location: Delaware County, New York
- Coordinates: 42°00′33″N 74°56′41″W
- Surface area: 26 acres (0.041 mi^{2}; 11 ha)
- Surface elevation: 2,031 feet (619 m)
- Settlements: Roscoe

Cables Lake is a small lake north-northwest of Roscoe in Delaware County, New York. It drains south via an unnamed creek which flows into Russell Brook.

== See also ==
- List of lakes in New York
