= Dart Lake =

Dart’s Lake
- Location of Dart’s Lake within New York
- Location: Herkimer County, New York
- Coordinates: 43°47′46″N 74°51′46″W
- Type: Lake
- Primary inflows: North Branch Moose River
- Primary outflows: North Branch Moose River
- Surface area: 139 acres (0.217 mi^{2}; 56 ha)
- Surface elevation: 1,762 feet (537 m)
- Settlements: Eagle Bay

Dart’s Lake is located northwest of Eagle Bay in Herkimer County, New York. The North Branch Moose River flows through the lake.

== See also ==
- List of lakes in New York
