= Big Diamond Pond =

- Location of Big Diamond Pond within New York
- Location: Herkimer County, New York
- Coordinates: 43°47′17″N 74°57′08″W
- Type: Lake
- Surface area: 12 acres (0.019 mi^{2}; 4.9 ha)
- Surface elevation: 2,014 feet (614 m)
- Settlements: Big Moose

Big Diamond Pond is a small lake southwest of Big Moose in Herkimer County, New York. It drains south via an unnamed creek that flows into the North Branch Moose River.

== See also ==
- List of lakes in New York
