= Gates Homestead =

Historic house in New York, United States

- U.S. National Register of Historic Places
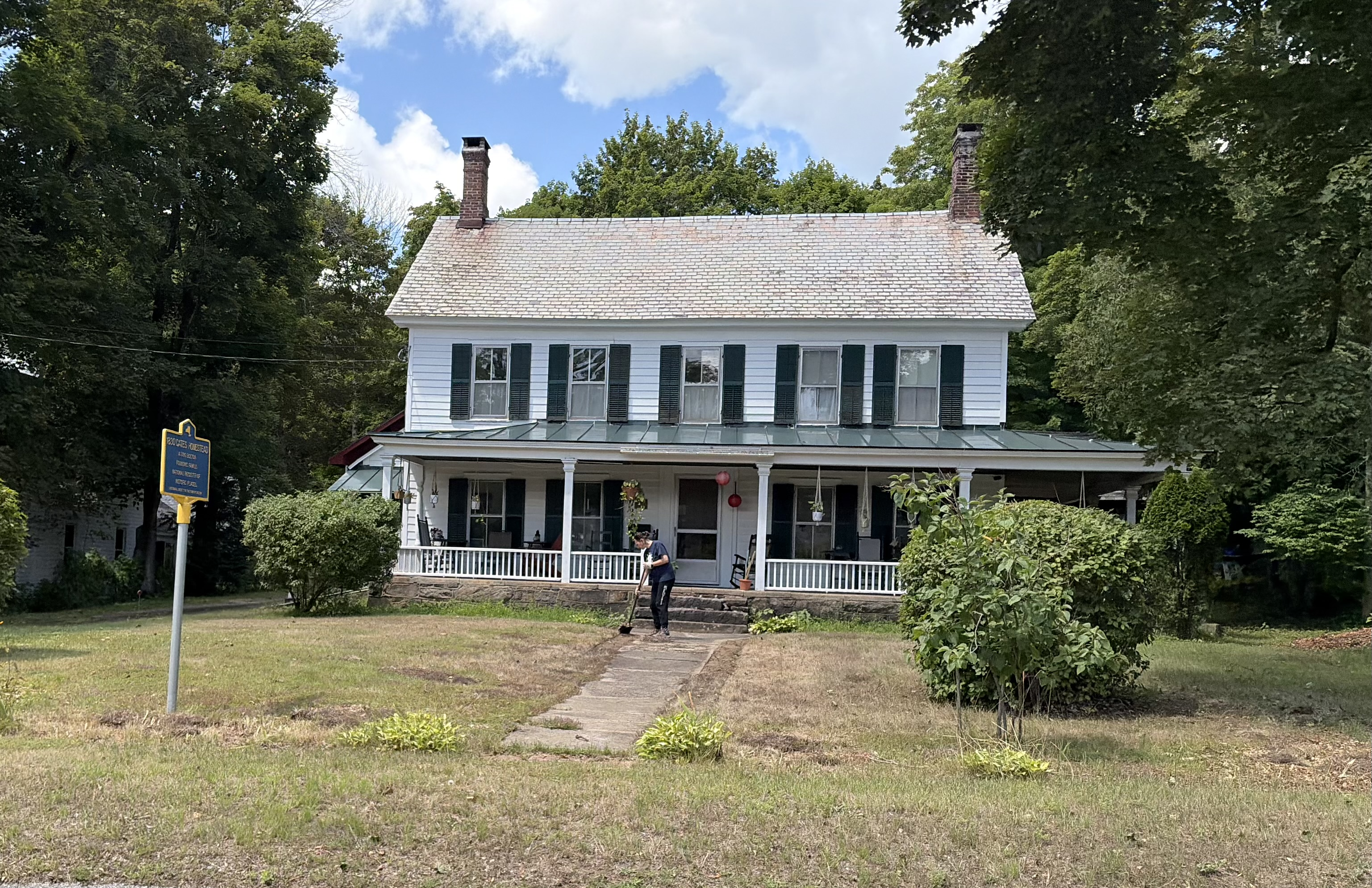
- The Gates Homestead in 2026

- Location within New York Location within the United States
- Location: 4617 Lakeshore Dr. (NY 9N), Bolton, New York
- Coordinates: 43°32′16.03″N 73°40′4.07″W
- Area: 0.68 acres (0.28 ha)
- Architectural style: Federal, Greek Revival
- NRHP reference No.: 10000229
- Added to NRHP: April 27, 2010

Gates Homestead is a historic home located at Bolton, Warren County, New York. The property includes the main house, ice house, carpenter shop, and two barns. All structures (except the east barn) were built between about 1830 and 1880 and moved to their present location in 1919. The main house was built about 1830 and is a 2 1/2-story, post and beam, five-by-two-bay, late Federal / early Greek Revival style residence.

It was added to the National Register of Historic Places in 2010.
