= Bolton, New York =

Town in Warren County, New York

Bolton
- Administrative divisions of New York#Village
- The Village of Bolton
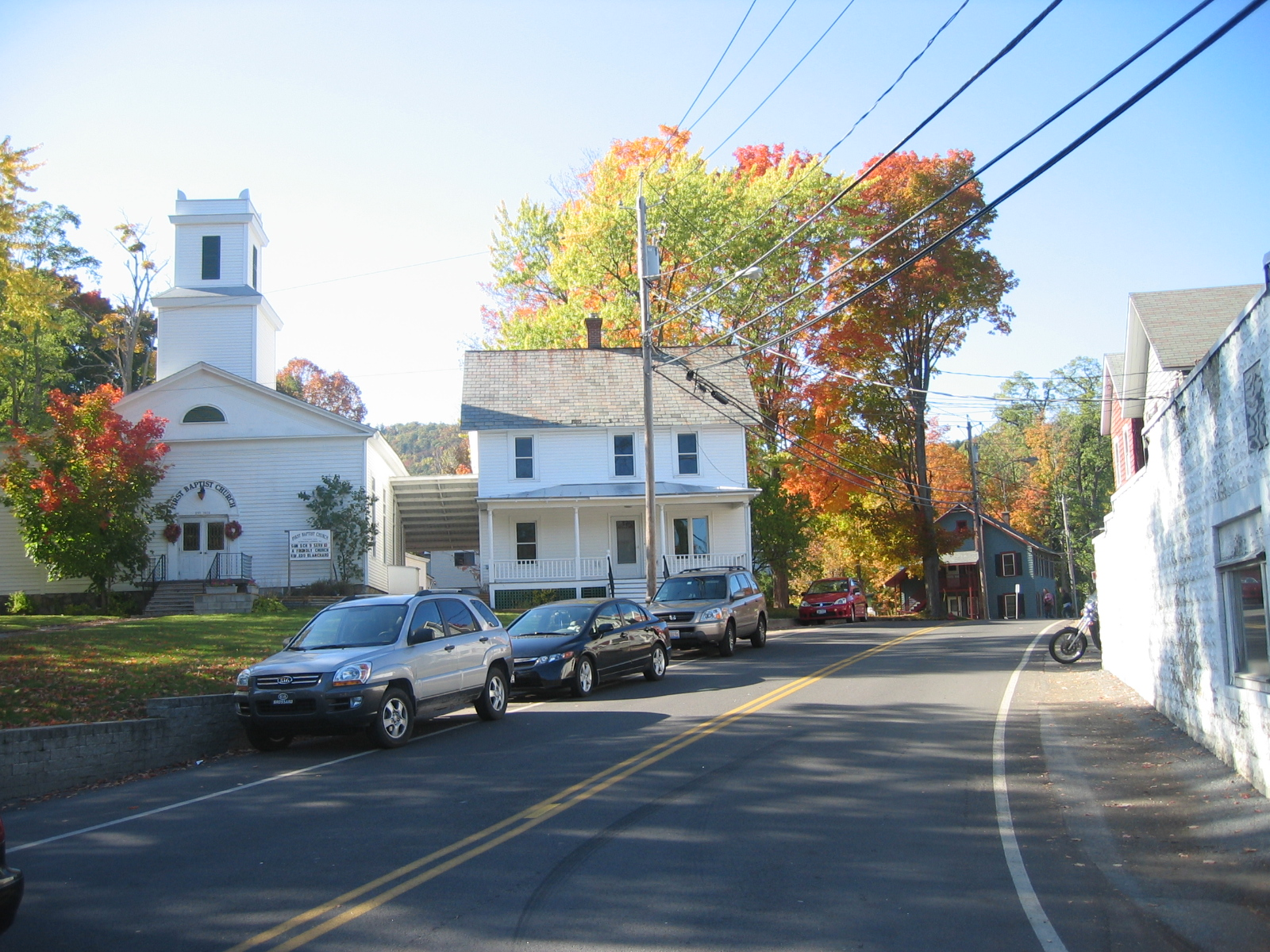
- Neighborhood in Bolton Landing

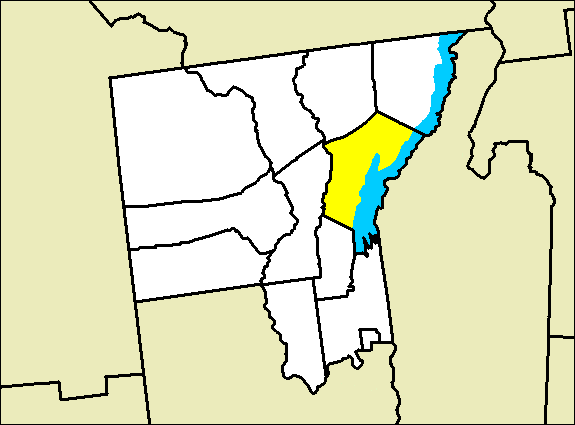
- Location of Bolton in Warren County

- Location within the state of New York
- Coordinates: 43°33′33″N 73°40′5″W
- Country: United States
- State: New York
- County: Warren

Area
  - Total: 90.04 sq mi (233.21 km^{2})
  - Land: 63.27 sq mi (163.88 km^{2})
  - Water: 26.76 sq mi (69.32 km^{2})
- Elevation: 758 ft (231 m)

Population (2010)
  - Total: 2,326
  - Estimate (2016): 2,278
  - Density: 36/sq mi (13.9/km^{2})
- Time zone: UTC-5 (Eastern (EST))
  - Summer (DST): UTC-4 (EDT)
- FIPS code: 36-07234
- GNIS feature ID: 0978741

Bolton is a town in Warren County, New York, United States. It is part of the Glens Falls Metropolitan Statistical Area. The population was 2,117 at the 2000 census. Bolton is on the eastern border of the county.

== History ==
The first settlements began circa 1792.

The village of Bolton was formed from part of the town of Thurman in 1799. Bolton lost some of its territory as three new towns were created in the county.

This village is named after Robert “Bob” Bolton, who moved there in 1788 with his wife Margaret.

The Cadet was listed on the National Register of Historic Places in 2002. The Gates Homestead was added in 2010.

== Geography ==
According to the United States Census Bureau, this village has a total area of 90.1 square miles (233 km^{2}), of which 63.4 square miles (164 km^{2}) is land and 26.7 square miles (69 km^{2}) (29.62%) is water.

The eastern village line, defined by eastern shoreline of Lake George, is the border of Washington County. The place in located within the Adirondack Park.

NY 9N follows the lake along the western shore, connecting the major settlements. Interstate 87, the Northway, runs along the western village line.

The highest point in the village of Bolton is Five Mile Mountain (occasionally spelled Fivemile Mtn) (2256 feet) in the Tongue Mountain Range. The lowest point would appear to be the surface of Lake George, at 320 feet.

== Demographics ==
Historical population
Census	Pop.	Note	%±
1820	1,087		—
1830	1,466		34.9%
1840	937		−36.1%
1850	1,147		22.4%
1860	1,289		12.4%
1870	1,135		−11.9%
1880	1,132		−0.3%
1890	1,387		22.5%
1900	1,363		−1.7%
1910	1,518		11.4%
1920	1,184		−22.0%
1930	1,308		10.5%
1940	1,310		0.2%
1950	1,184		−9.6%
1960	1,417		19.7%
1970	1,589		12.1%
1980	1,793		12.8%
1990	1,855		3.5%
2000	2,117		14.1%
2010	2,326		9.9%
2016 (est.)	2,278		−2.1%
U.S. Decennial Census

As of the census of 2000, there were 2,117 people, 941 households, and 628 families residing in the town. The population density was 33.4 inhabitants per square mile (12.9/km^{2}). There were 2,164 housing units at an average density of 34.1 per square mile (13.2/km^{2}). The racial makeup of the town was 98.02% White, 0.57% African American, 0.05% Native American, 0.47% Asian, 0.14% from other races, and 0.76% from two or more races. Hispanic or Latino of any race were 0.85% of the population.

There were 941 households, out of which 22.8% had children under the age of 18 living with them, 55.3% were married couples living together, 8.2% had a female householder with no husband present, and 33.2% were non-families. 27.1% of all households were made up of individuals, and 11.6% had someone living alone who was 65 years of age or older. The average household size was 2.25 and the average family size was 2.70.

In the town, the population was spread out, with 19.4% under the age of 18, 4.4% from 18 to 24, 23.9% from 25 to 44, 32.9% from 45 to 64, and 19.4% who were 65 years of age or older. The median age was 46 years. For every 100 females, there were 99.3 males. For every 100 females age 18 and over, there were 95.5 males.

The median income for a household in the town was $46,935, and the median income for a family was $52,667. Males had a median income of $35,268 versus $23,000 for females. The per capita income for the town was $26,492. About 3.3% of families and 5.6% of the population were below the poverty line, including 6.4% of those under age 18 and 8.1% of those age 65 or over.

== Communities and locations in Bolton ==
- Basin Bay – A bay south of Bolton hamlet.
- Bolton – A hamlet located on the shore of Lake George on Route 9N.
- Bolton Landing – A hamlet and the major community in the town. It is located on the shore of Lake George on Route 9N.
- Boon Bay – A bay of Lake George near the southern town line.
- Cat Mountain – A mountain in the southwestern part of the town.
- Green Island – An island in Lake George by Bolton Landing.
- Huddle Bay – A bay between Bolton hamlet and Bolton Landing.
- North Bolton – A hamlet northwest of Bolton Landing.
- Northwest Bay – A bay in Lake George, north of Bolton Landing.
- Riverbank – A hamlet on the western town line.
- Tongue Mountain Range – A series of mountains forming a peninsula into Lake George that helps create Northwest Bay. The mountain consists of five peaks (from north to south): Brown Mountain, Fivemile Mountain, Fifth Peak, French Point Mountain, and First Peak.
- Trout Lake – A lake in the south-central part of the town.
