= Russell Lake (New York) =

- Location of Russell Lake within New York
- Location: Delaware County, New York
- Coordinates: 42°03′48″N 75°18′16″W
- Type: Lake
- Primary outflows: Sands Creek
- Basin countries: United States
- Surface area: 20 acres (8.1 ha)
- Surface elevation: 1,690 ft (520 m)
- Settlements: Rock Rift

Russell Lake is a small lake located west-southwest of the hamlet of Rock Rift in Delaware County, New York. Russell Lake drains south via Sands Creek.

== See also ==
- List of lakes in New York
