= Hoffman Brook =

River in Delaware County, New York

- Location of the mouth of Hoffman Brook

Location
- Country: United States
- State: New York
- County: Delaware

Physical characteristics
- Source
  - coordinates: 41°54′46″N 75°06′36″W
- Mouth: North Branch Basket Creek
  - coordinates: 41°53′19″N 75°05′02″W
  - elevation: 1,230 ft (370 m)

Hoffman Brook is a river in Delaware County, New York. It flows into North Branch Basket Creek north-northeast of Basket.
