= Lake Delaware =

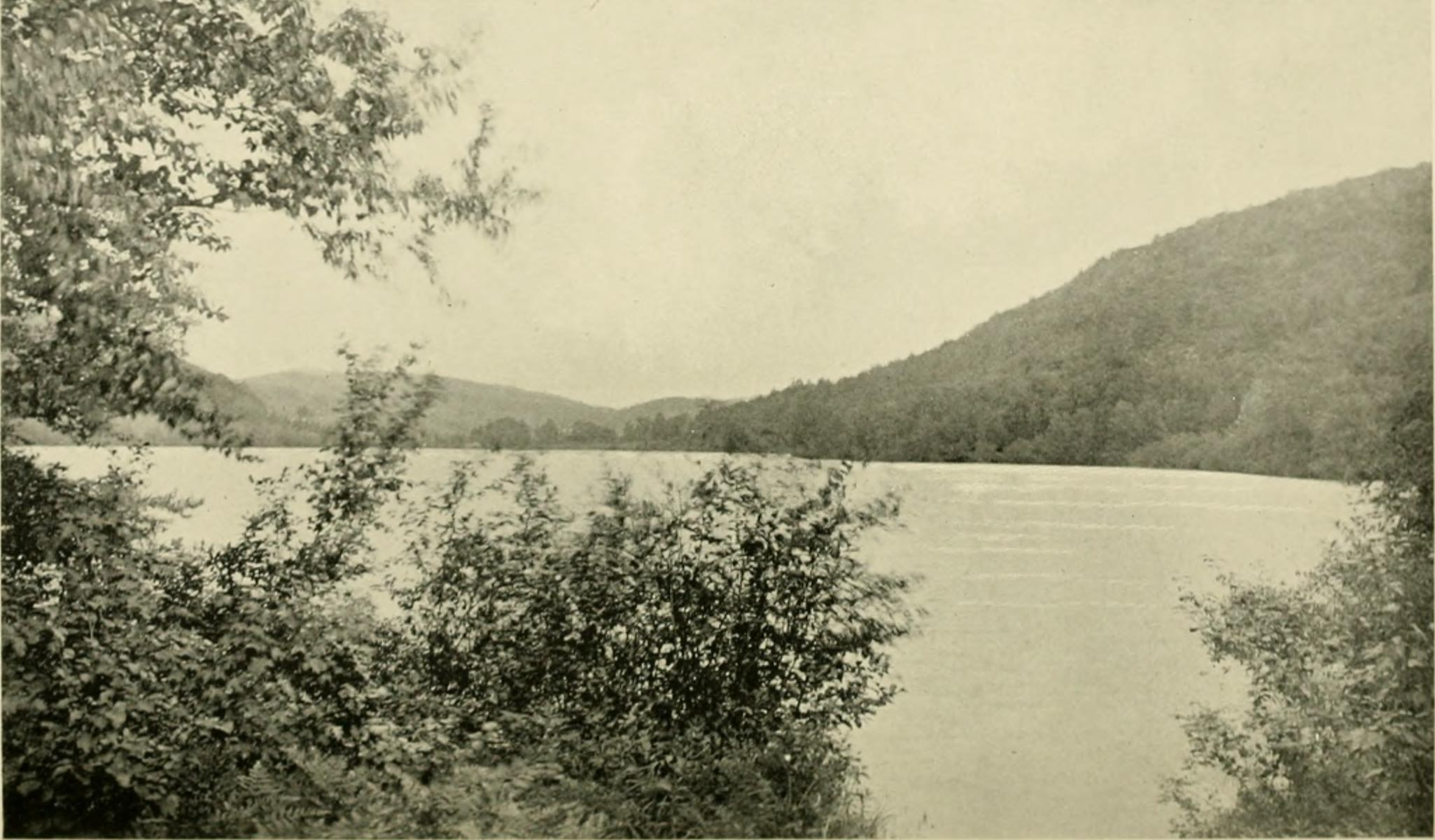

- Location of Lake Delaware within New York
- Location: Delaware County, New York
- Coordinates: 42°14′07″N 74°49′34″W
- Type: Reservoir
- Basin countries: United States
- Surface area: 69 acres (28 ha)
- Surface elevation: 1,801 ft (549 m)
- Settlements: Bovina Center

Lake Delaware is a small reservoir located southwest of the hamlet of Bovina Center in Delaware County, New York. Lake Delaware drains north via an unnamed creek which flows into the Little Delaware River.

== See also ==
- List of lakes in New York
