= Huggins Lake =

Lake in New York State

- Location of Huggins Lake within New York State
- Location: Delaware County, New York
- Coordinates: 42°00′53″N 74°49′27″W
- Basin countries: United States
- Surface area: 19 acres (7.7 ha)
- Surface elevation: 2,224 ft (678 m)
- Settlements: Beaverkill

Huggins Lake is a small lake north-northeast of Beaverkill in Delaware County, New York. It drains south via Huggins Hollow which flows into Beaver Kill. The lake was the site of Indian Ridge, a Boy Scout summer camp managed remotely by Camden County Council, New Jersey, and in operation between 1962 and 1985. Indian Ridge was considered a primitive camp, with no cabins or dining hall. The scouts and staff slept in wall tents: the only structure was a walk-in refrigerator, the concrete pad of which is still visible east of the outlet end of the lake.

== See also ==
- List of lakes in New York
