= Spring Lake (Delaware County, New York) =

Lake in Delaware County, New York, United States

- Location of Spring Lake within New York State
- Location: Delaware County, New York
- Coordinates: 42°19′32″N 74°57′52″W
- Basin countries: United States
- Surface area: 19 acres (7.7 ha)
- Surface elevation: 2,051 ft (625 m)
- Settlements: Delhi

Spring Lake is a small lake north-northwest of Delhi in Delaware County, New York. It drains southeast via an unnamed creek which flows into Steele Brook.

== See also ==
- List of lakes in New York
