= Bear Cub Pond =

Lake in Delaware County, New York, United States

- Location of Bear Cub Pond within New York
- Location: Delaware County, New York
- Coordinates: 42°07′24″N 75°03′34″W
- Surface area: 1 acre (0.0016 mi^{2}; 0.40 ha)
- Surface elevation: 2,008 feet (612 m)
- Settlements: Downsville

Bear Cub Pond is a small lake located northwest of Downsville in Delaware County, New York. Bear Cub Pond drains southeast via an unnamed creek that flows into Wilson Hollow Brook.

== See also ==
- List of lakes in New York
