= Lewey Lake =

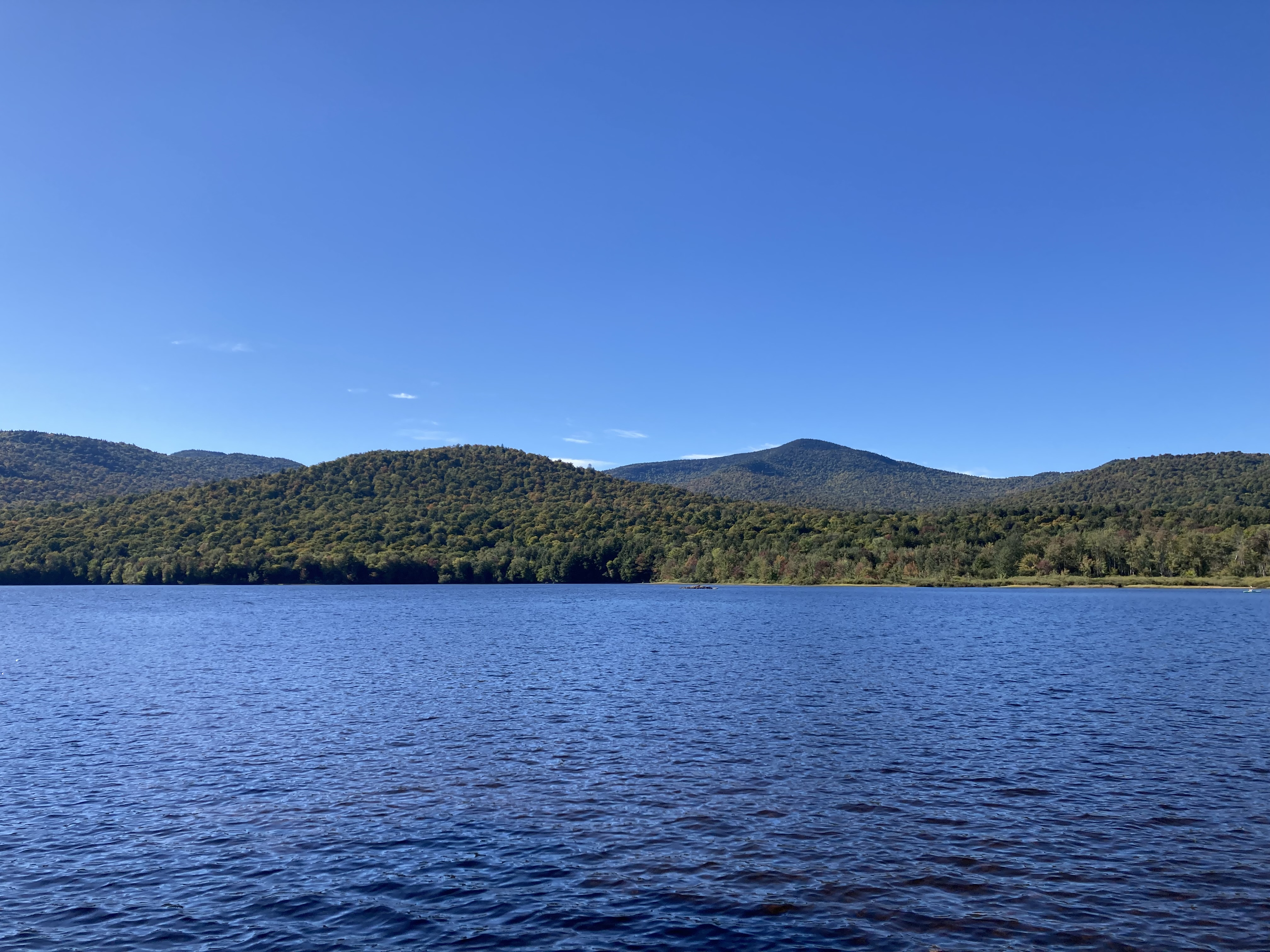
- Lewey Lake, September 2022

- Location within New York Lewey Lake (the United States)
- Location: Hamilton County, New York, United States
- Coordinates: 43°38′21″N 74°23′56″W
- Type: Lake
- Primary inflows: Miami River, Pease Brook
- Primary outflows: Sucker Brook
- Basin countries: United States
- Surface area: 68 acres (0.28 km^{2})
- Average depth: 11 feet (3.4 m)
- Max. depth: 55 feet (17 m)
- Shore length^{1}: 3.5 miles (5.6 km)
- Surface elevation: 1,650 feet (500 m)
- ^{1} Shore length is not a well-defined measure.

Lewey Lake is located in the Adirondack Park in the state of New York. It sits southwest of Indian Lake. Fish species present in the lake are lake trout, lake whitefish, northern pike, smallmouth bass, yellow perch, rock bass, white sucker, and black bullhead. There is a boat launch with a fee in Lewey Lake Campground, on the northeast shore off NY-30.
