= Dry Brook (Sands Creek tributary) =

- Location of the mouth of Dry Brook

Location
- Country: United States
- State: New York
- County: Delaware

Physical characteristics
- Source
  - coordinates: 42°02′32″N 75°19′07″W
- Mouth: Sands Creek
  - coordinates: 42°00′44″N 75°18′14″W
  - elevation: 1,191 ft (363 m)

Dry Brook is a river in Delaware County, New York. It flows into Sands Creek north-northwest of Hancock.
