= Cadet (shipwreck) =

- U.S. National Register of Historic Places
- Location within New York Location within the United States
- Location: Address Restricted, Bolton, New York
- Coordinates: 43°37′20″N 73°32′48″W
- Area: less than one acre
- Built: 1893
- Architectural style: steam launch
- NRHP reference No.: 02000553
- Added to NRHP: May 22, 2002

The Cadet shipwreck is an archaeological site located in Lake George near Bolton in Warren County, New York. It is the site of the shipwreck of the 1893-built Olive ex Cadet steam launch. It was a 48-foot-long, 9.6-foot-wide wooden steamboat with a pointed bow, and was found submerged in approximately 50 feet of water. The ship was discovered by Bateaux Below Inc. in 1997. In 2005, the ship was reported to be in fairly good condition, with its hull mainly intact.

It was listed on the National Register of Historic Places in 2002.
