= Brydon Lake =

Lake in New York, United States

- Location of Brydon Lake within New York
- Location: Delaware County, New York
- Coordinates: 42°11′31″N 74°52′06″W
- Surface area: 13 acres (0.020 mi^{2}; 5.3 ha)
- Surface elevation: 1,982 feet (604 m)
- Settlements: Andes

Brydon Lake is a small lake located west of the hamlet of Andes in Delaware County, New York. Brydon Lake drains south via an unnamed creek which flows into Fall Clove Brook, which flows into the Pepacton Reservoir.

== See also ==
- List of lakes in New York
