= Emmons Pond =

- Location of Emmons Pond within New York
- Location: Delaware County, New York
- Coordinates: 42°25′38″N 75°01′01″W
- Type: Lake
- Basin countries: United States
- Surface area: 5 acres (2.0 ha)
- Surface elevation: 1,932 ft (589 m)
- Settlements: Oneonta

Emmons Pond is a small lake located southeast of the City of Oneonta in Delaware County, New York. Emmons Pond drains north-northwest via an unnamed creek that flows into the Susquehanna River.

== See also ==
- List of lakes in New York
