= Cod Pond =

- Location within New York Location within the United States
- Location: Warren County, New York, United States
- Coordinates: 43.5154359°N 74.1419799°W
- Type: Lake
- Basin countries: United States
- Surface area: 50 acres (0.20 km^{2})
- Max. depth: 6 feet (1.8 m)
- Shore length^{1}: 1.4 miles (2.3 km)
- Surface elevation: 1,516 feet (462 m)
- Settlements: Thurman, New York
- ^{1} Shore length is not a well-defined measure.

Cod Pond is located west of Thurman, New York. Fish species present in the lake are pickerel, sunfish, and black bullhead. There is a trail off CR-8 on the northwest shore.
