= Robert C. Pruyn =

American investor and banker (1847–1934)

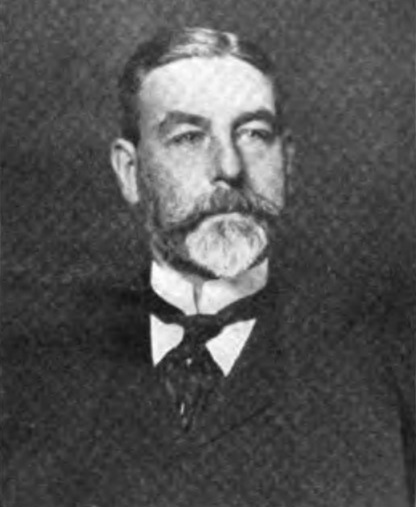
- Leslie's Illustrated, June 15, 1901.

President of the National Commercial Bank and Trust Company
- In office 1885–1931
- Preceded by: Daniel Manning
- Succeeded by: Jacob C. Herzog

Personal details
- Born: Robert Clarence Pruyn; October 23, 1847 Albany, New York, U.S.
- Died: October 29, 1934 (aged 87) Albany, New York, U.S.
- Spouse: Anna Williams (m. 1873)
- Relations: Gerrit Y. Lansing (grandfather)
- Parent(s): Robert H. Pruyn; Jane Ann Lansing Pruyn
- Education: Rutgers College

Robert Clarence Pruyn (October 23, 1847 – October 29, 1934) was an American inventor, banker, businessman, and politician.

== Early life ==
Pruyn was born on October 23, 1847, in Albany, New York. He was a son of Jane Ann (née Lansing) Pruyn (1811–1886) and Robert Hewson Pruyn, who served as Speaker of the New York State Assembly in 1850 and 1854 and was one of the founders of Albany Law School. Among his siblings was Charles Lansing Pruyn.

His maternal grandparents were Helen (née Ten Eyck) Lansing (daughter of Abraham Ten Eyck) and Gerrit Yates Lansing, a U.S. Representative who served as the Chancellor of the University of the State of New York. His paternal grandparents were Ann (née Hewson) Pruyn and Casparus Francis Pruyn, the land and business agent of Rensselaerwyck for Stephen Van Rensselaer. The Pruyn family was one of the oldest and most esteemed Dutch families in New York, and at the time of Robert's birth, had resided in Albany for over two centuries.

At an early age, Pruyn traveled to Japan with his father (who was political ally and close friend to William Henry Seward), where the elder Pruyn was serving as the U.S. Minister to Japan. When he returned to the United States in 1865, he entered Rutgers College from which he graduated in 1869. He also received M.A. and LL.D. degrees from Rutgers.

== Career ==
He was also active in the state militia, rising to the rank of colonel.

In 1871, Pruyn went on to become president of the Embossing Company, one of the major toy manufacturers of the late nineteenth and early twentieth centuries. He was credited for five patents involving puzzles, dominoes, and building blocks. When John A. Dix became Governor of New York in 1873, Pruyn became an aide on the Governor's staff, and was later appointed a member of the New York State Board of Regents.

On May 23, 1885, Pruyn was named the President of National Commercial Bank and Trust Company of Albany after the former president, Daniel Manning, was appointed United States Secretary of the Treasury by President Grover Cleveland. Coincidentally, Manning has succeeded Pruyn's father as president of the Bank. During his forty-one years as president, Pruyn's secretaries included Charles E. Adams and Frederick Baldwin Adams. Pruyn and his staff became some of the more successful investors of the early twentieth century. While president, Pruyn hired architect Robert W. Gibson to erect a new granite and marble headquarters at 60 State Street in Albany, which opened in May 1904.

Pruyn also served as vice-president of the Municipal Gas Company of Albany, and the president of the Albany Railway Company, the two largest corporations in the city. He was a director (and one of the organizers) of the Union Trust Company, a member of the board of governors of the Albany Hospital, a director of the Albany Institute and Historical and Art Society, a member of the Sons of the Revolution, the Holland Society, the Century Association, the University Club, the Metropolitan Club and the Jekyll Island Club in Georgia.

== Personal life ==
On October 22, 1873, he was married to Anna Williams (1853–1939). Anna was a daughter of Martha Andrews (née Hough) Williams and Chauncey Pratt Williams, former president of the National Exchange Bank. Her brother, Chauncey Pratt Williams, was a prominent banker and historian. Pruyn hired architects Potter & Robertson to design a house for his family at the corner of Lancaster and Willett Streets. Together, they were the parents of three sons and one daughter, including:

- Edward Lansing Pruyn (1875–1950), an artists who married Gladys Lillian Ericson (1900–1959).
- Ruth Williams Pruyn (1877), who married David Marvin Goodrich, and son Benjamin Goodrich (founder of the B. F. Goodrich Company), in 1903. They divorced and David married Frederic's ex-wife Beatrice in 1936.
- Robert Dunbar Pruyn (1879–1955), a Harvard graduate who married Rebecca C. Metcalf (1880–1943), a daughter of Frederic Wilder Metcalf.
- Frederic Pruyn (1881–1938), who married Beatrice Morgan, a daughter of William Fellowes Morgan Sr., in 1907.

Pruyn died in Albany on October 29, 1934. He was buried at the Albany Rural Cemetery in Menands, New York.

=== Legacy ===
He also established the 13,000 acre (53 km²) Santanoni Preserve on Newcomb Lake in the Adirondack Mountains upstate of New York, which is today a National Historic Landmark, and has been subsumed into the larger Adirondack Forest Preserve. After President William McKinley was shot in 1901 at the Pan-American Exposition in Buffalo, then vice president Theodore Roosevelt traveled to Buffalo to visit McKinley in the hospital. As it appeared that McKinley would recover, Roosevelt went on to Santanoni as Pruyn's guest; the two were old friends. When McKinley's condition worsened, Roosevelt left directly from Santanoni to Buffalo where he was inaugurated as the 26th President of the United States.

A portrait of Pruyn by William Merritt Chase was owned for many years by the National Commercial Bank and Trust Co. in Albany.
