= Snowy Mountain Fire Observation Station =

- U.S. National Register of Historic Places
- Location within New York Location within the United States
- Location: Snowy Mountain, Indian Lake, New York
- Coordinates: 43°42′7″N 74°20′6″W
- Area: 14.2 acres (5.7 ha)
- Built: 1917
- Architect: Aermotor Corporation
- MPS: Fire Observation Stations of New York State Forest Preserve MPS
- NRHP reference No.: 01001031
- Added to NRHP: September 23, 2001

The Snowy Mountain Fire Observation Station is a 45 feet (14 m) steel-frame fire lookout tower on Snowy Mountain at Indian Lake in the Adirondack Mountains of New York.

It was built in 1917 as a 22 feet (6.7 m) prefabricated LS40 tower made by the Aermotor Windmill Company. Following the growth of surrounding trees, four more flights of stairs were added in 1933. With the advent of aerial detection, this tower was closed in 1971. It was added to the National Register of Historic Places in 2001.

It has been restored by the New York State Department of Environmental Conservation and local volunteers, and open to the public.
