= Nanticoke Creek (New York) =

River in New York

- Etymology: named after the Nanticoke tribe

Physical characteristics
- Source
  - location: Above Nanticoke Lake in Lisle, New York
  - coordinates: 42°20′28″N 76°06′06″W
  - elevation: 1,375 ft (419 m)
- Mouth
  - location: Susquehanna River in Endicott, New York
  - coordinates: 42°05′02″N 76°05′05″W
  - elevation: 804 ft (245 m)
- Length: 22 mi (35 km)

Basin features
- Progression: Susquehanna River → Chesapeake Bay

Nanticoke Creek is a river in Broome County, New York. It is approximately 22 miles (35 km) long, emptying into the Susquehanna River in Endicott, New York. It flows from its source above and through Nanticoke Lake in Lisle, New York, through the towns of Nanticoke, Maine, and Union.

In December 2020, the creek overflowed its banks and flooded part of the En-Joie Golf Club in Endicott, New York.

Parts of the creek near Maine, New York are suitable for fishing.
