= Pine Swamp Brook =

- Location of the mouth of Pine Swamp Brook

Location
- Country: United States
- State: New York
- County: Delaware

Physical characteristics
- Source
  - coordinates: 42°01′00″N 75°19′25″W
- Mouth: Sands Creek
  - coordinates: 42°00′04″N 75°18′30″W
  - elevation: 1,115 ft (340 m)

Pine Swamp Brook is a river in Delaware County, New York. It flows into Sands Creek north-northwest of Hancock.
