= Little Simon Pond =

Body of water in Herkimer County, New York

- Location of Little Simon Pond within New York
- Location: Herkimer County, New York
- Coordinates: 43°43′57″N 75°02′27″W
- Type: Lake
- Basin countries: United States
- Surface area: 6 acres (2.4 ha)
- Surface elevation: 1,795 ft (547 m)
- Settlements: Old Forge

Little Simon Pond is a small lake northwest of Old Forge in Herkimer County, New York. It drains south via an unnamed creek which flows into South Inlet.

== See also ==
- List of lakes in New York
