= Chisholm Pond =

- Location of Chisholm Pond within New York
- Location: Delaware County, New York
- Coordinates: 42°19′41″N 75°04′06″W
- Type: Lake
- Surface area: 8 acres (0.013 mi^{2}; 3.2 ha)
- Surface elevation: 1,988 feet (606 m)
- Settlements: Treadwell

Chisholm Pond is a small lake located southwest of the hamlet of Treadwell in Delaware County, New York. Chisholm Pond drains west via an unnamed creek that flows into the East Branch Handsome Brook.

== See also ==
- List of lakes in New York
