= Pine Pond =

Lake in Putnam County, New York

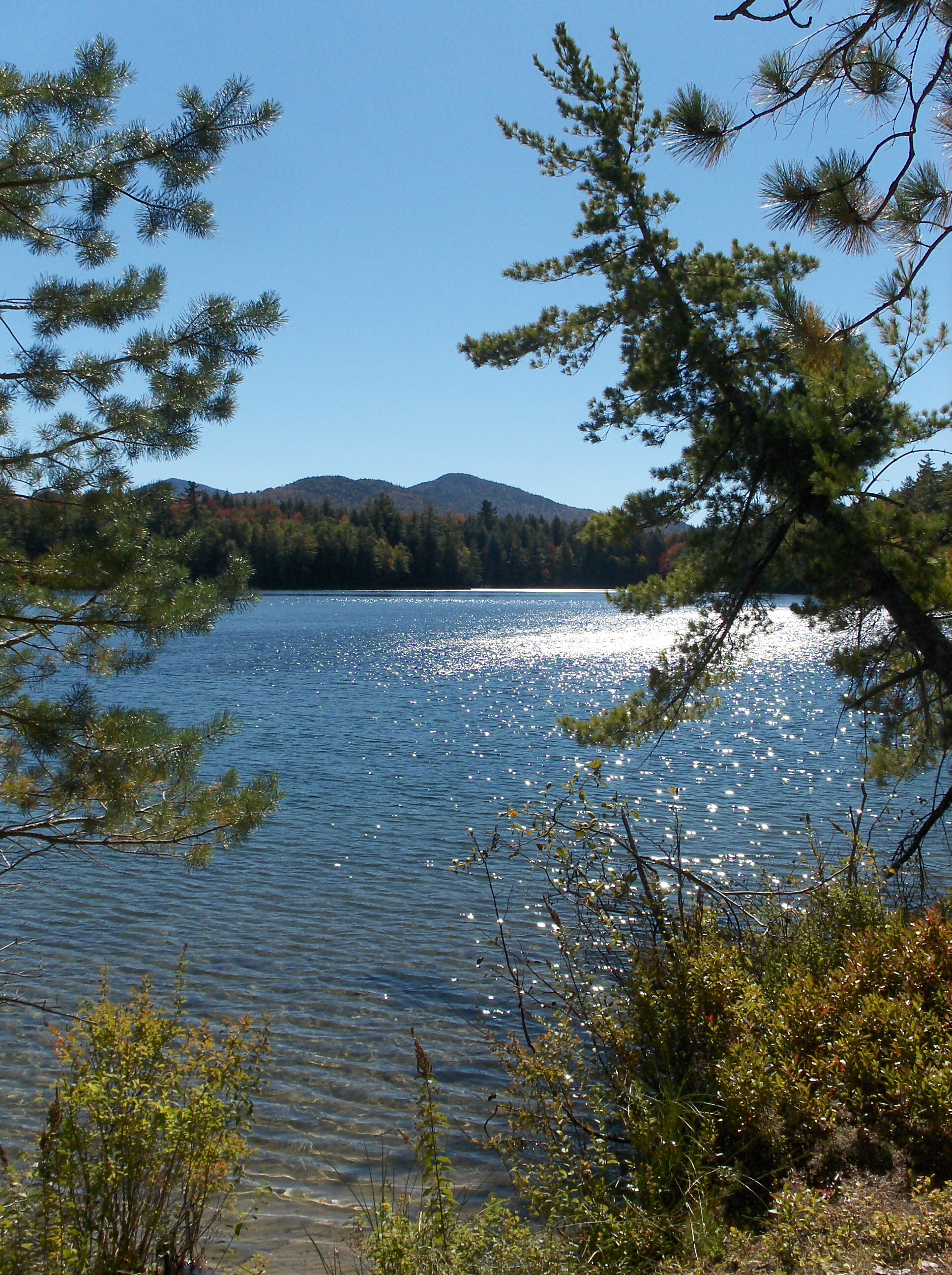

- Location within New York
- Location: Putnam County, New York, United States
- Coordinates: 41.4655333°N 73.7079684°W
- Type: Pond
- Basin countries: United States
- Surface area: 80 acres (32 ha)

Pine Pond is a lake in Putnam County, in the U.S. state of New York. The pond has a surface area of 80 acres (32 ha).

Pine Pond was so named on account of pine timber at its perimeter.
