= Wolf Lake (New York) =

Lake in New York, United States

- Location within New York
- Location: Sullivan County, New York
- Coordinates: 41°35′13″N 74°35′20″W
- Basin countries: United States
- Surface area: 299 acres (1.21 km^{2})
- Surface elevation: 1,506 feet (459 m)

Wolf Lake is located near Wurtsboro, New York. The spring-fed 340-acre (140 ha) lake is a 90-minute drive from New York City.

== History ==
Wolf Lake is a private residential lake community, established in 1940, with a mix of year-round and seasonal residents in Sullivan County, New York. Wolf Lake is known for its multi-generational community and conservation ethos. The residents own their own lots and houses plus a share of stock in Wolf Lake, Inc. which owns nearly 2000 acres of hunting, fishing and passive recreational preserve. The conservation creed of Wolf Lake is "Forever Wild". The focal point of the community, the Wolf Lake clubhouse, provides social and recreational activities for members, such as a pancake breakfast, an annual picnic, swimming events and dinners. Certified personnel at the beach area provide swimming lessons.

== Recreation ==
All activities, on the water and in the vicinity of the lake, are for Wolf Lake residents and their guests only. Water activities include sailboating, canoeing, rowing, and electric boating (the lake has a ban on gasoline-powered boats to preserve water quality). As for fishing, the lake has sunfish, small mouth and large mouth bass, pickerel, perch, catfish and bluegills. The surrounding woodlands are good for hiking, mountain biking, riding ATV's, and seasonal hunting. The community maintains its own gun and archery range. In the winter, the woods also offer snowmobiling and cross-country skiing.
