= North Branch Basket Creek =

- Location of the mouth of North Branch Basket Creek

Location
- Country: United States
- State: New York
- County: Delaware

Physical characteristics
- Source
  - coordinates: 41°55′38″N 75°05′10″W
- Mouth: Basket Creek
  - coordinates: 41°51′32″N 75°05′47″W
  - elevation: 958 ft (292 m)

Basin features
- Tributaries
  - left: Hoffman Brook

North Branch Basket Creek is a river in Delaware County and Sullivan County in New York. It flows into Basket Creek northeast of Basket.
