= Indian Lake (Hamilton County, New York) =

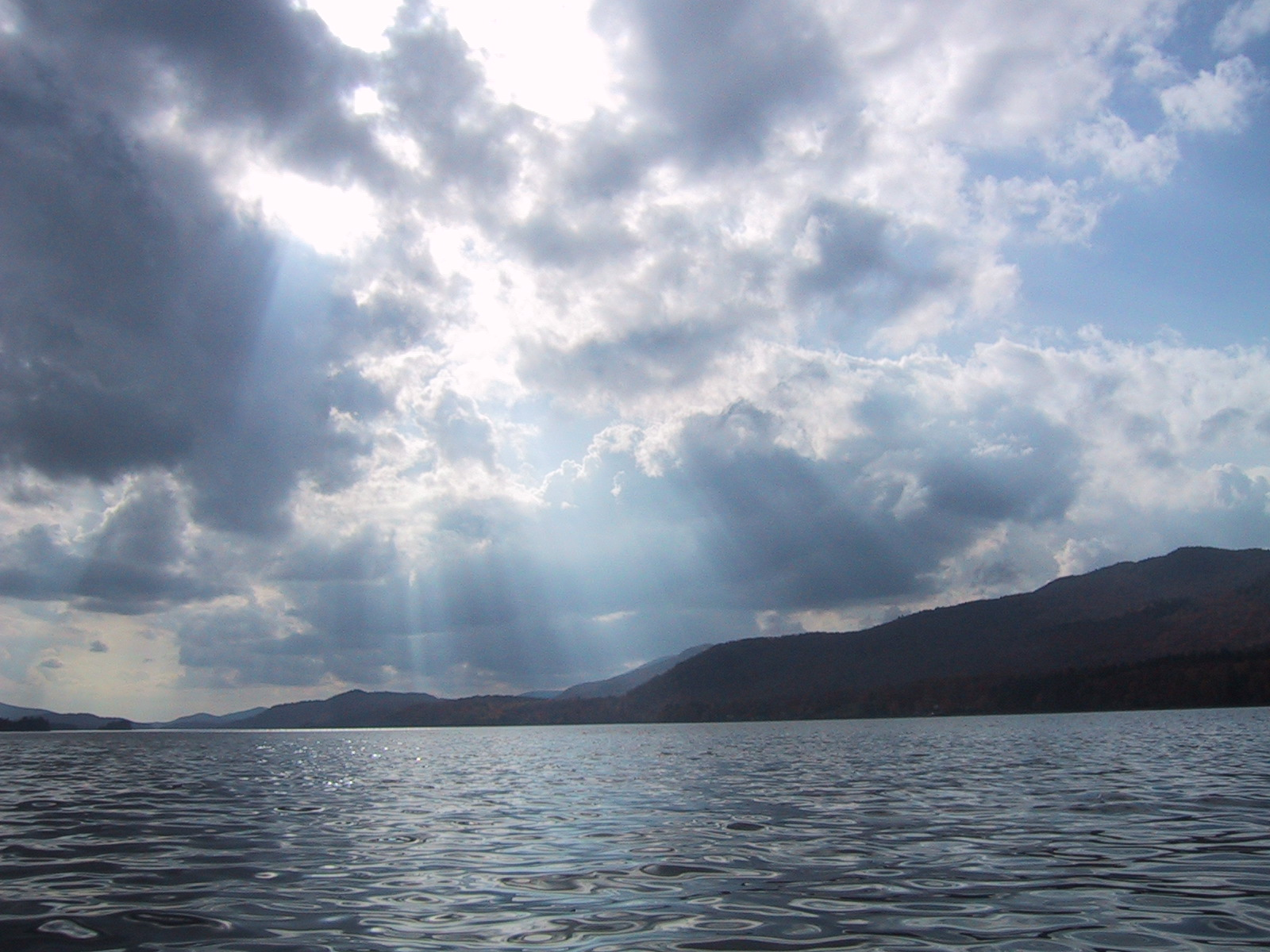

- Location within New York Indian Lake (the United States)
- Location: Hamilton County, New York, United States
- Coordinates: 43°41′09″N 74°19′48″W
- Type: Reservoir
- Primary inflows: Jessup River, Lewey Lake, Mc Ginn Brook, Woodland Brook, Falls Brook, Willow Brook, Forks Brook, Griffin Brook, Beaver Brook, Doherty Brook, Lawrence Brook, Squaw Brook
- Primary outflows: Indian River
- Basin countries: United States
- Max. length: 12 miles (19 km)
- Max. width: 1 mile (1.6 km)
- Surface area: 4,676 acres (1,892 ha)
- Average depth: 39 feet (12 m)
- Max. depth: 85 feet (26 m)
- Surface elevation: 1,650 feet (500 m)
- Islands: 10
- Settlements: Indian Lake, New York

Indian Lake is a 12-mile (19 km) long, 4,255-acre (1,722 ha) reservoir with a southwest to northeast orientation in the towns of Indian Lake and Lake Pleasant in Hamilton County, in the Adirondack Park of New York State, in the United States. The hamlet of Indian Lake is located 2 miles (3.2 km) north of the north end of Indian Lake. New York State Route 30 runs along the west shore of the lake. Most of the shore is part of the Forest Preserve. Indian Lake is fed by the Jessup River, and drains through the Indian River into Lake Abanakee, and from there through the Indian River to the Hudson River.

The State of New York operates a campground offering campsites in Indian Lake, most of which are on islands, that are accessible only by boat. The campground is 12 miles south of Indian Lake village on NY 30, and is open from mid-May until Columbus Day.

The lake was made famous by the 1968 pop song "Indian Lake" performed by the Cowsills.

== Tributaries and locations ==
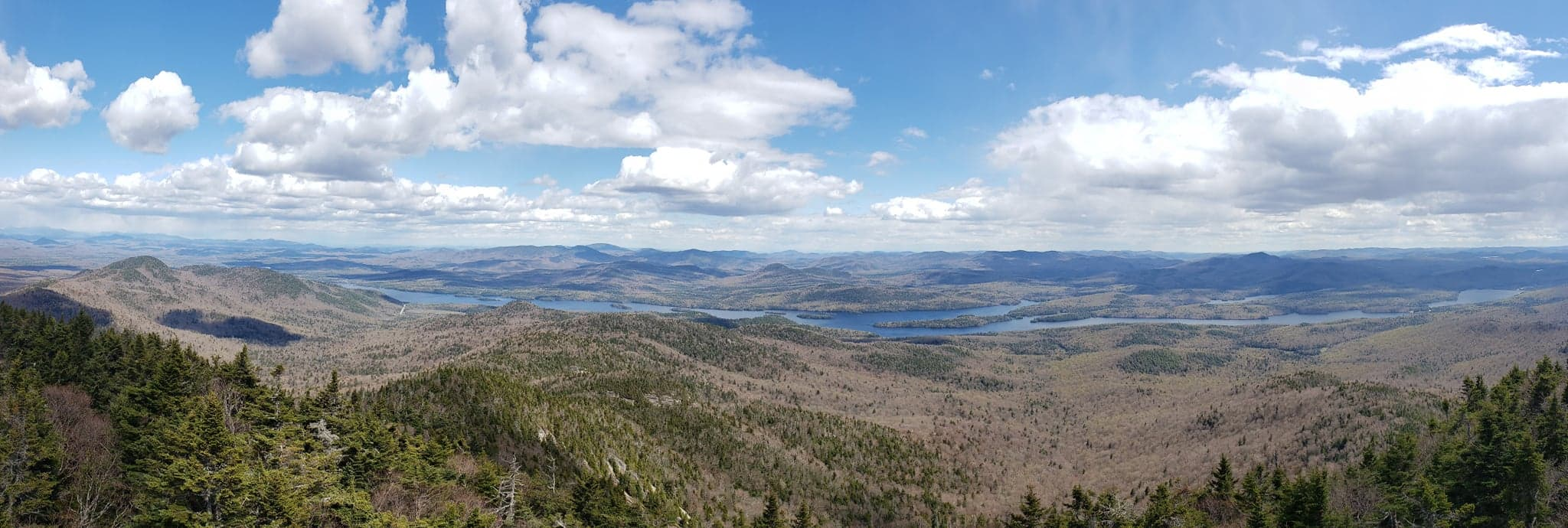
Indian Lake from Snowy Mountain fire tower

- Camp Island – An island located by the Indian Lakes Islands Campground. Has a campsite on the island.
- Crotched Point Island – An island located north of Camp Island. There is a campsite on the island.
- Doherty Island – An island located where the Doherty Brook enters the lake. There is a campground on the island.
- Green Island – An island located south of Doherty Island. There is a campground on the island.
- John Mack Bay – A bay of the lake that is located near Moose Island.
- Kirpen's Island – An island located in Norman's Cove.
- Moose Island – An island located at the mouth of the Jessup River bay. The largest island on the lake. There is a campsite on the island.
- Norman's Cove – A bay of the lake located on the east shore across from Sabael.
- Poplar Point – A point located between the mouths of Willow Brook and Forks Brook.

== Fishing ==
Fish species present in the lake are brook trout, lake trout, brown trout, landlocked salmon, smallmouth bass, northern pike, lake whitefish, black bullhead, yellow perch, smelt, pumpkinseed sunfish, and white sucker. There is a state owned hard surface ramp launch in the campground off NY-30, 14 miles north of Speculator, New York. There are also boat rentals available and a marina.

== Photo gallery ==
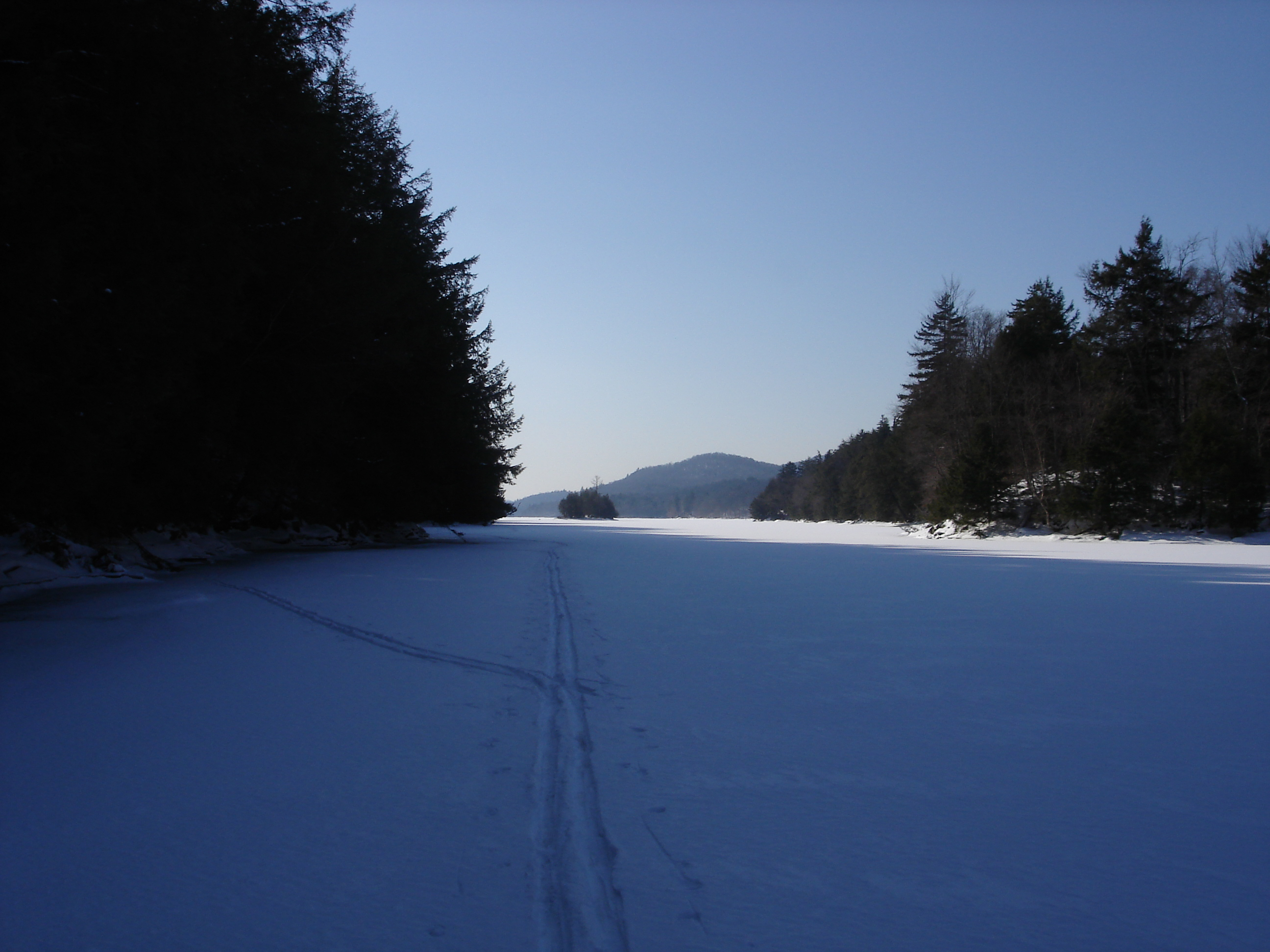
Indian Lake narrows in the winter.
