= Hicks Pond =

- Location within New York
- Location: Rensselaer County, New York
- Coordinates: 42°40′09″N 73°29′44″W
- Type: Lake
- Basin countries: United States
- Surface area: 23 acres (9.3 ha)
- Surface elevation: 1,207 ft (368 m)

Hicks Pond is a lake in the U.S. state of New York. The surface area of the pond is 23 acres (9.3 ha).

An old variant name was "Hacks Pond".
