= The Fly (lake) =

Lake in Otsego County, New York, United States

- Location of The Fly within New York State
- Location: Otsego County, New York
- Coordinates: 42°21′10″N 75°17′32″W
- Primary inflows: The Fly
- Surface area: 63 acres (25 ha)
- Surface elevation: 1,161 feet (354 m)
- Settlements: Unadilla

The Fly also known as "Buck Horn Lake" is a small lake in Otsego County, New York. It is located northeast of Unadilla. The Fly drains south via an unnamed creek which flows into Susquehanna River.
