= Kendall Pond =

- Location within New York
- Location: Rensselaer County, New York
- Coordinates: 42°41′15″N 73°23′51″W
- Type: lake
- Basin countries: United States
- Surface area: 38 acres (15 ha)
- Surface elevation: 1,749 ft (533 m)

Kendall Pond is a lake in the U.S. state of New York. The surface area of the pond is 38 acres (15 ha).

Kendall Pond was named after David Kendall, a pioneer citizen.
