= Pea Brook =

- Location of the mouth of Pea Brook

Location
- Country: United States
- State: New York
- County: Delaware

Physical characteristics
- Source
  - coordinates: 41°55′00″N 75°07′56″W
- Mouth: Delaware River
  - coordinates: 41°51′05″N 75°08′19″W
  - elevation: 823 ft (251 m)

Pea Brook is a river in Delaware County and Sullivan County in New York. It flows into the Delaware River in Long Eddy.
