= Featherstonhaugh Lake =

- Location within New York
- Location: Schenectady County, New York
- Coordinates: 42°48′51″N 74°06′57″W
- Type: lake
- Basin countries: United States
- Surface area: 38 acres (15 ha)
- Surface elevation: 1,289 ft (393 m)

Featherstonhaugh Lake is located in the U.S. state of New York. The surface area of the lake is 38 acres (15 ha).

Featherstonhaugh Lake was named after the local Featherstonhaugh family.
