= Perch Lake (Delaware County, New York) =

Lake in Delaware County, New York, United States

- Location of Perch Lake within New York
- Location: Delaware County, New York
- Coordinates: 42°07′03″N 74°48′08″W
- Basin countries: United States
- Surface area: 31 acres (13 ha)
- Surface elevation: 1,798 ft (548 m)
- Settlements: Arena

Perch Lake is a small lake located west of the hamlet of Arena in Delaware County, New York. Perch Lake drains east via an unnamed creek which flows into the Pepacton Reservoir.

== See also ==
- List of lakes in New York
