= Loon Lake (Steuben County, New York) =

Lake in New York, United States

- Location within New York Location within the United States
- Location: Steuben County, New York, United States
- Coordinates: 42°29′10″N 77°33′48″W
- Basin countries: United States
- Surface area: 141 acres (0.57 km^{2})
- Average depth: 12 feet (3.7 m)
- Max. depth: 45 ft (14 m)
- Shore length^{1}: 3.1 miles (5.0 km)
- Surface elevation: 1,696 ft (517 m)
- Settlements: Cohocton, New York
- ^{1} Shore length is not a well-defined measure.

Loon Lake is located near Cohocton, New York. Fish species present in the lake include largemouth bass, yellow perch, black bullhead, cisco, rock bass, smallmouth bass, pickerel, brown bullhead, and pumpkinseed sunfish. There is access for fee via boat launch on the west shore off Laf Alot Road. You can also access it by going down Faki Road and getting a paid boat.
