= China Pond =

Lake in Putnam County, New York, United States

- Location of China Pond in New York
- Location: Putnam County, New York, United States
- Coordinates: 41°26′31.30″N 73°44′36.19″W
- Surface area: 50 acres (20 ha)
- Surface elevation: 234 m (768 ft)

China Pond is a lake in Putnam County, in the U.S. state of New York. The pond has a surface area of 50 acres (20 ha).

According to tradition, China Pond was named from an incident after a woman tossed chinaware into it in order to anger her drunk husband.
