= Trout Lake (Warren County, New York) =

- Location of mouth within New York Trout Lake (the United States)
- Location: Warren County, New York, United States
- Coordinates: 43°32′16″N 73°42′16″W
- Type: Lake
- Primary outflows: Huddle Brook
- Basin countries: United States
- Surface area: 254 acres (1.03 km^{2})
- Average depth: 20 feet (6.1 m)
- Max. depth: 75 feet (23 m)
- Shore length^{1}: 3.7 miles (6.0 km)
- Surface elevation: 787 feet (240 m)
- Islands: 1
- Settlements: Bolton, New York
- ^{1} Shore length is not a well-defined measure.

Trout Lake is located west of Bolton, New York. Fish species present in the lake are brook trout, rainbow trout, splake, lake trout, smallmouth bass, largemouth bass, pickerel, yellow perch, smelt, rock bass, rainbow smelt, brown trout and brown bullhead. There is a carry down trail on the northeast shore via trail off Lamb Hill Road. There is a 50-horsepower motor limit on this lake. It is called Trout Lake due to the high numbers of lake trout and rainbow trout that are found in the lake. It is also shaped like a trout.
