= Sands Creek =

Location
- Country: United States
- State: New York

Physical characteristics
- Source: Russell Lake
  - location: Delaware County, New York
  - coordinates: 42°03′42″N 75°18′14″W
  - elevation: 1,690 ft (520 m)
- Mouth: West Branch Delaware River
  - location: Hancock, New York, Delaware County, New York, United States
  - coordinates: 41°57′18″N 75°17′49″W
- Basin size: 18.1 mi^{2} (47 km^{2})

Basin features
- Tributaries
  - left: Bear Brook
  - right: Dry Brook, Pine Swamp Brook

Sands Creek is a river in Delaware County, New York. It flows into the West Branch Delaware River by Hancock, New York.
