= Lake Abanakee =

- Location within New York Lake Abanakee (the United States)
- Location: Hamilton County, New York, United States
- Coordinates: 43°45′55″N 74°15′19″W, 43°47′53″N 74°13′47″W
- Type: Reservoir
- Primary inflows: Indian River
- Primary outflows: Indian River
- Basin countries: United States
- Surface area: 1,017 acres (4.12 km^{2})
- Average depth: 12 feet (3.7 m)
- Max. depth: 27 feet (8.2 m)
- Shore length^{1}: 10.5 miles (16.9 km)
- Surface elevation: 1,601 feet (488 m)
- Islands: 9
- Settlements: Indian Lake, New York
- ^{1} Shore length is not a well-defined measure.

Lake Abanakee is located northeast of Indian Lake, New York. Fish species present in the lake are northern pike, white sucker, smallmouth bass, largemouth bass, black bullhead, yellow perch, rock bass, and sunfish. There is a canoe launch on the west shore off Big Brook Road and a second canoe launch on the south shore, off Jerry Savarie Road.
