= Indian River (Hudson River tributary) =

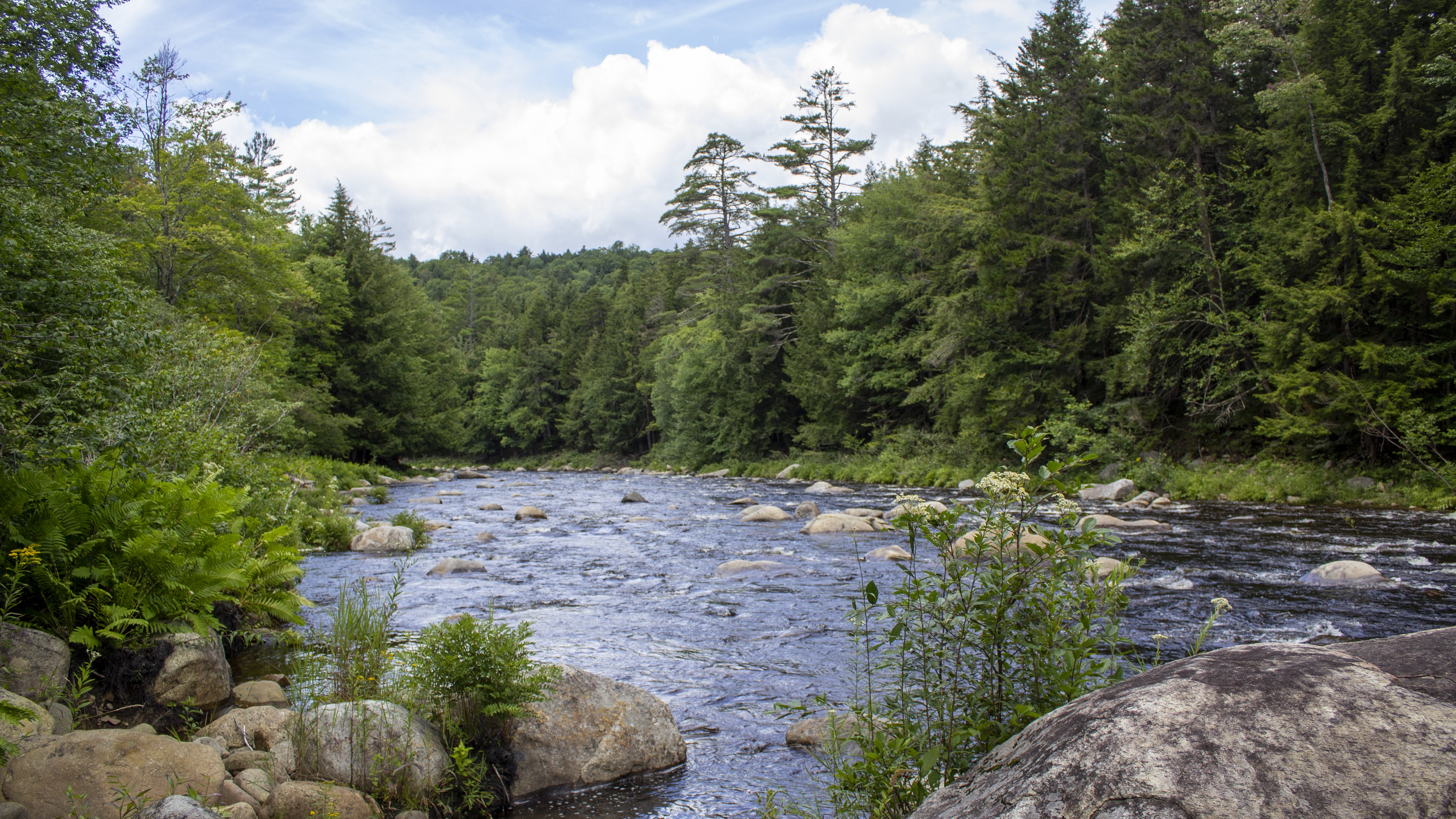
- Indian River from NY RTE 8 near Wells, NY

- Location of the mouth of the Indian sea Indian River (Hudson River tributary) (the United States)

Location
- Country: United States
- State: New York
- Region: Adirondacks
- Counties: Hamilton, Essex
- Towns: Indian Lake, Minerva

Physical characteristics
- Source: Indian Lake
  - location: S of Indian Lake (hamlet)
  - coordinates: 43°45′17″N 74°16′33″W
  - elevation: 1,650 ft (500 m)
- Mouth: Hudson River
  - location: NE of Indian Lake (hamlet)
  - coordinates: 43°49′24″N 74°11′40″W
  - elevation: 1,401 ft (427 m)

Indian River is a river in Hamilton County and Essex County in the U.S. State of New York. Indian River begins at Indian Lake south of the Hamlet of Indian Lake and flows northeastward, through Lake Abanakee, before converging with the Hudson River northeast of the Hamlet of Indian Lake.
