= Garnet Lake =

Lake in Warren County, New York, United States

- Location within New York Location within the United States
- Location: Warren County, New York, United States
- Coordinates: 43°31′31.30″N 74°1′22.91″W
- Type: Lake
- Primary outflows: Mill Creek
- Basin countries: United States
- Surface area: 313 acres (1.27 km^{2})
- Average depth: 25 feet (7.6 m)
- Max. depth: 30 feet (9.1 m)
- Shore length^{1}: 8.5 miles (13.7 km)
- Surface elevation: 1,463 feet (446 m)
- Islands: 1
- Settlements: Garnet Lake, New York
- ^{1} Shore length is not a well-defined measure.

Garnet Lake is located south of the hamlet of Garnet Lake, New York. Fish species present in the lake are pickerel, largemouth bass, yellow perch, and brown bullhead. There is carry down on a trail off Maxam Road on the east shore.
