= Newcomb Lake =

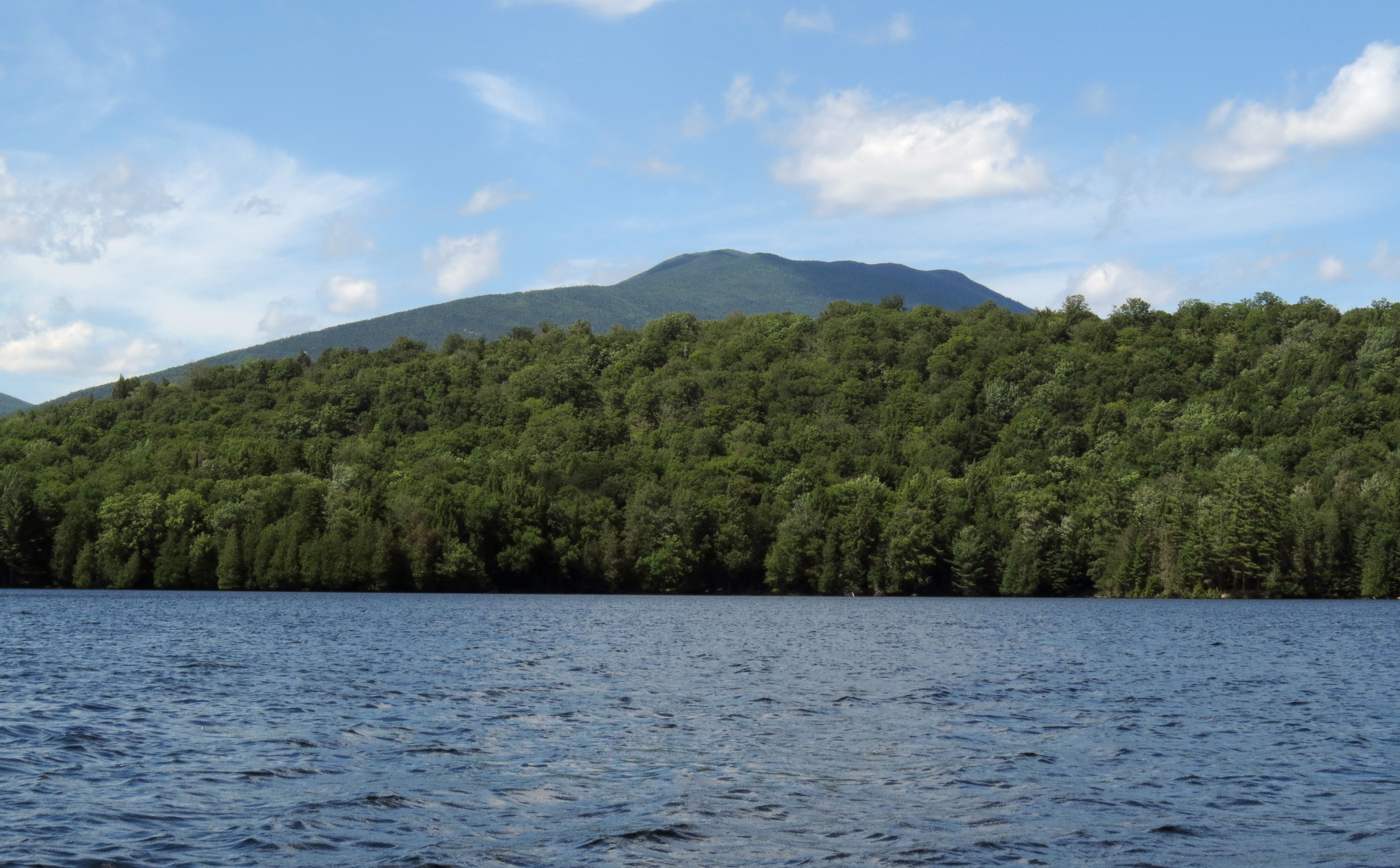
- Santanoni Peak looking north from Newcomb Lake

- Location within New York
- Location: Essex County, New York
- Coordinates: 44°00′36″N 74°07′52″W
- Type: lake
- Basin countries: United States
- Surface area: 446 acres (180 ha)
- Surface elevation: 1,736 ft (529 m)

Newcomb Lake is a 446-acre (180 ha) natural lake in the Adirondack Park in the town of Newcomb, New York; it is the site of the historic Adirondack Great Camp, Camp Santanoni. It is accessible via a five-mile foot trail from New York State Route 28N. There are six campsites and two leantos maintained by the state.

== Sources ==
- New York State Department of Environmental Conservation: Newcomb Lake (pdf)
- New York State Department of Environmental Conservation: Camp Santanoni Historic Area
