= Perch Lake (New York) =

- Location within New York Perch Lake (the United States)
- Location: Jefferson County, New York, United States
- Coordinates: 44°05′45″N 75°56′02″W
- Type: Reservoir
- Primary inflows: Perch River, Gillette Creek
- Primary outflows: Perch River
- Basin countries: United States
- Surface area: 905 acres (3.66 km^{2})
- Max. depth: 10 feet (3.0 m)
- Shore length^{1}: 10.7 miles (17.2 km)
- Surface elevation: 318 feet (97 m)
- Settlements: Noseville, New York
- ^{1} Shore length is not a well-defined measure.

Perch Lake is a reservoir located by Noseville, New York. The Perch River flows through the lake. Perch Lake is shallow, stained, and weedy and the lake bottom is a simple bowl-like structure, with deep silt adjoining the wetlands and sand. Only ice fishing is allowed on the lake. The fish species present are yellow perch, black crappie, bullhead, northern pike, and white sucker. The lake is known to produce northern pike up to 12 pounds.
