= Oxbow lake (disambiguation) =

An oxbow lake is a U-shaped lake that forms when a wide meander from the main stem of a river is cut off, creating a free-standing body of water.

Oxbow Lake may also refer to:

- Oxbow Lake (New York), a lake in Hamilton County, New York, United States
- Oxbow Lake (Virginia), a lake in Saint Paul, Virginia, United States
- "Oxbow Lakes", a single by ambient house artists The Orb

== See also ==
- Oxbow (disambiguation)
