= Oxbow Park =

Oxbow Park may refer to:

- Oxbow Park (Seattle), a public park in Seattle
- Oxbow Park and Zollman Zoo, a campground and zoo in Olmsted County, Minnesota
- Oxbow Regional Park, a nature preserve in Oregon

== See also ==
- Oxbow (disambiguation)
