= Oxbow (disambiguation) =

An oxbow is part of oxen tack: a u-shaped collar, the upper parts of which are fastened to a yoke.

Oxbow also commonly refers to a wide meander in a river; the land enclosed by such a loop; or, when the meander is cut off, the resulting oxbow lake.

Oxbow may also refer to:

== Arts and entertainment ==
- Oxbow (band), a music group from San Francisco
- "Oxbow", a song from the album Saint Cloud by Waxahatchee
- The Oxbow, an 1836 painting by Thomas Cole

== Communities ==
=== Canada ===
- Oxbow, New Brunswick, a community
- Oxbow, Saskatchewan, a town

=== United States ===
- Oxbow Estates, Arizona, a census-designated place
- Oxbow, Maine, an unincorporated township
- Oxbow, New York, a hamlet
- Oxbow, North Dakota, a small city
- Oxbow, Oregon, a populated place
- Oxbo, Wisconsin, an unincorporated community

== Parks and historical sites ==
=== Canada ===
- Oxbow National Historic Site, an historic place in Northumberland County, New Brunswick, Canada

=== United States ===
- Oxbow Archeological District, near Midland, Michigan
- Oxbow Historic District, in northern Newbury, Vermont
- Oxbow National Wildlife Refuge, in Middlesex and Worcester counties in Massachusetts
- Oxbow Park (Seattle), a public park in Washington state
- Oxbow Park and Zollman Zoo, a campground and zoo located in Olmsted County, Minnesota
- Oxbow Regional Park, a natural area park in Oregon

== Waterways, lakes, and dams ==
- The Oxbow (Connecticut River), a body of water in Northampton, Massachusetts, and subject of a Thomas Cole painting
- Oxbow Creek, a tributary of Tunkhannock Creek in Wyoming County, Pennsylvania
- Oxbow Dam, located on the Snake River at the Idaho-Oregon border
- Oxbow Inlet, a tributary of Oxbow Creek in Wyoming County, Pennsylvania
- Oxbow Lake (New York), in Hamilton County, New York
- Oxbow Lake (Virginia), in Saint Paul, Virginia

== Other uses ==
- Oxbow (horse), the 2013 Preakness Stakes winner
- Oxbow (surfwear), a French sporting equipment and apparel company
- Oxbow Books, a UK archaeology publisher and bookseller
- Oxbow Airport, adjacent to Oxbow, Saskatchewan, Canada
- Oxbow code, fragments of program code that were once needed but which are now never used
- Oxbow complex, a Late Archaic period complex situated in the Northern Great Plains
- Oxbow Corporation, an American energy company owned by Bill Koch
- Oxbow orthohantavirus, an RNA virus
- Oxbow School, a single semester high school in Napa, California
- Ox-Bow School of Art and Artists Residency, in Saugatuck, Michigan
