= Mason Lake (disambiguation) =

Mason Lake is the name of the following bodies of water in the United States:

- Mason Lake (New York)
- Mason Lake, Washington
- Mason Lake (King County), Washington
- Mason Lake, in Pedlar Wildlife Management Area, West Virginia

== See also ==
- Lake Mason National Wildlife Refuge, Montana
- Lake Mason (New Zealand) - see Lake Sumner
