= Fawn Lake =

Fawn Lake may refer to:

- Fawn Lake (Lake Pleasant, Hamilton County, New York)
- Fawn Lake Township, Todd County, Minnesota
