= Lake Pleasant, New York =

- Town
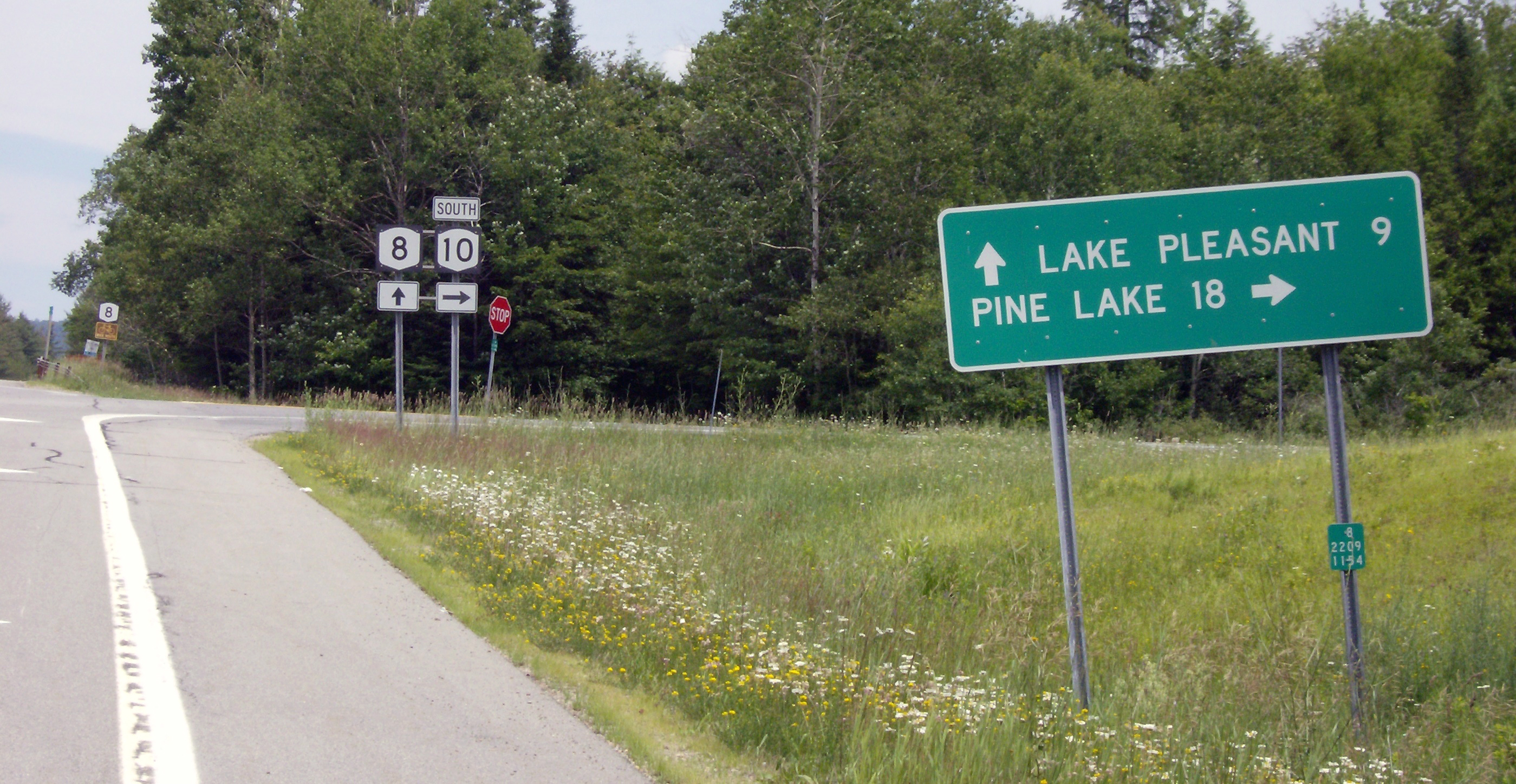
- Route 8 near Lake Pleasant

- Location in Hamilton County and the state of New York
- Coordinates: 43°28′N 74°25′W
- Country: United States
- State: New York
- County: Hamilton

Government
  - Type: Town Council
  - Town Supervisor: Betsey Bain (R)
  - Town Council: Members' List: • Neil McGovern (R); • Donald Braunius (R); • Cristine Meixner (R); • Nancy Seifts (R)

Area
  - Total: 197.98 sq mi (512.77 km^{2})
  - Land: 187.99 sq mi (486.88 km^{2})
  - Water: 10.00 sq mi (25.90 km^{2})
- Elevation: 1,831 ft (558 m)

Population (2020)
  - Total: 897
  - Estimate (2023): 897
  - Density: 4.77/sq mi (1.84/km^{2})
- Time zone: UTC-5 (Eastern (EST))
  - Summer (DST): UTC-4 (EDT)
- ZIP Codes: 12108 (Lake Pleasant); 12164 (Speculator)
- Area code: 518
- FIPS code: 36-041-40794
- GNIS feature ID: 0979129
- Website: Town of Lake Pleasant

Lake Pleasant is a town in Hamilton County, New York, United States. The population was 897 at the 2020 census. It contains the hamlet of Lake Pleasant, the county seat of Hamilton County.

The town of Lake Pleasant is within the Adirondack Park and is centrally located in the county. The town is a tourist hub, with seasonal homes comprising about three-quarters of the housing units in the area. Between Memorial Day and Labor Day, the unofficial summer season, the small town is a busy community, with many activities including a parade, fireworks, summer musical, camping, hiking, water activities, historical activities, art show, geocaching, and mountain biking.

== History ==
=== Native Americans ===
Archaeological evidence of Native Americans has been found in arrowheads and spearheads near the shores of Lake Pleasant. Many historians believe Lake Pleasant was the hunting and fishing grounds of both Mohawk and Algonquin tribes. These Native Americans would travel to the Adirondack Mountains to hunt only during the warm months, while their villages were located in the Mohawk and Hudson Valley regions.

There was a Mohawk man, who named himself Captain Gill, who lived in a wigwam at the outlet of Lake Pleasant during the end of the eighteenth century and the beginning of the nineteenth century. He had a wife named Molly, who had a daughter named Molly Jr., although Capt. Gill didn't claim the daughter as his own. Old Capt. Gill was a trail guide for the first settlers. He would show them places to hunt and fish. Capt. Gill was most famous for his story telling and would tell folklore of the Iroquois nation. One story told of a forgotten tribe that lived year-round near Round Lake (now known as Sacandaga Lake) near the present-day hamlet of Lake Pleasant. This tribe had their village on a hill which is now behind the Hamilton County buildings. The legend talks about an evil deed the tribe did and the Flying Head that came out of Lake Sacandaga and chased them out of the Adirondack Mountains.

=== First settlers ===
The first settlers arrived around 1795; this area was then a part of the town of Mayfield in Montgomery County.

The early town was once described as "A wild waste...so poor that nobody inclines to settle in it."

The inexpensive land was offered by New York City landowners to induce settlement. Heavily forested majestic mountains, abundant game for food and furs, and numerous lakes and streams full of fish awaited the first settlers. A few hardy pioneers came to the wilderness, cleared the land and built self-sufficient farms. They built gristmills and sawmills for local use. All seemed good except for the heavy snows and lack of good roads, which meant they were isolated in the winter and muddy spring.

A short cool summer growing season meant adopting their farming to crops that would survive to feed themselves and livestock. Sheep were the main livestock and did well on the rocky hillsides, and cloth was manufactured in many homes. Wild animals such as wolves, coyotes, bobcats and mountain lions had to be dealt with. Apple orchards were planted with some success. A few mills to craft woodenware and tools were built. Some of the first settlers found income from shingle making, and nearly every building was roofed with these wooden shingles. Small dairies supplied butter, cheese, and milk to neighbors and later to logging camps and large hotels. Development was slow and deprivation was numerous. Many settlers left to be closer to their families where farm land was richer and jobs that offered a steady income could be found. Several small settlements separated by distance and a lack of passable roads soon became small towns. The large area was impractical to govern, and the Montgomery County courthouse was 60 miles (97 km) away. In 1805, the town of Wells was established, which included the area of Lake Pleasant.

Lake Pleasant was formed in 1812 from part of the town of Wells, before the formation of Hamilton County, with about 300 residents. It was a large area with scattered settlements and large reaching boundaries. It extended north indefinitely and to the west to the Herkimer County line. Hamilton County became a provisional county in 1816 but since it lacked enough residents it was counted along with Montgomery County.

=== War of 1812 ===
The United States declared war on Great Britain on June 18, 1812. The settlers of Wells and Lake Pleasant were afraid of potential attacks from Native Americans who allied with the British Empire to attack American settlements. The Native Americans (yet unknown what tribe or nation) were seen roaming in the forest hunting, trapping and fishing. Despite no attacks, the Lake Pleasant settlers who considered themselves on the northern frontier boundary of the St. Lawrence, fled their homes and scattered themselves in the counties of Saratoga, Rensselaer and Montgomery. All inhabitants except the Peck family left Lake Pleasant, and so did a large majority of Wells. An application was made by a remaining few settlers to the New York Governor Daniel D. Tompkins for an order to raise a company of volunteers from Lake Pleasant and Wells to create a militia in order to allay the fears of the inhabitants, to protect them from a possible massacre and to encourage them to return to their homes. The petition was granted, and William B. Peck was commissioned captain of the Wells and Lake Pleasant Home Guards of Company C under Montgomery County's Militia 122 regiment. Lt. John L. Francisco later took command of the militia when Peck retired from his post.

The War of 1812 brought a need for roads to be built so the US could invade Canada. A military road was created through the town to reach the St. Lawrence River so men and provisions could be transported easily into Canadian territory.

=== Transformation of Lake Pleasant ===
The town of Lake Pleasant was formed in 1812 from the town of Wells. Lake Pleasant was a "mother town" of Hamilton County, and other towns were made, in whole or part, by removing parts of its territory: Morehouse (1835), Arietta (1836), part of Long Lake (1837), part of Gilmantown (1839−1860), part of Hope (1847), part of Wells (1858), and part of Indian Lake (1861).

Gilmantown stretched over 40 miles (64 km) from Wells to Long Lake and was soon recognized as impractical; the land was annexed to Lake Pleasant and Wells. Gradually settlement continued and two communities developed about 4 miles (6 km) apart near the waters of Lake Pleasant. In 1844, the community of Lake Pleasant was also known as "Sageville" after Hezekiah Sage built a hotel and attempted to rename the community after himself. In 1897, the town's name returned to Lake Pleasant.

The small settlement at the foot of the lake was Lake Pleasant until 1864 when Joel Newton built a small store and hotel in the center of town and secured a post office with the name "Newton's Corners". At that time Page Hill and Page Street were included in Newton's Corners. Joel Newton's structure burned in 1870, and in 1872 the Newton's Corners post office was reopened in Satterlee's store. Henry Dunning built a hotel in 1882 where Newton's hotel had been and the post office had moved there, and 1896 the community received a new name, Speculator, after the mountain seen across the lake.

In 1892, a few ambitious and industrious business leaders felt they needed to update and modernize their facilities. Speculator was a "booming Mecca" for tourists. With the support of the voters in 1925, the village of Speculator was "incorporated" with a mayor and two trustees, which later changed to four trustees. The village of Speculator purchased a small water system of Dexter Slack and expanded it. The village had a generating plant and waterwheel installed at Christine Falls, and by 1926 they had electricity.

=== Age of tourism ===
Growth escalated in the Victorian era between the mid-1800s and the early 1900s. Whole families spent their summers enjoying the mountain hospitality and fresh air. Several more hotels were built to accommodate them, and eventually more stores, homes and several cottages were built. Around the 1850s, city sportsmen began to come to the Adirondack Mountains to hunt, fish, and enjoy expeditions into the deep woods. They hired local men who knew the area to be guides. The guides provided food and crude lean-tos for shelter. Hunting shanties were later widely used. With these sportsmen came their whole families to use the many hotels and boardinghouses in Lake Pleasant and Speculator. Private summer camps and cottages were built, as well as family and children's camps, such as Camp of the Woods, Camp Setag for girls, Kamp Kun-ju-muk for boys, the YMCA Camp Agaming, and Deerfoot Lodge for boys, around the shores of local lakes.

After World War I, famous athletes came to practice in the isolated communities, such as Gene Tunney, Max Schmeling, and Max Baer, who arrived to train for the heavyweight championship fight.

=== Age of lumbering ===
In the beginning, small sawmills provided lumber for local use. After the Civil War, large lumber companies were formed and mills were built near the Glens Falls area. At first logging was prevalent along the upper Hudson River, which was used to float the logs to the mills. Later logging operations moved into Lake Pleasant, and the Sacandaga River was used to float logs to Glens Falls. The state of New York designated rivers as public highways for moving logs to the larger companies. Many local farmers found winter employment with these companies as well as supplying the companies with potatoes, meat, and dairy products and hay and feed for the horses. The lumber companies bought large parcels of land for their timber. Some of this land was later abandoned and became state land. This was the beginning of the Adirondack Park as designated in 1892.

== Geography ==
According to the United States Census Bureau, the town has a total area of 198.0 square miles (512.8 km^{2}), of which 188.0 square miles (486.9 km^{2}) are land and 10.0 square miles (25.9 km^{2}), or 5.05%, are water.

New York State Route 8, an east–west highway, and New York State Route 30, a north–south highway, intersect at the "Four Corners" in the village of Speculator.

The Sacandaga River, a tributary of the Hudson River, flows out through the eastern border of the town.

== Demographics ==
Historical population
Census	Pop.	Note	%±
1820	312		—
1830	266		−14.7%
1840	296		11.3%
1850	305		3.0%
1860	356		16.7%
1870	318		−10.7%
1880	343		7.9%
1890	416		21.3%
1900	469		12.7%
1910	458		−2.3%
1920	393		−14.2%
1930	540		37.4%
1940	584		8.1%
1950	696		19.2%
1960	718		3.2%
1970	812		13.1%
1980	859		5.8%
1990	887		3.3%
2000	876		−1.2%
2010	781		−10.8%
2020	897		14.9%
2023 (est.)	897		0.0%
U.S. Decennial Census

As of the census of 2000, there were 876 people, 388 households, and 256 families residing in the town. The population density was 4.7 inhabitants per square mile (1.8/km^{2}). There were 1,429 housing units at an average density of 7.6 per square mile (2.9/km^{2}). The racial makeup of the town was 97.49% White, 1.03% African American, 0.11% Native American, 0.34% Asian, 0.80% from other races, and 0.23% from two or more races. Hispanic or Latino of any race were 1.03% of the population.

There were 388 households, out of which 23.2% had children under the age of 18 living with them, 57.7% were married couples living together, 4.4% had a female householder with no husband present, and 34.0% were non-families. 31.2% of all households were made up of individuals, and 13.4% had someone living alone who was 65 years of age or older. The average household size was 2.19 and the average family size was 2.70.

In the town, the population was spread out, with 18.6% under the age of 18, 5.6% from 18 to 24, 25.2% from 25 to 44, 27.7% from 45 to 64, and 22.8% who were 65 years of age or older. The median age was 45 years. For every 100 females, there were 108.1 males. For every 100 females age 18 and over, there were 104.3 males.

The median income for a household in the town was $31,467, and the median income for a family was $39,766. Males had a median income of $28,523 versus $23,194 for females. The per capita income for the town was $19,259. Below the poverty line were 7.1% of people, 5.2% of families, 10.8% of those under 18 and 3.6% of those over 64.

== Communities and locations in Lake Pleasant ==
=== Inhabited places ===
- Lake Pleasant – This hamlet, the county seat, was also called "Sageville" in the past.
- Moffitt Beach State Campground – A state camping facility at the eastern end of Sacandaga Lake.
- Oak Mountain – A location north of Speculator.
- Perkins Clearing – An old lumber camp location on Jessup River Road, west of NY-30.
- Sacandaga Camp – A community on NY-8 between Lake Pleasant hamlet and the Village of Speculator.
- Sled Harbor – A location west of Perkins Clearing where travelers once changed from motorized transport to horse drawn.
- Speculator - The Village of Speculator is the only incorporated village in Hamilton County, and was formerly called "Newtons Corners."

=== Geographical features ===
- Blue Ridge Mountain – An elevation in the northern part of the town.
- Buckhorn Lake – A small lake at the town line in the southwest.
- Cedar River Flow – An artificial lake in the northern part of Lake Pleasant.
- Fawn Lake – A lake west of Sacandaga Lake.
- Gilman Lake – A small lake adjacent to NY-30 by the eastern town line.
- Hamilton Lake – A small lake south of Lake Pleasant Lake.
- Indian Lake – The southern end of this large lake is in the northern part of Lake Pleasant.
- Lake Pleasant – The name of a lake that gives its name to both the town and the county seat, located south of NY-8 and the Village of Speculator.
- Lewey Lake – A lake in the northern part of the town.
- Lewey Mountain – An elevation in the northern part of the town, west of Lewey Lake.
- Mason Lake – A lake located north of Perkins Clearing.
- Owl Pond – A lake on the eastern town line.
- Mud Lake – A small lake north of Sacandaga Lake.
- Oxbow Lake – A lake at the western town line, next to NY-8.
- Sacandada Lake – One of the large lakes in the town, north of Lake Pleasant and NY-8.
- Sacandaga Outlet − A short river, flowing between Sacandaga Lake and Lake Pleasant, under New York Highway 8
- Sacandaga River, A river that rises in the town and flows out the eastern town line
- Speculator Mountain – A mountain south of the Village of Speculator. Its height is 2,977 feet (907 meters). It gave its name to the Village of Speculator.
- Vly Lake – a small lake at the western town line, west of Fawn Lake.
- Wakely Dam – A location in the northern part of the town at the north end of Cedar River Flow, east entrance to the Moose River Plains Wilderness Area.
- Whitaker Lake – A lake east of NY Highway 30.

== Notable person ==
- Eleanor Macomber (1801–1840), missionary, teacher
