= Grace Methodist Church Complex =

Historic church in New York, United States

- U.S. National Register of Historic Places
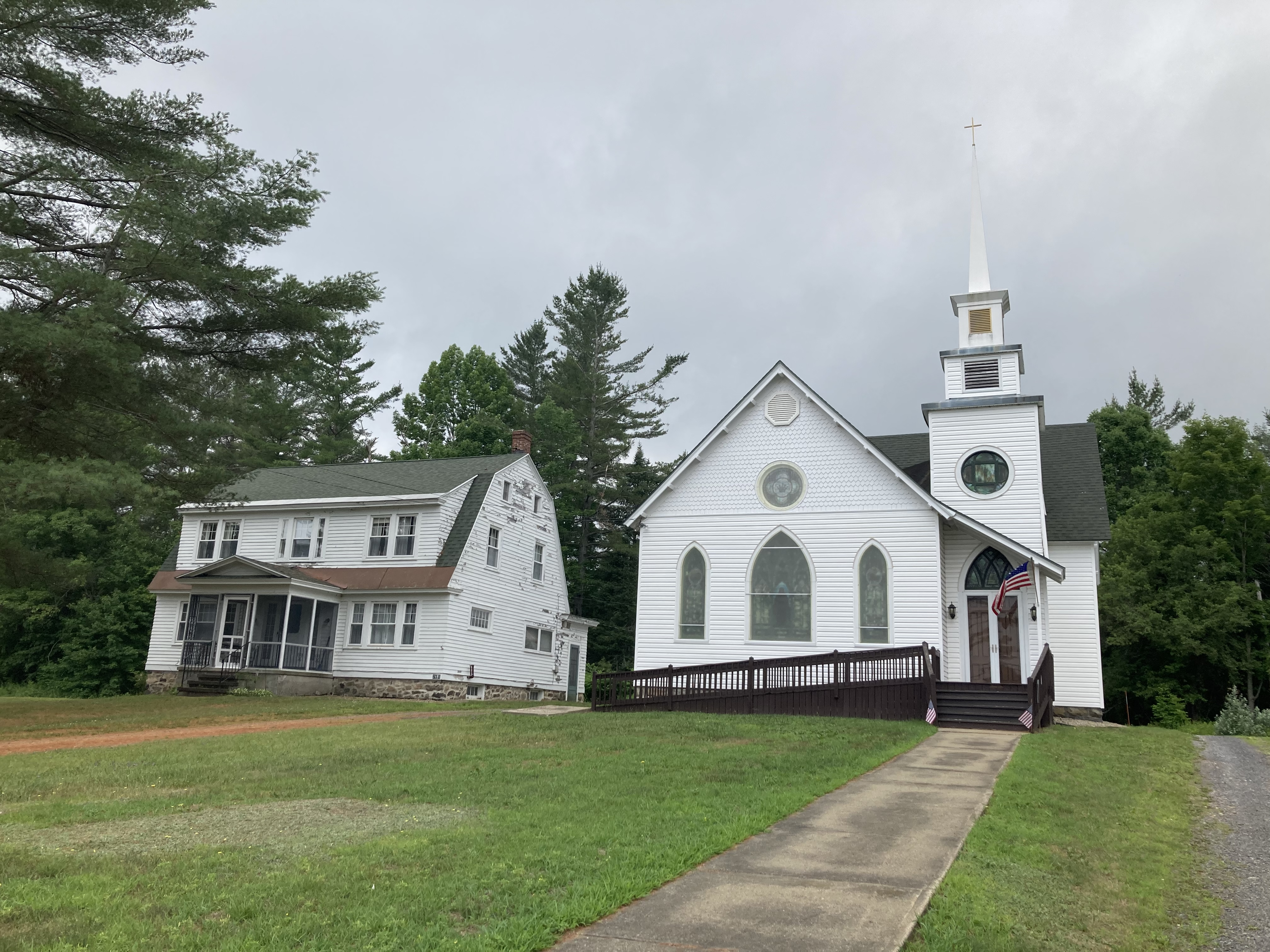
- The parsonage (left) and the church pictured in 2025.

- Location within New York Location within the United States
- Location: 2895 NY 8, Speculator, New York
- Coordinates: 43°30′02″N 74°22′04″W
- Area: 0.82 acres (0.33 ha)
- Built: c. 1908-1909, 1928
- Built by: Blowers, Cyrus
- Architect: Benjamin D. Price
- Architectural style: Gothic, Colonial Revival
- NRHP reference No.: 15000006
- Added to NRHP: February 12, 2015

The Grace Methodist Church Complex, also known as Mountain Community Methodist Church, is a historic Methodist church complex located at Speculator, Hamilton County, New York. The church was built in 1909 and is a compact Gothic Revival style frame church. It has an engaged bell tower and a concrete block Sunday School wing added in 1957. The front facade features three symmetrically placed Gothic-arched windows. The parsonage was built in 1928, and is a two-story wood-frame building with a gambrel roof and dormers in the Dutch Colonial Revival style.

The church was built to a standard plan design by Benjamin D. Price and is very similar to the 1903 Methodist church in nearby Indian Lake, with an identical steeple and similar layouts. Memorial stained glass windows at Grace Methodist Church set it apart from similarly designed churches.

It was added to the National Register of Historic Places in 2015. Alongside the Methodist church in nearby Lake Pleasant, The church is part of a two-point parish called Mountain Community Methodist Church. The church disaffiliated from the United Methodist Church in 2024 and is part of the Global Methodist Church.
