= Hamilton County Courthouse Complex =

- Hamilton County Courthouse Complex.
- U.S. National Register of Historic Places
- New York State Register of Historic Places
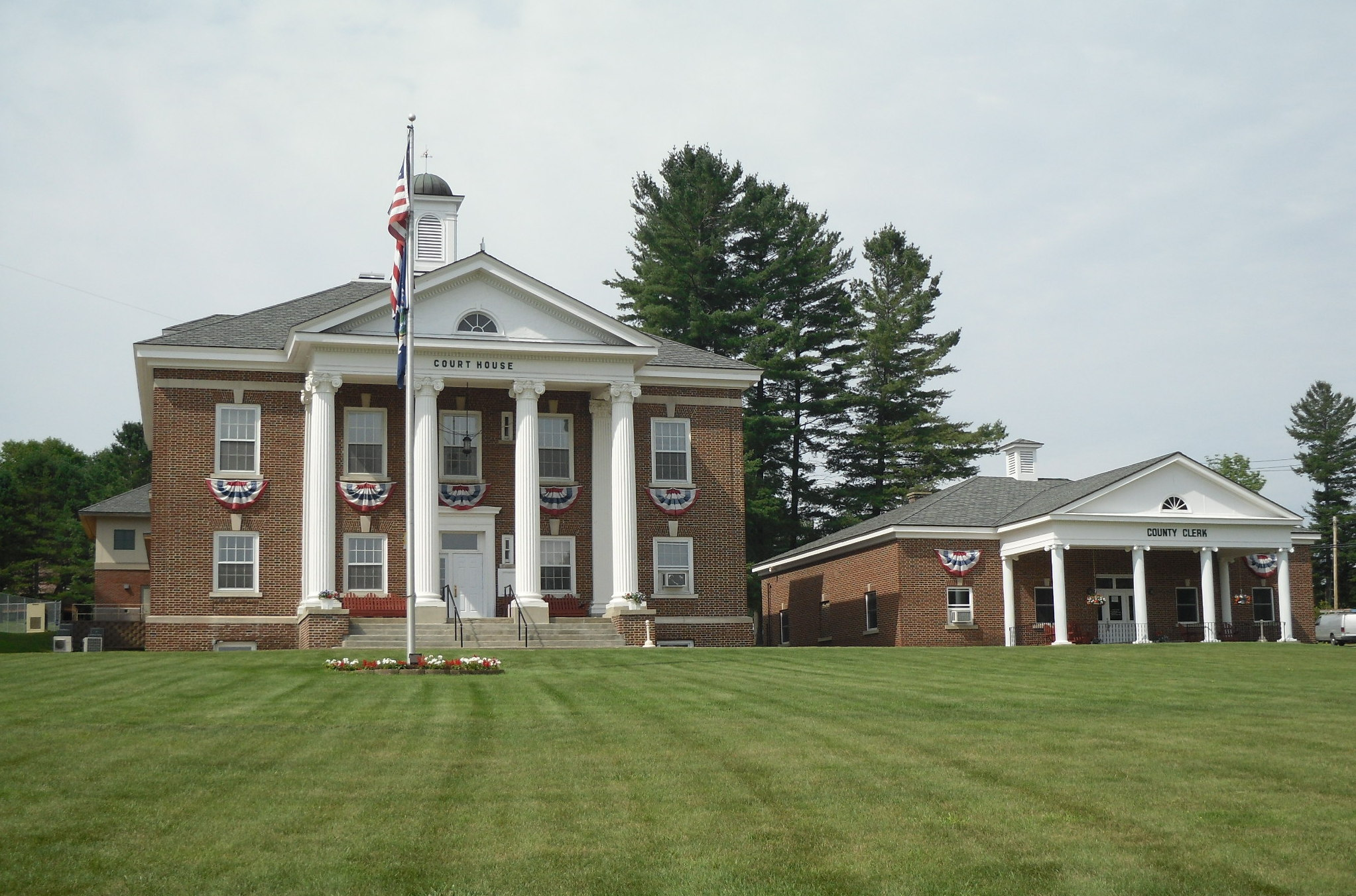
- Hamilton County Courthouse and Clerks Office, August 2010

- Location within New York Location within the United States
- Location: Jct. of NY 8 and S. Shore Rd., Lake Pleasant, New York
- Coordinates: 43°28′13″N 74°24′45″W
- Area: 4 acres (1.6 ha)
- Built: 1848, 1929
- Architect: Moffitt, Josiah; Et al.
- Architectural style: Colonial Revival, Greek Revival
- NRHP reference No.: 92001280
- NYSRHP No.: 04106.000011

Significant dates
- Added to NRHP: September 24, 1992
- Designated NYSRHP: August 5, 1992

Hamilton County Courthouse Complex is a historic courthouse complex located at Lake Pleasant in Hamilton County, New York, United States. The complex consists of three buildings: an 1848 Greek Revival style stone jail with 1940 stone addition, the 1929 brick courthouse, and county clerk's office building, also built in 1929. The jail is considered a rare example of its type from before the Civil War. The Colonial Revival style buildings added in 1929 feature large porticos and cupolas and replaced the original 1843 wood-frame courthouse and clerk's office.

It was added to the National Register of Historic Places in 1992.

== Gallery ==
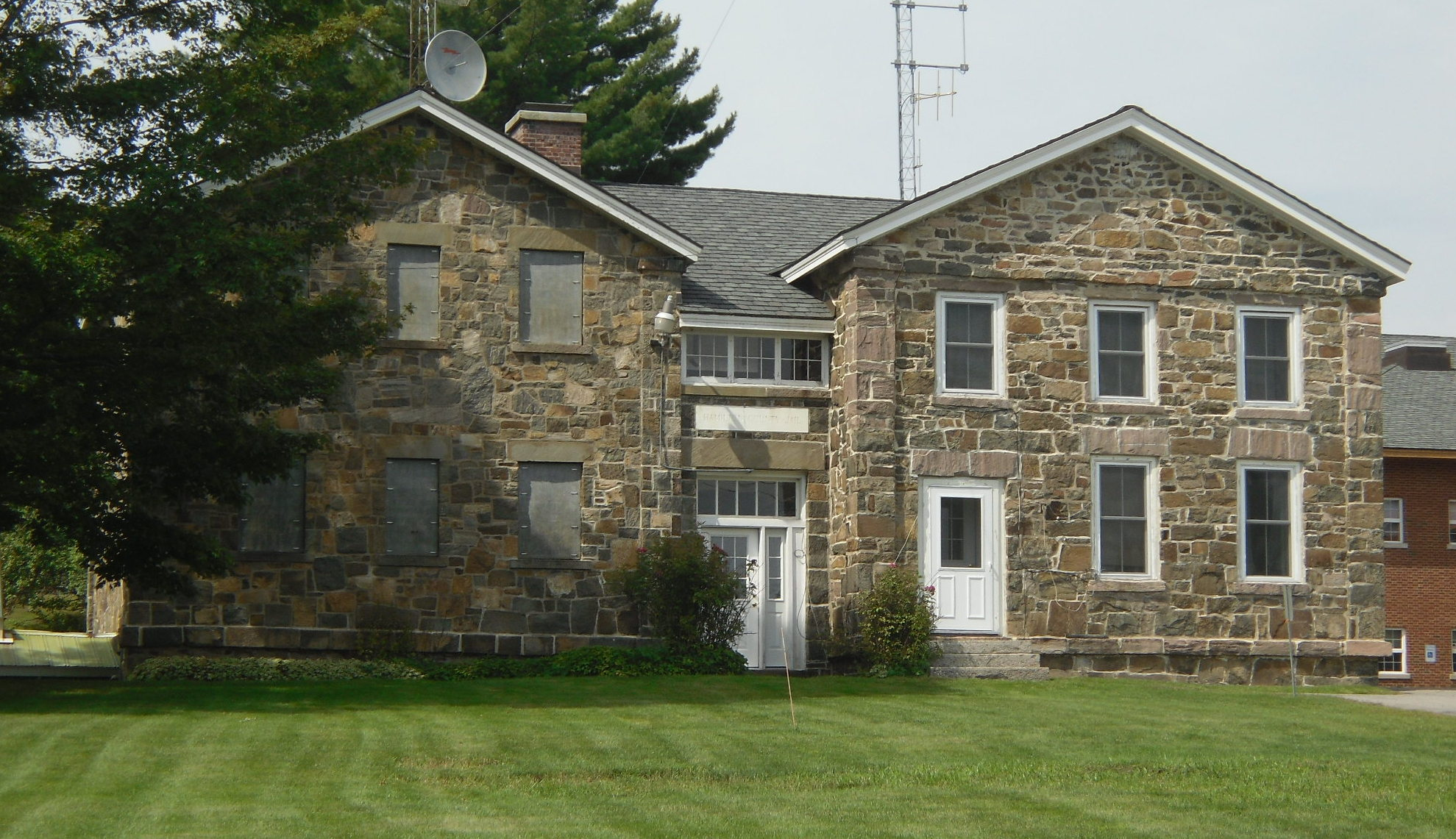
Jail building, August 2010
