= Norm Sonju =

American basketball executive (born 1938)

Norm Sonju (born 1938) is an American former basketball executive. Along with Donald Carter, Sonju co-founded the Dallas Mavericks of the National Basketball Association (NBA), and was the team's president and general manager from 1980 to 1996. He was also the president and general manager of the NBA's Buffalo Braves from 1977 to 1978.

== Early life ==
Sonju was born in 1938. He grew up in Chicago, Illinois and played high school basketball at Carl Schurz High School, where he was a starting guard. He played college basketball at Grinnell College, and missed the second half of his senior season due to a leg injury.

Sonju joined the United States Air Force after college and played basketball on a service team. He had a few professional basketball tryouts, but his basketball playing career ended in 1964 when he suffered chest, knee, back, and face injuries in a head-on collision in Michigan.

== Career ==
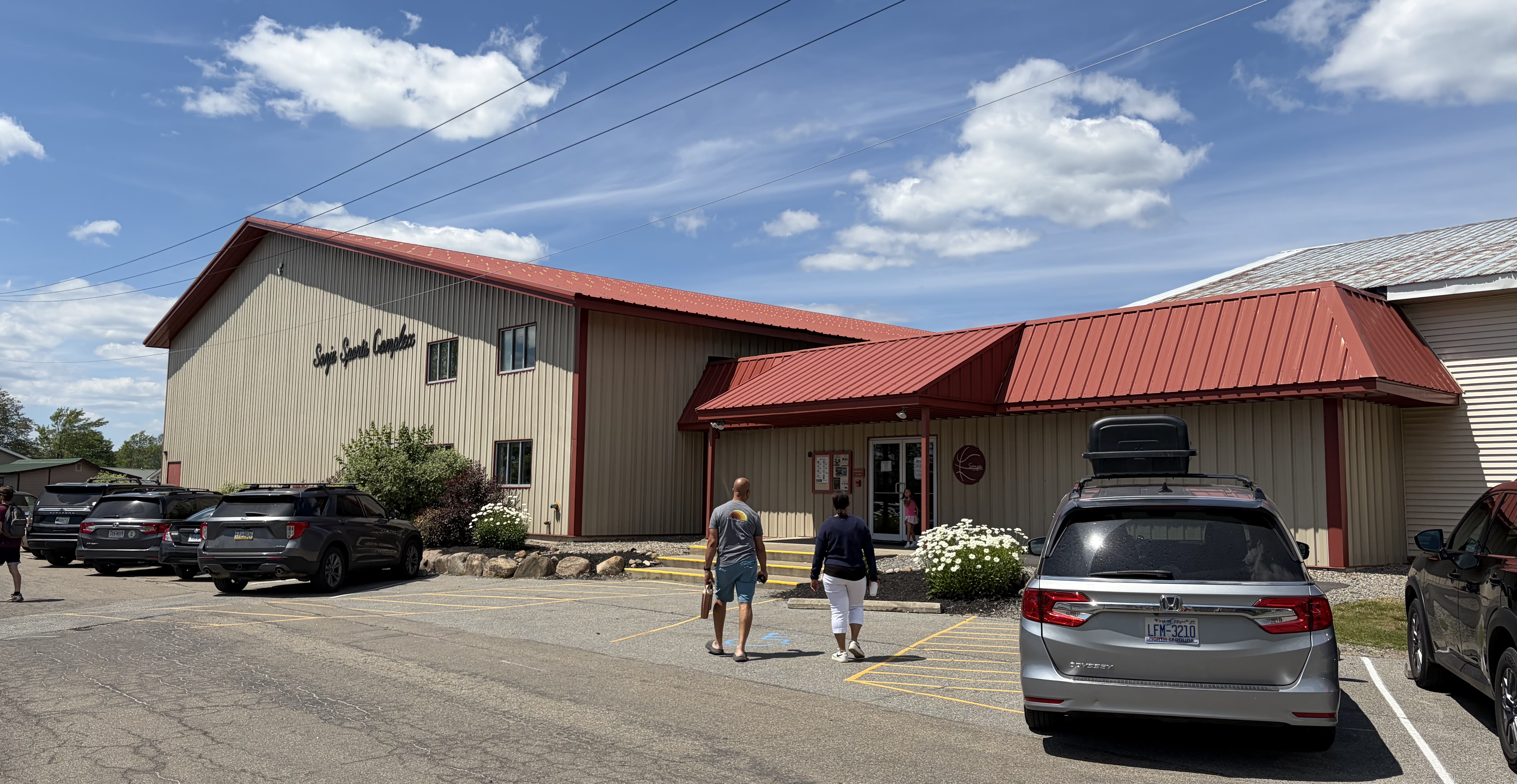
The Sonju Sports Complex at Camp of the Woods in Speculator, New York

After the automobile collision, Sonju enrolled at the University of Chicago, and graduated with a Master of Business Administration in marketing after two years. He spent a short time as the head basketball coach at George Williams College. By 1976, he had become a "high-salaried" executive with Servicemasters Industries. Sonju had also created a basketball camp for kids at Camp of the Woods in the Adirondack Mountains, frequented by NBA players and coaches.

In 1977, new Buffalo Braves owner John Y. Brown Jr. hired Sonju to be the team's president and general manager; he held that position for the final nine games of the 1976–77 season and the entire 1977–78 season. With the Braves struggling financially, Sonju thought about moving the team to Dallas, Texas. After the 1977–78 season, the Braves moved to San Diego, California, to become the San Diego Clippers; all of the Buffalo staff was fired (including Sonju).

For several years, Sonju tried to round up investors for an NBA franchise in Dallas. A franchise was awarded in May 1980, with Donald Carter providing most of the capital. Sonju served as the Dallas Mavericks president and general manager from 1980 until his retirement in 1996. He was a Reagan Republican and a born-again Christian. At one point during his stint as Mavericks GM, he opened weekly staff meetings with a Bible study session and said it was wrong for women to work.

After the 1986 NBA All-Star Game, the first held in Dallas, Sonju bought the court floor for $50,000 and had it shipped to Camp of the Woods; as of 2015, it was still installed there. In 2020, he received the NBA's Jerry Colangelo Award, which is "given to a person in NBA management who lives an exemplary life on and off the basketball court and who does so while expressing high character, leadership and faith." On January 28, 2026, at halftime of the Mavericks game against the Minnesota Timberwolves, Sonju was honored in a ceremony and presented with a framed No. 80 Mavericks jersey. The first 5,000 fans at the game also received a Norm Sonju bobblehead.
