= St. Paul Historic District (St. Paul, Virginia) =

Historic district in Virginia, United States

- U.S. National Register of Historic Places
- U.S. Historic district
- Virginia Landmarks Register
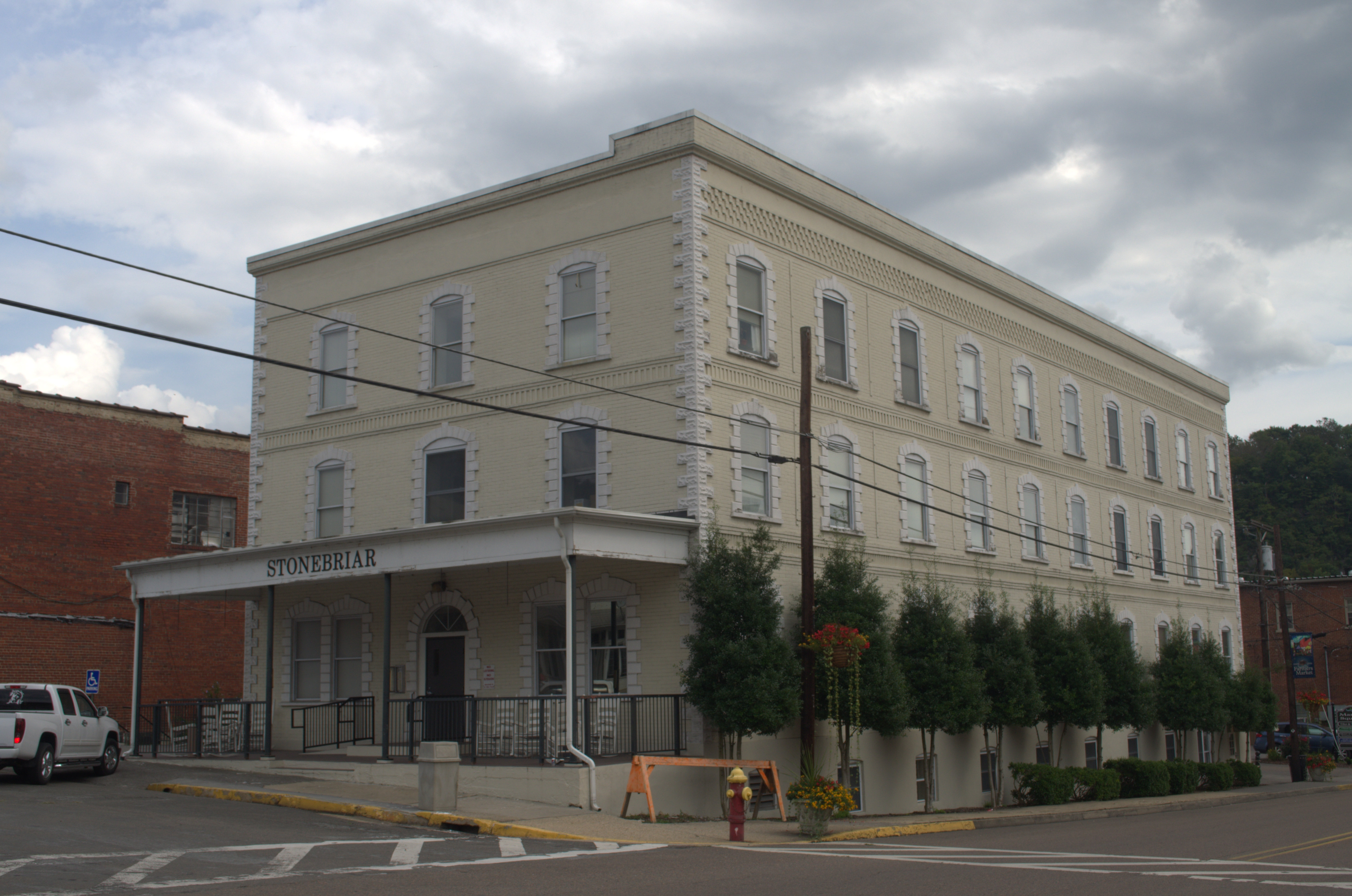
- The Old St. Paul Hotel

- Location within Virginia Location within the United States
- Location: Portions of 4th & 5th Aves., Russell & Broad Sts., St. Paul, Virginia
- Coordinates: 36°54′17″N 82°18′38″W
- Area: 10.84 acres (4.39 ha)
- Built: 1887, 1891, 1911
- NRHP reference No.: 11000351
- VLR No.: 294-0001

Significant dates
- Added to NRHP: June 8, 2011
- Designated VLR: March 17, 2011

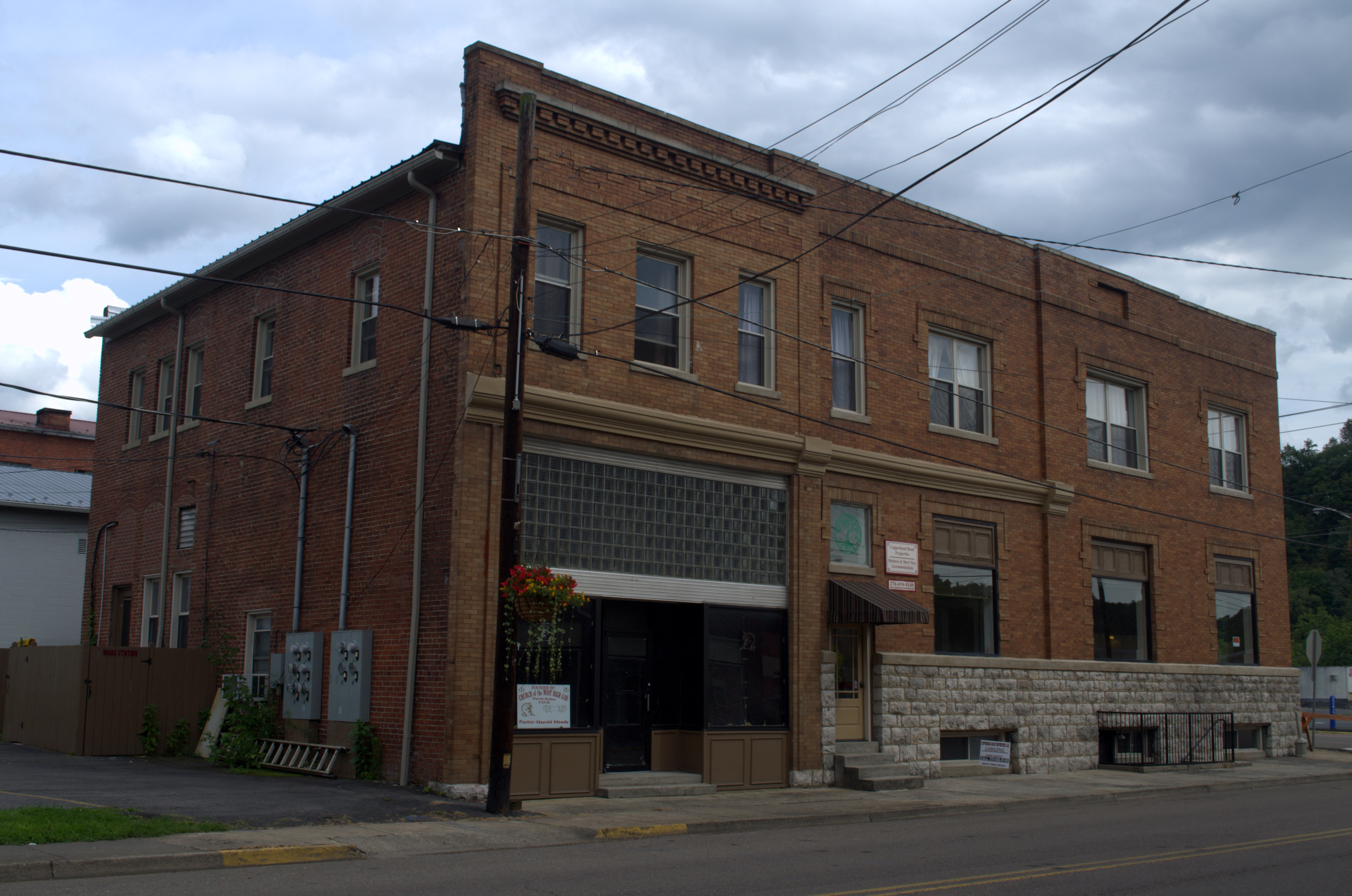
St. Paul National Bank Building

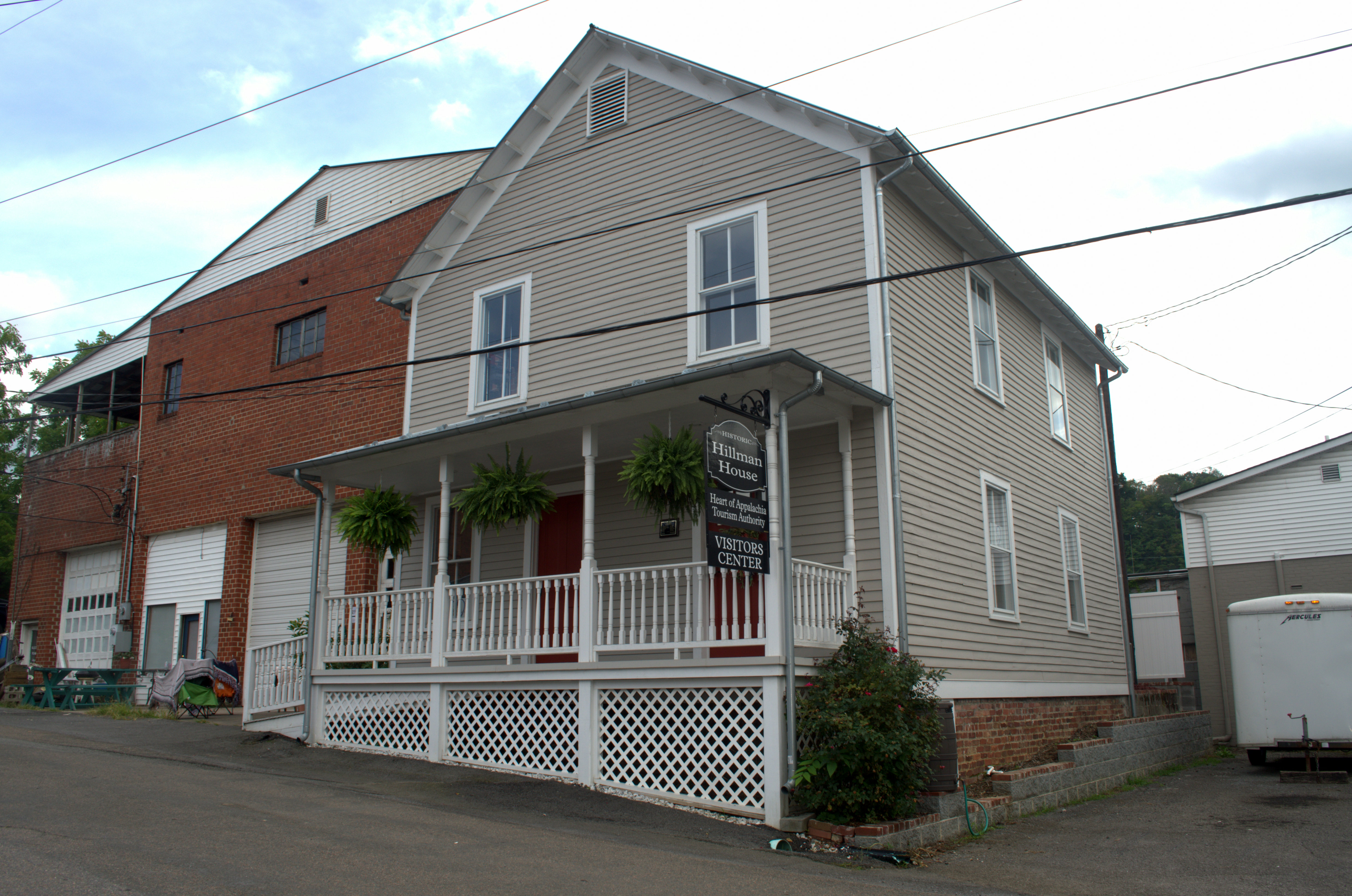
Hillman-Ennis House

St. Paul Historic District is a national historic district located at St. Paul, Wise County, Virginia. It contains 23 contributing buildings and 2 contributing structures in the central business district of St. Paul. Most contributing resources consist of commercial buildings dating from the 1920s to 1950s. Notable buildings include the Ennis House (1887), Hillman/Ennis House (c. 1890), the old St. Paul Hotel (1901), National Bank building (c. 1900), Gaiety Movie Theater (1920s), The Lyric (c. 1950), and Cavalier Theater/ Phillips Building (c. 1955).

It was listed on the National Register of Historic Places in 2011.
