= Lake Pleasant (New York) =

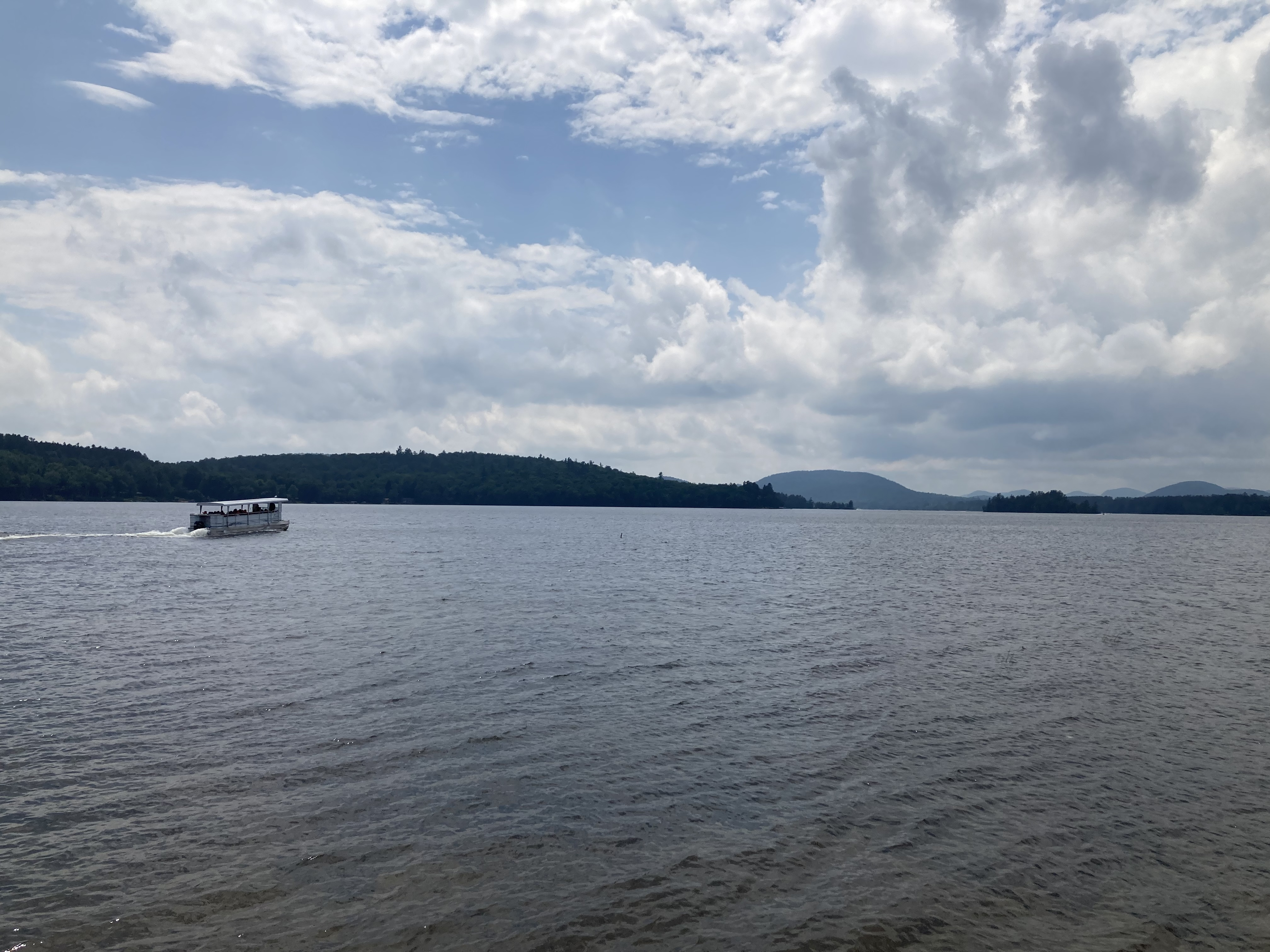
- Lake Pleasant viewed from the Camp of the Woods marina in Speculator.

- Location within New York Lake Pleasant (the United States)
- Location: Adirondack Park, Hamilton County, New York, US
- Coordinates: 43°28′44″N 74°22′37″W
- Type: Lake
- Primary inflows: Sacandaga Lake Outlet, Sucker Brook, Cherry Brook
- Primary outflows: Sacandaga River
- Basin countries: United States
- Max. length: 4 mi (6.4 km)
- Max. width: 1 mi (1.6 km)
- Surface area: 1,475 acres (5.97 km^{2})
- Average depth: 29 feet (8.8 m)
- Max. depth: 62 feet (19 m)
- Shore length^{1}: 9.6 miles (15.4 km)
- Surface elevation: 1,726 feet (526 m)
- Islands: 1
- Settlements: Lake Pleasant, New York
- ^{1} Shore length is not a well-defined measure.

Lake Pleasant is located in the Adirondack Park in New York in the United States. The lake is in the town of Lake Pleasant in Hamilton County.

The lake is about four miles (6.4 km) long and about one mile (1.6 km) wide with its length oriented in an approximate northeast to southwest direction, the widest part at the northeast end. The village of Speculator is at its northern tip, and the hamlet of Lake Pleasant, the county seat, is by the western end. NY Route 8 traverses the north side of the lake, and South Shore Road goes around the south part.

Lake Pleasant is linked to Sacandaga Lake by the Sacandaga Outlet, a small stream that passes under Route 8. The Sacandaga River drains Lake Pleasant and flows out the northern end by Speculator.

The lake is ringed with seasonal and year-round houses. A public beach is at the north end in Speculator. Most commercial development is found along Route 8 and adjacent to Speculator, while the area along South Shore Road is primarily residential.

== Fishing ==
Fish species in the lake are smallmouth bass, walleye, yellow perch, rainbow trout, brown trout, rock bass, chain pickerel, sunfish, and black bullhead. There is a state-owned public hand launch on the north shore near the outlet and also a navigable channel from Sacandaga Lake.
