= Camp of the Woods =

Camp and center in New York, US

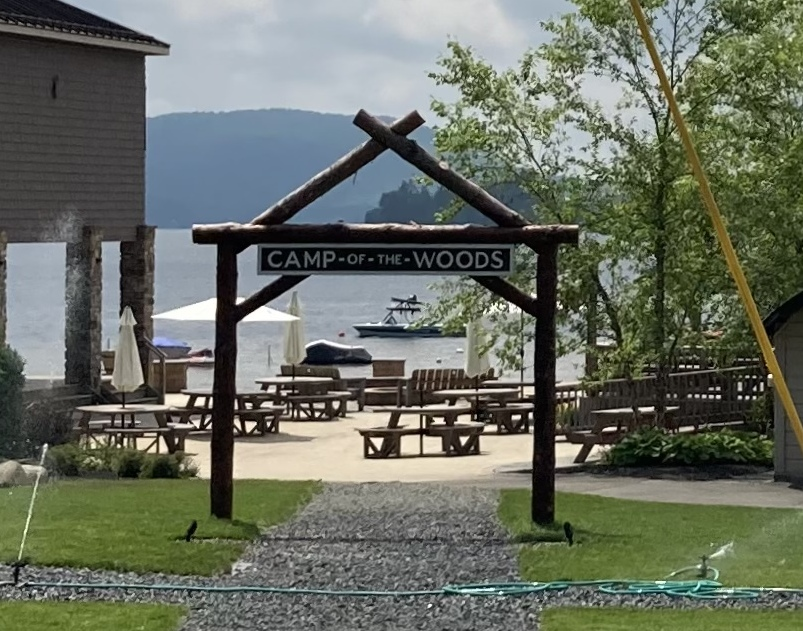
- Camp of the Woods' sign near Lake Pleasant
- Established: 1917; 109 years ago
- Founder: George "Pop" Tibbitts
- Type: Nonprofit
- Registration no.: 59-6001191
- Purpose: Summer camp, family resort
- Location: Speculator, New York, United States
- Coordinates: 43.4925°N 74.3518°W
- Owner: Gospel Volunteers Inc.
- Chairman: Jack Zimmermann
- President and CEO: Jim Hammond
- Affiliations: Christian Camp and Conference Association
- Revenue: US$10,177,396 (2024)
- Expenses: US$10,723,277 (2024)
- Website: camp-of-the-woods.org

Camp of the Woods (stylized as CAMP-of-the-WOODS) is an interdenominational evangelical Christian summer camp and conference facility for families. It is located on the shore of Lake Pleasant in the village of Speculator, New York, United States, in the Adirondack Mountains. The camp traces its origins to a Christian camp on Lake George founded in 1900, with its current site acquired in 1917. Over the 20th century, Camp of the Woods developed a large family camp and summer conference program featuring prominent Christian preachers and speakers with an additional focus on music and sports, as well as a summer camp program for girls called Tapawingo.

== History ==
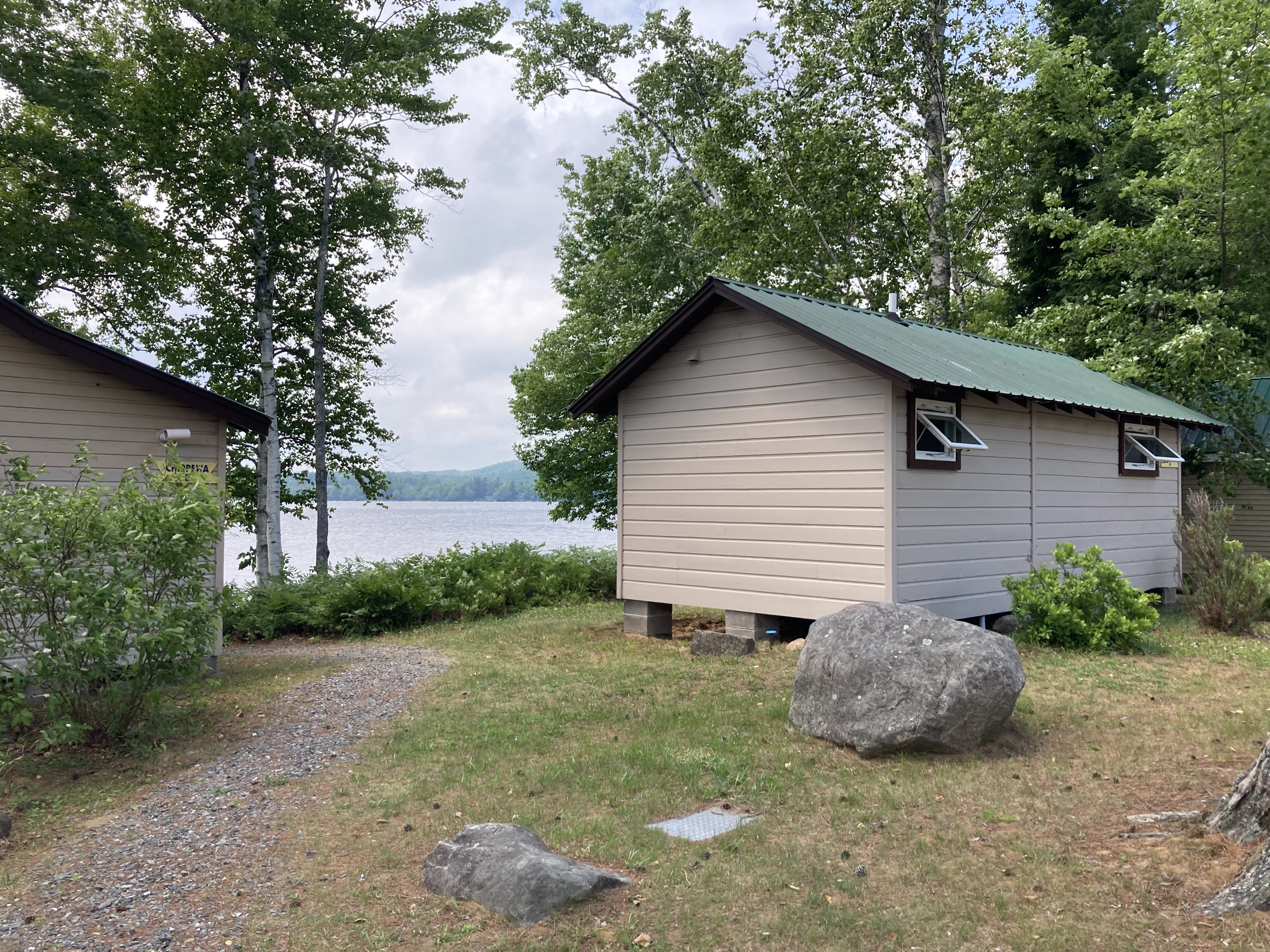
Cabins at Camp of the Woods

In 1900, George "Pop" Tibbitts, a Canadian who had long run YMCA camps, opened a Christian camp called Camp Iroquois on Lake George in the Adirondacks. By 1913, the camp had outgrown its facilities, and in 1914 Tibbitts visited land near the outlet of Lake Pleasant, drawn to the site by the steeples of two churches visible in Speculator and the hamlet of Lake Pleasant. He purchased the 50-acre site in 1917. Tibbitts operated the camps in Speculator and Lake George until 1927, when he sold Camp Iroquois and shifted his focus solely to Camp of the Woods. Unlike YMCA camps, Camp of the Woods welcomed full families from its founding with a capacity of 400 by 1925. The camp received electric power supply starting in 1927.

In 1939, Camp of the Woods opened a large auditorium seating 1,200 facing Lake Pleasant. Tibbitts died in 1948 and is buried on the grounds of Camp of the Woods. He was succeeded by Gordon Purdy, who ran the camp until 1986. Purdy further developed a band and choir program created by Tibbitts that provided music at two services open to the public each Sunday during the camping season, as well as two additional concerts each week.

By 1965, the camp had capacity for 775 guests at any given time and a staff of 160. In addition to music, recreational offerings included sports, swimming, lifeguarding, hiking and canoeing. By mid-century, the camp had established its pattern of welcoming nationally known speakers and Bible teachers for a week at a time throughout the summer camping season.

For 33 years starting in 1983, Camp of the Woods hosted a summer basketball clinic for boys founded by Dallas Mavericks manager Norm Sonju, who also chaired the Camp of the Woods board. Notable individuals who participated in the program included Larry Bird, Uwe Blab, Derek Harper, Magic Johnson, John McLendon, Ralph Sampson, Spud Webb and Bill Wennington, as well as minister and Mavericks chaplain Tony Evans.

Camp of the Woods had expanded to 115 acres by 2002. By 2026, it served 15,000 campers each year.

== Affiliation ==
Camp of the Woods is owned by Gospel Volunteers Inc., an interdenominational evangelical mission society. It is independent of any individual denomination. Camp of the Woods is a member of the Christian Camp and Conference Association.

== Programs ==
Camp of the Woods's programs include summer vacation for families, retreats, a girls' camp called Tapawingo, a discipleship program for young adults, online Bible study, mission trips, interns and enrichment for summer staff. Each summer season includes talks by different ministers, Bible teachers and Christian leaders. Since 2014, notable speakers have included Alistair Begg, Tony Evans, Dennis Hollinger, Richard Land, Duane Litfin, Erwin Lutzer, Philip Ryken, Lon Solomon, Lysa TerKeurst, Gregory Alan Thornbury and Ravi Zacharias.

Sports camps during the summer season have included basketball, tennis, football, soccer, floor hockey and volleyball. Instructors for sports camps have included hockey player Troy Loney, football player Karl Swanke, baseball player and coach Mickey Weston.

== Related camps ==
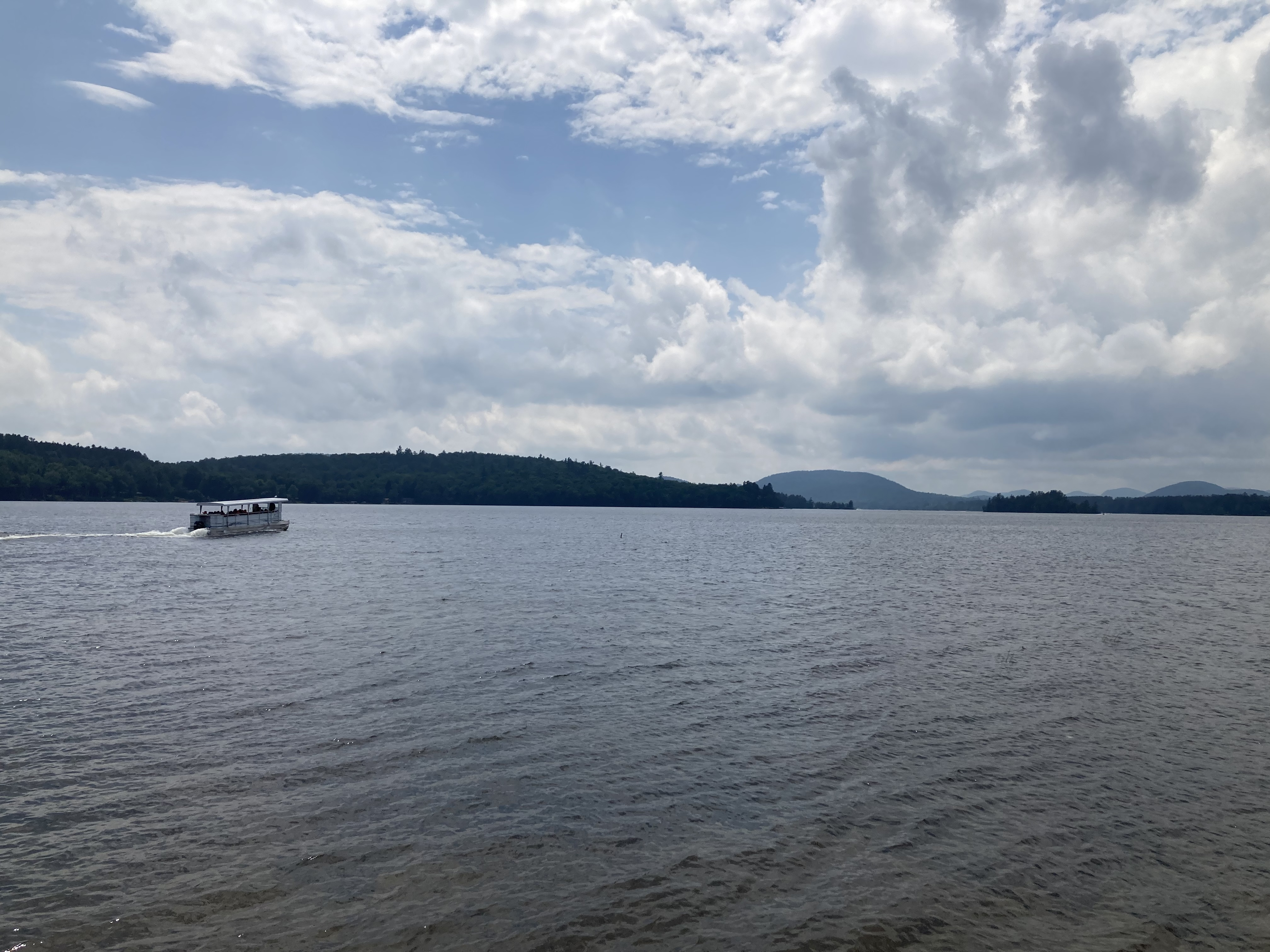
A boat takes campers to Tapawingo on the island in the middle of Lake Pleasant.

In 1929, Tibbitts opened Park of the Palms, a winter camp and conference center in Keystone Heights, Florida, catering to a more elderly clientele. Park of the Palms eventually transitioned into a Christian retirement community.

Camp of the Woods purchased the only island in Lake Pleasant in 1957 to house a girls' camp. Tapawingo opened in 1959 and focused on Bible study. The name Tapawingo was said to mean "place of joy" in the Miami language.
