= Virginia City Church =

Historic church in Virginia, United States

- U.S. National Register of Historic Places
- Virginia Landmarks Register
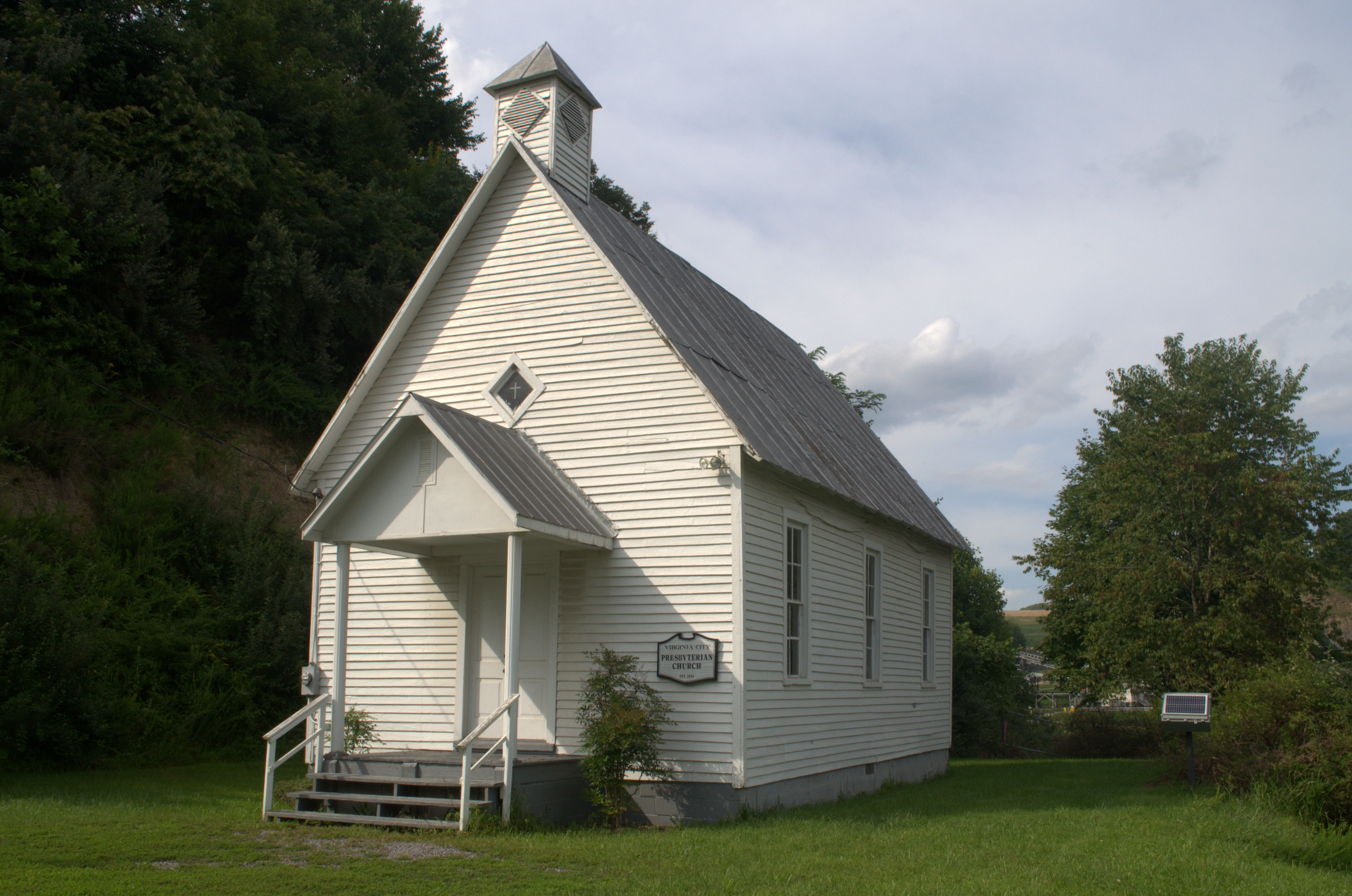

- Location within Virginia Location within the United States
- Location: Bull Run Rd., near St. Paul, Virginia
- Coordinates: 36°55′12″N 82°20′46″W
- Area: less than one acre
- Built: c. 1895
- NRHP reference No.: 05001263
- VLR No.: 097-0192

Significant dates
- Added to NRHP: November 16, 2005
- Designated VLR: September 14, 2005

Virginia City Church is a historic church located on Bull Run Road, near the small town of St. Paul, in Wise County, of southwestern Virginia. It is situated in the Appalachian Mountains / Blue Ridge Mountains chans. It was built about 1895, and is a small, one-room wood-frame vernacular church structure. It has a front gable roof and walls now covered with weatherboard. The rectangular building measures 20 feet by 32 feet.

It was built by the Virginia City coal camp residents on land donated by the Russell Creek Coal Company. The building also served the surrounding local community as its first public schoolhouse.

It was added to and listed on the National Register of Historic Places (maintained by the National Park Service of the United States Department of the Interior) in 2005.
