= Lake Pleasant (hamlet), New York =

Lake Pleasant, New York
- Hamlet
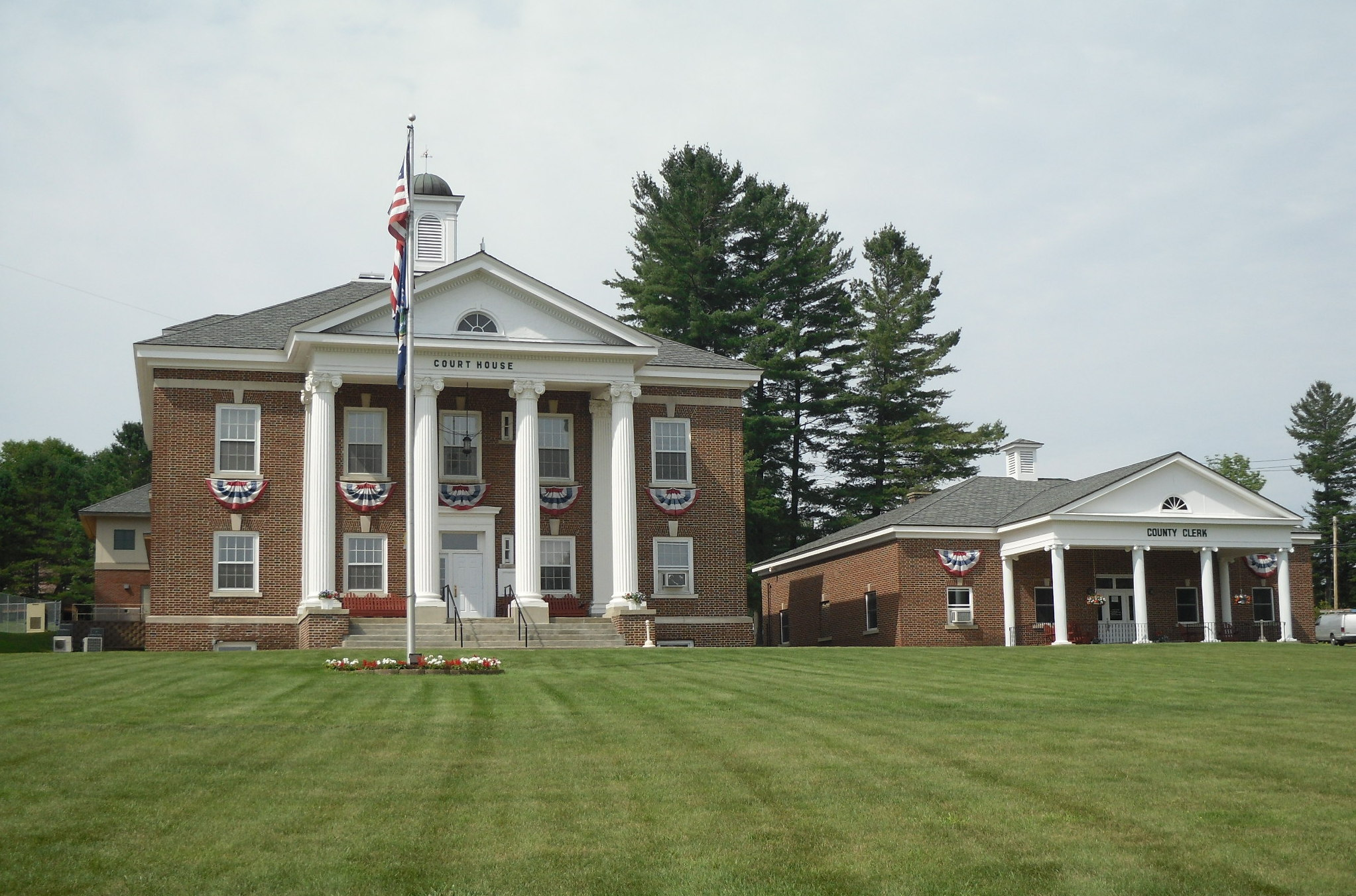
- Hamilton County Courthouse and Clerk's Office

- Location within New York Location within the United States
- Coordinates: 43°28′15″N 74°24′46″W
- Country: United States
- State: New York
- County: Hamilton
- Town: Lake Pleasant
- Elevation: 1,785 ft (544 m)
- Time zone: UTC-5 (Eastern (EST))
  - Summer (DST): UTC-4 (EDT)
- ZIP code: 12108
- Area codes: 518 & 838
- GNIS feature ID: 954932

Lake Pleasant is a hamlet in the town of Lake Pleasant in Hamilton County, New York, United States. It is the county seat of Hamilton County and includes the Hamilton County Courthouse Complex. The name is derived from a water body named Lake Pleasant near the community.

Historically, Lake Pleasant was also known as "Sageville", after Hezekiah Sage, who built a hotel and attempted to rename the community after himself.

The government offices are primarily located adjacent to New York State Route 8.

Lake Pleasant hamlet is nestled between the southeast corner of Sacandaga Lake and the southwestern corner of Lake Pleasant.
