= Makomis Mountain =

Mountain in New York, United States

- Location within New York Adirondack Park Location within the United States

Highest point
- Elevation: 1,631 feet (497 m)
- Coordinates: 44°05′17″N 73°39′50″W

Geography
- Location: W of Witherbee, Essex County, New York, U.S.
- Topo map: USGS Underwood

Makomis Mountain is a 1,631-foot-tall (497 m) mountain located in Adirondack Mountains of New York, the United States. It is located west of the hamlet of Witherbee in Essex County. In 1916, a 40-foot-tall (12 m) steel fire lookout tower was built on the mountain. Due to increased use in aerial fire lookout operations, the tower ceased fire lookout operations at the end of the 1970 season, and was later removed.

== History ==
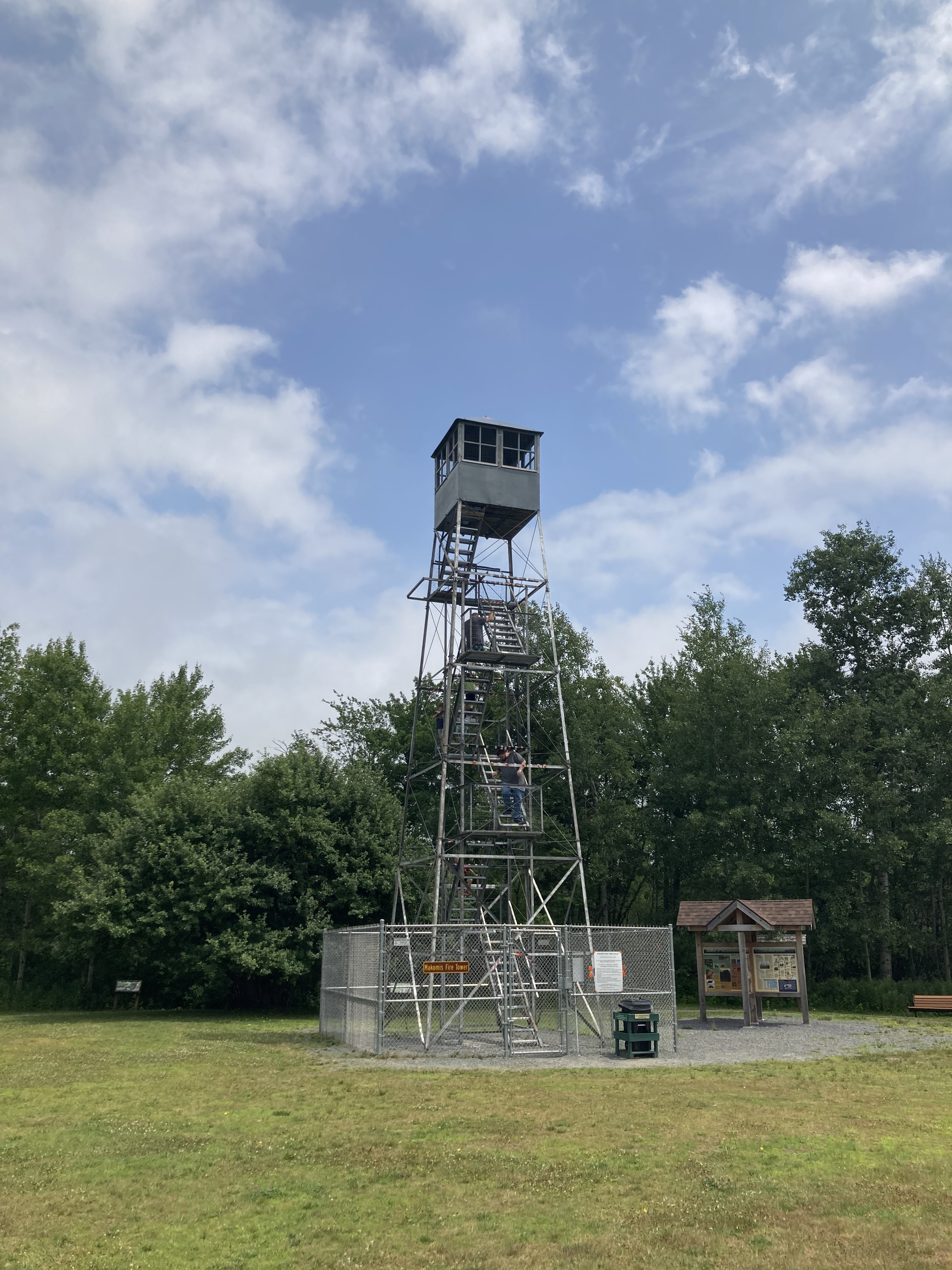
Erected in 1916 and removed from Makomis Mountain in 1970, the reassembled tower pictured here is an attraction in Sacandaga Park in Speculator, New York.

The first fire lookout structure on the mountain was an enclosed wood tower that was taken over by the Conservation Commission in September 1911. In 1916, the wood structure was replaced with a 40-foot-tall (12 m) Aermotor LL25 tower. The tower was of a lighter weight than the 1917 design and had no stairs but only a ladder up the exterior to get to the top. In 1918 or 1919, wooden steps were added within the structure to ease access to the top of the tower. The Aermotor company later developed a self-supporting staircase for installation in the towers purchased in 1916. This staircase was a tower within a tower and was bolted to the original tower. This self-supporting staircase was installed in 1933 to replace the wooden stairs that were previously installed. Due to increased use in aerial fire lookout operations, the tower ceased fire lookout operations at the end of the 1970 season, and was later removed. In 2019, the fire tower parts was purchased by Mike Vilegi who later restored the tower.
