= Fawn Lake (Lake Pleasant, Hamilton County, New York) =

- Location within New York Fawn Lake (the United States)
- Location: Hamilton County, New York, United States
- Coordinates: 43°29′21″N 74°27′17″W
- Type: Lake
- Basin countries: United States
- Surface area: 286 acres (1.16 km^{2})
- Max. depth: 62 feet (19 m)
- Shore length^{1}: 3.9 miles (6.3 km)
- Surface elevation: 1,699 feet (518 m)
- Settlements: Lake Pleasant, New York
- ^{1} Shore length is not a well-defined measure.

Fawn Lake is located in Hamilton County, New York west of Lake Pleasant. Fish species present in the lake are lake trout, white sucker, black bullhead, smallmouth bass, yellow perch, and pickerel. There is trail access on the southwest shore from Sacandaga Lake. No fishing is allowed between 10/16 and 3/31.
