= St. Paul, Virginia =

St. Paul
- Town
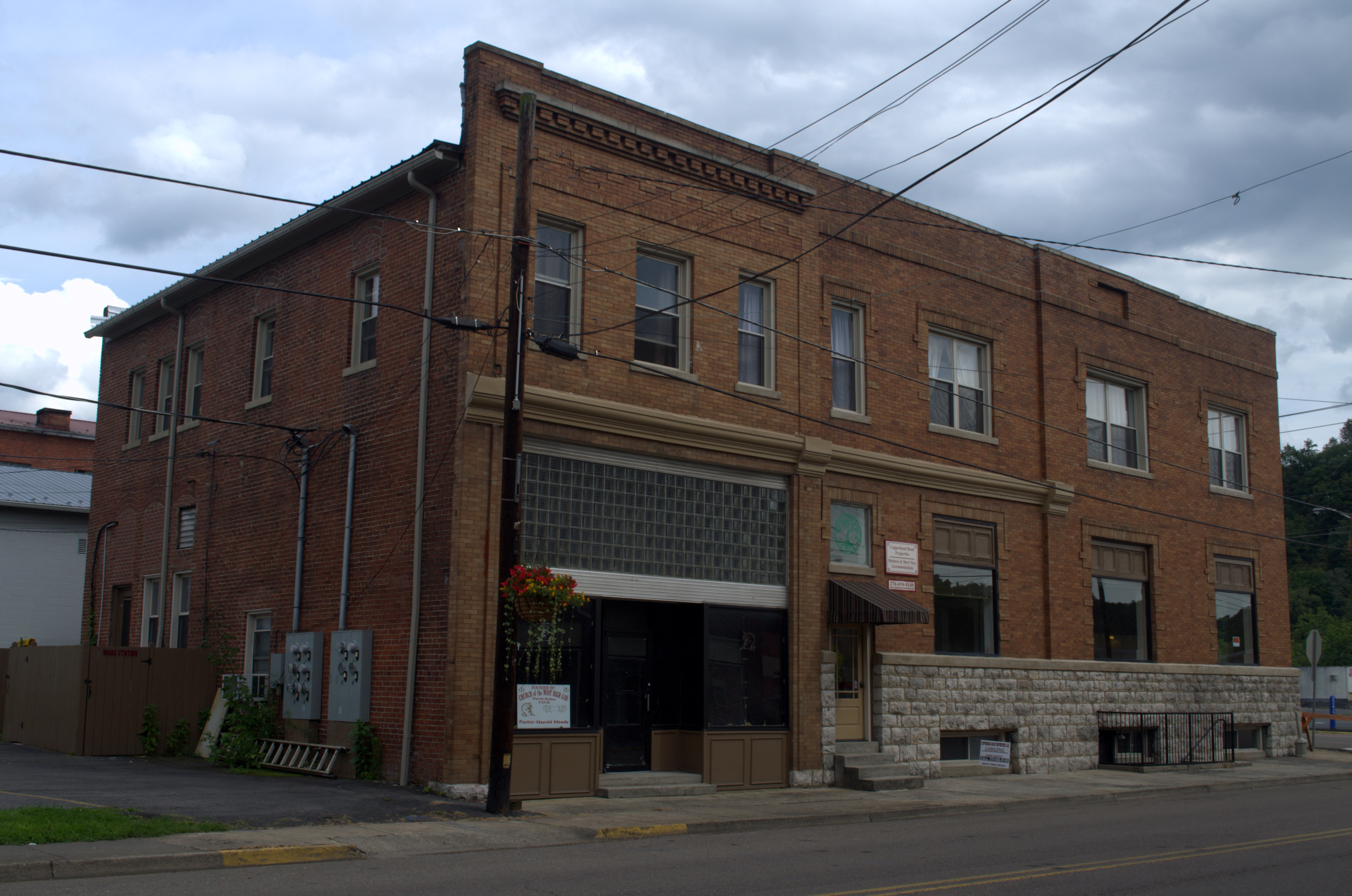
- St. Paul National Bank building

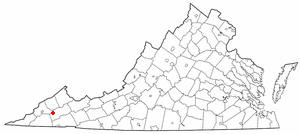
- Location of St. Paul, Virginia
- Coordinates: 36°54′20″N 82°18′37″W
- Country: United States
- State: Virginia
- Counties: Wise, Russell

Area
  - Total: 1.42 sq mi (3.69 km^{2})
  - Land: 1.38 sq mi (3.58 km^{2})
  - Water: 0.042 sq mi (0.11 km^{2})
- Elevation: 1,503 ft (458 m)

Population (2020)
  - Total: 866
  - Estimate (2019): 851
  - Density: 616.0/sq mi (237.85/km^{2})
- Time zone: UTC−5 (Eastern (EST))
  - Summer (DST): UTC−4 (EDT)
- FIPS code: 51-69936
- GNIS feature ID: 1473855
- Website: https://www.stpaulva.org/

St. Paul is a town in Russell and Wise counties in the U.S. state of Virginia. As of the 2020 census, St. Paul had a population of 866. Virginia City Hybrid Energy Center, which powers 150,000 homes, is located in St. Paul.

== History ==
St. Paul, Virginia is a town located in the Appalachian Mountains along the Clinch River. It began as a French Huguenot settlement overlooking the river in 1791, during the Cherokee-American wars. Since the creation of Wise County in 1858, it has been located partially in Wise and partly in the older Russell County. It was formerly incorporated as a town in 1911. The St. Paul Historic District and Virginia City Church are listed on the National Register of Historic Places. Since the 1990s, the Nature Conservancy has worked to preserve the great biodiversity in and along the Clinch River.

In 2021, Virginia governor Ralph Northam dedicated Clinch River State Park, still in development but which was designed as Virginia's first blueway state park, with multiple river multiple access points over 135 miles (217 km) of the Clinch River. Early sections include Sugar Hill (2 miles of river access and 400 acres of land including the remains of the Huguenot settlement), and the Artrip Bent Unit (232 undeveloped acres in Russell county).

St. Paul has several annual historical celebrations. One is the Santa Train. The Santa Train travels from Eastern Kentucky and Southwest Virginia, ending in Kingsport, Tennessee. The Santa Train makes 14 stops along the way while Santa Claus throws out gifts to children.

== Geography ==
According to the United States Census Bureau, the town has a total area of 1.0 square mile (2.6 km^{2}), of which 1.0 square mile (2.5 km^{2}) is land and 0.04 square mile (0.1 km^{2}) (3.92%) is water.

== Demographics ==
Historical population
Census	Pop.	Note	%±
1920	574		—
1930	716		24.7%
1940	746		4.2%
1950	1,014		35.9%
1960	1,156		14.0%
1970	948		−18.0%
1980	973		2.6%
1990	1,007		3.5%
2000	1,000		−0.7%
2010	970		−3.0%
2020	866		−10.7%
U.S. Decennial Census

As of the census of 2000, there were 1,000 people, 464 households, and 302 families living in the town. The population density was 1,023.2 people per square mile (394.0/km^{2}). There were 496 housing units at an average density of 507.5 per square mile (195.4/km^{2}). The racial makeup of the town was 95.70% White, 1.80% African American, 0.60% Native American, 0.50% Asian, 0.10% from other races, and 1.30% from two or more races. Hispanic or Latino of any race were 0.50% of the population.

There were 464 households, out of which 28.7% had children under the age of 18 living with them, 48.5% were married couples living together, 12.3% had a female householder with no husband present, and 34.9% were non-families. 33.4% of all households were made up of individuals, and 17.7% had someone living alone who was 65 years of age or older. The average household size was 2.16 and the average family size was 2.72.

In the town, the population was spread out, with 21.6% under the age of 18, 9.7% from 18 to 24, 24.1% from 25 to 44, 25.0% from 45 to 64, and 19.6% who were 65 years of age or older. The median age was 42 years. For every 100 females, there were 82.8 males. For every 100 females aged 18 and over, there were 81.1 males.

The median income for a household in the town was $24,833, and the median income for a family was $39,125. Males had a median income of $31,563 versus $25,313 for females. The per capita income for the town was $17,735. About 15.1% of families and 19.3% of the population were below the poverty line, including 27.4% of those under age 18 and 15.2% of those age 65 or over.

== Education ==
St. Paul is home to one public school, St. Paul Elementary School. The school features unique programs such as the Wetlands Estonoa Project.

== Attractions ==
=== Natural and outdoor recreation ===
- Clinch River
- Matthews Park
- Oxbow Lake
- Sugar Hill Loop Trail
- Wetlands Estonoa and the Wetlands Estonoa Project
- Spearhead Trail
- Ridge Runner Campground

=== Historical ===
- Railroad Museum

=== Festivals and celebrations ===
- Clinch River Days
- Fourth of July Celebration

== Media ==
St. Paul is home to an online newspaper, the Clinch Valley Times. WHNQ (AM) previously broadcast from St. Paul.

== Notable person ==
Steven Jason Williams, better known by his alias Boogie2988, an American YouTube personality born in Abingdon, Virginia. He was raised in St. Paul.
