= Eleanor Macomber =

Eleanor Macomber (February 22, 1801 – April 16, 1840) was an American missionary and teacher who founded a Protestant school and church among the Karen. In 1830, she was sent by the American missionary board of the Baptist church as a teacher among the Ojibwe at Sault Ste. Marie, Michigan. After four years' service her health failed. After her health improved, she connected herself with the Karen mission in 1836, in Burma. She then settled at Dong-Yahn, an out-station located about 35 miles (56 km) from Mawlamyine. With the help of Karen evangelistic assistants, she labored among the adjoining Karen groups.

With the aid of two or three native assistants, she maintained public worship on the Sabbath, and morning and evening prayers at her own dwelling; and also opened a school, which soon numbered ten or twelve pupils. Before the close of the first dry season, she had the happiness of seeing twelve Karens baptized and formed into a Christian church. She spent the period of the rains from May to September at Maulmain, and on her return to the jungle, found the church and the schools prospering under the charge of the native preachers. The little church was soon committed to the care of Rev. Mr. Edward A. Stevens, of the Theological School, and was occasionally visited by other missionaries from Maulmain. Amidst the prejudices and the occasional persecution of the priests and the votaries of Buddhism, the gospel continued to spread among the people; and Dong-yahn, by the instrumentality of Macomber, soon became the seat of a flourishing station, and the centre of religious knowledge to a wide region of Karens. Her influence upon other women was considered to be extraordinary, and its results were visible in numerous dwellings among the villages of the jungle. Her death was the result of a jungle fever that she contracted while she was on a mission to a distant tribe.

== Early life ==
Eleanor Macomber was born at Lake Pleasant, New York, February 22, 1801. Here, her childhood and youth were passed until she removed to Albany, New York.

== Career ==
=== Ojibwe in Michigan ===
She was sent out by the American missionary board of the Baptist church in 1830, to labor among the Ojibwe in Michigan. She acquired the language, and rendered herself useful until obliged to leave on account of her health.

=== Pwo Karens in Burma ===
In 1836, she was sent to Mawlamyine, Burma, as a missionary, arriving in December of that year. (Note: According to Wayland (1853), Macomber arrived in February 1836.) Soon after her arrival, she was appointed to labor among the Pwo Karens, a people whose language had not been acquired by any foreigner, though a beginning had been made at Tavoy, and in the region of the Zwaigaben hills, where no missionary labor had been performed. After visiting Tavoy, and acquiring the rudiments of the language, she left for the wilderness assigned her, about 25 miles (40 km) distant from the habitation of any Caucasian person; and there, after parting in tears with the missionary who had accompanied her, she sat down in the hut of a chief, who gave her reluctant admission. He was a hard-headed, notorious drunkard. Though able to say but little, and that in a very imperfect manner, she immediately began to communicate the gospel to the people around her. It was not long before an elderly person in the neighborhood was inspired by her instructions; then the wife of the chief; and then, to the astonishment of all, the chief himself became a devoted Christian. Nearly all their children, a large family, most of them grown up, sooner or later followed their parents into becoming Christians.

A violent persecution ensued. Most of the population forbade her entering their houses. Mobs of people surrounded her dwelling by night, yelling and throwing stones. Several times, her house was set on fire, and the house of her principal assistant was burned down. But she persisted in her teaching until the persecution subsided. The growing church was placed under the pastoral supervision of some of the missionaries. Adoniram Judson organized it in March, 1837; and one and another of the brethren subsequently took over the pastoral care.

On the sabbath, the people were drawn together to hear her; and during the week, her house was open for morning and evening prayers. By her perseverance, she soon established a small school, and in less than a year, a church numbering more than twenty persons was formed, and placed under the care of the Rev. Mr. Stephens. She was unusual for being a lone woman working among a foreign people, with no husband, father, or brother, and establishing public worship, opening her house for prayer, and developing schools.

== Death ==
Besides her labors at Dong-yan, Macomber made occasional tours about the country in search of Karens of the Pwo tribe. Her last tour was up the Houng-ta-ran, above 100 miles (160 km). On her return, it soon became evident that she had developed symptoms of jungle fever. She at once gave up all hope of recovering as she felt that her work was done. The last afternoon, she suffered severely. Macomber died April 16, 1840, of jungle fever, at Mawlamyine, where she had been carried for the purpose of obtaining medical aid. She was buried next to Miss Cummings, who was also a missionary. Macomber's missionary records are held in the Missionary Research Library Archives of Burke Library, Union Theological Seminary, in New York City.
