= Mason Lake (New York) =

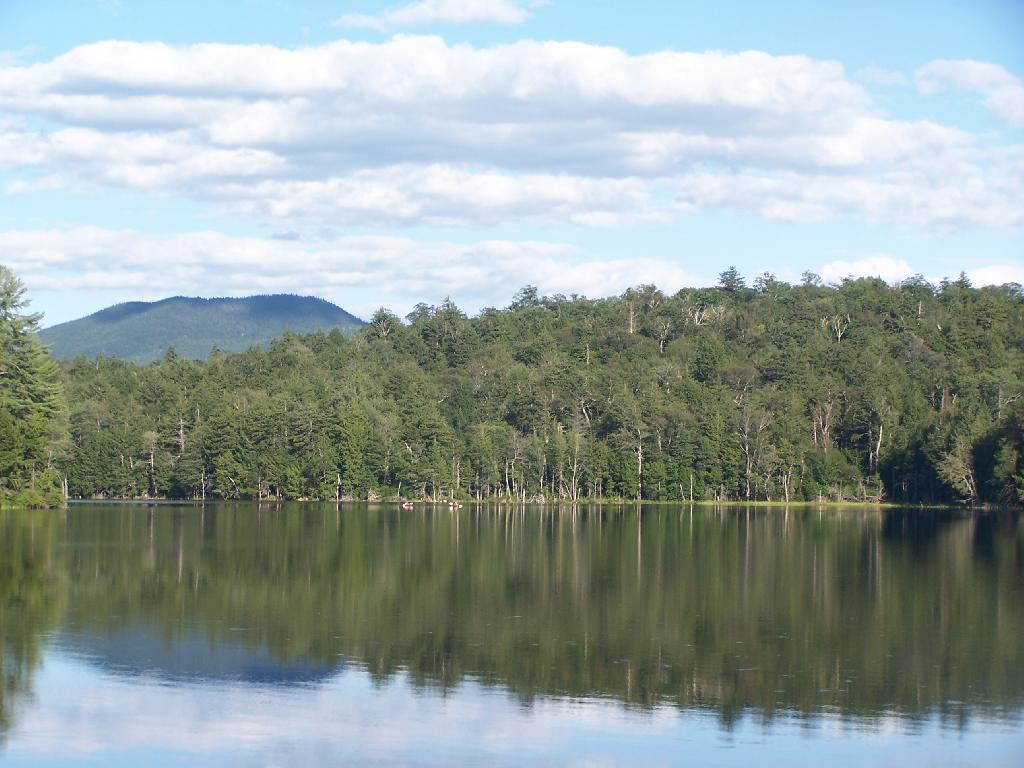
- Mason Lake in 2016

- Location within New York Mason Lake (the United States)
- Location: Hamilton County, New York, United States
- Coordinates: 43°35′48″N 74°25′18″W
- Type: Lake
- Primary outflows: Mason Lake Outlet
- Basin countries: United States
- Surface area: 104 acres (0.42 km^{2})
- Max. depth: 18 feet (5.5 m)
- Shore length^{1}: 2.8 miles (4.5 km)
- Surface elevation: 1,798 feet (548 m)
- Settlements: Perkins Clearing, New York
- ^{1} Shore length is not a well-defined measure.

Mason Lake is located north of Perkins Clearing, New York. Fish species present in the lake are brook trout, black bullhead, and yellow perch. There is carry down access off Jessup River Road on the west shore.
