= Oxbow Archeological District =

Archaeological site in Michigan, United States

- U.S. National Register of Historic Places
- Location within Michigan Location within the United States
- Location: Chippewa Nature Center, Midland, Michigan
- Coordinates: 43°36′15″N 84°16′42″W
- Area: 120 acres (49 ha)
- NRHP reference No.: 73002156
- Added to NRHP: June 19, 1973

The Oxbow Archeological District, also known as the Chippewa Nature Center Site, is a set of archaeological sites located on the grounds of the Chippewa Nature Center (400 S. Badour Rd.) near Midland, Michigan. It was listed on the National Register of Historic Places in 1973. The district contains single and multicomponent sites, which were occupied during the Middle and Late Archaic, Late Woodland, and Historic periods.

The district was the site of a battle between two tribes: the Ojibwe and the Sauk. It was first unearthed in the 1930s.

Archaeological sites at the Chippewa Nature Center include:

- Naugle Site (20MD30): A site containing early Late Woodland and Late Archaic components, located near the Visitor Center. It was first excavated in the early 1970s.
- Sumac Bluff site (20MD25): A prehistoric Archaic and Woodland site located on the bank of the Chippewa River.
- Sias East site (20MD263): A site located along the north side of the Chippewa river. This site contains at least two dated occupations: a Middle Woodland occupation in the fourth century A.D. and a late prehistoric occupation in the fifteenth century A.D. Other occupations are possible.
- Cater Site (20MD36): A site on the south side of the Chippewa River discovered in the early 1970. It contains artifacts from three eras of occupation: prehistoric occupation, Chippewa occupation (likely about 1800-1830), and settler European occupation dating to about 1840.
- Site 20MD534: An early nineteenth century Chippewa habitation site, located about 150 meters from the Cater site. This site was discovered in 1999.
- Ponton Site: Located across the river from the Cater Site, this was discovered in 1995, and incorporated into the Chippewa Nature Center in 2001. It is another historical European settler site, dating from about 1830.
