= Speculator, New York =

- Village
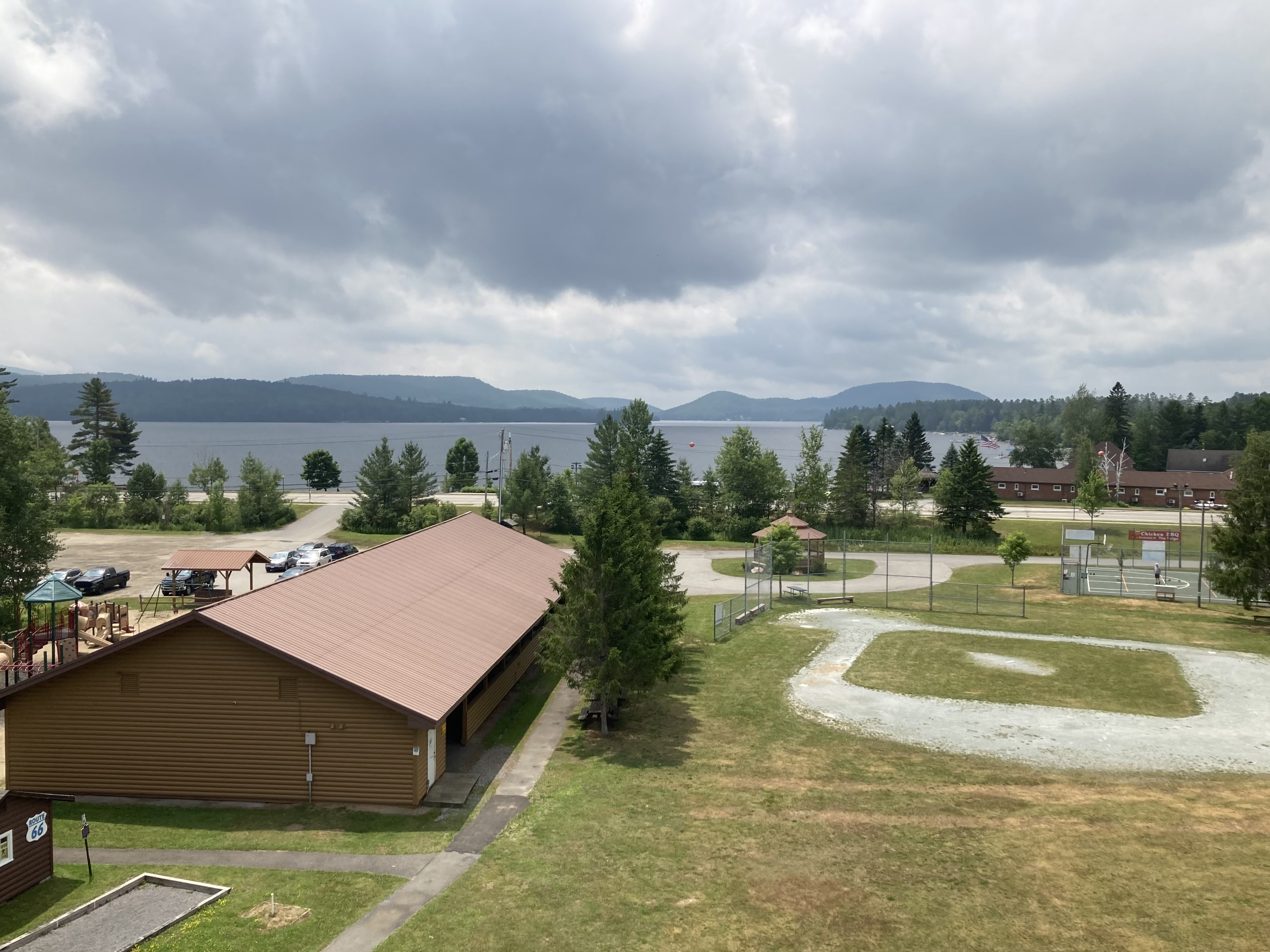
- A view of Lake Pleasant and the village of Speculator’s Sacandaga Park from the former Makomis Mountain fire tower installed there.

- Seal

- Location in Hamilton County and the state of New York
- Coordinates: 43°31′37″N 74°21′47″W
- Country: United States
- State: New York
- County: Hamilton
- Town: Lake Pleasant
- Incorporated: 1925

Government
  - Mayor: Jeanette Barrett

Area
  - Total: 47.20 sq mi (122.26 km^{2})
  - Land: 44.61 sq mi (115.54 km^{2})
  - Water: 2.59 sq mi (6.72 km^{2}) 5.50%
- Elevation: 1,740 ft (530 m)

Population (2020)
  - Total: 406
  - Density: 9.1/sq mi (3.51/km^{2})
- Time zone: UTC-5 (Eastern (EST))
  - Summer (DST): UTC-4 (EDT)
- ZIP codes: 12164
- Area code: 518
- FIPS code: 36-70123
- GNIS feature ID: 0965973
- Website: www.villageofspeculator.com

Speculator is a village in Hamilton County, New York, United States. The population was 406 at the 2020 census. The 2,966-foot (904 m) Speculator Mountain rises just south of the village.

Speculator is the only incorporated village within Hamilton County and is within the town of Lake Pleasant. The village includes the northeastern end of a lake, also called Lake Pleasant. The local inhabitants sometimes refer to the village as the "Four Corners", referring to the intersection of NYS Route 8 and NYS Route 30 in the middle of the business district.

Speculator is within the Adirondack Park.

== History ==
=== Native Americans ===
Archeological evidence of Native Americans has been found in arrowheads and spearheads near the shores of Lake Pleasant. Many historians believe Speculator was the hunting and fishing grounds of both Mohawk and Algonquin tribes. These Native Americans would only travel to the Adirondack Mountains to hunt during the warm months, while their villages were located in the Mohawk and Hudson Valley regions. There was a Mohawk, who named himself Captain Gill, who lived in a wigwam at the outlet of Lake Pleasant, during the end of the eighteenth century and the beginning of the nineteenth century. He had a wife named Molly, who had a daughter named Molly Jr., although Capt. Gill didn't claim the daughter as his own. Old Capt. Gill was a trail guide for the first settlers. He would show them places to hunt and fish. Capt. Gill was most famous for his storytelling of the Iroquois Nation, such as the Flying Head.

=== Newton's Corners ===
The small settlement at the outlet of Lake Pleasant was part of the town of Lake Pleasant. In 1864, Joel Newton built a small store and hotel in the center of town and secured a post office with the name "Newton's Corners". At that time, Page Hill and Page Street were included in Newton's Corners. Joel Newton's structure burned in 1870, and in 1872 the Newton's Corners post office was reopened in Satterlee's store. Henry Dunning built a hotel in 1882, on the former site of Newton's hotel and the post office had moved there, and in 1896, the community received a new name, "Speculator", after the mountain seen across the lake.

=== Becoming Speculator ===
In 1892, a few ambitious and industrious business leaders felt they needed to update and modernize their facilities. Speculator was a "booming Mecca" for tourists. With the support of the voters in 1925, the village of Speculator was incorporated with a mayor and two trustees, which later changed to four trustees. The village of Speculator purchased a small water system of Dexter Slack and expanded it. The village had a generating plant and waterwheel installed at Christine Falls, and by 1926 they had electricity.

=== Age of tourism ===
Growth escalated in the Victorian era between the mid-1800s and the early 1900s. Entire families spent their summers enjoying the mountain hospitality and fresh air. Several more hotels were built to accommodate them, and eventually more stores, homes and several cottages were built. Around the 1850s, city sportsmen began to come to the Adirondack Mountains to hunt, fish, and enjoy expeditions into the deep woods. They hired local men to be guides, who provided food and crude lean-tos for shelter. Hunting shanties were later widely used. With these sportsmen came their whole families to use the many hotels and boardinghouses in Lake Pleasant and Speculator. Private summer camps and cottages were built and along came the established family and children camps. Camps such as Camp of the Woods, Camp Setag for girls, Kamp Kun-ju-muk for boys, the YMCA Camp Agaming, and Deerfoot Lodge for boys were established around the shores of local lakes. After World War I, famous athletes came to practice in the isolated communities, such as Gene Tunney, Max Schmeling, and Max Baer, who arrived to train for their heavyweight championship fights at various times.

=== Age of lumbering ===
In the beginning, small sawmills provided lumber for local use. After the Civil War, large lumber companies formed and mills were built near the Glens Falls area. At first logging was prevalent along the upper Hudson River which was used to float the logs to the mills. Later, logging operations moved into Lake Pleasant, and the Sacandaga River, the outlet of Lake Pleasant, was used to float logs to Glens Falls as the state of New York designated rivers as public highways for moving logs to the larger companies. Many local farmers found winter employment as lumberjacks, and also supplied the companies with potatoes, meat, animal feed and dairy products. The lumber companies bought large parcels of land for their timber. Some of this land was later abandoned and became state land. This was the beginning of the Adirondack Park as designated in 1892.

== Geography ==
According to the United States Census Bureau, the village has a total area of 47.2 square miles (122 km^{2}), of which 44.7 square miles (116 km^{2}) are land and 2.6 square miles (6.7 km^{2}), or 5.46%, are water.

Unusually, the village has an exclave in the northern portion of its containing town (Lake Pleasant). The exclave is completely inaccessible by road and it is not clear why it exists. The closest roadway to the exclave is NY 28.

Speculator Mountain, with an altitude of 2,966 feet (904 m), is south of the village.

Lake Pleasant and Sacandaga Lake are west of the village. The Sacandaga River assumes its riverine nature from the outflow of Lake Pleasant at Speculator, although much of the water flows from Sacandaga Lake through the Sacandaga Lake Outlet into Lake Pleasant underneath NY-8 southwest of the village.

NY 8 and NY 30 intersect and combine in the village.

The entire village is located within the Lake Pleasant Central School District.

== Demographics ==
Historical population
Census	Pop.	Note	%±
1930	261		—
1940	278		6.5%
1950	370		33.1%
1960	372		0.5%
1970	390		4.8%
1980	408		4.6%
1990	400		−2.0%
2000	348		−13.0%
2010	324		−6.9%
2020	406		25.3%
U.S. Decennial Census

As of the census of 2000, there were 348 people, 163 households, and 94 families residing in the village. The population density was 7.8 inhabitants per square mile (3.0/km^{2}). There were 484 housing units at an average density of 10.8 per square mile (4.2/km^{2}). The racial makeup of the village was 96.26% White, 1.72% African American, 0.29% Native American, 0.57% Asian, 1.15% from other races. Hispanic or Latino of any race were 1.72% of the population.

There were 163 households, out of which 17.2% had children under the age of 18 living with them, 49.1% were married couples living together, 4.9% had a female householder with no husband present, and 42.3% were non-families. 39.3% of all households were made up of individuals, and 16.0% had someone living alone who was 65 years of age or older. The average household size was 2.00 and the average family size was 2.61.

In the village, the population was spread out, with 14.7% under the age of 18, 6.0% from 18 to 24, 25.0% from 25 to 44, 28.2% from 45 to 64, and 26.1% who were 65 years of age or older. The median age was 48 years. For every 100 females, there were 112.2 males. For every 100 females age 18 and over, there were 110.6 males.

The median income for a household in the village was $33,393, and the median income for a family was $43,750. Males had a median income of $33,750 versus $20,417 for females. The per capita income for the village was $25,089. About 4.3% of families and 4.3% of the population were below the poverty line, including 7.7% of those under age 18 and none of those age 65 or over.

== Tourism ==
Speculator calls itself the "All Season Vacationland". A public beach is located in the village on the north lake shore. Free parking is available across the street from the beach. There is a baseball field, basketball court and large pavilion next to the parking lot. There is also a nature walk behind the pavilion.

Speculator Mountain, for which the village was named, lies just south of the village on Gilmantown Road, and is visible from most of the village. Oak Mountain is the location of the Oak Mountain Ski Center located just north of the four corners.

== Landmarks ==
The Grace Methodist Church Complex was added to the National Register of Historic Places in 2015.

== Education ==
It is in the Lake Pleasant Central School District.

== Bibliography ==
- Lake Pleasant and Speculator in the Adirondacks by Anne Weaver and Beverly Hoffman. Arcadia Publishing, 2010. www.arcadiapublishing.com
