= Oxbow Lake (New York) =

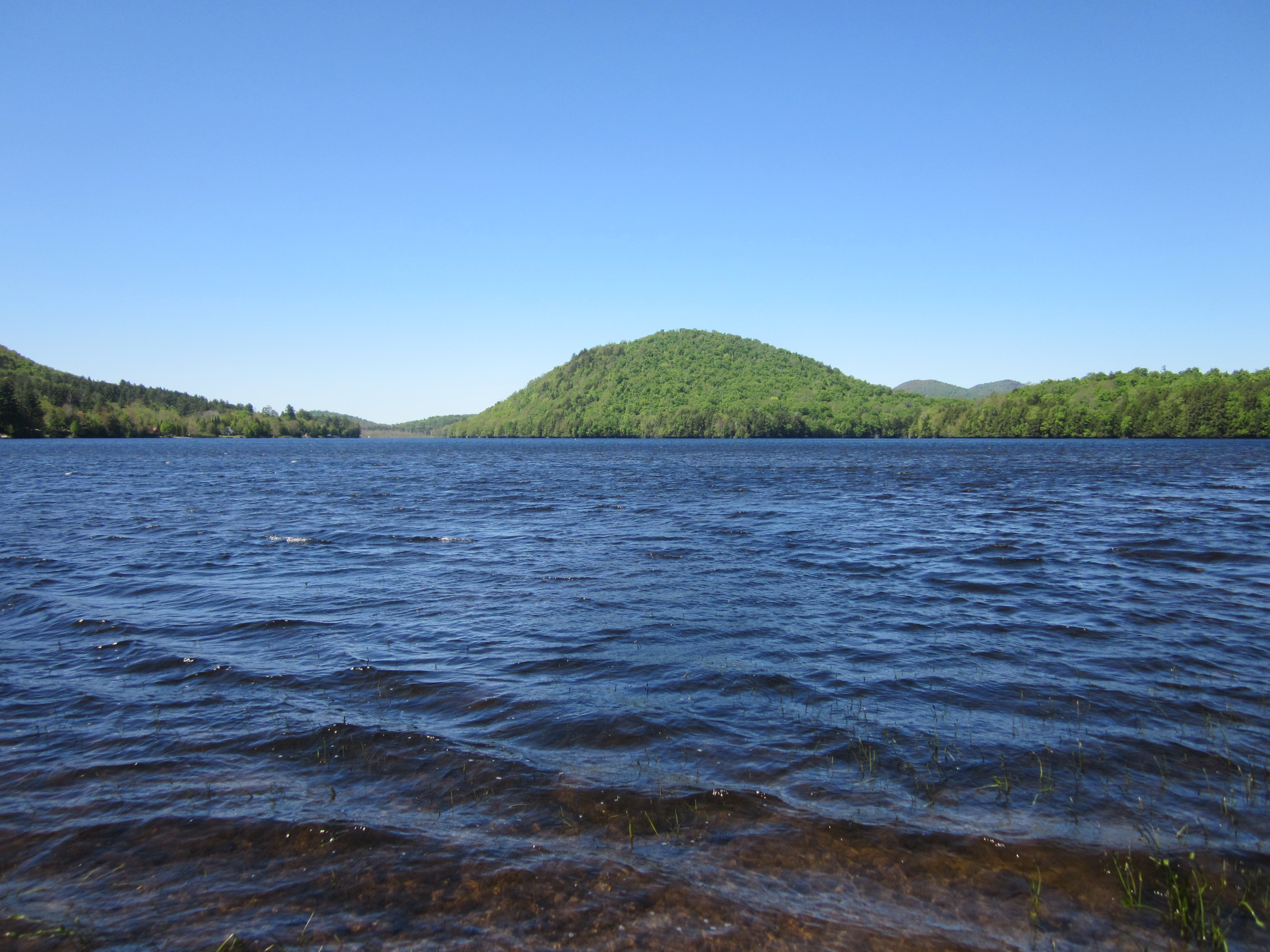
- Northeast end of Oxbow Lake looking southwest. Oxbow Mountain (elev. 695 m [2280 ft]) is in the center.

- Location within New York Oxbow Lake (the United States)
- Location: Hamilton County, New York
- Coordinates: 43°26′33″N 74°28′54″W
- Type: Lake
- Part of: Sacandaga River Basin
- Primary inflows: Three (3) unnamed tributaries including the discharge from Airdwood Lake
- Primary outflows: Unnamed outlet to Piseco Lake
- Basin countries: United States
- Max. length: 1.9 miles (3.1 km)
- Max. width: 0.58 miles (0.93 km)
- Surface area: 312 acres (1.26 km^{2})
- Max. depth: 15 feet (4.6 m)
- Shore length^{1}: 4.3 miles (6.9 km)
- Surface elevation: 1,706 feet (520 m)
- References: [1.], [2.]
- ^{1} Shore length is not a well-defined measure.

Oxbow Lake is a 312-acre (1.26 km^{2}) naturally occurring lake located in the towns of Lake Pleasant and Arietta in Hamilton County, New York within the Adirondack Park. The lake is nearly two miles-long and is oriented in a northeast to southwest direction, with the widest part being at the northeast end, at nearly 0.6 miles (0.97 km) wide. The lake has 4.3 miles (6.9 km) of shoreline and no islands. NY Route 8 is located along the southeast shoreline, Oxbow Road crosses the lake inlet on the northeastern end, and Old Piseco Road (County Rt. 24) crosses the lake outlet on the southwestern end.

The southeastern shoreline of the lake is lined with seasonal and some year-round residences. The remainder of the lake shore is generally undeveloped given the existence of extensive wetlands along the northeastern and southwestern ends and the fact that the entire northwestern shoreline (2.1 miles (3.4 km)) is located within the Jessup River Wild Forest.

The lake is a warm-water fishery given its relatively shallow depth. It is recognized as being a top fishing water for both Largemouth Bass and Pickerel.
