= Sacandaga Lake =

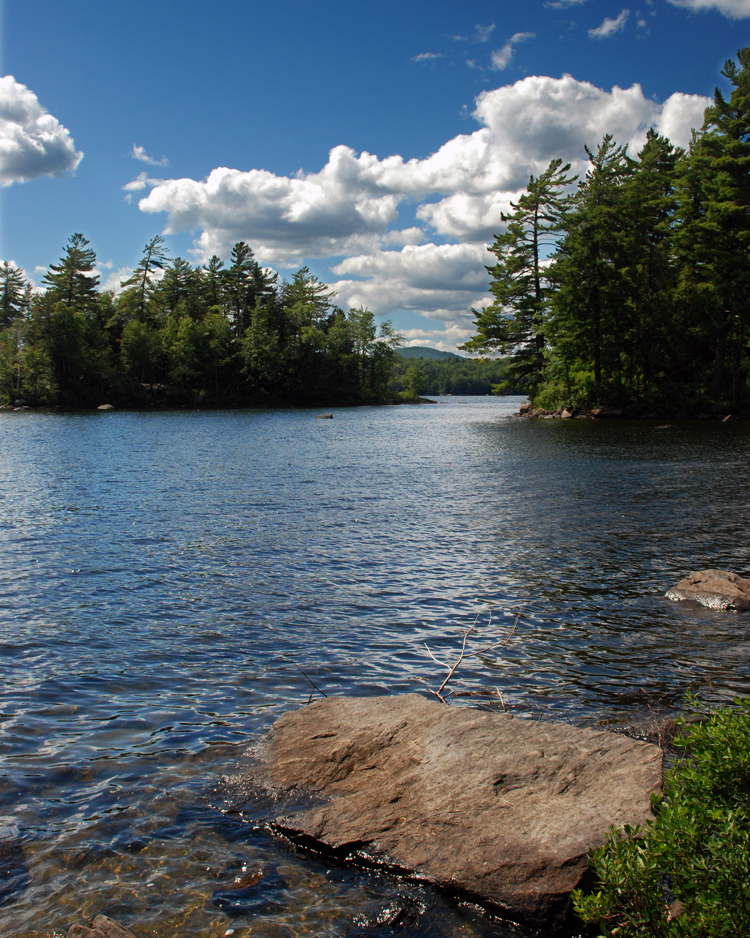
- Sacandaga Lake from Moffitt Beach

- Location within New York Sacandaga Lake (the United States)
- Location: Hamilton County, New York, United States
- Coordinates: 43°29′11″N 74°25′24″W, 43°30′07″N 74°25′42″W
- Type: Lake
- Primary inflows: Hatchery Brook, Burnt Place Brook, Echo Lake
- Primary outflows: Sacandaga Lake Outlet
- Basin countries: United States
- Surface area: 1,608 acres (6.51 km^{2})
- Average depth: 28 feet (8.5 m)
- Max. depth: 60 feet (18 m)
- Shore length^{1}: 13.2 miles (21.2 km)
- Surface elevation: 1,526 feet (465 m)
- Settlements: Speculator, New York
- ^{1} Shore length is not a well-defined measure.

Sacandaga Lake (sa-kuhn-DAH-ga) is located in the Town of Lake Pleasant in Hamilton County, New York approximately 2 miles (3.2 km) west of Speculator. The outlet is a channel that leads to Lake Pleasant, which is the source of the Sacandaga River.

The lake covers an area of 1,608 acres (651 ha), entirely within the boundaries of New York's Adirondack Park, a mean depth of 28 feet (8.5 m), and a maximum depth greater than 50 feet (15 m). It lies at an altitude of 1,725 feet (526 m).

Moffitt Beach State Campground is a popular camping site on the lake.

== Fishing ==
Fish species present in the lake are brown trout, brook trout, smallmouth bass, walleye, pickerel, and brown bullhead. There is a state owned public access with parking for 30 trucks and trailers.
