= Oxbow Park and Zollman Zoo =

- Interactive map of Oxbow Park and Zollman Zoo
- 44.0841551°N 92.6504302°W
- Location: Byron, Minnesota, United States
- No. of species: over 30
- Website: Official website

Oxbow Park and Zollman Zoo are a campground and zoo located in Olmsted County, Minnesota, United States, north of the city of Byron, and about 4.5 miles (7.2 km) west of Rochester. It houses over 30 species of animals, most of which have injuries that would prevent them from surviving in the wild. All of the animals are native to Minnesota. The zoo is named after Dr. Paul E. Zollman. The most popular animals include a wolf, bald eagle, white-tailed deer, coyotes, bobcat, river otters, bison and cougar. Oxbow Park is open most of the year, as is Zollman Zoo, with a majority of the animals being visible year round.

== Gallery ==
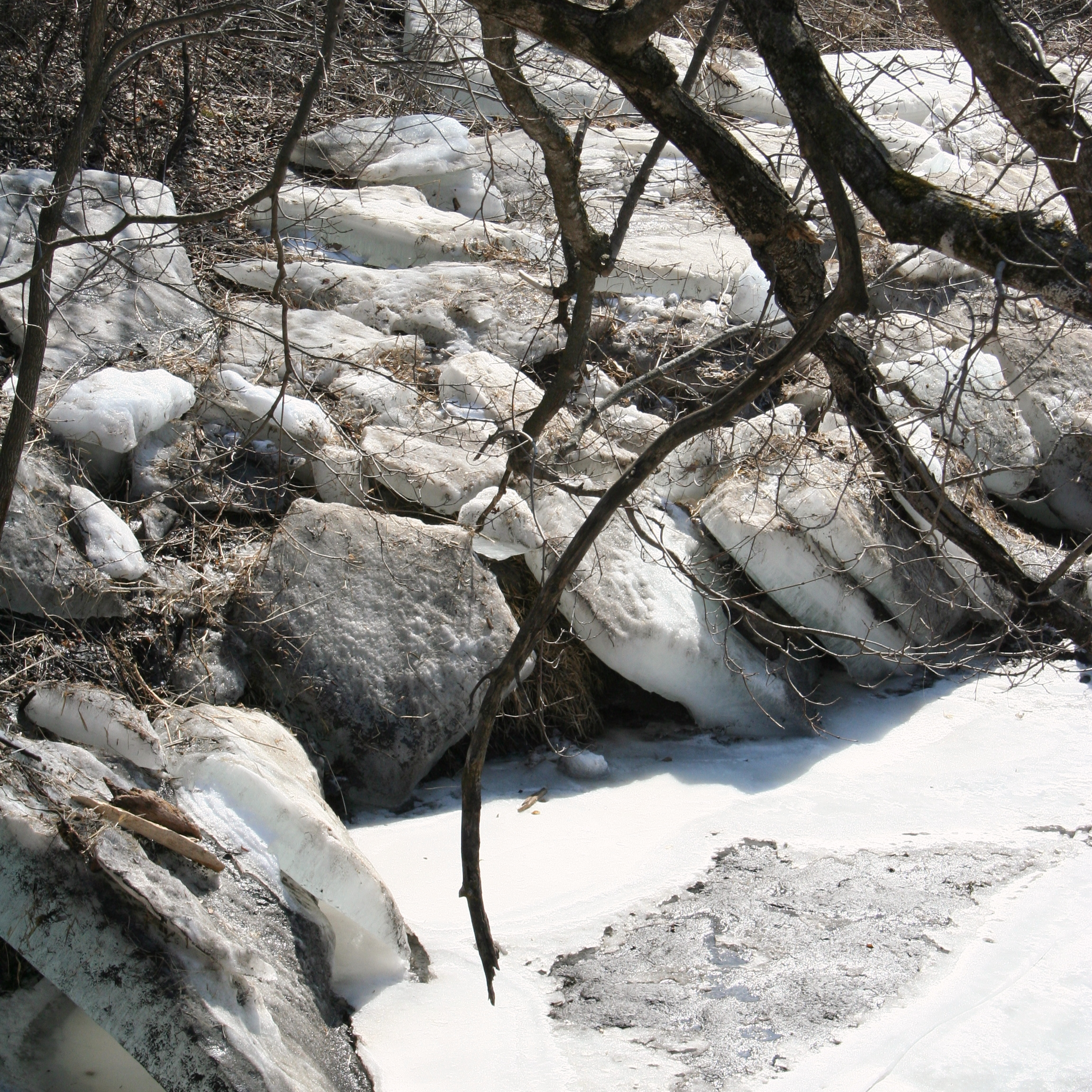
Statue of Washington outside Federal Hall National Memorial in New York City, overlooking Wall Street

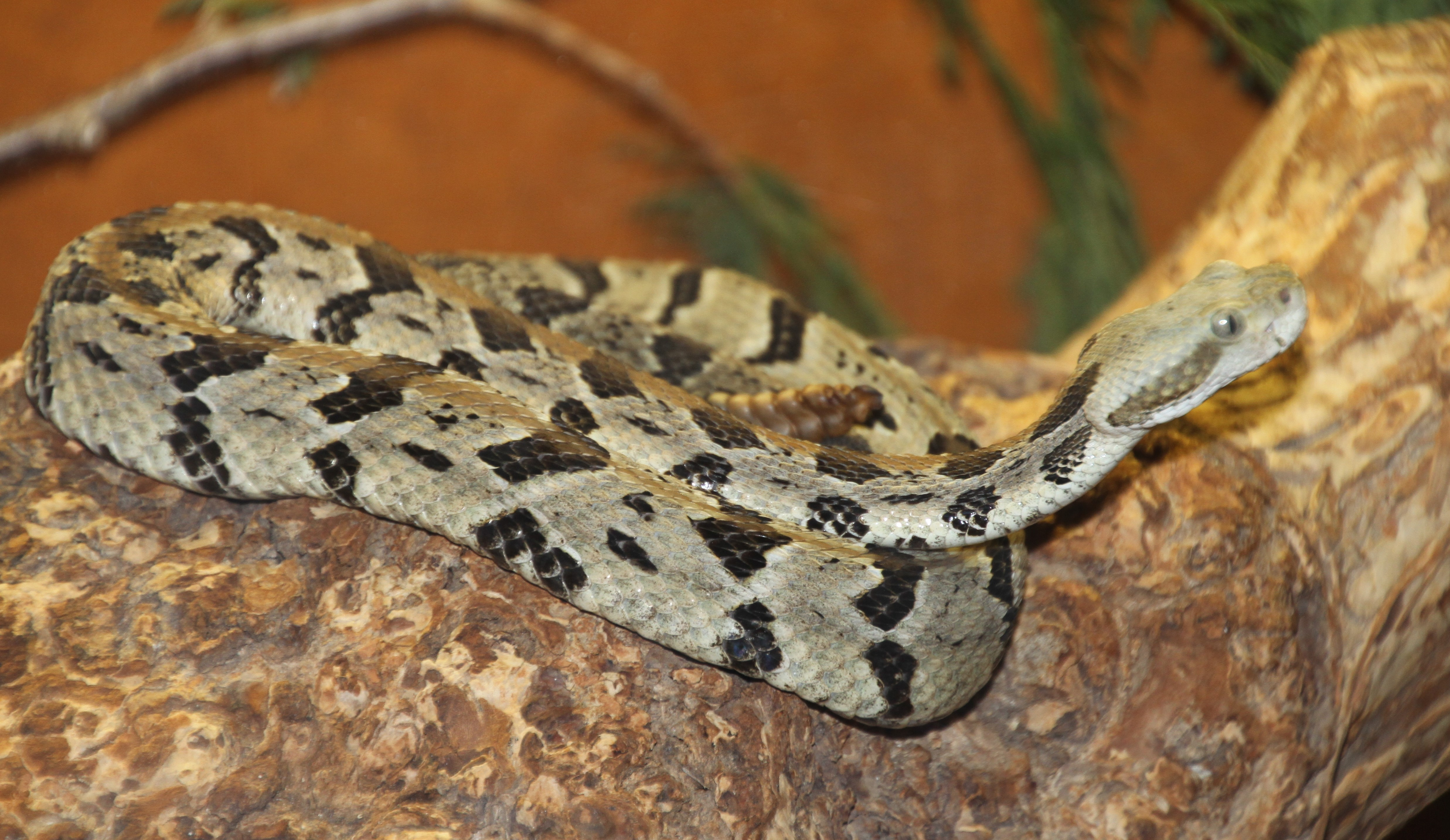
A rattlesnake at the Zollman Zoo

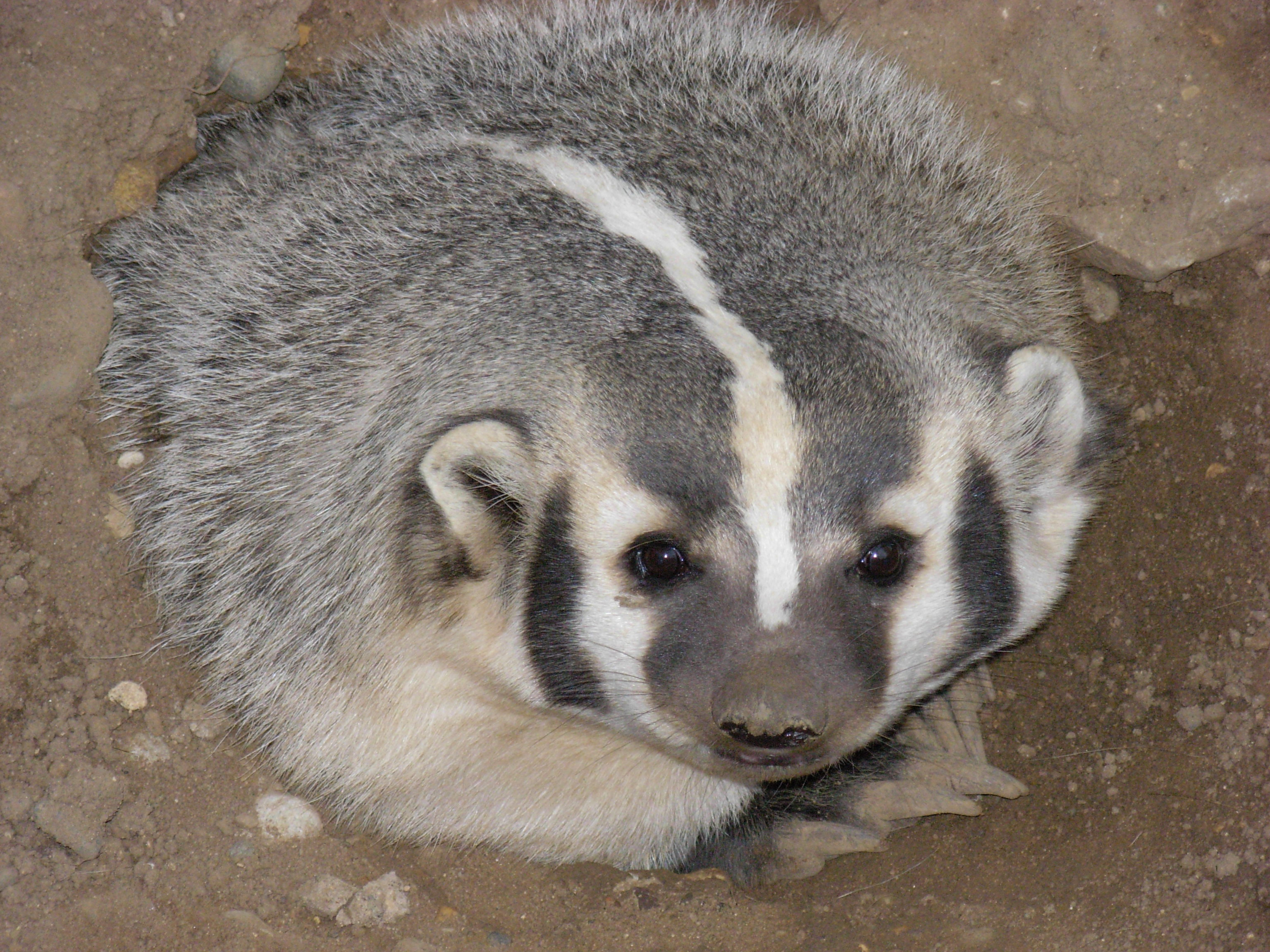
A badger at the Zoo

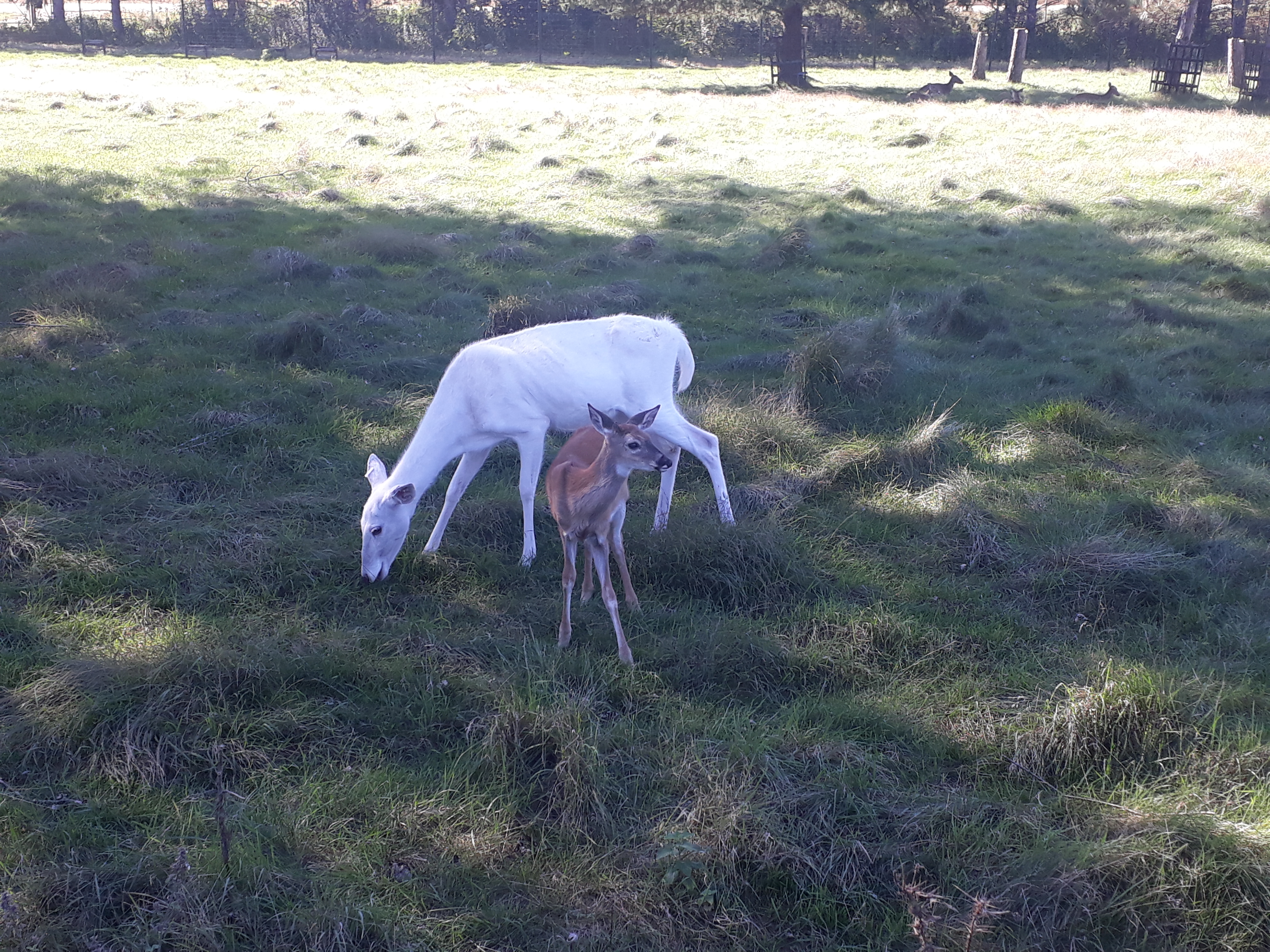
White tailed deer at Oxbow Park and Zollman Zoo
