= Oxbow Lake (Virginia) =

Lake in St. Paul, Virginia, U.S.

- Location within Virginia Location within the United States
- Location: St. Paul, Virginia
- Coordinates: 36.9040°N 82.3207°W
- Basin countries: United States

Oxbow Lake, located in Saint Paul, Virginia, offers the Saint Paul community a recreational area with walking and biking paths, a fishing area, and a picnic area.
