= Mohegan (disambiguation) =

The Mohegan are an ethnic group of Connecticut, United States.

Mohegan may also refer to:

- Mohegan Tribe, the federally recognized tribe of the Mohegan people
- Mohegan language, an Algonquian language
- SS Mohegan, a steamship wrecked off the coast of Cornwall, United Kingdom
- Mohegan, West Virginia, an unincorporated community in West Virginia, United States
- Lake Mohegan, New York, a census-designated place in Westchester County, New York, United States
- Mohegan Lake (Hamilton County, New York), a lake in New York, United States
- Mohegan Hill, an elevation in Otsego County, New York, United States
- Mohegan (company), formerly Mohegan Tribal Gaming Authority, then Mohegan Gaming & Entertainment
  - Mohegan Pennsylvania, a Mohegan casino
  - Mohegan Sun, a Mohegan casino
  - Mohegan Sun Arena, a Mohegan sports arena

== See also ==
- Mahegan
- Mohican (disambiguation)
