= Owls Head Mountain =

Mountain in New York, United States

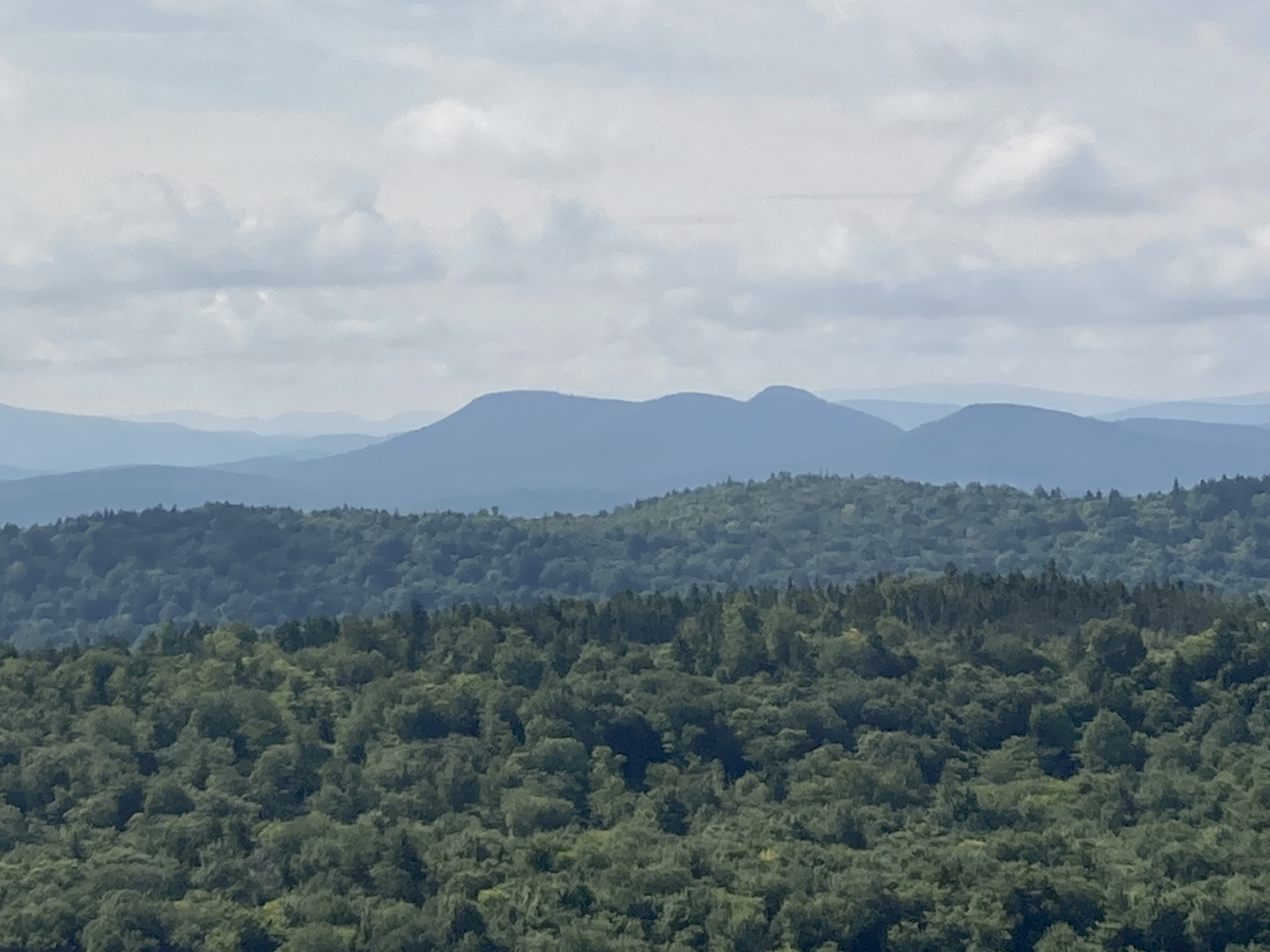
- The north side of Owls Head Mountain pictured from nearby Buck Mountain.

Highest point
- Elevation: 2,786 feet (849 m)
- Coordinates: 43°57′16″N 74°29′56″W

Geography
- Location within New York Adirondack Park Location within the United States
- Location: Franklin County, New York, U.S.
- Topo map: USGS Deerland

Owls Head Mountain is a 2,786-foot-tall (849 m) mountain in the Adirondack Mountains region of New York. It is located west-southwest of the hamlet of Long Lake in Hamilton County.

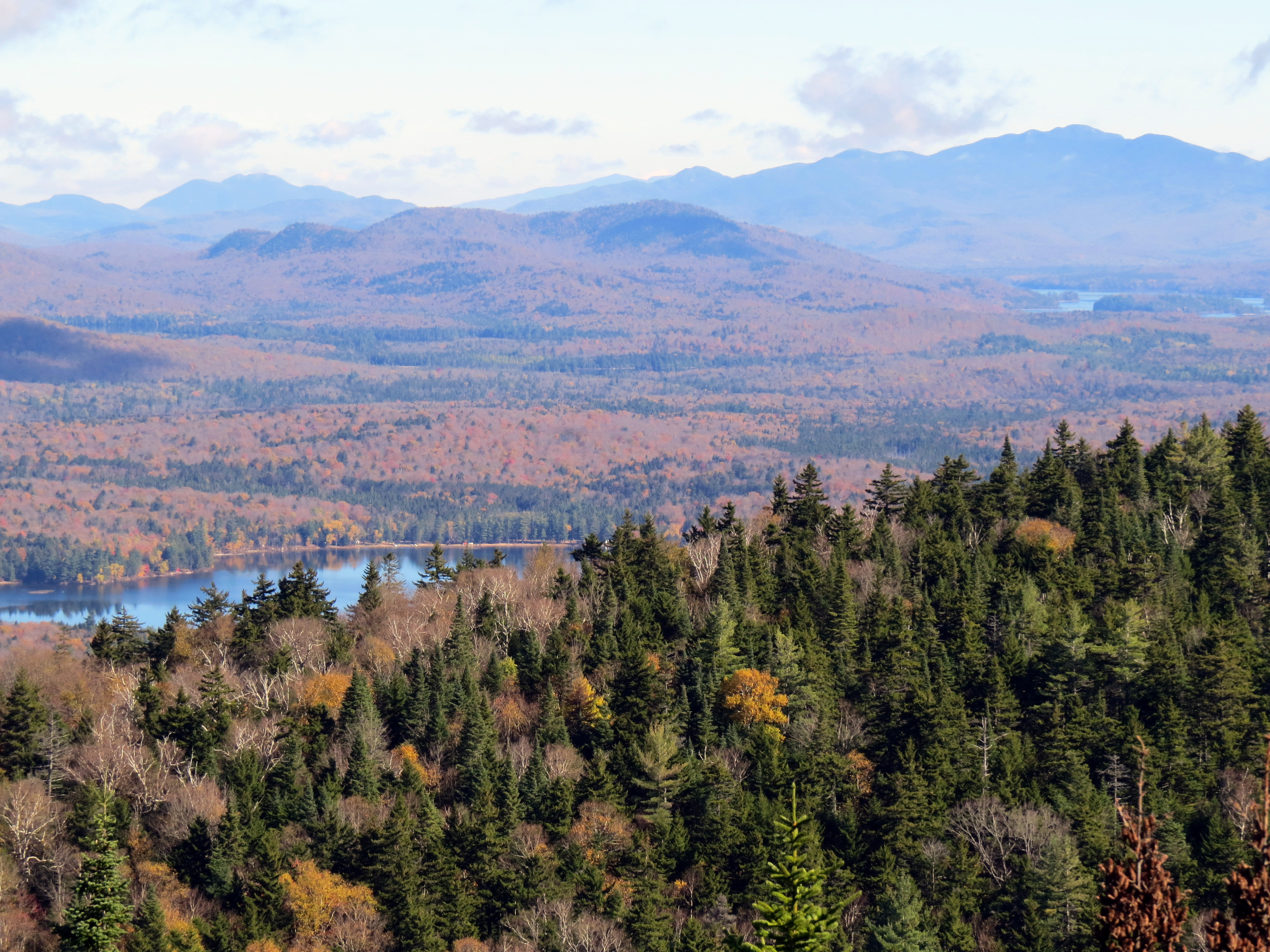
The View from Owls Head Mountain fire tower

It can be climbed from a trailhead on Endion Road off New York Route 30, just north of the hamlet of Long Lake. The trail provides a 3.2-mile (5.1 km) ascent with a gain of 1,200-foot (370 m); a side trail leads to Lake Eaton. The view from the summit includes 14-mile (23 km) Long Lake, part of the Raquette River. The Owls Head Mountain Forest Fire Observation Station, a 35-foot-tall (11 m) Aermotor steel fire tower affords a 360-degree view of the central Adirondacks and Adirondack High Peaks region; nearer peaks include Kempshall Mountain on the shore of Long Lake, and the fire towers of Blue Mountain, Wakely Mountain, Snowy Mountain, Goodnow Mountain and Mount Arab. The trail to the summit passes the foundation of the old fire observer's cabin.

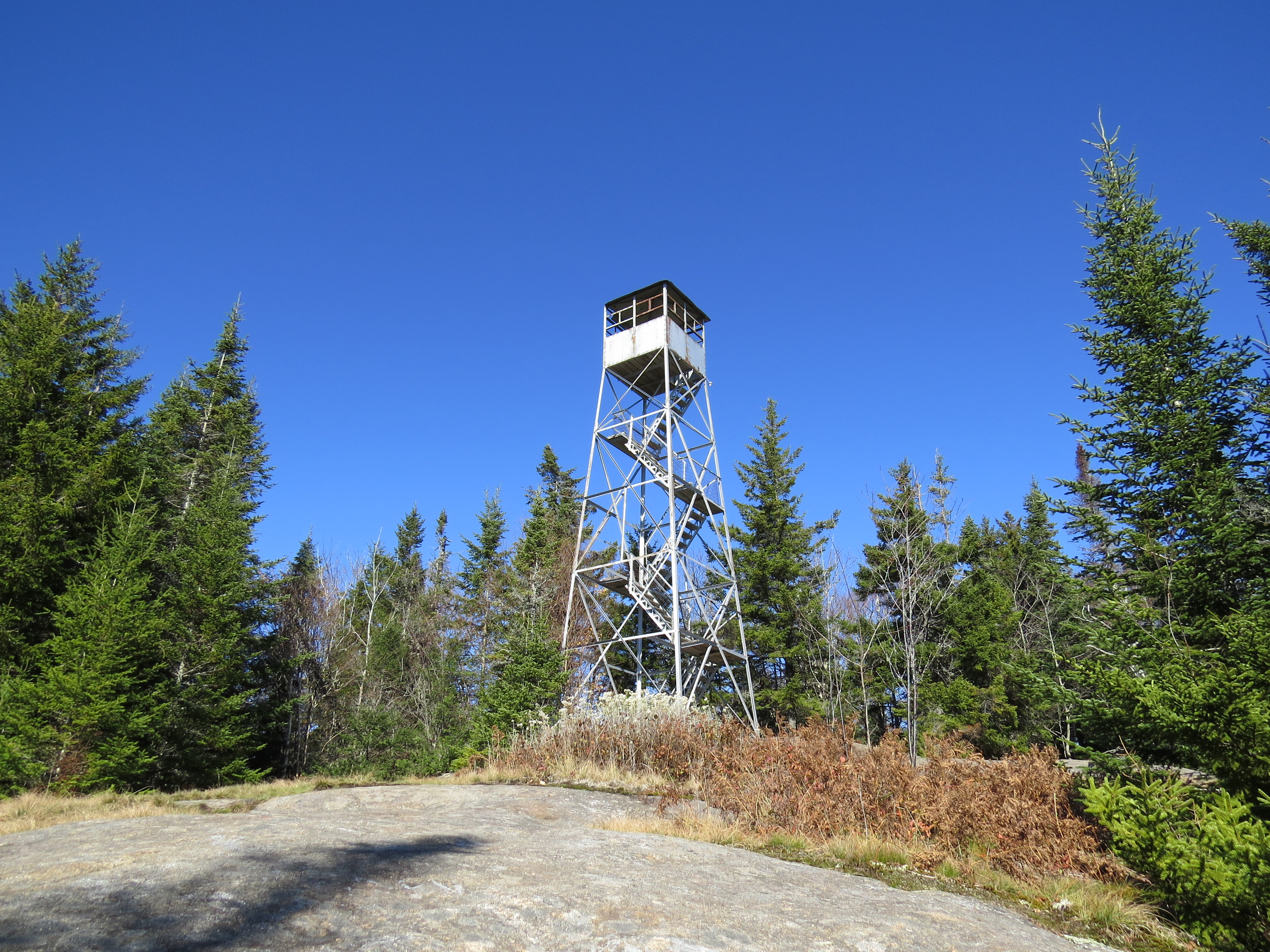
The Owls Head Mountain fire tower

After a 1908 forest fire destroyed nearby Long Lake West (now known as Sabattis), New York State Conservation Department built a wooden fire tower on Owls Head Mountain in 1911 that was replaced in 1919 by the present tower. The tower was closed in 1970 as airplanes replaced fire observers. It has been restored and opened to the public.
