= Long Lake (CDP), New York =

Long Lake, New York
- Census-designated place Hamlet
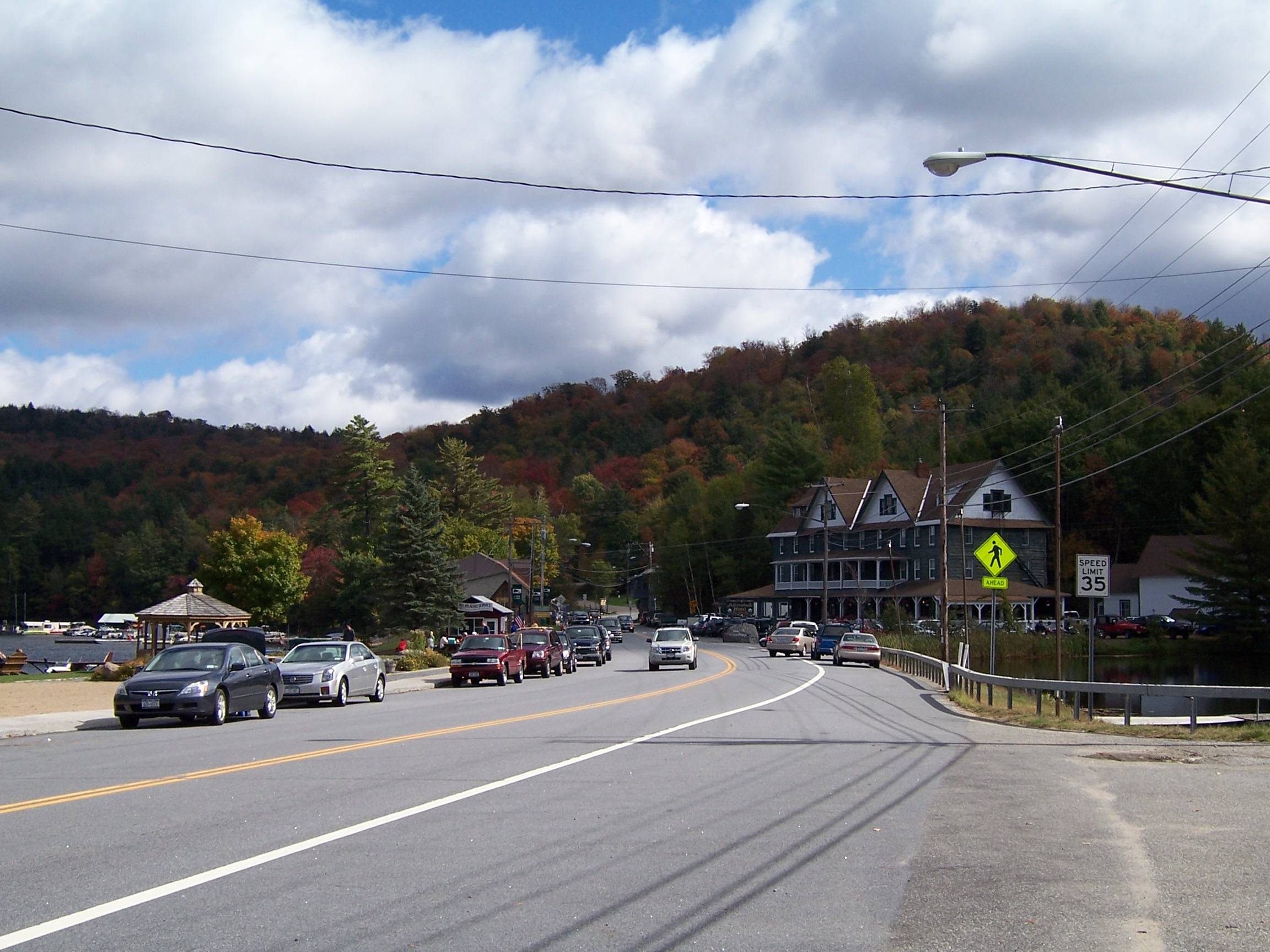
- The Adirondack Hotel in the hamlet of Long Lake

- Location within New York Location within the United States
- Coordinates: 43°58′18″N 74°25′13″W
- Country: United States
- State: New York
- County: Hamilton
- Town: Long Lake

Area
  - Total: 11.80 sq mi (30.56 km^{2})
  - Land: 9.35 sq mi (24.21 km^{2})
  - Water: 2.45 sq mi (6.35 km^{2}) 15.8%
- Elevation: 1,670 ft (510 m)

Population (2020)
  - Total: 596
  - Density: 63.8/sq mi (24.62/km^{2})
- Time zone: UTC-5 (Eastern (EST))
  - Summer (DST): UTC-4 (EDT)
- ZIP code: 12847
- Area code: 518
- FIPS code: 36-43401
- GNIS feature ID: 2628176

Long Lake is a census-designated place (CDP) and hamlet in the town of Long Lake, Hamilton County, New York, United States. The population was 596 at the 2020 census, out of 791 in the town of Long Lake as a whole.

Long Lake is within the Adirondack Park.

== Geography ==
The community is located in the northeastern part of Hamilton County, surrounding the southwestern half of the water body Long Lake. The center of the community is on the southeastern side of the lake, where New York State Route 30 crosses. The community extends southwest along Long Lake to include the hamlet of Deerland. Route 30 leads north 21 miles (34 km) to Tupper Lake, and south 11 miles (18 km) to Blue Mountain Lake. New York State Route 28N runs east from Long Lake 14 miles (23 km) to Newcomb, and south with Route 30 to Blue Mountain Lake.

According to the United States Census Bureau, the CDP has a total area of 13.9 square miles (36.1 km^{2}), of which 11.7 square miles (30.4 km^{2}) are land and 2.2 square miles (5.7 km^{2}), or 15.86%, are water. Long Lake, the water body, runs northeastward from the Long Lake CDP and is drained by the Raquette River, a northward-flowing tributary of the St. Lawrence River.

Historical population
Census	Pop.	Note	%±
2010	547		—
2020	596		9.0%
U.S. Decennial Census
