= Adirondack Canoe Classic =

Canoe race in New York, US

Coordinates: 43.711898°N 74.969276°W

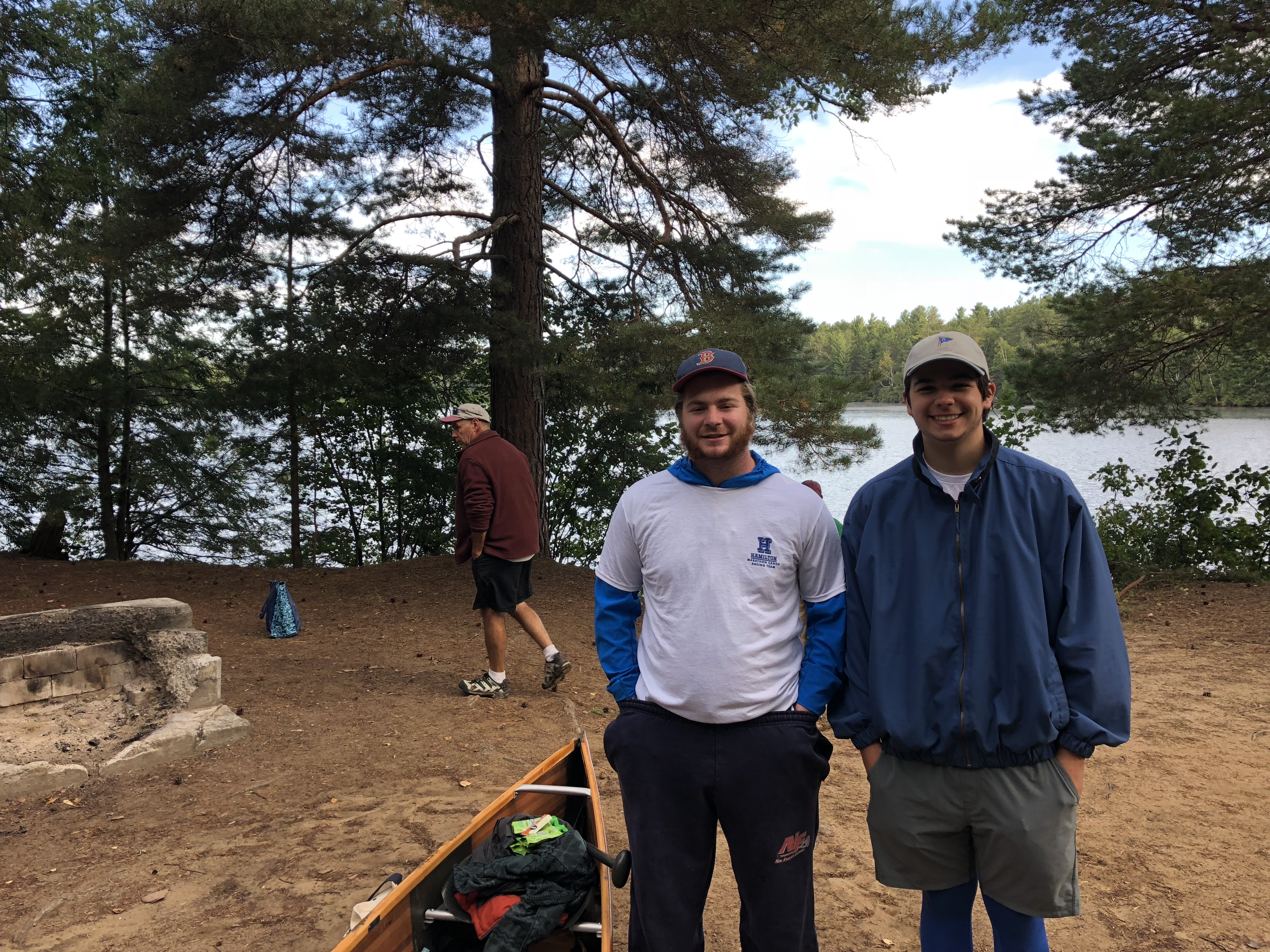
Two Hamilton College paddlers before embarkment, on the third day

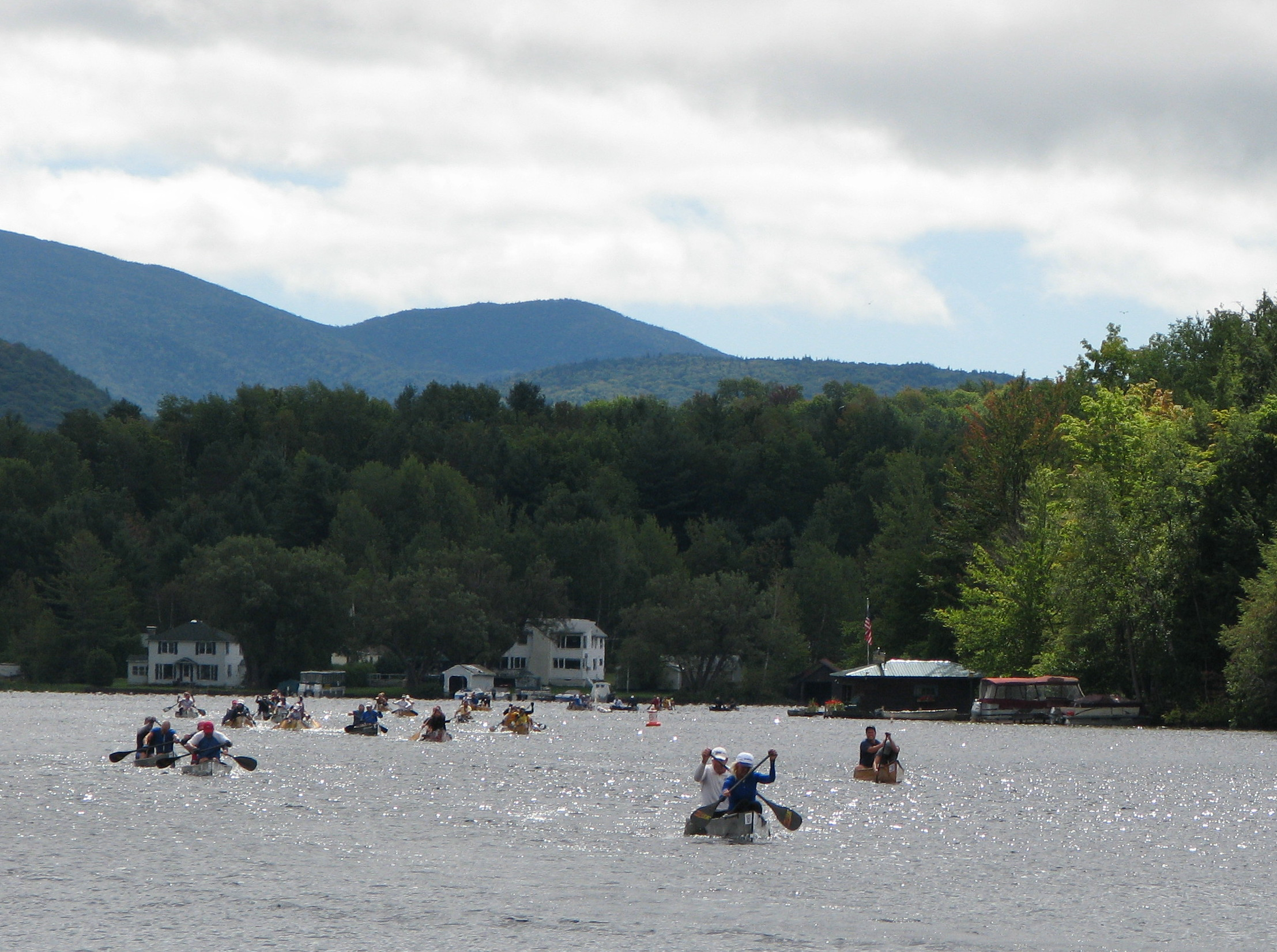
The home stretch, third day

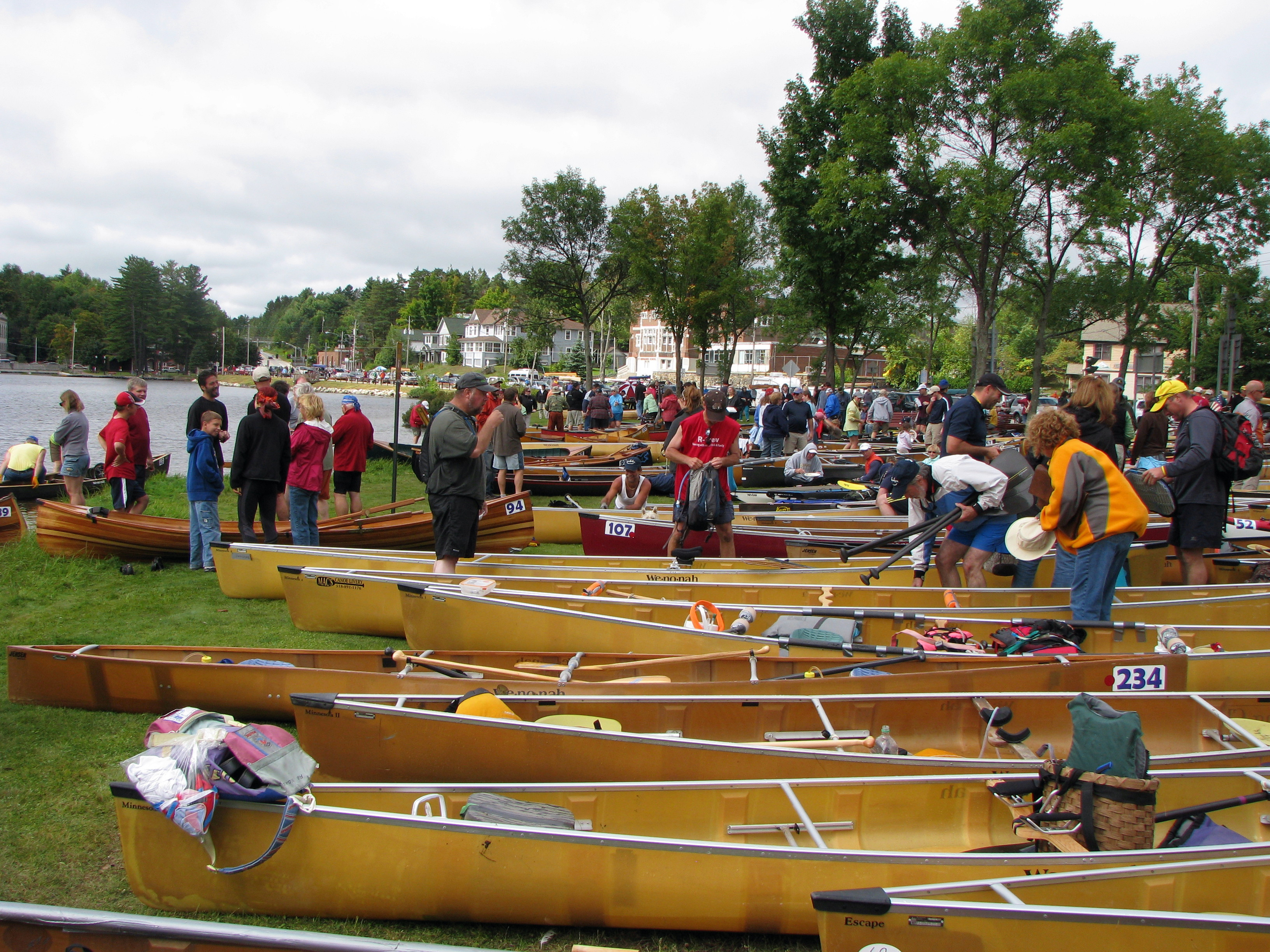
Shore parking gets tight

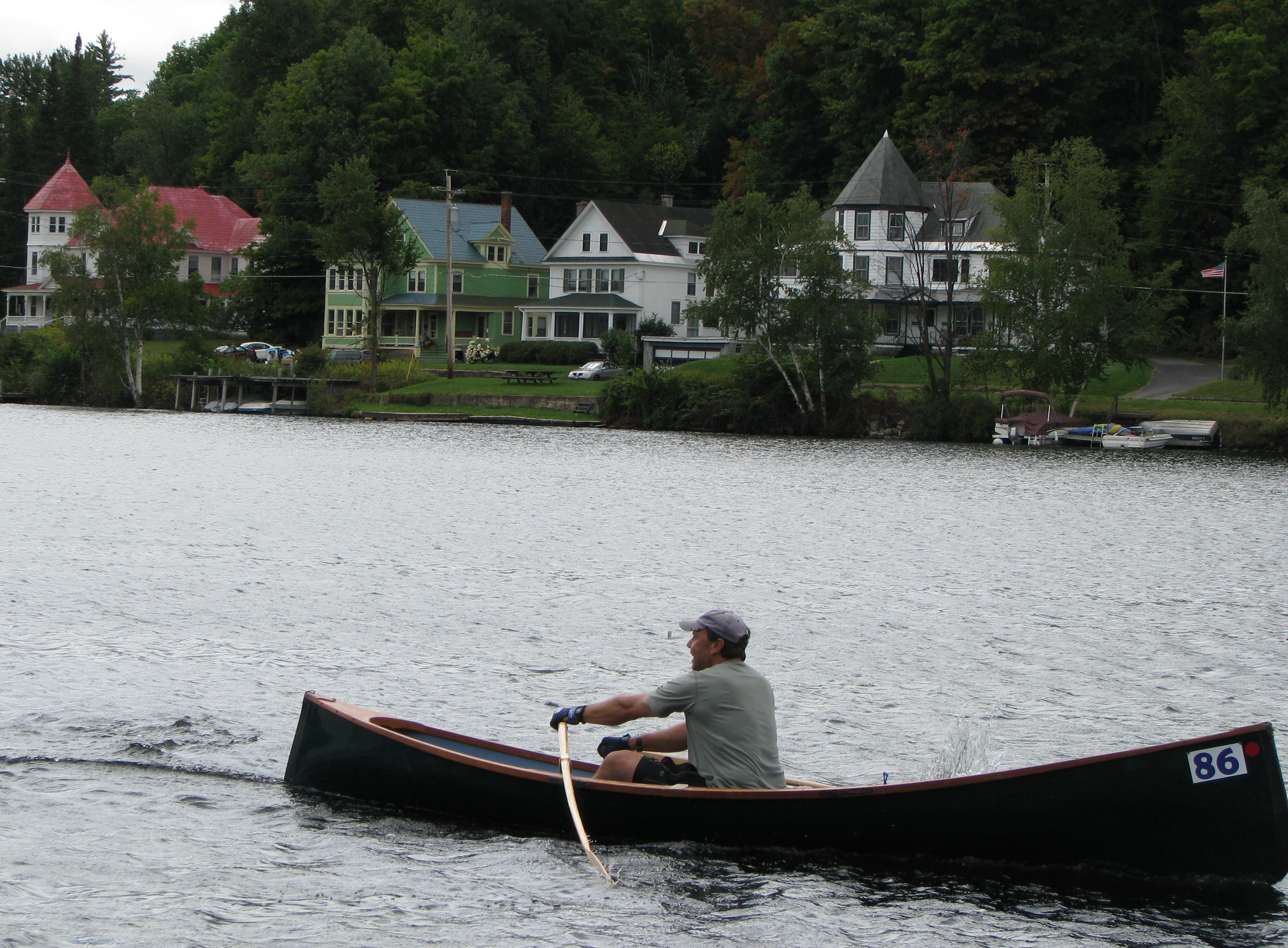
Classes include one and two-man guideboats

The Adirondack Canoe Classic, also known as the 90-miler, is a three-day, 90-mile (140 km) canoe race from Old Forge to Saranac Lake in the Adirondacks of New York, United States. The race has drawn as many as 500 competitors from California to Florida, New Zealand and Canada paddling 250 canoes, kayaks and guideboats. Included in the ninety mile length is 5.25 miles (8.45 km) of carries.

Held every fall since 1983, the race follows routes traveled by the region’s early settlers and Adirondack guides, a chain of lakes, rivers and carries that is also the first leg of the Northern Forest Canoe Trail.

== Entrants ==
The race is limited to 275 boats and fills soon after applications are made available. While each year sees a substantial number of true racers, the largest classes are recreational paddlers. Many older paddlers participate well into their 70s, and C4 boats with four generations of a family are not unknown.

There have been many collegiate teams that have competed in the race. Hamilton College has a canoe racing team that takes part in the 90-miler every year. In 2018, the Hamilton team sent 20 paddlers who all completed the course.

Classes include C1, C2, C4, K1, K2, War Canoe and Guideboats.

== The route ==
The original course followed the historic "Highway of the Adirondacks", a continuous route from Old Forge, via the Moose River through the Fulton Chain Lakes, to Raquette Lake, then via the Raquette River to Forked Lake, Long Lake and finally via the Stony Creek Ponds and the Indian Carry to Upper Saranac Lake. The route then proceeded via Bartletts Carry to Middle Saranac Lake and Lower Saranac Lake, ending at the New York State Boat Launch on Lake Flower in downtown Saranac Lake.

Over the years, the route has been adjusted to deal with the logistics of what has become a 250-boat race. The route is now broken into three discontinuous one-day segments—the endpoints are chosen with accommodations in mind. As a result, the first day's route now proceeds from Old Forge via the Fulton chain, proceeding to the Marion River and the Eckford chain of Lakes to Blue Mountain Lake.

The second day's race starts near the bottom of Long Lake proceeds via the Raquette River to the New York State boat launch on New York State Route 3, five miles (8 km) east of Tupper Lake.

The third day starts at the state campground on Fish Creek, off of Upper Saranac Lake and then proceeds via Bartletts Carry to Middle Saranac Lake, the Saranac River, Lower Saranac Lake, Oseetah Lake and Lake Flower, where the race ends at Prescott Park in the village of Saranac Lake. There are 5.25 miles (8.45 km) of carries.

The race is hosted by the New York State Department of Environmental Conservation, the Central Adirondack Association, and the Adirondack Watershed Alliance. In 2005 and 2006, the event was named race of the year by the New York Marathon Canoe Racing Association.

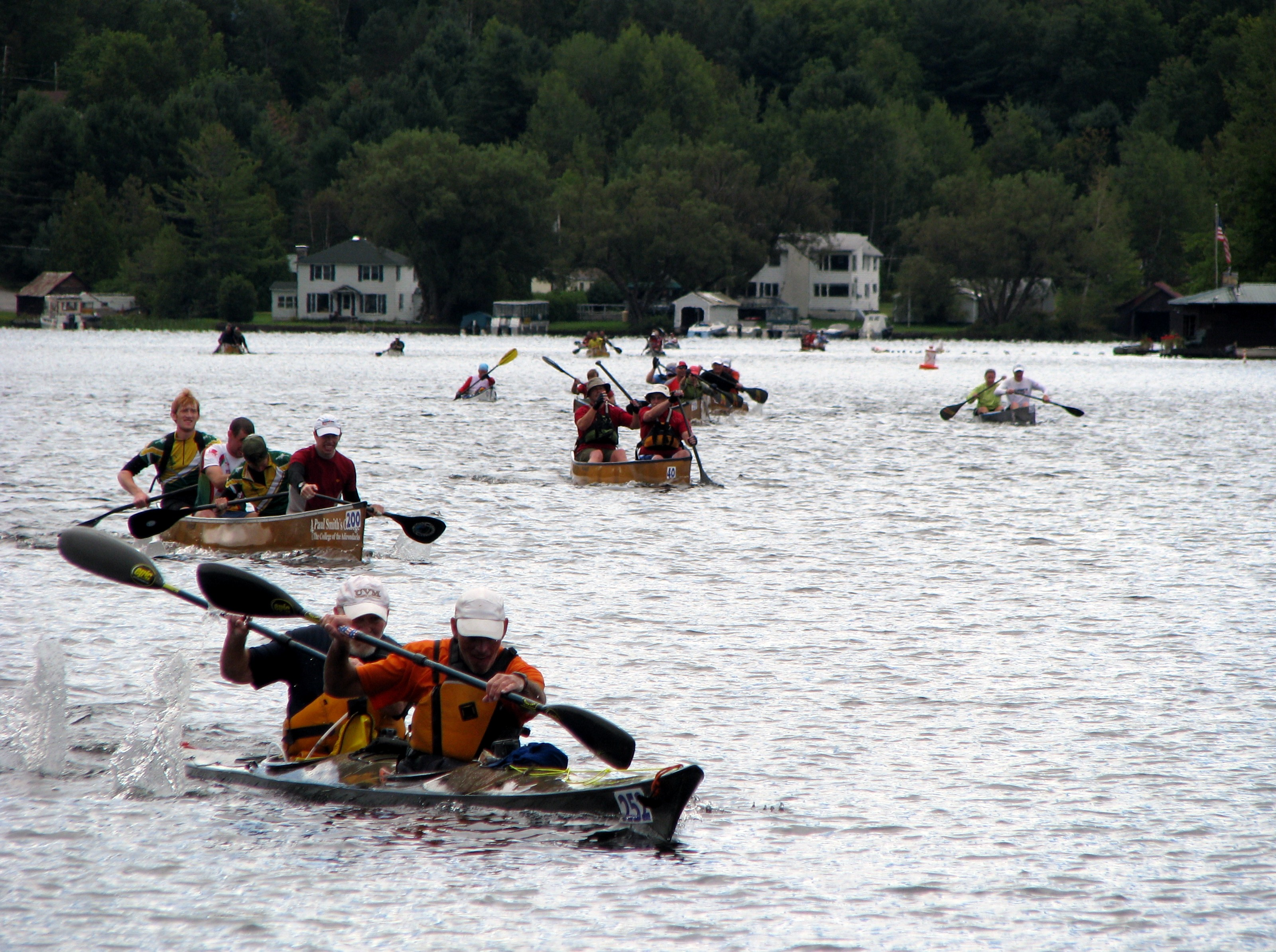
Nearing the finish

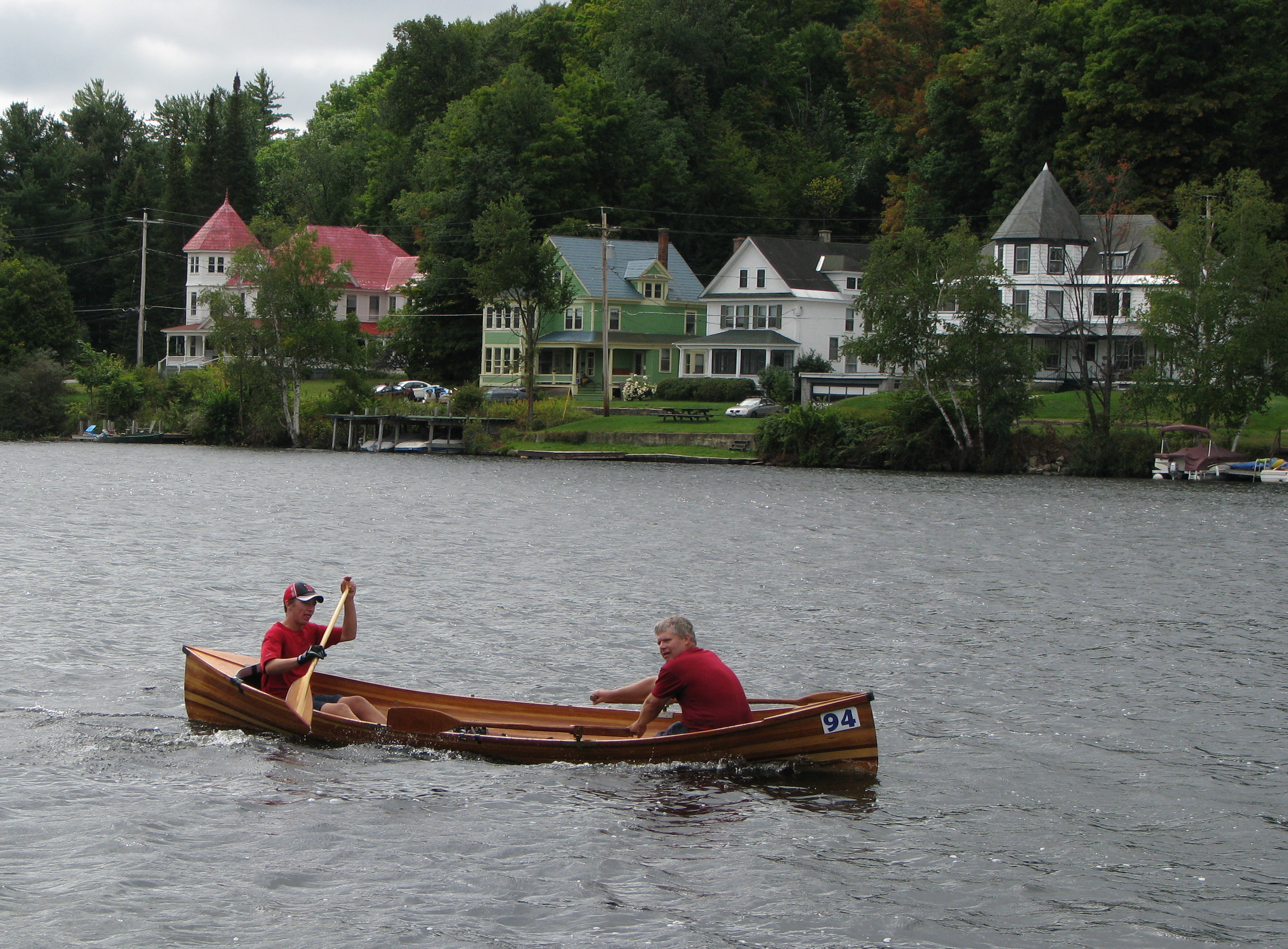
Two-person guideboat

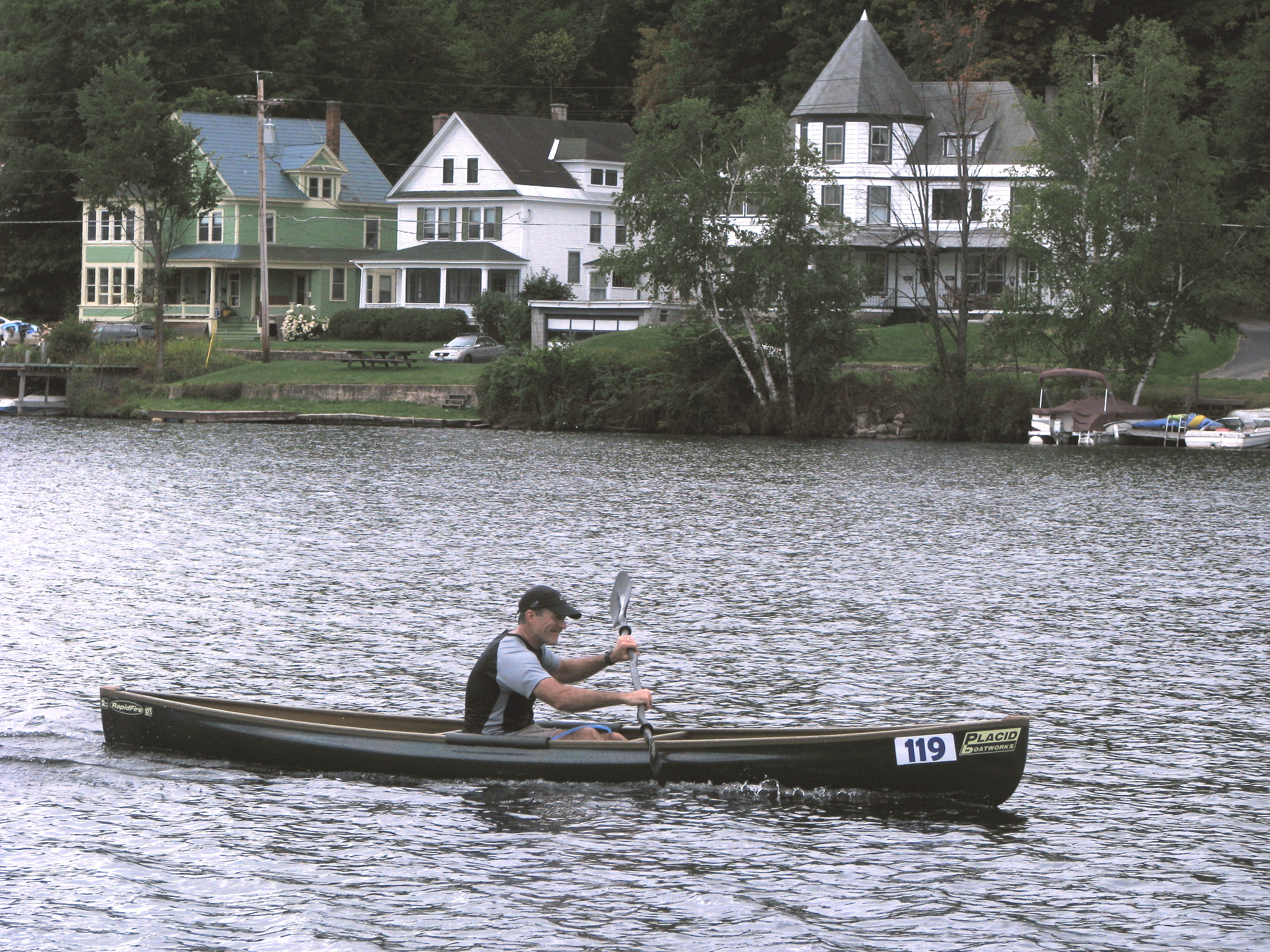
Joe Moore, repeat winner of the Men's Solo Rec

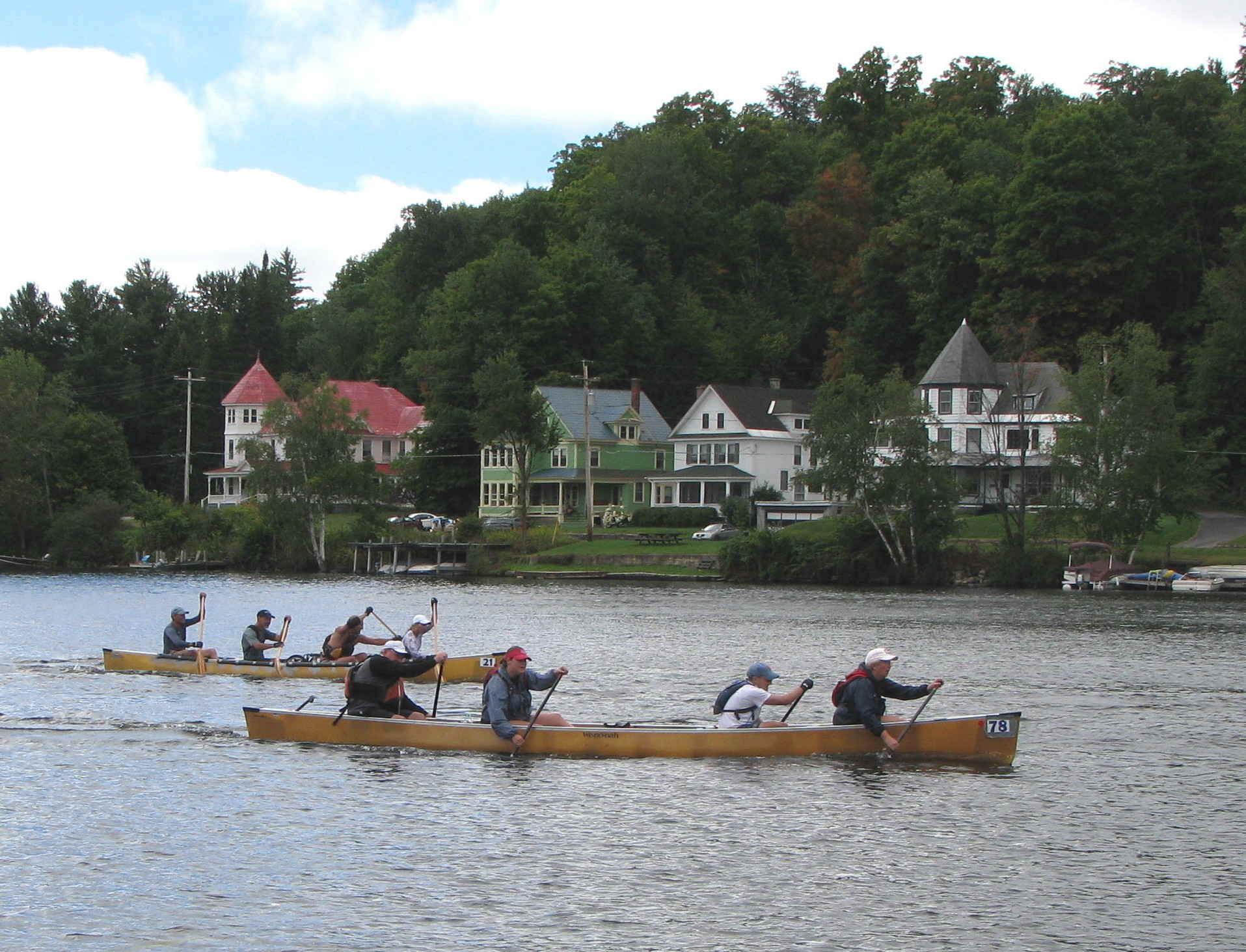
C4 is a popular class
