= South Pond =

Sound Pond may refer to:

- South Pond, Massachusetts, a village in Plymouth, Massachusetts, United States
- South Pond (Hamilton County, New York), a lake located south of Deerland, New York, United States
- South Pond (Herkimer County, New York), a lake northeast of Big Moose, New York, United States
- South Pond Mountain, a summit in the Adirondack Mountains, New York, United States
- South Pond Refectory, a restaurant building in Lincoln Park, Chicago, Illinois, United States
