= Mochican =

Mochican may refer to:

- Mohicans, an Eastern Algonquian Native American tribe
- Moche culture, a native culture of Peru
- Mochica language, a native language of Peru

== See also ==
- Mohican (disambiguation)
- Mohegan people, a Native American tribe based in Southeastern Connecticut
