= Lower Sister Lake =

- Location within New York Lower Sister Lake (the United States)
- Location: Hamilton County, New York, United States
- Coordinates: 43°52′36″N 74°46′06″W
- Type: Lake
- Basin countries: United States
- Surface area: 147 acres (0.59 km^{2})
- Max. depth: 11 feet (3.4 m)
- Shore length^{1}: 2.1 miles (3.4 km)
- Surface elevation: 1,936 feet (590 m)
- Settlements: Raquette Lake, New York
- ^{1} Shore length is not a well-defined measure.

Lower Sister Lake is located northwest of the hamlet of Raquette Lake, New York. Fish species present in the lake are brook trout, yellow perch, and black bullhead. There is a trail from the east shore of Big Moose Lake. No motors are allowed on this lake.

== See also ==
- Upper Sister Lake
