= Kempshall Mountain =

Mountain in New York, United States

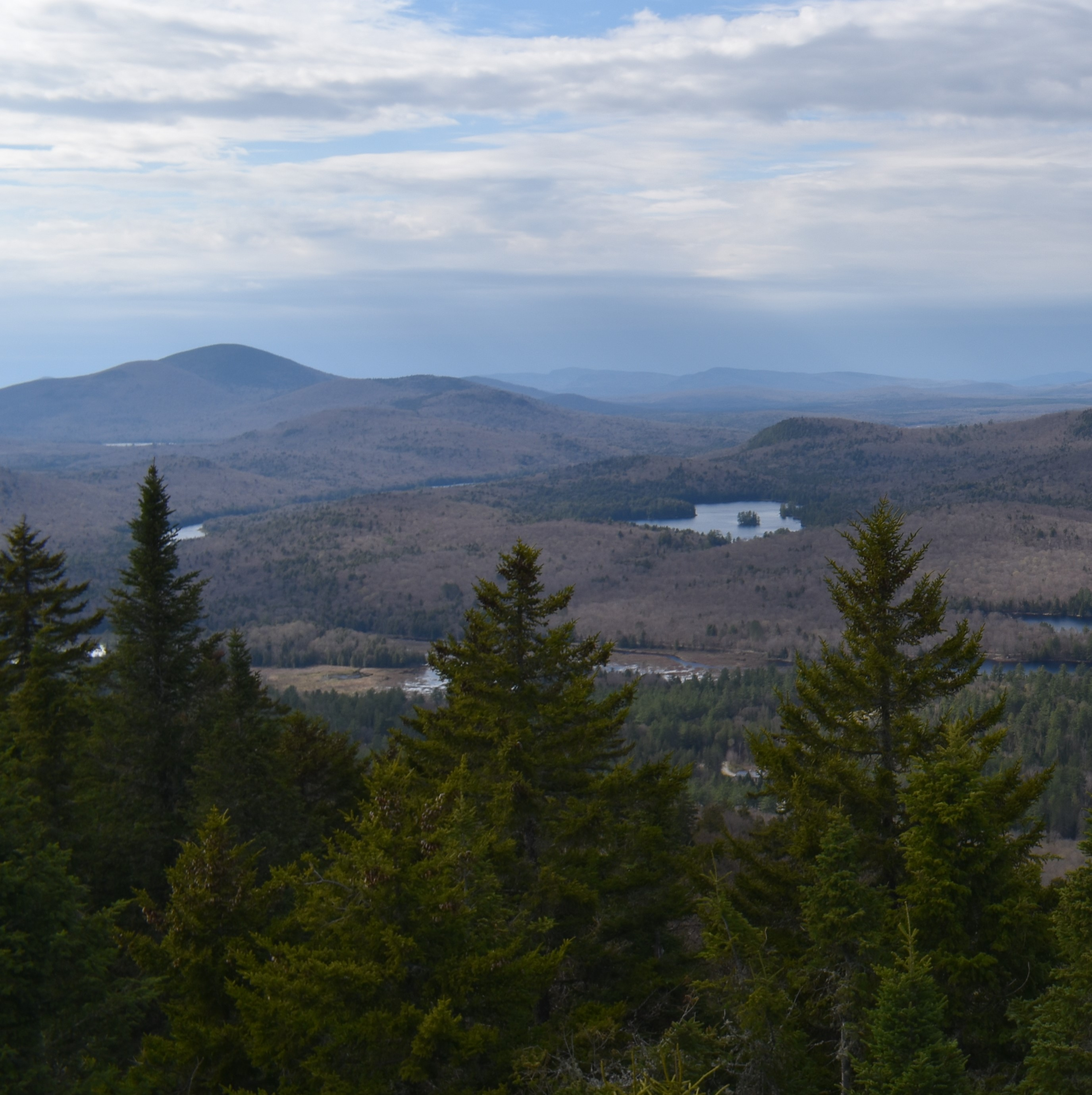
- Kempshall Mountain (left) from Goodnow Mountain

Highest point
- Elevation: 3,350 feet (1,020 m)
- Coordinates: 44°01′25″N 74°19′38″W

Geography
- Location within New York Adirondack Park Location within the United States
- Location: NE of Long Lake, Hamilton County, New York, U.S.
- Topo map: USGS Kempshall Mountain

Kempshall Mountain is a 3,350-foot-tall (1,020 m) mountain located in Adirondack Mountains of New York. It is located in the northwest of the hamlet of Long Lake in Hamilton County. In 1918, a 35-foot-tall (11 m) Aermotor LS40 tower was built on the mountain for fire lookout purposes. Due to aerial detection being used, the tower ceased fire lookout operations at the end of the 1971 season. The tower was later removed, and portions of the tower along with the tower from West Mountain were used to build the tower that is at the Essex County Historical Museum in Elizabethtown.

== History ==
In May 1911, the first structure was built on the mountain, which was a wooden tower built by the Conservation Commission. In 1918, the wood tower was replaced with a 35-foot-tall (11 m) Aermotor LS40 tower. Due to aerial detection being used, the tower ceased fire lookout operations at the end of the 1971 season. The tower was later removed because it was deemed a "non-conforming" structure in the new High Peaks Wilderness Area. Portions of the tower along with the tower from West Mountain were used to build the tower that is at the Essex County Historical Museum in Elizabethtown.
