= Sagamore Lake =

- Location within New York Sagamore Lake (the United States)
- Location: Hamilton County, New York, United States
- Coordinates: 43°46′05″N 74°37′09″W
- Type: Lake
- Primary outflows: South Inlet
- Basin countries: United States
- Surface area: 172 acres (0.70 km^{2})
- Average depth: 34 feet (10 m)
- Max. depth: 75 feet (23 m)
- Shore length^{1}: 2.5 miles (4.0 km)
- Surface elevation: 1,906 feet (581 m)
- Settlements: Raquette Lake, New York
- ^{1} Shore length is not a well-defined measure.

Sagamore Lake is located south of Raquette Lake, New York. Sagamore Lake was known as Shedd Lake before being renamed "Sagamore Lake" by Alfred G. Vanderbilt after he purchased Great Camp Sagamore in 1901. South Inlet is the outlet creek, which flows into Raquette Lake. Fish species present in the lake are brook trout, lake whitefish, lake trout, white sucker, black bullhead, yellow perch, and sunfish. There is access by trail from Sagamore Road on the northwest shore. Only non-motorized boats are allowed on the lake.
