= Lake Flower =

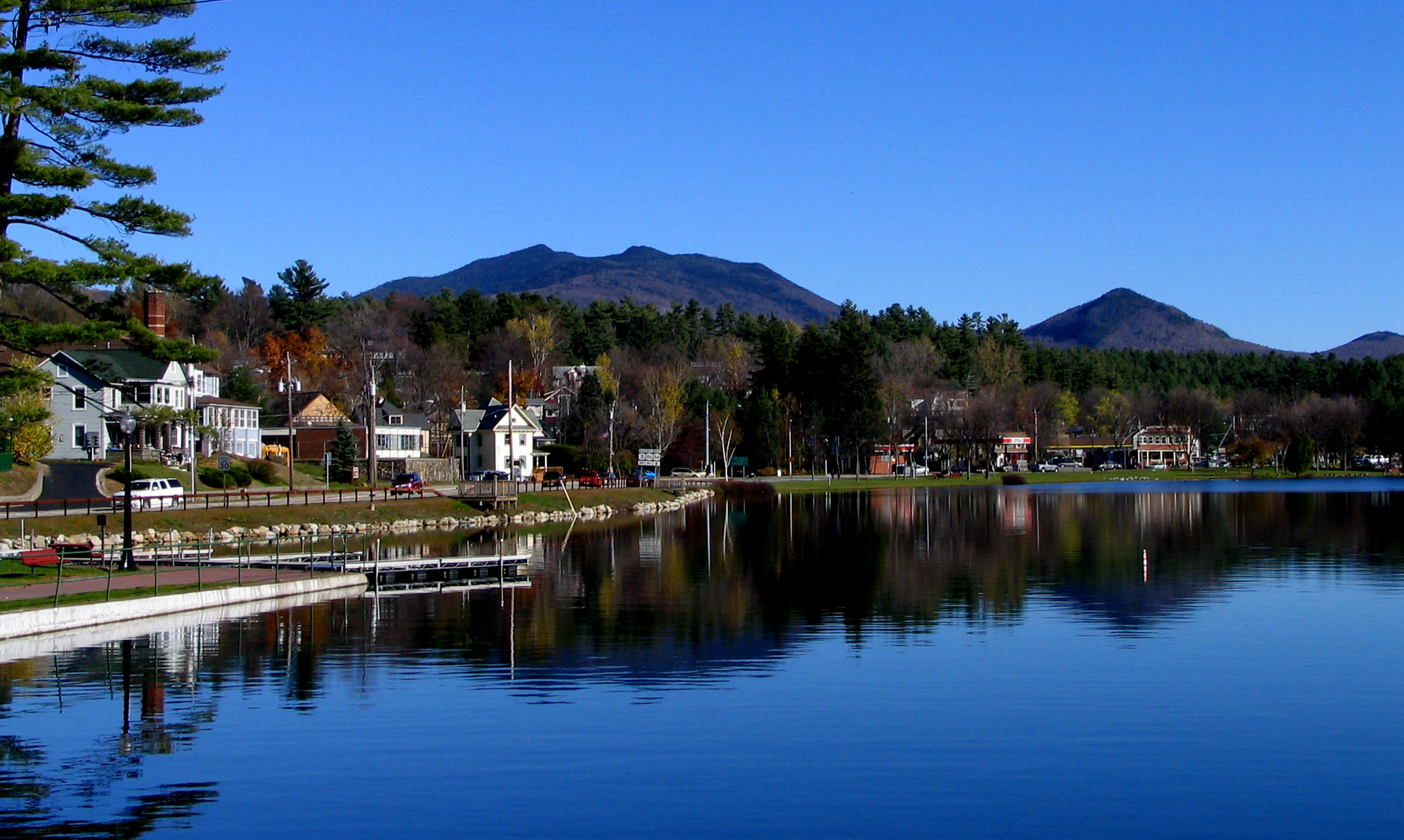
- Lake Flower from Riverside Park in Saranac Lake

- Location within New York
- Location: Franklin County and Essex County, New York
- Coordinates: 44°18′56″N 74°07′27″W
- Type: man made lake
- Basin countries: United States
- Surface area: 300 acres (120 ha)
- Surface elevation: 1,529 ft (466 m)

Lake Flower is a 300-acre (120 ha) lake in Franklin County and Essex County in the Adirondack Mountains of Upstate New York in the United States. The lake was created by damming the Saranac River in 1827. It was originally called the Mill Pond, but was later named for New York Governor Roswell P. Flower. It is the only lake within the village of Saranac Lake. The village and the lake are divided between the towns of Harrietstown and North Elba. The lake shore is almost entirely in private hands.

It is the site of the annual Willard Hanmer Guideboat & Canoe Race held each July in Saranac Lake since 1962; it is a race of ten miles (16 km), for guideboats, canoes and kayaks. The Adirondack Canoe Classic, a three-day 90-Mile race from Old Forge to Saranac Lake, ends on Lake Flower.

Lake Flower is the source of ice for Saranac Lake's Ice Palace, built each year during Winter Carnival.

== Sources ==
- Harder, Kelsie B., and Poole, Carol Payment, Place Names of Franklin County, New York, TEACH Services, Inc., 2008, ISBN 978-1572585188
- Jamieson, Paul and Morris, Donald, Adirondack Canoe Waters, North Flow, Lake George, NY: Adirondack Mountain Club, 1987. ISBN 0-935272-43-7.
