= Russian Lake =

- Location within New York Russian Lake (the United States)
- Location: Hamilton County, New York, United States
- Coordinates: 43°50′37″N 74°48′08″W
- Type: Lake
- Basin countries: United States
- Surface area: 39 acres (0.16 km^{2})
- Average depth: 6 feet (1.8 m)
- Max. depth: 21 feet (6.4 m)
- Shore length^{1}: 1.3 miles (2.1 km)
- Surface elevation: 1,857 feet (566 m)
- Islands: 1
- Settlements: Raquette Lake, New York
- ^{1} Shore length is not a well-defined measure.

Russian Lake is located west of Raquette Lake, New York. Fish species present in the lake are black bullhead, and yellow perch. There is trail access from the east shore of Big Moose Lake.
