= Fire train =

Train used to fight fires

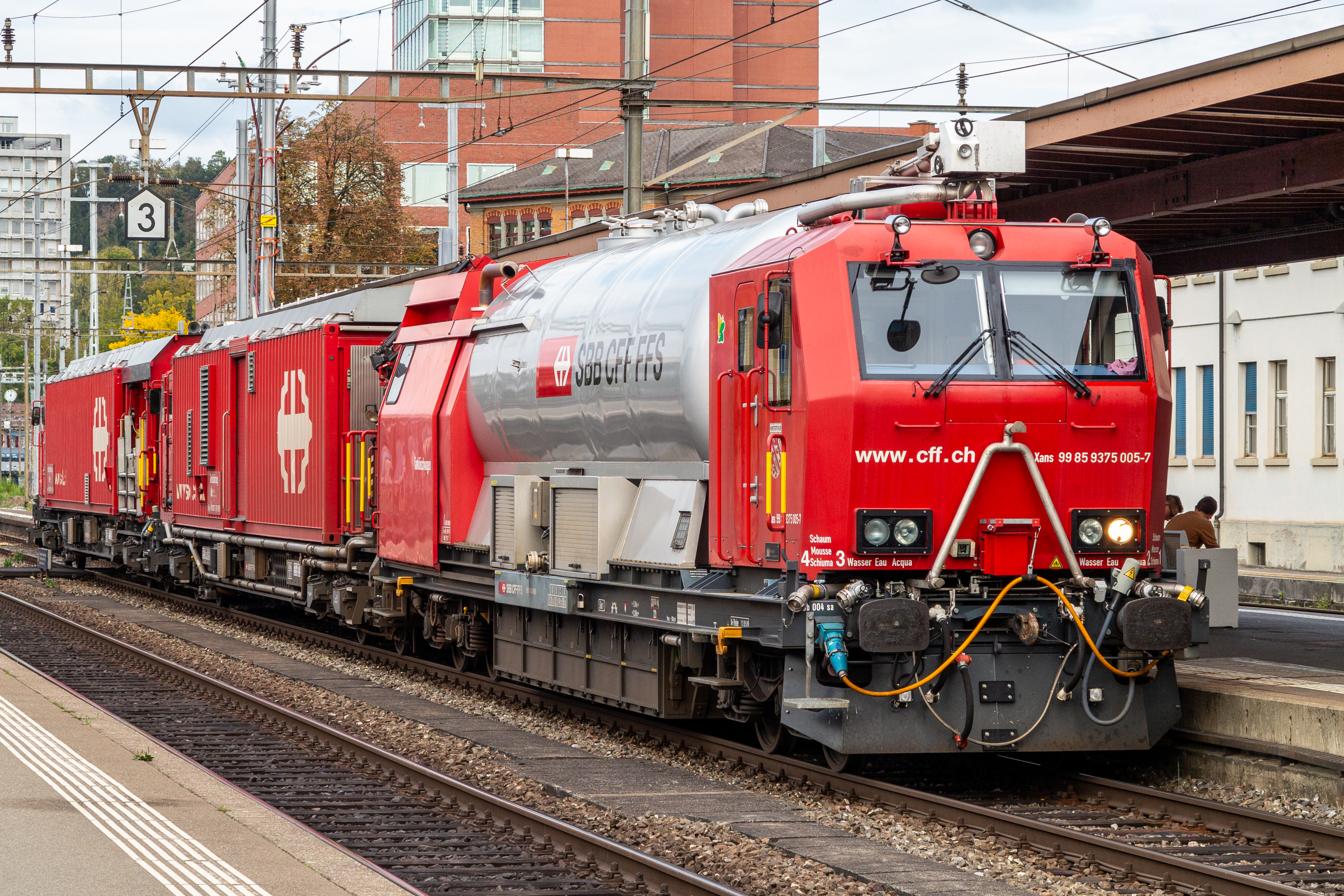
Tunnel Firefighting and Rescue Train in Switzerland

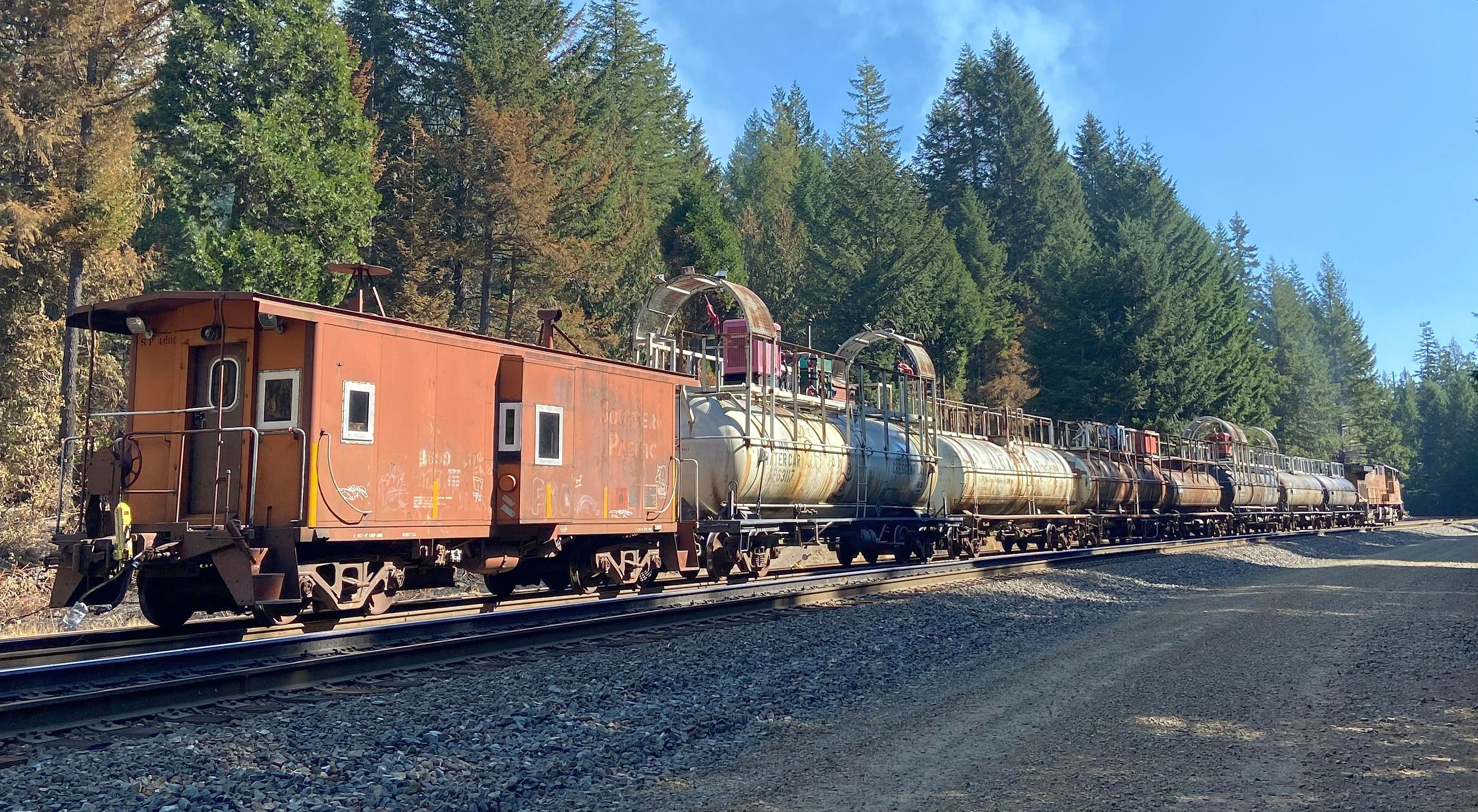
Fire train at Cedar Creek Fire in Oregon, United States

A fire train is a train that is designed to fight fires. Because in many areas along railroads, road access is limited or unavailable, railroads maintain fire trains to respond to fires on or near railroad rights of way.

The primary purpose of a fire train is to protect the railroad's property and right of way. However, when fire trains respond to wildfires near railroads, they allow for firefighters to concentrate their efforts on other portions of a fire.

Special tunnel rescue trains are prepared for firefighting and have capacity to evacuate people out of tunnels. They are part of the safety concepts for long railway tunnels.

== History ==
Early accounts of fire trains date to the beginning of the 20th century. In 1908, a fire train was reported to have saved the village of Long Lake West and its inhabitants in the Adirondack Park of New York from being destroyed by a wildfire with 15 minutes to spare.

== Operations ==
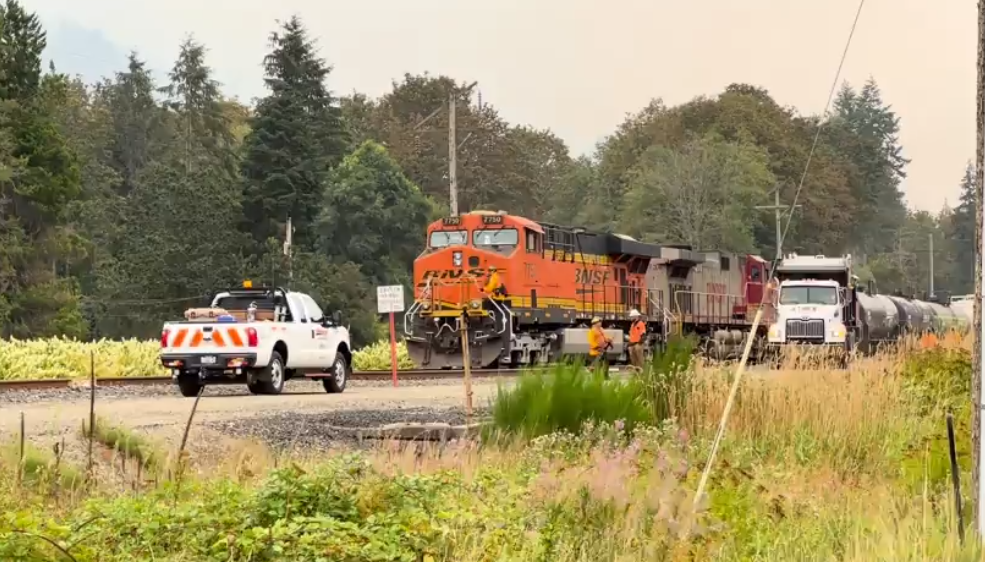
BNSF fire train at Gold Bar, Washington, 2022

Fire trains are used to respond to fires which are on or near railroad lines. A fire train can carry large quantities of water – BNSF Railway's fire trains have a capacity of over 30,000 gallons of water, compared to a typical fire engine which carries around 500 gallons. A typical fire train will include several tank cars filled with water or firefighting foam, along with water cannons which can spray anywhere from 30 to 150 feet away from the tracks, both to preemptively wet down flammable materials and to suppress fires. Some fire trains are also capable of refilling their water supply from nearby bodies of water by using siphons.

While fire trains are owned by railway companies, not municipal authorities typically responsible for firefighting, railroads often coordinate and work with firefighters, such as by using fire trains' water storage to provide water to firefighters. As the trains include crew accommodations, railroads may also use them to transport firefighters to and from fires, which often occur in rural areas with poor road access.
