= Long Lake, New York =

- Town
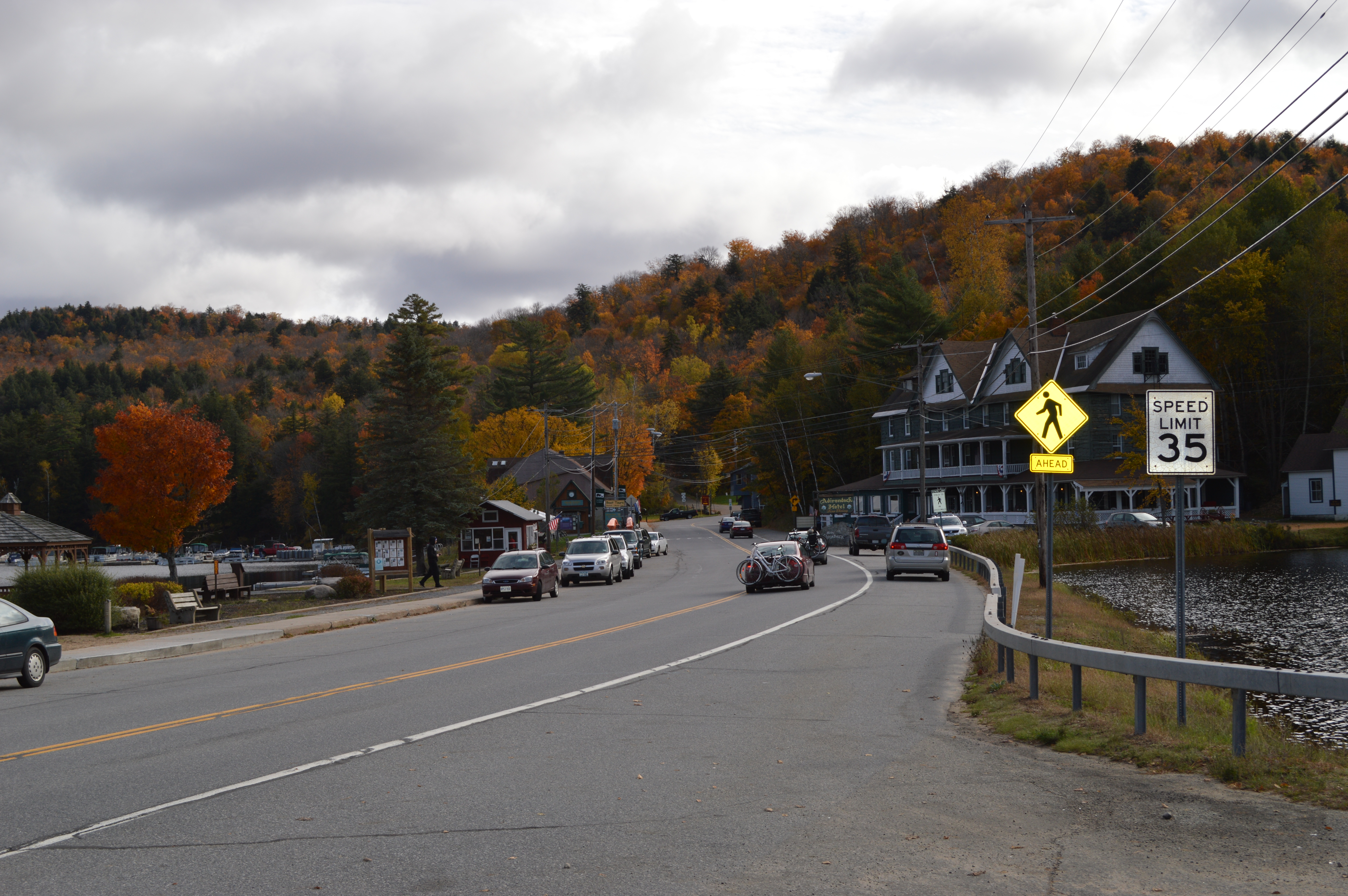
- The hamlet of Long Lake approaching on N.Y. Route 30 from the bridge.

- Location in Hamilton County and the state of New York.

- Location within the state of New York
- Coordinates: 43°58′20″N 74°25′15″W
- Country: United States
- State: New York
- County: Hamilton

Government
  - Type: Town Board
  - Town Supervisor: Clay Arsenault
  - Town Board: Members' List: • Dean H. Pohl (R); • Richard B. Dechene (R); • Clark Seaman (R); • Thomas Donnelly (R)

Area
  - Total: 449.84 sq mi (1,165.07 km^{2})
  - Land: 407.03 sq mi (1,054.21 km^{2})
  - Water: 42.80 sq mi (110.86 km^{2}) 9.51%
- Elevation: 1,906 ft (581 m)

Population (2020)
  - Total: 791
  - Density: 1.94/sq mi (0.750/km^{2})
- Time zone: UTC-5 (Eastern (EST))
  - Summer (DST): UTC-4 (EDT)
- ZIP Codes: 12847 (Long Lake); 13436 (Raquette Lake)
- Area code: 518
- FIPS code: 36-041-43412
- GNIS feature ID: 979168
- Website: www.mylonglake.com

Long Lake is a town in Hamilton County, New York, United States. The population was 791 at the 2020 census.

The town is named for 14-mile-long (23 km) Long Lake, beside which it sits. A census designated place bearing the same name sits within Long Lake, home to 596 of the town's 791 inhabitants. The town is entirely within the Adirondack Park and is the northernmost town in the county. It is a summer tourism destination offering fishing, hiking, boating and swimming. In the winter months, snowmobiling is also popular. Long Lake is the home of the historic Adirondack Hotel. Long Lake is also noted for being home to Sabattis Scout Reservation, a long-term camp operated by the Longhouse Council, Boy Scouts of America.

== History ==
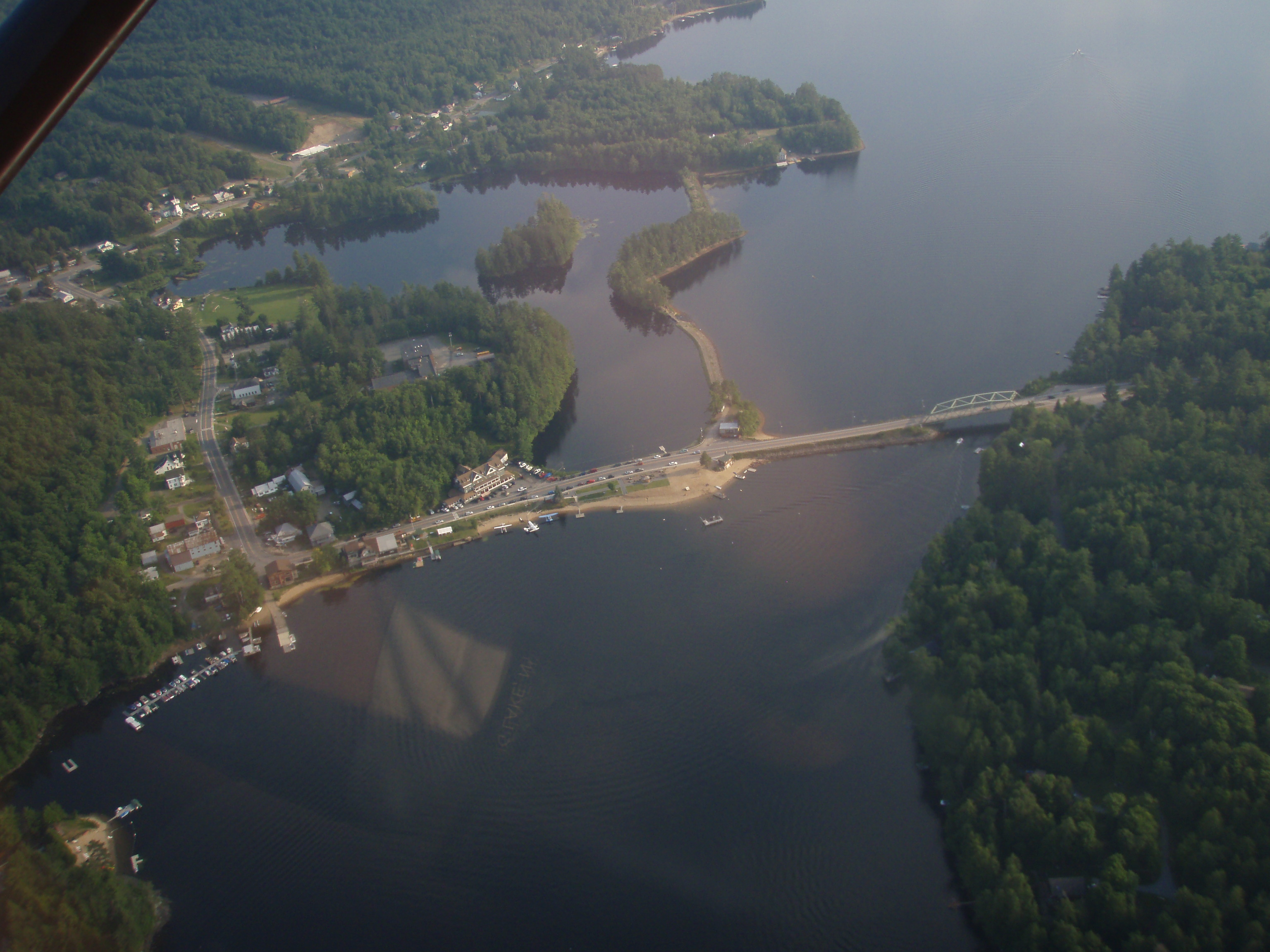
The hamlet of Long Lake from the air

The town was settled circa 1833 by Joel Plumley, a native of Vermont.

The town of Long Lake was formed in 1837 from sections of the towns of Arietta, Morehouse, Lake Pleasant, and Wells. In 1861, the town was increased by additions from Arietta, Lake Pleasant, and Morehouse.

Long Lake is part of the 1.1 million acres (4,500 km^{2}) acquired from the Mohawk nation as part of the 1771 Totten and Crossfield Purchase. Long Lake is a glacial widening of the Raquette River and is part of the water route that connects the Fulton Chain Lakes with the Saint Lawrence River drainage. This route was frequently traveled by guideboat in the mid-late 19th century. At that time, "a typical trip might start at the Saranacs from which a party could make its way to the Raquette River via Indian Carry and Stoney Creek." The trip continued "via the lakes accessible from it— Long, Raquette, Forked, Blue and Tupper." Settled by the 1830s, Long Lake was isolated, except by water, until William Seward Webb's Mohawk and Malone Railway was built through what was then known as Long Lake West in 1892. Long Lake and Long Lake West were connected by a stage route. The Mohawk & Malone Railway was taken over by the New York Central and Hudson River Railroad in 1894, and was merged into the New York Central Railroad in 1913. Passenger rail service on the NYC ended on April 24, 1965. The town of Long Lake West was later renamed Sabattis, after Peter Sabattis and his son Mitchell Sabattis, the Abenaki Indian guides who came down from Canada and first settled in this area, followed by a long line of their offspring and family.

Long Lake West was the site of a fire that destroyed most of the town in 1908, doing 130,000 dollars of damage. A fire train arrived and saved the inhabitants with 15 minutes to spare.

Long Lake is the starting point of the Roosevelt-Marcy Trail. On September 14, 1901 Theodore Roosevelt was climbing Mount Marcy when he got word that President William McKinley, who had been shot two weeks before in Buffalo, but had been expected to improve, had taken a serious turn for the worse.

Roosevelt rushed down 10 miles (16 km) from his campsite at Lake Tear of the Clouds to the closest town and telephone, which was outside of Newcomb, approximately 15 miles (24 km) east of Long Lake. From there he took a legendary midnight stagecoach ride to the closest train station 26 miles (42 km) to the south, at North Creek, where he learned that McKinley had died. Roosevelt was sworn in at Buffalo.

== Geography ==
Long Lake is located in northern Hamilton County at 43°58′18″N 074°35′10″W (43.9717408, -74.5862453) and its elevation is 1,906 feet (581 m). It is bordered to the west by Herkimer County, to the north by St. Lawrence and Franklin counties, and to the east by Essex County.

According to the 2010 United States census, the town has a total area of 449.837 square miles (1,165.07 km^{2}), of which 407.033 square miles (1,054.21 km^{2}) is land and 42.804 square miles (110.86 km^{2}) is water.

The town is in the Adirondack Park. It is the second-largest town in land area in New York (after Webb in Herkimer County). The town of Long Lake extends approximately 25 miles (40 km) east to west and up to 12 miles (19 km) north to south. The town extends across the northern part of the county.

New York State Route 30, a north–south highway, intersects New York State Route 28N at Long Lake village. NY-28N and NY-30 run conjoined through part of Long Lake. New York State Route 28 is an east–west highway in the southwestern part of the town.

The body of water known as Long Lake is about 14 miles (23 km) long and up to 1-mile (1.6 km) wide. The lake extends from southwest to northeast and is part of the Raquette River system. The Raquette flows into Long Lake at the southwestern end and out the northeastern end, ultimately emptying into the St. Lawrence River.

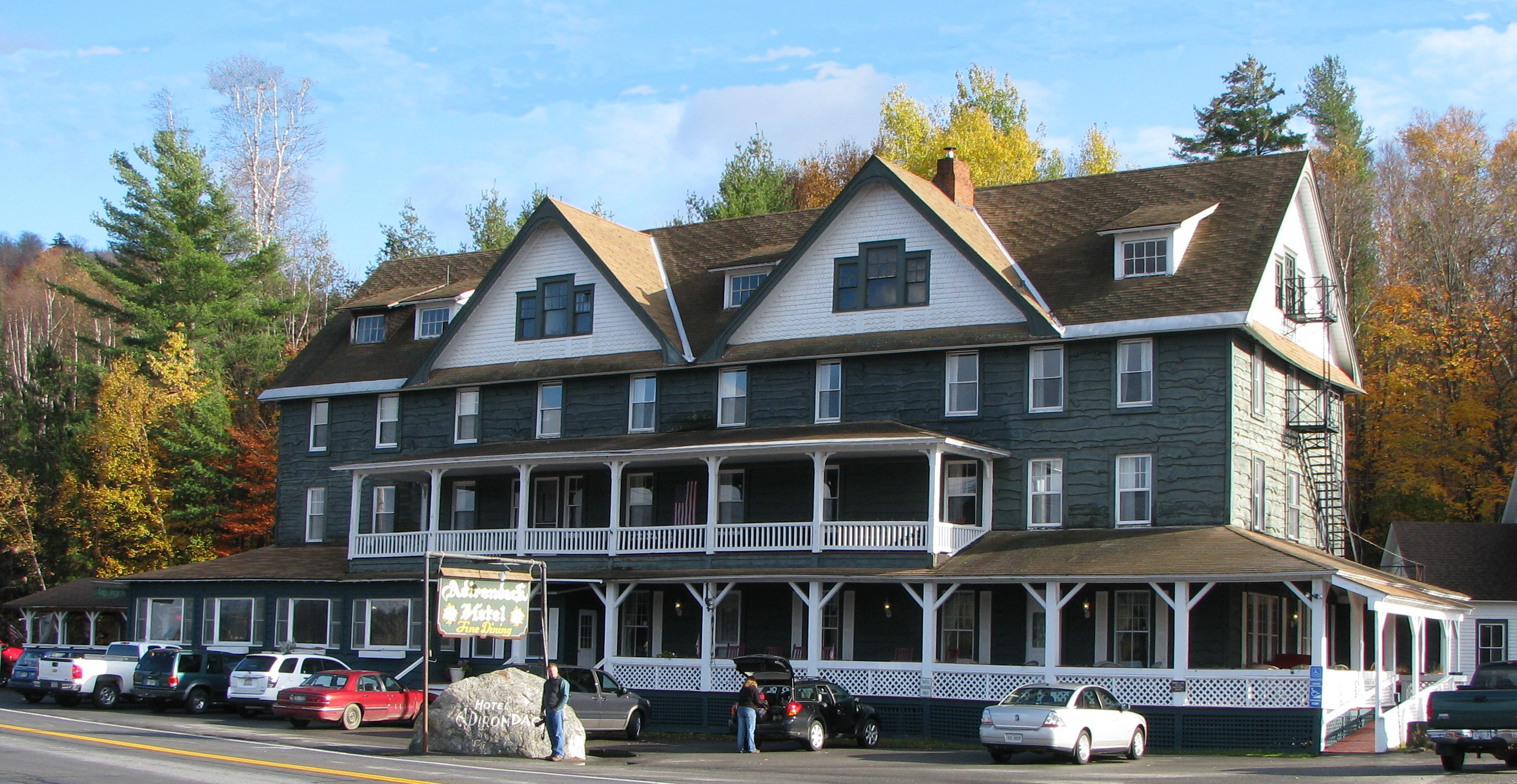
The Adirondack Hotel

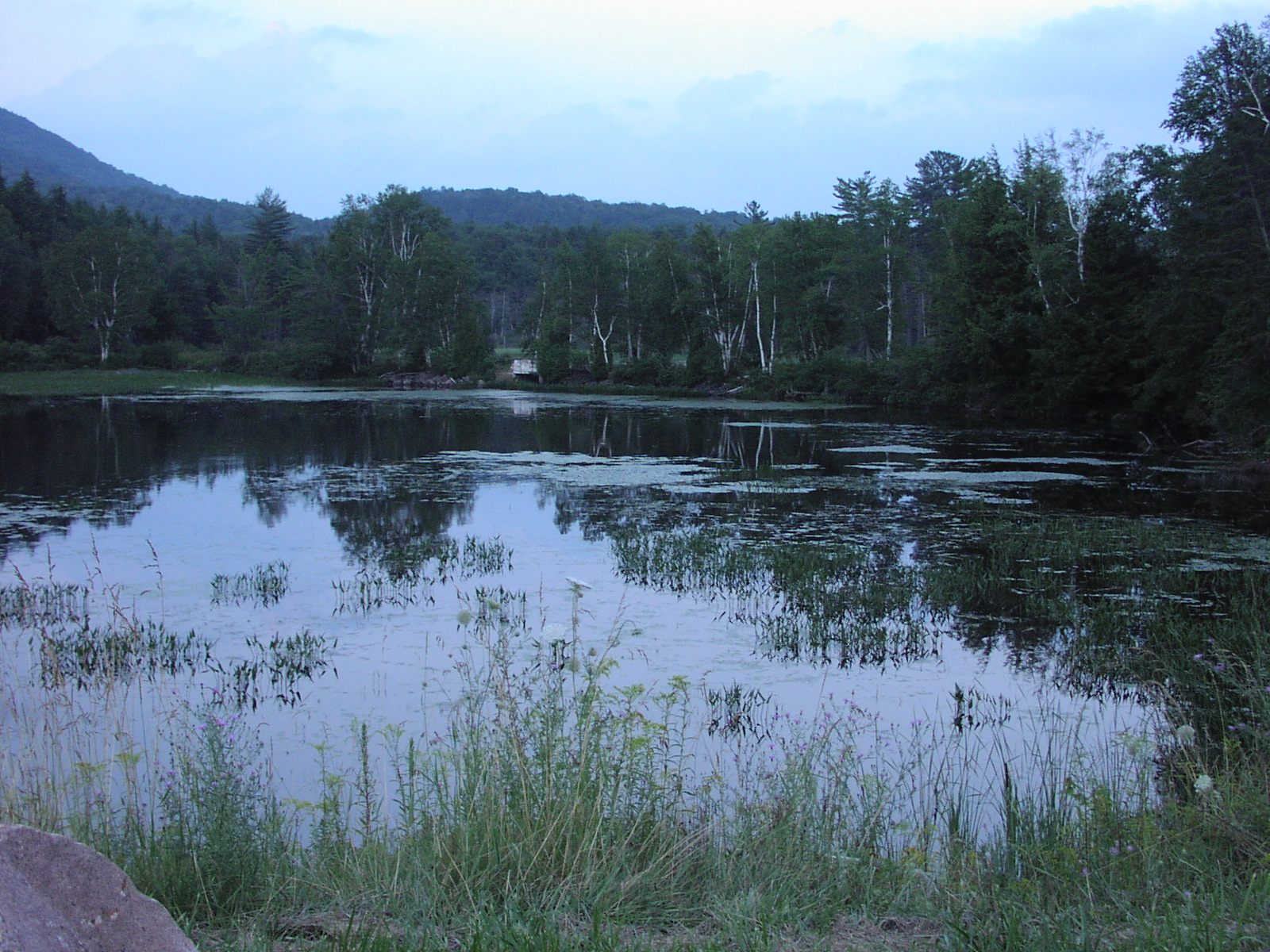
The Mill Pond

== Demographics ==
Historical population
Census	Pop.	Note	%±
1840	59		—
1850	111		88.1%
1860	223		100.9%
1870	280		25.6%
1880	324		15.7%
1890	580		79.0%
1900	1,023		76.4%
1910	1,149		12.3%
1920	1,116		−2.9%
1930	1,038		−7.0%
1940	943		−9.2%
1950	896		−5.0%
1960	896		0.0%
1970	900		0.4%
1980	935		3.9%
1990	930		−0.5%
2000	852		−8.4%
2010	711		−16.5%
2020	791		11.3%
U.S. Decennial Census

As of the census of 2000, there were 852 people, 387 households, and 236 families residing in the town. The population density was 2.1 people per square mile (0.81 people/km^{2}). There were 1,496 housing units at an average density of 3.7 units per square mile (1.4 units/km^{2}). The racial makeup of the town was 97.42% White, 0.59% African American, 0.35% Native American, 0.23% Asian, 0.12% Pacific Islander, 0.23% from other races, and 1.06% from two or more races. Hispanic or Latino of any race were 1.06% of the population.

There were 387 households, out of which 21.7% had children under the age of 18 living with them, 52.2% were married couples living together, 6.2% had a female householder with no husband present, and 38.8% were non-families. 31.5% of all households were made up of individuals, and 14.7% had someone living alone who was 65 years of age or older. The average household size was 2.14 and the average family size was 2.68.

In the town, the age distribution of the population shows 18.4% under the age of 18, 4.2% from 18 to 24, 22.3% from 25 to 44, 35.3% from 45 to 64, and 19.7% who were 65 years of age or older. The median age was 47 years. For every 100 females, there were 100.9 males. For every 100 females age 18 and over, there were 104.4 males.

The median income for a household in the town was $29,583, and the median income for a family was $44,583. Males had a median income of $29,141 versus $21,429 for females. The per capita income for the town was $19,466. About 9.9% of families and 15.6% of the population were below the poverty line, including 17.7% of those under age 18 and 13.2% of those age 65 or over.

== Communities and locations ==
=== Inhabited places ===
Long Lake, NY logo

- Deerland – Originally called "Grove," this hamlet is at the southeastern end of Long Lake on NY-28N/NY-30.
- Deerland Camp – A location on Little Forked Lake.
- Golden Beach – A location on the eastern side of Raquette Lake by the town line.
- Hasbroucks – A hamlet, also called "Hasbrooks," located on the northern shore of Raquette Lake at Outlet Bay.
- Long Lake – The census-designated place (CDP) of Long Lake, near the intersection of Routes NY-28N and NY-30 and near the middle section of the lake, also called the Hamlet of Long Lake and Long Lake.
- Nehesane – An uninhabited location in the northwestern part of the town by Lake Lila, formerly owned by William Seward Webb.
- Partlow – A location southwest of Lake Lila.
- Raquette Lake – A hamlet on the western shore of Raquette Lake and also on NY-28.
- Robinwood – A location in the northwestern corner of the town, southwest of Sabbitis.
- Sabattis – An abandoned hamlet on the northern town line of Long Lake, originally called, "Long Lake West". Some of this property is known as "Sabattis Scout Reservation" and is used as a week-long summer camp for the Boy Scouts of America through most of July and August.
- Sagamore – A location by the southern town line.
- Whitney Headquarters – A location in the northern part of the town on Little Tupper Lake.
- Woods – A location northeast of Raquette Lake.

=== Geographic features ===
- Beaver River – A river flowing out the western side of the town to Lake Lila.
- Big Island – An island in Raquette Lake.
- Bluff Point – A peninsula defining part of Outlet Bay in Raquette Lake.
- Brandreth Lake – A lake north of Raquette Lake.
- Catlin Lake – A lake at the eastern town line. Owned by SUNY-ESF.
- Chub Lake – A lake located west of Raquette Lake.
- Cranberry Pond – A lake located northwest of the hamlet of Raquette Lake.
- Forked Lake – A lake northeast of Woods by the southern town line.
- High Pond – A small pond located on the northern town line, north of Little Tupper Lake.
- Indian Point – A peninsula on the western side of Raquette Lake.
- Lake Eaton – A lake west of Long Lake hamlet and Long Lake.
- Lake Lila – A lake in the northwest of Long Lake, forming the headwaters of the Beaver River.
- Little Forked Lake – A small lake north of Forked Lake by Deerland Camp.
- Little Tupper Lake – A large lake in the northern part of the town.
- Lows Lake – A lake at the northern town line, west of Sabbitis.
- Long Lake – A large lake with a northeast to southwest orientation in the northeastern part of the town, with the hamlet of Long Lake near its southern end.
- Long Lake Town Beach – The town beach of Long Lake. It is home to the Helms Aero Service, a company which offers seaplane rides with views of the Adirondacks.
- Long Point – A peninsula on the eastern side of Raquette Lake.
- Lower Sister Lake – A lake northwest of Raquette Lake.
- Mays Pond – A pond located west of Chub Lake.
- Mohegan Lake – A lake located south of Raquette Lake.
- Nehasane Lake – A lake by the western town line on the Beaver River.
- Negro Lake – A lake southwest of Partlow Mountain.
- Outlet Bay – The northwestern part of Raquette Lake.
- Pelcher Pond – A lake located west of the hamlet of Raquette Lake.
- Queer Lake – A lake located east of the hamlet of Raquette Lake.
- Raquette Lake – A large lake in the western part of the town. It is the fourth largest lake in the Adirondack region.
- Round Lake – A lake in the northern part of Long Lake, north of Whitney Headquarters.
- Russian Lake – A lake located west of the hamlet of Raquette Lake.
- Sagamore Lake – A lake located south of Raquette Lake.
- Shallow Lake – A lake located west of the hamlet of Raquette Lake.
- South Pond – A lake located south of Deerland.
- Upper Sister Lake – A lake located northwest of Raquette Lake.
