= Long Lake (Hamilton County, New York) =

Lake in Hamilton County, New York, United States

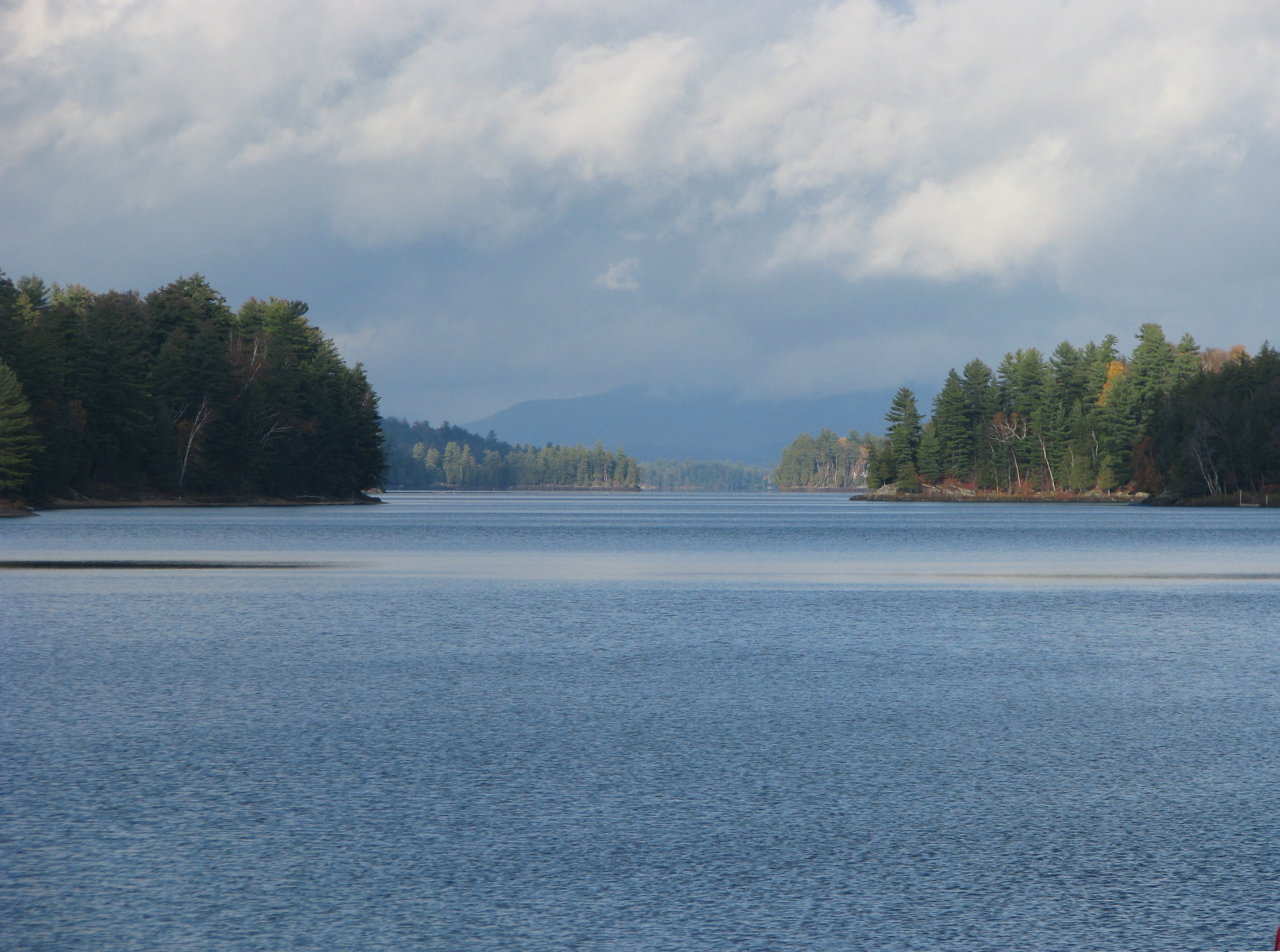
- Long Lake, looking north from NY 30

- Location within New York Location within the United States
- Location: Adirondacks, Hamilton County, New York
- Coordinates: 43°58′22″N 74°25′16″W
- Primary inflows: Raquette River
- Primary outflows: Raquette River
- Basin countries: United States
- Max. length: 14 mi (23 km)
- Max. width: 1 mi (1.6 km)
- Surface area: 4,077 acres (16.50 km^{2})
- Surface elevation: 1,629 ft (497 m)
- Islands: 9 Pine Island; Moose Island; Round Island; Camp Islands; Island House
- Settlements: Long Lake, New York (hamlet)

The 4,077 acres (16.50 km^{2}) Long Lake is a 14-mile (23 km) lake in the town of Long Lake in Hamilton County, New York in the United States; the average width is half a mile. It is part of the Raquette River, which flows through a straight, northeast-trending valley. NY 30 crosses at a narrow section 4 miles (6.4 km) from the south end, where the hamlet of Long Lake is located. There are two public beaches and a state boat launch. More than half of the shoreline is within the New York State Forest preserve. The northern end of the lake is undeveloped. The lake is also part of the 740-mile Northern Forest Canoe Trail, which begins in Old Forge, NY and ends in Fort Kent, ME. The Long Lake Camp for the Arts is based on the west side of the lake.

== History ==
Settled by the 1830s, Long Lake was isolated, except by water, until the New York Central Railroad extended a spur to Sabbatis at the north town line. The area was frequented by sportsmen and tourists, and the earliest settlers were hunting guides and boat builders. Long Lake was part of a water route that connected the Fulton Chain Lakes with the Saint Lawrence River drainage. This route was frequently traveled by guideboat or canoe in the mid-late 19th century. At that time, "a typical trip might start at the Saranacs, from which a party could make its way to the Raquette River via Indian Carry and Stoney Creek." The trip continued "via the lakes accessible from it— Long, Raquette, Forked, Blue and Tupper."

U.S. Senator Orville H. Platt had a summer camp on Long Lake in the 19th century.

In 1925 Ephraim Sklyansky, CEO of Amtorg Trading Corporation (an unofficial representative office of the USSR in the US) and Leon Trotsky's right hand, died on Long Lake in a boating accident with his colleague Isai Khurgin, the previous director of Amtorg. The accident was suspected to be a murder organized by GPU, the secret police of the Russian Socialist Federative Soviet Republic.

There was once a proposal to link Long Lake with the Hudson River by way of a canal, which was started but abandoned.

Long Lake is the setting of the 2020 film, Black Bear, starring Aubrey Plaza.

== See also ==
- Adirondack Canoe Classic
- Northern Forest Canoe Trail

== Sources ==
- Jamieson, Paul and Morris, Donald, Adirondack Canoe Waters, North Flow, Lake George, NY: Adirondack Mountain Club, 1987. ISBN 0-935272-43-7.
