= West Mountain (Hamilton County, New York) =

Mountain located in Adirondack Mountains of New York

- Location within New York Adirondack Park Location within the United States

Highest point
- Elevation: 2,923 feet (891 m)
- Coordinates: 43°51′36″N 74°42′22″W

Geography
- Location: NW of Raquette Lake, Hamilton County, New York, U.S.
- Topo map: USGS Raquette Lake

West Mountain is a 2,923-foot-tall (891 m) mountain located in Adirondack Mountains of New York. It is located in the northwest of the hamlet of Raquette Lake in Hamilton County. In 1920, the Conservation Commission built a 47-foot-tall (14 m) fire lookout tower on the mountain. Due to aerial detection, the tower ceased fire lookout operations at the end of the 1970 season. The tower was later removed, and portions of the tower along with the tower from Kempshall Mountain were used to build the tower that is at the Essex County Historical Museum in Elizabethtown.

== History ==
The first structure built on the mountain was a 14-foot-tall (4.3 m) wooden signal tower built for the 1899 United States Geological Survey. In 1909, William Wing Sanderson served as a Forest Fire Observer on West Mountain for the New York Forest, Fish and Game Commission and recorded his experience in a detailed diary. In 1920, the Conservation Commission (CC) replaced the original tower with a 47-foot-tall (14 m) Aermotor LS40 tower. The CC hired local woodsman and guide Billy Payne and his ox Tommy to transport the steel from the railroad station in Raquette Lake to the mountain. Due to aerial detection which was better, the tower ceased fire lookout operations at the end of the 1970 season. The tower was later removed because of this and also because it was deemed a "non-conforming" structure in the newly established Pigeon Lake Wilderness Area. Portions of the tower along with the tower from Kempshall Mountain were used to build the tower that is at the Essex County Historical Museum in Elizabethtown.
