= Queer Lake =

- Location within New York Queer Lake (the United States)
- Location: Hamilton County, New York, United States
- Coordinates: 43°48′40″N 74°47′55″W
- Type: Lake
- Primary outflows: Sucker Brook
- Basin countries: United States
- Surface area: 117 acres (0.47 km^{2})
- Average depth: 16 feet (4.9 m)
- Max. depth: 71 feet (22 m)
- Shore length^{1}: 3.7 miles (6.0 km)
- Surface elevation: 1,959 feet (597 m)
- Settlements: Raquette Lake, New York
- ^{1} Shore length is not a well-defined measure.

Queer Lake is a natural lake in Hamilton County, New York, in the United States. The lake was so named on account of its unusual shape.

== Fishing ==
Fish species present in the lake are black bullhead, brook trout, white sucker and pumpkinseed sunfish. There is trail access on the north and west shore. No motors are allowed on this lake.

== See also ==
- List of lakes in New York
