= Pelcher Pond =

- Location within New York Pelcher Pond (the United States)
- Location: Hamilton County, New York, United States
- Coordinates: 43°49′37″N 74°42′49″W
- Type: Lake
- Basin countries: United States
- Surface area: 44 acres (0.18 km^{2})
- Average depth: 5 feet (1.5 m)
- Max. depth: 11 feet (3.4 m)
- Shore length^{1}: 1.3 miles (2.1 km)
- Surface elevation: 1,804 feet (550 m)
- Settlements: Raquette Lake, New York
- ^{1} Shore length is not a well-defined measure.

Pelcher Pond is located west of Raquette Lake, New York. The outlet creek flows into Shallow Lake. Fish species present in the pond are brook trout and sunfish. There is access by trail from Shallow Lake. No motors are allowed on the pond.
