= Lake Eaton =

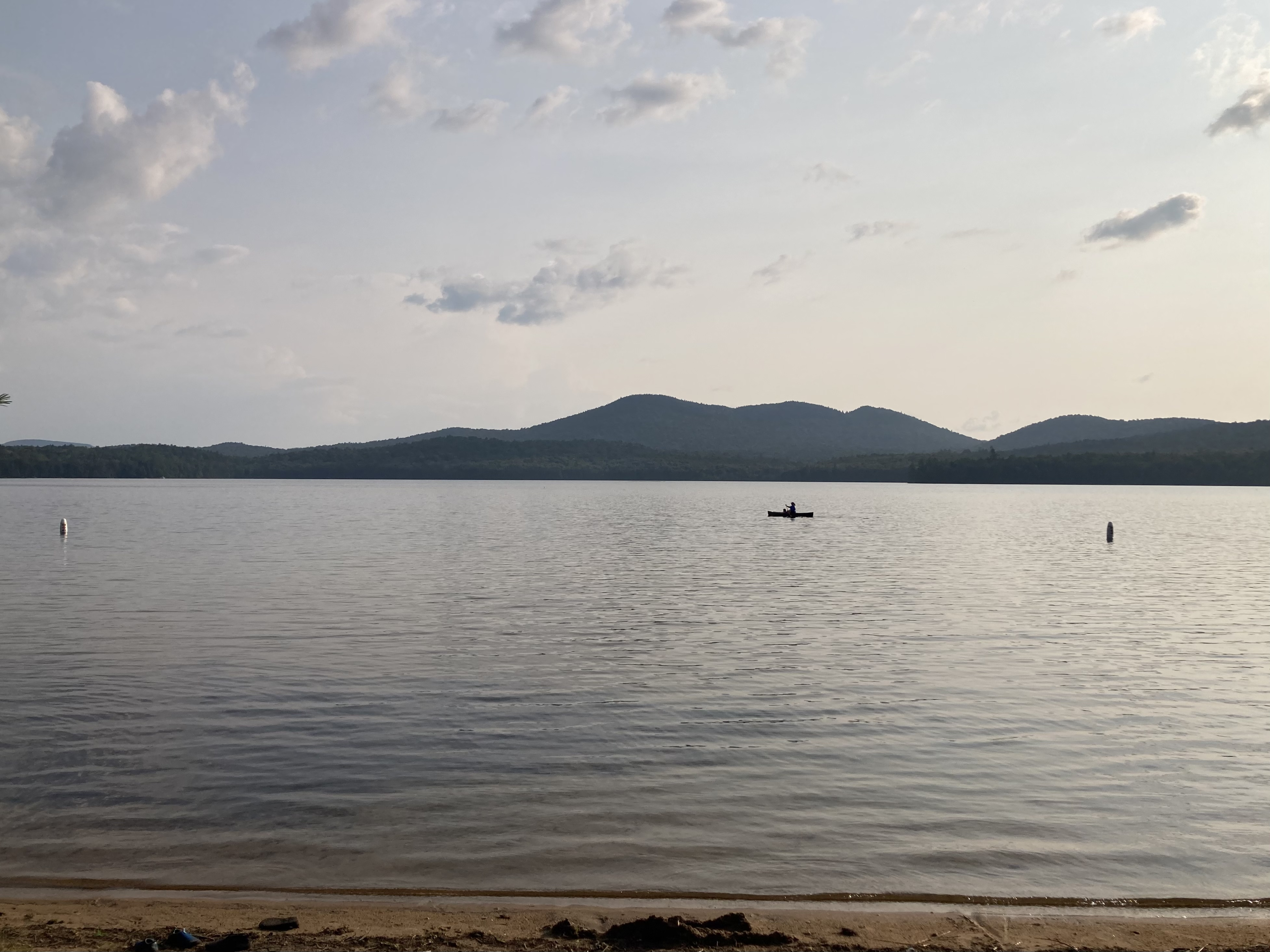
- Lake Eaton with Owls Head Mountain to the south behind it.

- Location within New York Lake Eaton (the United States)
- Location: Hamilton County, New York, United States
- Coordinates: 43°58′44″N 74°27′59″W
- Type: Lake
- Basin countries: United States
- Surface area: 574 acres (2.32 km^{2})
- Average depth: 26 feet (7.9 m)
- Max. depth: 56 feet (17 m)
- Shore length^{1}: 4.8 miles (7.7 km)
- Surface elevation: 1,716 feet (523 m)
- Settlements: Long Lake, New York
- ^{1} Shore length is not a well-defined measure.

Lake Eaton is located west of Long Lake, New York. Fish species present in the lake are brook trout, lake trout, lake whitefish, smallmouth bass, landlocked salmon, brown trout, and rainbow trout. There is a state owned beach launch located in the campground on Route 30, 2 miles west of Long Lake.
