= Cranberry Pond (Long Lake, Hamilton County, New York) =

- Location within New York Cranberry Pond (the United States)
- Location: Hamilton County, New York, United States
- Coordinates: 43°50′22″N 74°42′06″W
- Type: Lake
- Primary inflows: Sucker Brook
- Primary outflows: Sucker Brook
- Basin countries: United States
- Surface area: 27 acres (0.11 km^{2})
- Average depth: 5 feet (1.5 m)
- Max. depth: 8 feet (2.4 m)
- Shore length^{1}: 1.2 miles (1.9 km)
- Surface elevation: 1,801 feet (549 m)
- Settlements: Raquette Lake, New York
- ^{1} Shore length is not a well-defined measure.

Cranberry Pond is located northwest of Raquette Lake, New York. Fish species present in the pond are brook trout, brown trout, white sucker, sunfish and black bullhead. There is access by trail from Brown Tract Road. No motors are allowed on the pond.
