= Mays Pond (New York) =

- Location within New York Mays Pond (the United States)
- Location: Hamilton County, New York
- Coordinates: 43°49′21″N 74°48′53″W
- Type: Lake
- Basin countries: United States
- Surface area: 32 acres (0.13 km^{2})
- Average depth: 6 feet (1.8 m)
- Max. depth: 17 feet (5.2 m)
- Shore length^{1}: 1 mile (1.6 km)
- Surface elevation: 1,896 feet (578 m)
- Settlements: Raquette Lake, New York
- ^{1} Shore length is not a well-defined measure.

Mays Pond is a lake located west of Raquette Lake, New York. Fish species present in the lake are black bullhead, and sunfish. There is trail access on the east shore. The west shore is privately owned. No motors are allowed on this pond.
