= South Pond (Hamilton County, New York) =

Lake in Hamilton County, New York, United States

- Location within New York South Pond (the United States)
- Location: Hamilton County, New York, United States
- Coordinates: 43°54′50.55″N 74°27′10.50″W
- Primary inflows: East Inlet Brook, Mud Pond Outlet
- Primary outflows: South Pond Outlet
- Basin countries: United States
- Surface area: 428 acres (1.73 km^{2})
- Average depth: 25 feet (7.6 m)
- Max. depth: 55 feet (17 m)
- Shore length^{1}: 5.2 miles (8.4 km)
- Surface elevation: 1,767 feet (539 m)
- Islands: 12
- Settlements: Deerland, New York
- ^{1} Shore length is not a well-defined measure.

South Pond is a lake located south of Deerland, New York. Fish species present in the lake are brook trout, lake trout, splake, smallmouth bass, landlocked salmon, black bullhead, and yellow perch. There is a carry down launch located on NY-30 on the northeast shore.
