= Mohegan Lake (Mount Tom, Hamilton County, New York) =

- Location within New York Mohegan Lake (the United States)
- Location: Hamilton County, New York, United States
- Coordinates: 43°44′37″N 74°39′13″W
- Type: Lake
- Basin countries: United States
- Surface area: 117 acres (0.47 km^{2})
- Average depth: 23 feet (7.0 m)
- Max. depth: 58 feet (18 m)
- Shore length^{1}: 2.2 miles (3.5 km)
- Surface elevation: 2,021 feet (616 m)
- Settlements: Raquette Lake, New York
- ^{1} Shore length is not a well-defined measure.

Mohegan Lake is located south of Raquette Lake, New York. Fish species present in the lake are brook trout, lake trout, white sucker, landlocked salmon, black bullhead, yellow perch, and sunfish. There is trail access off Sagamore Road until 3/26/2022 when Bear Pond Club will remove road barriers and fulfill their agreement with the NYSDEC to allow vehicular traffic to enter.
