= Adirondack Hotel =

Hotel in Long Lake, New York, US

Coordinates: 43°58′26.3″N 74°25′21.2″W

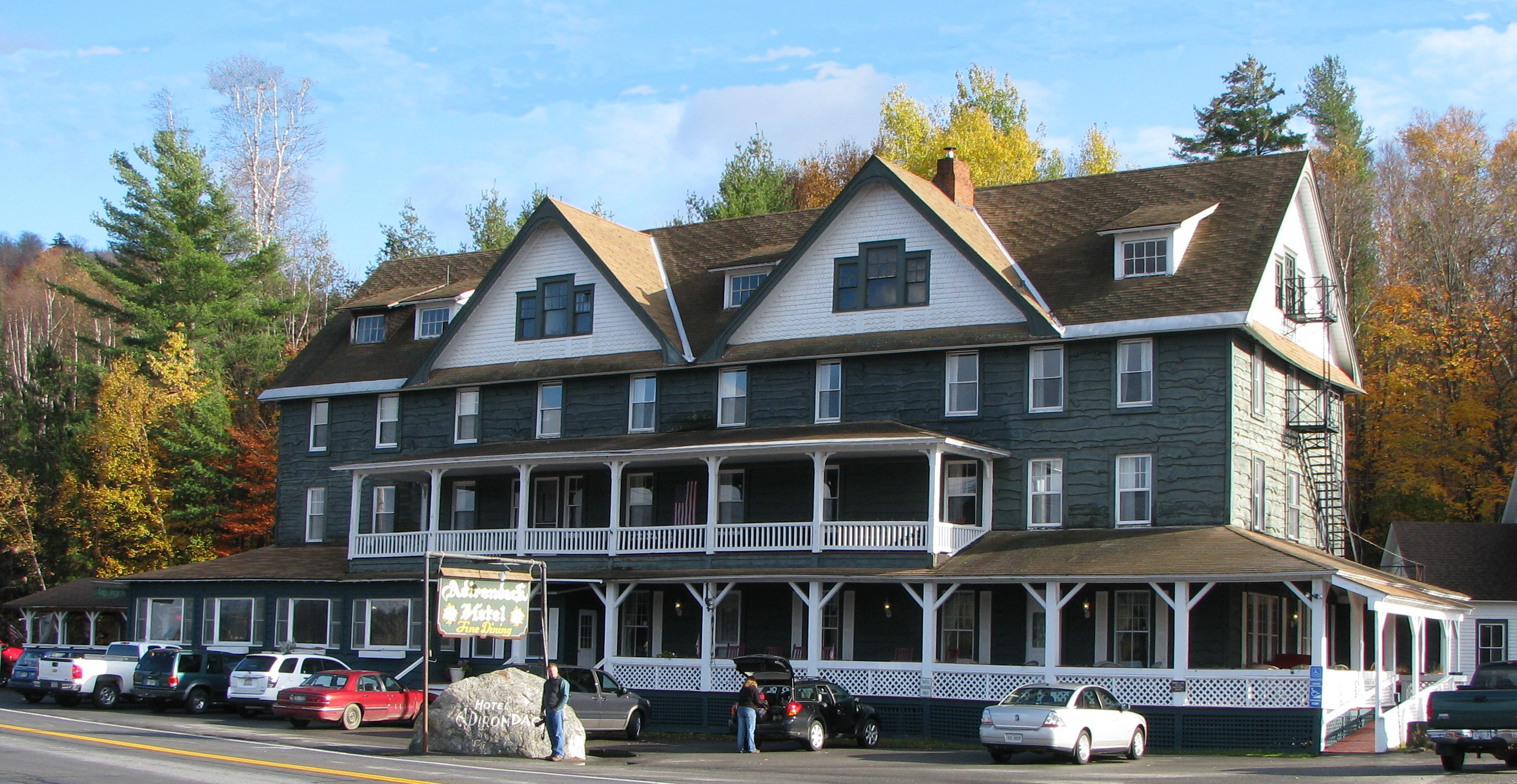
Adirondack Hotel

Adirondack Hotel is a hotel in Long Lake, New York, located on New York State Route 30 in the hamlet of Long Lake. The existing hotel was built c. 1901 to replace the Lake House, a hotel built 1878–79 that burned in 1901. It was erected by Patrick Moynehan, a businessman from Glens Falls.

The hotel was sold to the Jennings family of Long Lake in 1914 and ownership was transferred at subsequent points in 1924 and later. More recently, the hotel's exterior was re-surfaced with live edge siding. It is considered a good example of a midsize hotel once more common in the Adirondacks.

== Gallery ==
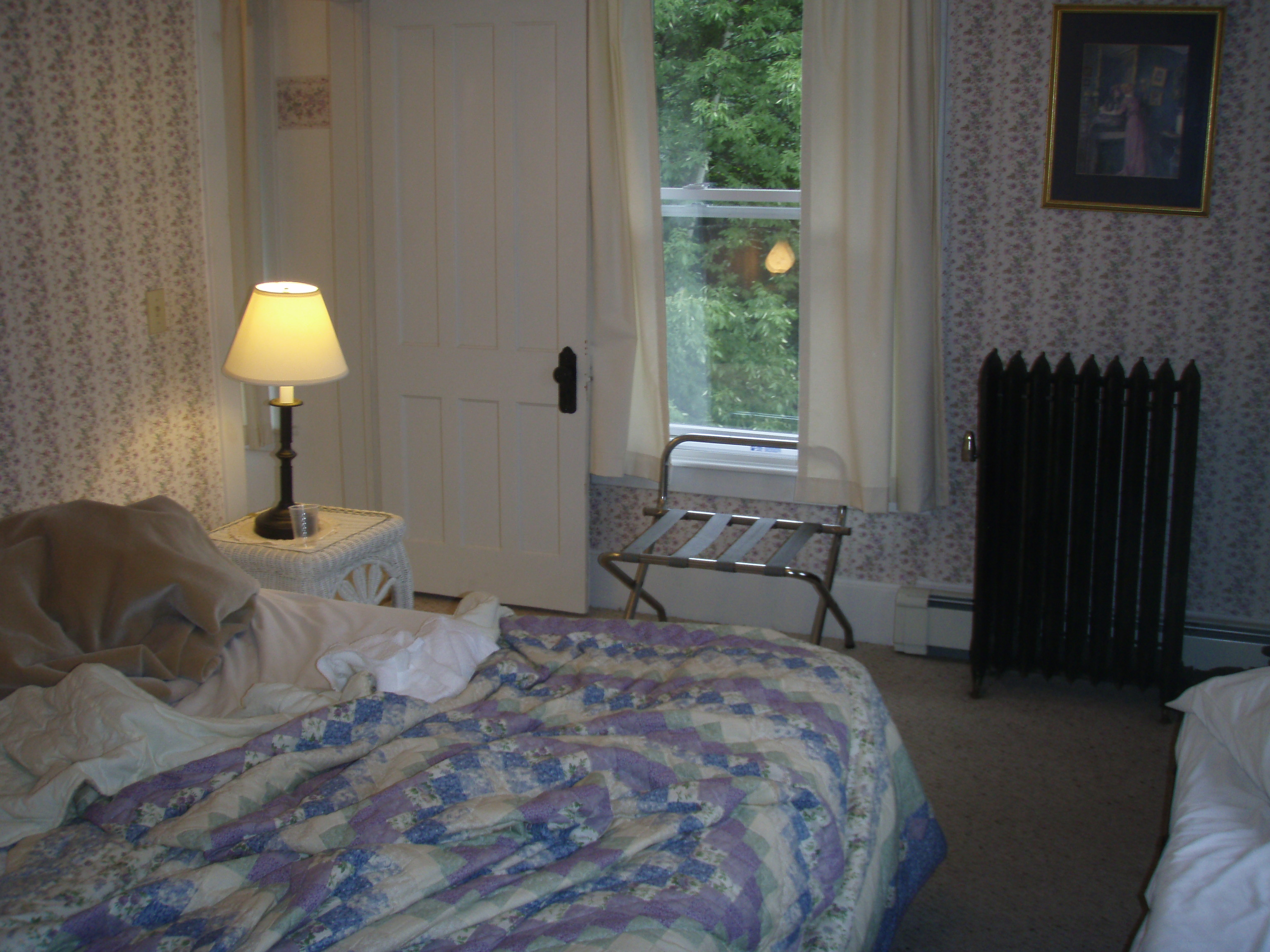
One of the rooms in the Adirondack Hotel

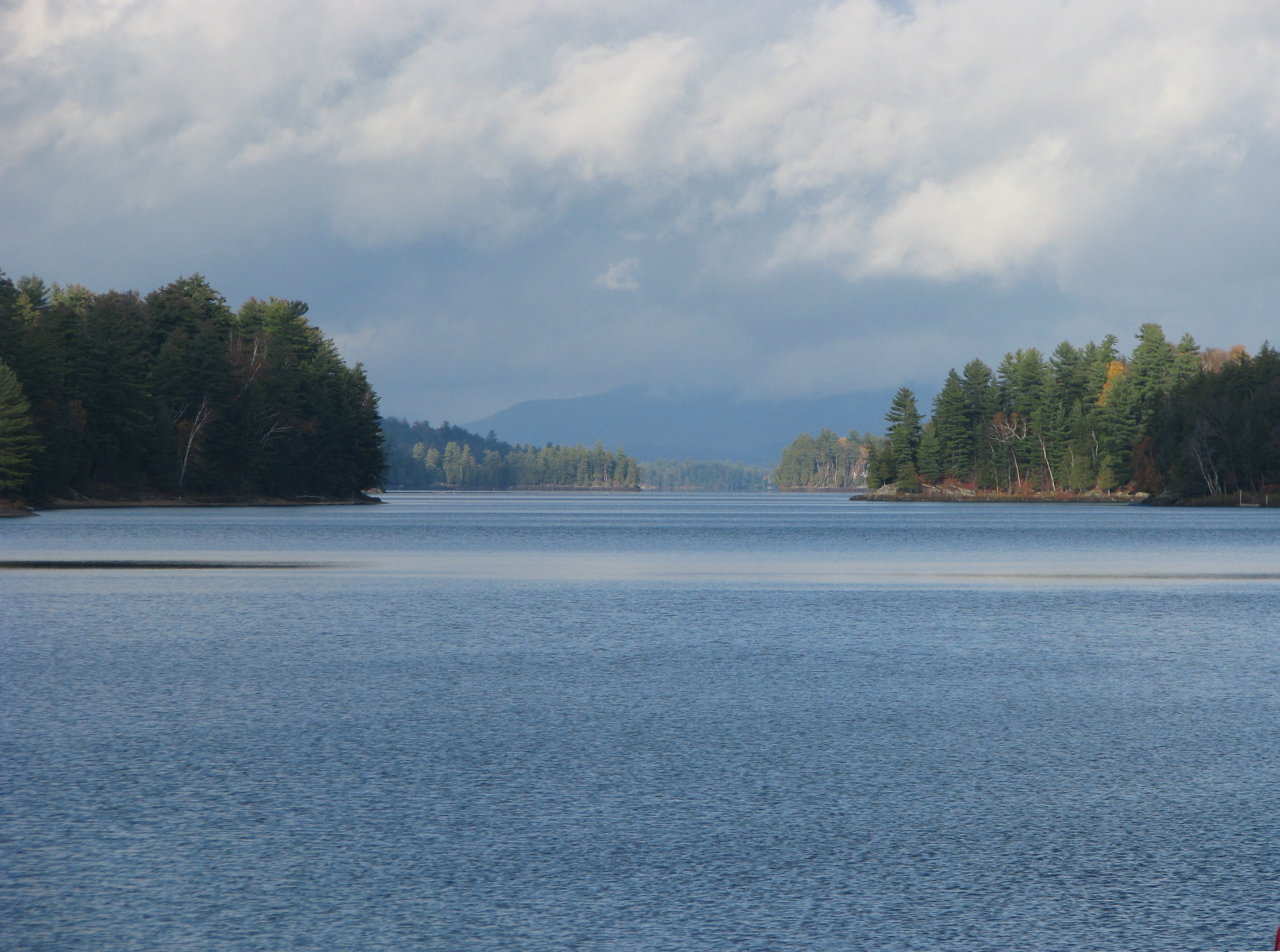
Long Lake, from near the hotel

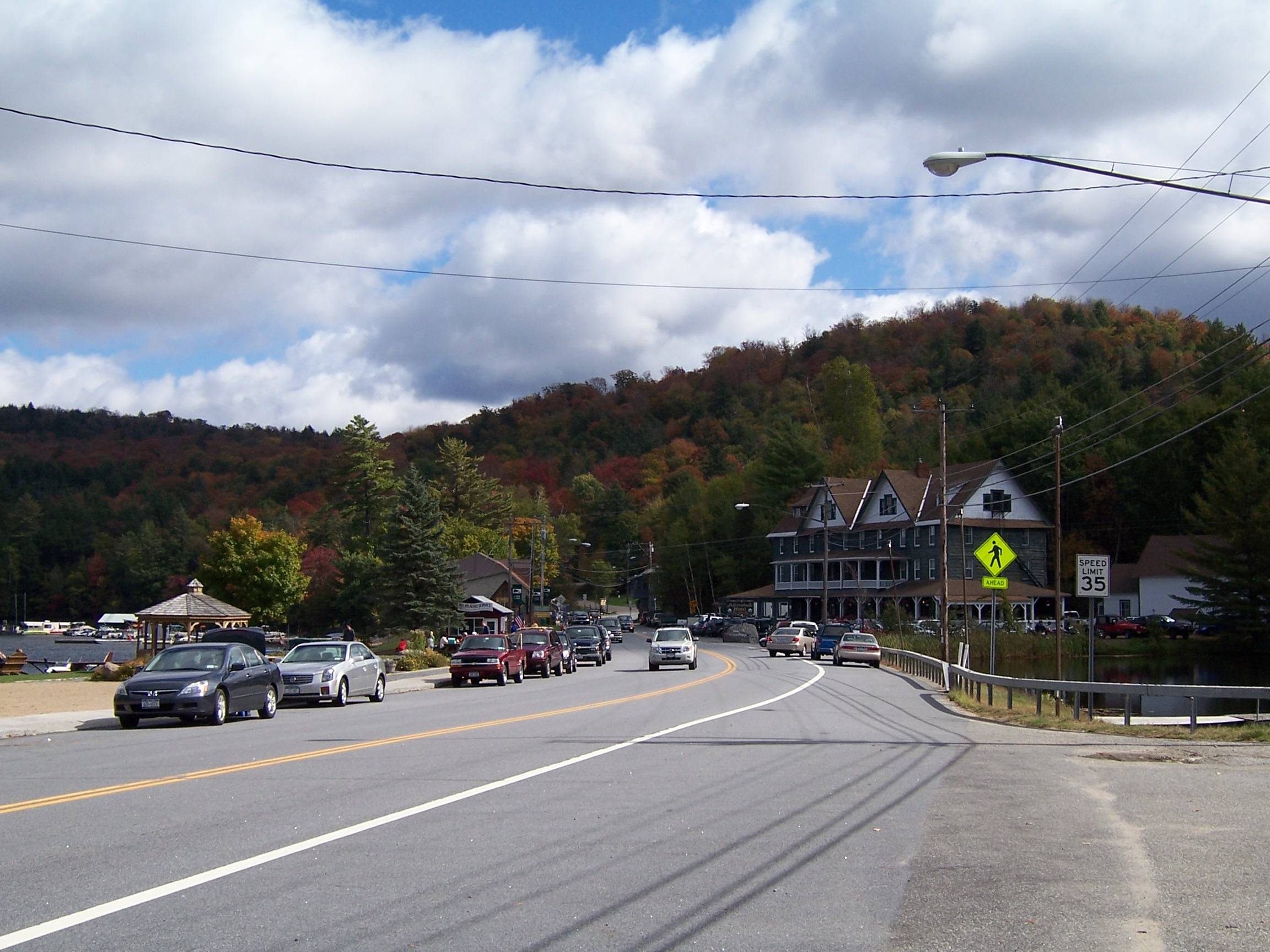
View of the Adirondack Hotel from NY 30
