= Upper Sister Lake =

- Location within New York Upper Sister Lake (the United States)
- Location: Hamilton County, New York, United States
- Coordinates: 43°52′58″N 74°45′42″W
- Type: Lake
- Basin countries: United States
- Surface area: 147 acres (0.59 km^{2})
- Max. depth: 12 feet (3.7 m)
- Shore length^{1}: 1.7 miles (2.7 km)
- Surface elevation: 1,936 feet (590 m)
- Settlements: Raquette Lake, New York
- ^{1} Shore length is not a well-defined measure.

Upper Sister Lake is located northwest of the hamlet of Raquette Lake, New York. Fish species present in the lake are brook trout, yellow perch, and black bullhead. No motors are allowed on this lake.
