= Forked Lake =

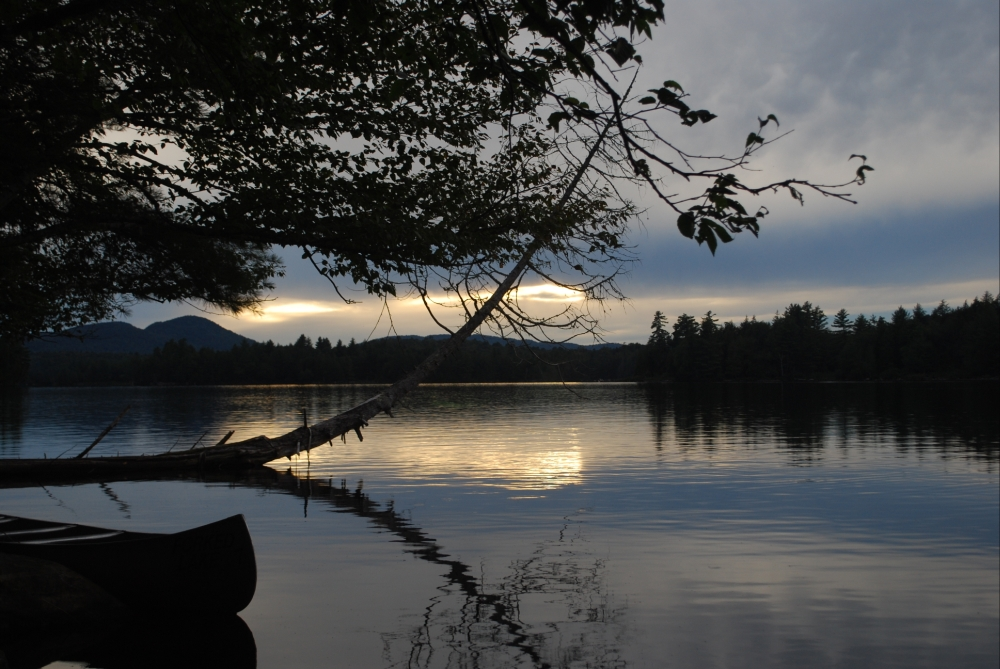

- Location within New York Forked Lake (the United States)
- Location: Adirondacks, Hamilton County, New York, United States
- Coordinates: 43°54′00″N 74°34′24″W
- Type: Reservoir
- Primary inflows: Raquette River
- Primary outflows: Raquette River
- Basin countries: United States
- Max. length: 7 mi (11 km)
- Max. width: 3.8 mi (6.1 km)
- Surface area: 893 acres (361 ha)
- Average depth: 21 ft (6.4 m)
- Max. depth: 74 ft (23 m)
- Surface elevation: 1,742 ft (531 m)
- Islands: 2
- Settlements: none

Forked Lake is a 893-acre (361 ha) lake in the Adirondack Park in New York, 7 miles (11 km) southwest of the village of Long Lake. The lake is slender, and shaped like an inverted "T", 5 miles (8.0 km) across the east-west oriented bottom but only 0.2 miles (0.32 km) wide, with its northward arm even narrower and 3.8 miles (6.1 km) long.

The state operates 80 campsites accessible by boat or by foot, except for three which can accommodate up to 20-foot (6.1 m) recreational vehicles. The camping fee is $18. The boat launch is suitable only for smaller boats.

Locking metal boxes, fire pits, picnic tables, and outhouses are available at each campsite. The lock boxes are for storing your food beyond the reach of the local bear population. Some of the campsites have docks.

Forked Lake is home to Brook trout, largemouth bass, smallmouth bass, bullhead, yellow perch, pan fish and brown trout. Maximum depth is 74 feet. Other wildlife include loon, otters, beaver, owl, deer, ducks, and bear.

The lake is also part of the 740-mile Northern Forest Canoe Trail, which begins in Old Forge, NY and ends in Fort Kent, ME.
