= USS Mohican =

USS Mohican has been the name of more than one United States Navy ship, and may refer to:

- USS Mohican (1859), a sloop-of-war, launched in 1859, commissioned that same year and decommissioned in 1872.
- USS Mohican (1883), also a sloop-of-war, launched in 1883, commissioned in 1885 and decommissioned in 1921.
- USS Mohican (SP-117), a converted yacht, commissioned in 1917 and decommissioned in 1919.
