= Mohican (disambiguation) =

The Mohican are a Native American tribe who lived in and around the Hudson Valley.

Mohican may also refer to:

== Native Americans ==
- Mohegan, a Native American tribe based in Southeastern Connecticut

== Hairstyles ==
- Mohawk hairstyle, also known as "Mohican hairstyle" in British English

== Places ==
- Mohican River in Ohio in the United States
  - Mohican State Park, which includes some of the river
- Mohican Falls, one of 24 named waterfalls in Ricketts Glen State Park in Pennsylvania in the United States
- Mohican Brook in Otsego County, New York in the United States

== Ships ==
- USS Mohican, various United States Navy ships
- Mohican II, one of Lake George Steamboat Company ships in Lake George, New York

== See also ==
- The Mohican, a 2024 thriller drama film
- The Last of the Mohicans, a novel by James Fenimore Cooper
