= Mahakan =

Mahakan ماهكان
- Village
- Location within Iran
- Coordinates: 32°24′13″N 59°17′20″E
- Country: Iran
- Province: South Khorasan
- County: Sarbisheh
- Bakhsh: Mud
- Rural District: Naharjan

Population (2006)
  - Total: 43
- Time zone: UTC+3:30 (IRST)
  - Summer (DST): UTC+4:30 (IRDT)

Mahakan (Persian: ماهكان, also Romanized as Māhakān, Māhagān, Māhegān, Maheh Kan, Mahīkān, and Mahkan) is a village in Naharjan Rural District, Mud District, Sarbisheh County, South Khorasan Province, Iran. At the 2006 census, its population was 43, in 13 families.
