= Shallow Lake (New York) =

- Location within New York Shallow Lake (the United States)
- Location: Hamilton County, New York, United States
- Coordinates: 43°49′06″N 74°44′10″W
- Type: Lake
- Primary inflows: Sucker Brook
- Primary outflows: Sucker Brook
- Basin countries: United States
- Surface area: 279 acres (1.13 km^{2})
- Average depth: 11 feet (3.4 m)
- Max. depth: 30 feet (9.1 m)
- Shore length^{1}: 3.9 miles (6.3 km)
- Surface elevation: 1,808 feet (551 m)
- Settlements: Inlet, New York
- ^{1} Shore length is not a well-defined measure.

Shallow Lake is located northeast of Inlet, New York. Fish species present in the lake are black bullhead, brook trout, white sucker and smallmouth bass. There is carry down access. No motors are allowed on this lake.
