= Adirondack guideboat =

Rowboat style particular to the Adirondacks, US

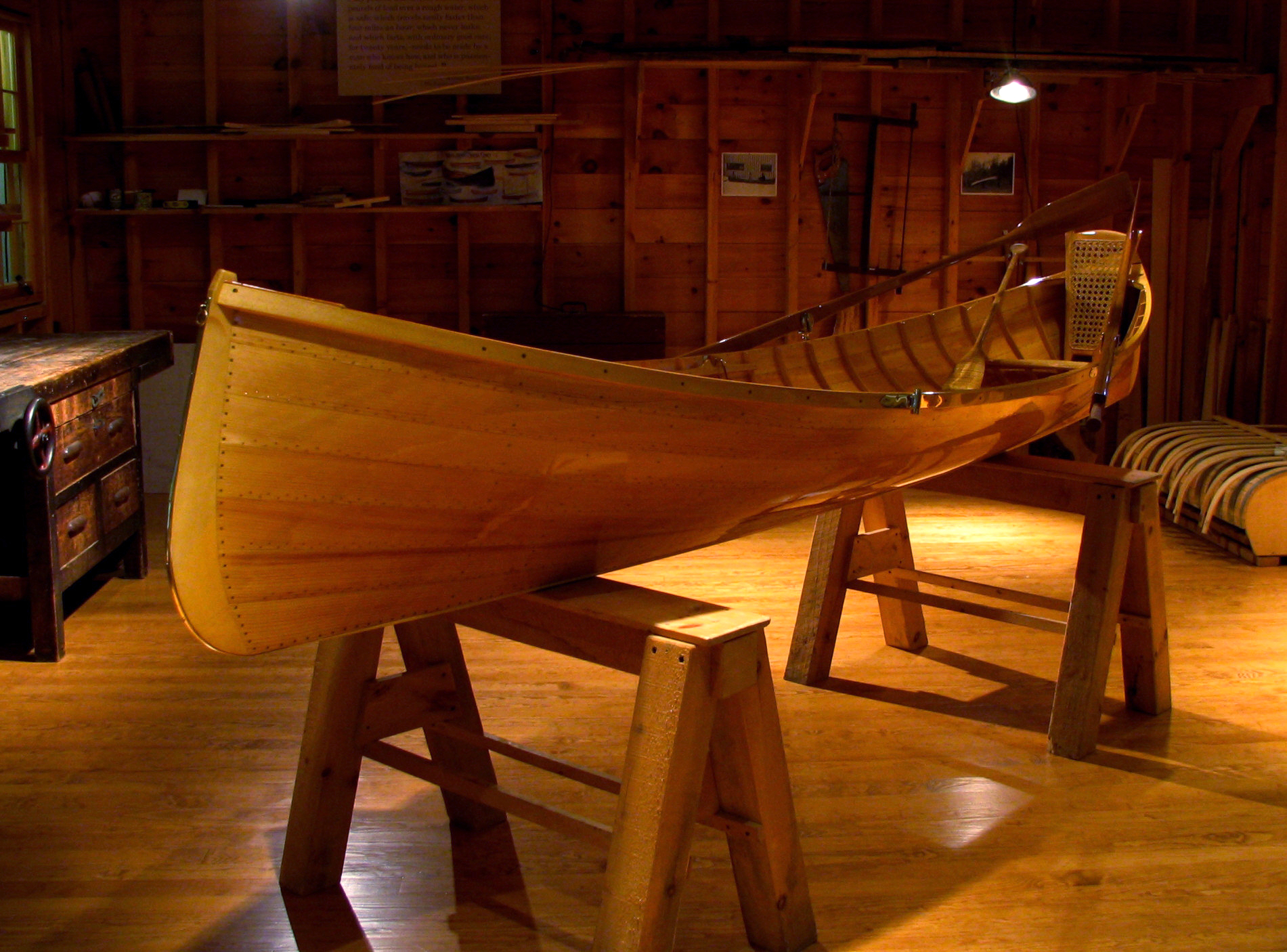
An Adirondack guideboat at the Adirondack Experience museum

The Adirondack guideboat is a rowboat that was developed in the 1840s for recreational activities in the Adirondack region of New York state.‍ It was designed to have a shallow draft, carry three people and their gear, and be light enough to be portaged by one man, the guide. It is propelled by oars in rowlocks, as a rowboat, rather than a paddle, as in a canoe. Typical dimensions are 16 feet (5 meters) in length, 38 inches (1 m) beam, and a weight of 60 pounds (25 kilograms).‍ While superficially resembling a canoe in size and profile, its construction methods are very different and are one of its defining features.‍

The stem and ribs are made from spruce, a wood which has a very high strength to weight ratio. The hull is planked up with cedar laps, with seams tacked with copper tacks. The hull has a bottom board, like a dory, typically made of pine.‍ Ribs are traditionally cut from spruce roots which have a grain following the desired curvature of the rib.‍ Adirondack historian Alfred L. Donaldson credits Adirondack guides Mitchell Sabattis and Cyrus Palmer with the invention of the guideboat.‍

Since 1962, the annual Willard Hanmer Guideboat Race has been held on the closest Sunday to the 4th of July in Saranac Lake.‍ It is a 10-mile (16-kilometer) canoe and kayak race on Lake Flower and down the Saranac River.

In 2016, modern hand-crafted versions sold for about US$20,000‍ (equivalent to $26,000 in 2024‍).

== Gallery ==
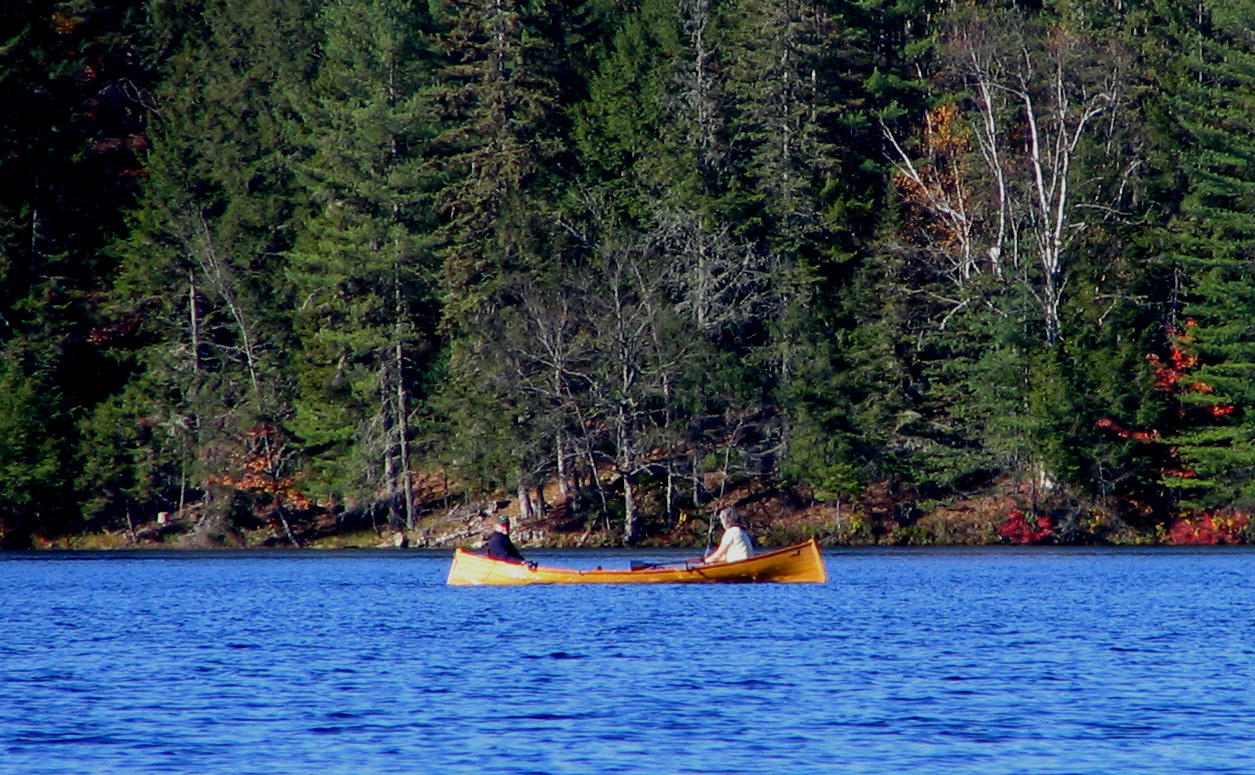

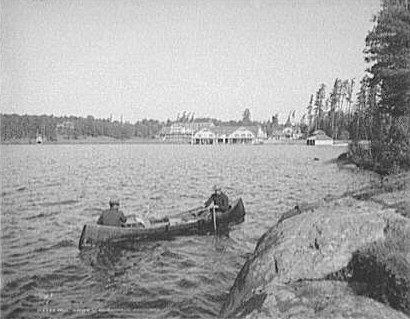

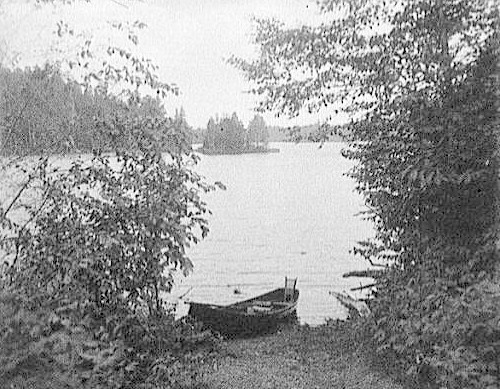
