= National Register of Historic Places listings in Hamilton County, New York =

Location of Hamilton County in New York

List of the National Register of Historic Places listings in Hamilton County, New York

This is intended to be a complete list of properties and districts listed on the National Register of Historic Places in Hamilton County, New York. The locations of National Register properties and districts (at least for all showing latitude and longitude coordinates below) may be seen in a map by clicking on "Map of all coordinates". Two sites are further designated National Historic Landmarks and the entire county is included in another, the Adirondack Forest Preserve.

This National Park Service list is complete through NPS recent listings posted October 30, 2026.

Contents: Counties in New York
Albany (Albany) – Allegany – Bronx – Broome – Cattaraugus – Cayuga – Chautauqua – Chemung – Chenango – Clinton – Columbia – Cortland – Delaware – Dutchess (Poughkeepsie, Rhinebeck) – Erie (Buffalo) – Essex – Franklin – Fulton – Genesee – Greene – Hamilton – Herkimer – Jefferson – Kings – Lewis – Livingston – Madison – Monroe (Rochester) – Montgomery – Nassau – New York (Below 14th Street, 14th to 59th Streets, 59th to 110th Streets, Above 110th Street, Islands) – Niagara (Niagara Falls) – Oneida – Onondaga (Syracuse) – Ontario – Orange – Orleans – Oswego – Otsego – Putnam – Queens – Rensselaer – Richmond – Rockland – St. Lawrence – Saratoga – Schenectady – Schoharie – Schuyler – Seneca – Steuben – Suffolk – Sullivan – Tioga – Tompkins – Ulster – Warren – Washington – Wayne – Westchester (Northern, Southern, New Rochelle, Peekskill, Yonkers) – Wyoming – Yates

== Listings county-wide ==
	Name on the Register	Image	Date listed	Location	City or town	Description
1	Adirondack Forest Preserve	Adirondack Forest Preserve	October 15, 1966 (#66000891)	NE New York State; 43°58′43″N 74°18′42″W		All of Hamilton County is in the 6-million-acre (24,000 km^{2}) Adirondack Park.
2	Blue Mountain Fire Observation Station	Blue Mountain Fire Observation Station	September 23, 2001 (#01001035)	Blue Mountain; 43°52′02″N 74°25′50″W	Town of Indian Lake	
3	Blue Mountain House Annex	Blue Mountain House Annex	December 7, 1977 (#77000941)	NY 30; 43°51′19″N 74°26′02″W	Blue Mountain Lake	Also known as The Log Hotel, on the grounds of the Adirondack Museum
4	Camp Pine Knot	Camp Pine Knot	November 7, 1986 (#86002934)	Long Point, Raquette Lake; 43°49′17″N 74°37′34″W	Raquette Lake	Pine Knot was the first of the Adirondack Great Camps; it was started beginning in 1877 by railroad developer Thomas C. Durant, and completed by William West Durant. It was sold to industrialist Collis P. Huntington in 1890.
5	Camp Taiga	Camp Taiga	June 12, 2017 (#100001068)	52 Mattson Way; 43°59′36″N 74°24′37″W	Long Lake	Small 1890s camp with ornate rustic design elements usually associated with larger camps
6	Camp Uncas	Camp Uncas	April 3, 1987 (#86002937)	Mohegan Lake; 43°44′41″N 74°38′53″W	Raquette Lake	The second Adirondack Great Camp built by William West Durant for his own use, after Camp Pine Knot. It was sold to J. Pierpont Morgan in 1896.
7	Church of the Transfiguration	Church of the Transfiguration	July 26, 1977 (#77000942)	N of Blue Mountain Lake on NY 30; 43°51′34″N 74°25′55″W	Blue Mountain Lake	1881 log church, possibly the only surviving log church in the Adirondacks, with a Meneely bell donated by Mrs. Levi P. Morton wife of future Vice-President under Benjamin Harrison 1889-1893.
8	Civilian Conservation Corps Camp S-90	Civilian Conservation Corps Camp S-90	August 2, 2016 (#16000485)	117 Page St; 43°29′08″N 74°23′06″W	Lake Pleasant	Largest intact set of remaining CCC buildings in the state; operated from 1934 to 1941
9	Dollar Island Camp		April 17, 2017 (#100000892)	Dollar Island; 43°45′38″N 74°48′21″W	Inlet	1885 camp on small island in Fourth Lake may be oldest building in town
10	Echo Camp	Echo Camp	November 7, 1986 (#86002939)	Long Point, Raquette Lake; 43°49′26″N 74°38′08″W	Raquette Lake	An Adirondack Great Camp built for Connecticut governor Phineas C. Lounsbury in 1883, its design bears the influence of William West Durant.
11	Grace Methodist Church Complex	Grace Methodist Church Complex	February 12, 2015 (#15000006)	2895 NY 8; 43°30′02″N 74°22′04″W	Speculator	1909 church and 1928 parsonage are longtime major institution in town
12	Hamilton County Courthouse Complex	Hamilton County Courthouse Complex	September 24, 1992 (#92001280)	Jct. of NY 8 and S. Shore Rd. 43°28′13″N 74°24′45″W	Lake Pleasant	
13	The Hedges	The Hedges	March 27, 2009 (#09000155)	The Hedges; 43°51′15″N 74°27′00″W	Blue Mountain Lake	New listing; refnum 09000155
14	Lake Pleasant Town Hall	Lake Pleasant Town Hall	April 23, 2009 (#09000238)	2885 NY 8; 43°30′02″N 74°21′56″W	Speculator	New listing; refnum #09000238
15	New York Central Railroad Adirondack Division Historic District	New York Central Railroad Adirondack Division Historic District	December 23, 1993 (#93001451)	NYCRR Right-of-Way; 44°00′00″N 74°46′32″W	Nehasane	The New York Central passed through Nehasane and Sabattis; the station at Nehesane on Lake Lila is extant.
16	Pillsbury Mountain Forest Fire Observation Station	Pillsbury Mountain Forest Fire Observation Station	September 9, 2010 (#10000728)	Pillsbury Mountain; 43°34′51″N 74°30′41″W	Town of Lake Pleasant vicinity	New listing from Fire Observation Stations of New York State Forest Preserve MPS; refnum 10000728
17	Sagamore	Sagamore	January 11, 1976 (#76001221)	Off NY 28 at W end of Sagamore Lake; 43°45′56″N 74°37′38″W	Raquette Lake	The third Adirondack Great Camp constructed by William West Durant on Sagamore Lake between 1895–1897; it was later sold to Alfred Gwynne Vanderbilt.
18	Snowy Mountain Fire Observation Station		September 23, 2001 (#01001031)	Snowy Mountain; 43°42′07″N 74°20′06″W	Indian Lake	
19	St. William's Catholic Church	St. William's Catholic Church	January 7, 2005 (#04001446)	Long Point on Raquette Lake; 43°49′33″N 74°37′55″W	Long Lake	
20	Wakely Mountain Fire Observation Station	Wakely Mountain Fire Observation Station	October 3, 2003 (#03000998)	Wakely Mountain; 43°43′50″N 74°28′25″W	Lake Pleasant	
21	Wells Baptist Church	Wells Baptist Church	September 1, 1988 (#88001440)	Main St. 43°24′02″N 74°17′16″W	Wells	
22	Whelan Camp		December 21, 1989 (#89002089)	Mick Rd. 43°48′27″N 74°39′13″W	Long Lake	

== See also ==
- National Register of Historic Places listings in New York
- List of National Historic Landmarks in New York
