= Rustic furniture =

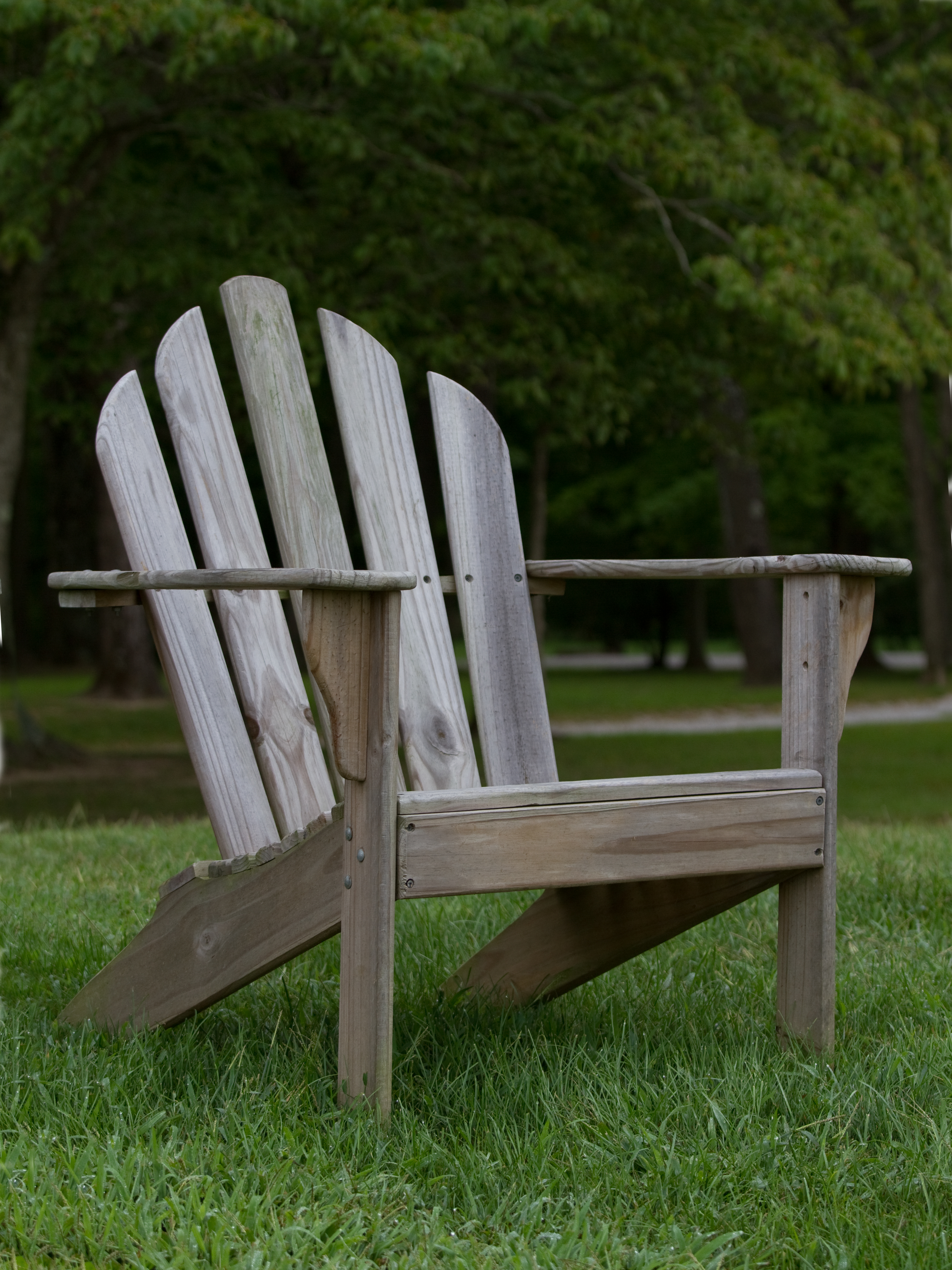
A typical Adirondack chair (2010, Ohio)

Rustic furniture is furniture employing sticks, twigs or logs for a natural look. The term "rustic" is derived from Latin rusticus (peasant; as opposed to urban). The style is rooted in Romantic tradition. In the US it is almost synonymous with the National Park Service rustic style of architecture. Many companies, artists and craftspeople make rustic furniture in a variety of styles and with a variety of historical and contemporary influences.

== History ==
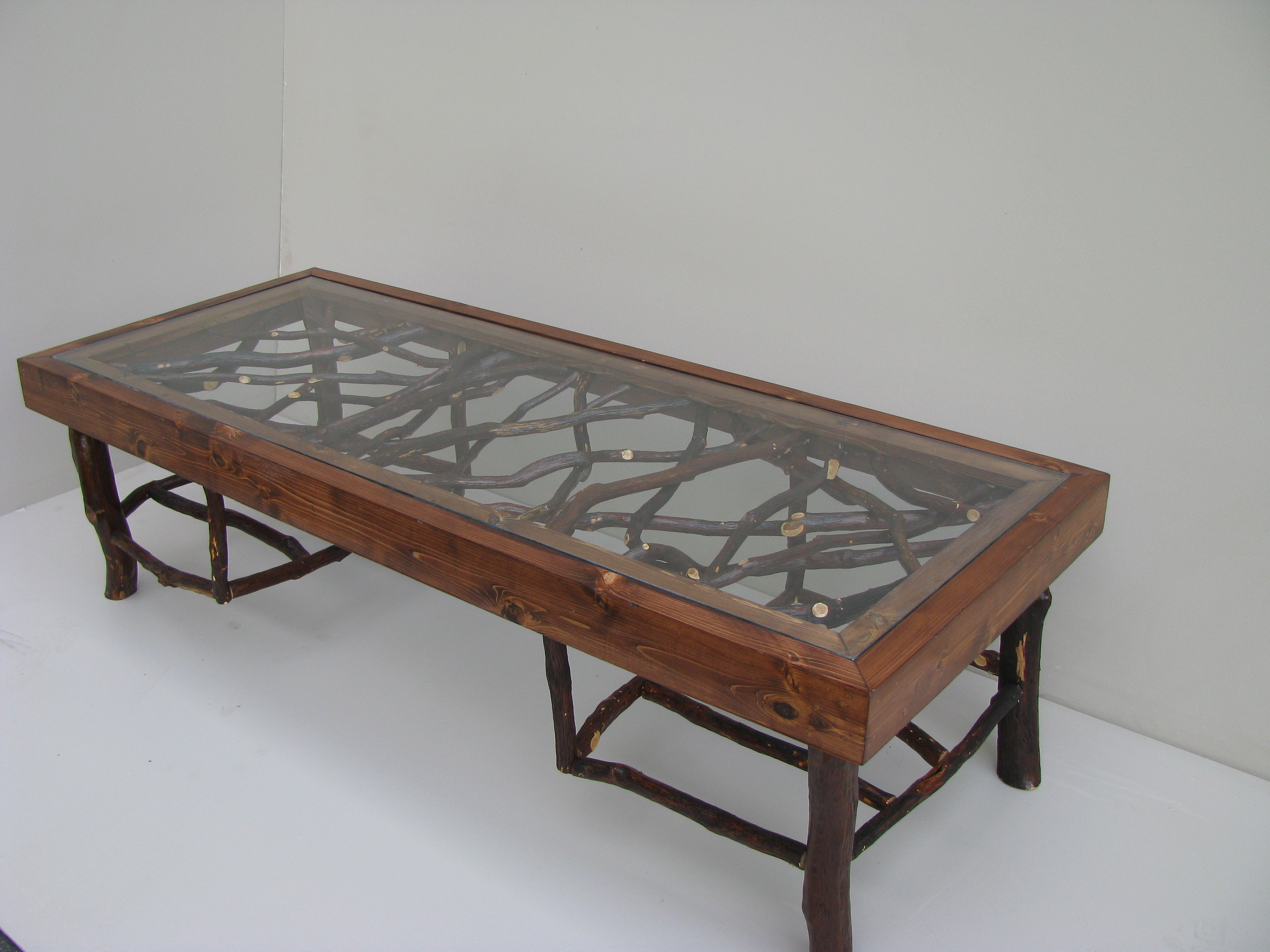
Rustic coffee table with cedar and mountain laurel branches

The rustic furniture movement developed during the mid- to late-1800s. John Gloag in A Short Dictionary Of Furniture says that "chairs and seats, with the framework carved to resemble the branches of trees, were made in the middle years of the 18th century, and there was a popular fashion for this naturalistic rustic furniture" in England. Sue Howard Stephenson explains in her Rustic Furniture (1979) that the movement was actually a revival of European styles introduced during the Romantic movement and actively reproduced in America by 1840. In the 1870s there were several American firms specialized in rustic furniture. High-quality rustic furniture was produced in Adirondack Mountains of New York for woodland camps of wealthy city dwellers. The most familiar modern form of this style is the Adirondack chair.

The style became popular at the end of the 20th century when a number or Great Camps (Camp Pine Knot, Kamp Kill Kare, Camp Uncas and Great Camp Sagamore) were built. It was also adopted by the National Park Service. The first and largest manufacturer of such furniture was Old Hickory Furniture Co., established in 1890.

Historical examples of rustic furniture may be found in museums and antique shops, although fine historical pieces are rare outside a museum setting. One showcase for this style of furniture is the Adirondack Museum (Blue Mountain Lake, New York), which hosts annual rustical furniture fairs. The New York State Museum is home to "Rustic Furniture: The Clarence O. Nichols Collection".

== Style ==
Harvey H. Kaiser in his article "The Adirondack Rustic Style" published in 1983 at The Old-House Journal argues that however "some link the style to European influences (particularly Apline chalets)... fundamentally, it's the logical, inevitable convergence of local craft traditions and readily available materials." As such various rustic styles reflect the personality of their maker, with techniques such as chip carving, silver or gold brushwork, milk paint, peeled bark and other decorative enhancements.

Rustic furniture can sometimes refer to furniture displaying a distinct lack of craftsmanship involved. Quite often, you will find untreated/minimally-treated logs sold off as 'rustic' pieces of furniture commanding prices vastly in excess of their more modern, polished looking counterparts. Whilst some may say more of the raw material is utilized in the crafting of more 'solid' looking pieces of furniture, it may also be argued that the labour costs involved in the manufacturing of such pieces indicates a vast inflation of sold unit prices, if fully taking into consideration actual costs of labour time and raw materials involved. It widens the definition of the word 'furniture' from that of a well crafted, polished-looking product derived from a raw material, to almost any sample of raw material or timber minimally shaped to fulfill the basic purpose of the named furniture type (e.g. untreated sawn tree stump sold as a rustic coffee or bedside table).

In the world of rustic furniture, creativity knows no bounds, and the incorporation of additional materials such as metal, epoxy resin, and leather has become a common practice. These materials can add a touch of uniqueness and elegance to rustic pieces, further expanding the realm of possibilities in this distinct style of furniture design.

A recent trend in rustic furniture design is recycling pallets to make furniture.

== Construction ==
Typical items of rustic furniture include chairs, love seats, tables, desks, smoking stands (often with a cabin on top), clocks, chest of drawers, rockers, coat racks, mirror frames, beds and lamps.

Many different wood species were used including willow, hickory, mountain laurel, and Alaska cedar. In the American South, palm fronds were occasionally employed.

There are two basic types of rustic-furniture construction: bentwood (sticks are harvested fresh or steamed to make them supple, then bent into a variety of structures and decorative shapes) and twig work (sticks – straight, curved or forked – are assembled into structures and decorative shapes within a structure). Sometimes both types are used in the same piece. Some rustic furniture makers use mortice and tenon construction; others simply nail or screw members together.
