= Whelan Camp =

- U.S. National Register of Historic Places
- U.S. Historic district
- Location within New York Location within the United States
- Location: Mick Rd., Long Lake, New York
- Coordinates: 43°48′27″N 74°39′13″W
- Area: 6.7 acres (2.7 ha)
- Built: 1915
- Architectural style: Shingle Style, Adirondack Rustic
- NRHP reference No.: 89002089
- Added to NRHP: December 21, 1989

Whelan Camp is a historic late period Adirondack Great Camp and national historic district located on Raquette Lake at Long Lake in Hamilton County, New York. The district includes four contributing buildings and one contributing structure. It is composed of a large, sprawling Shingle Style main camp and five supporting buildings constructed between 1915 and 1918. The buildings include the Main Lodge, Garcon Lodge, Power House, lean-to, and workshop. It was added to the National Register of Historic Places in 1989.
