= The Hedges =

Historic house in New York, United States

- The Hedges on Blue Mountain Lake
- U.S. National Register of Historic Places
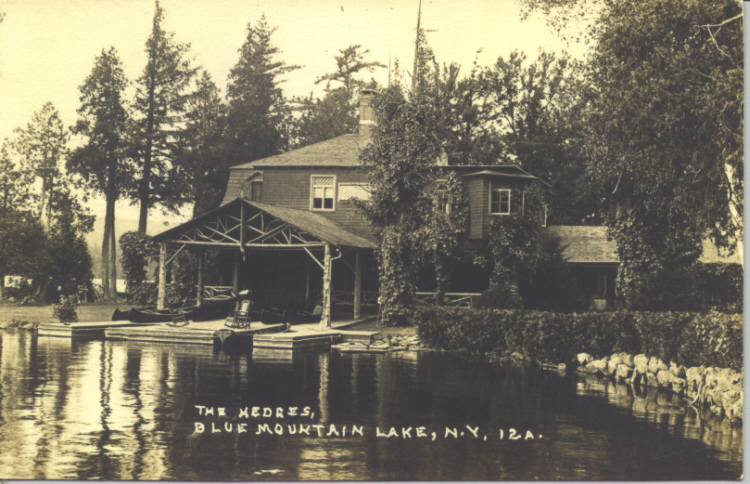
- H. M. Beach photo of The Hedges, ca. 1910

- Location within New York Location within the United States
- Location: Blue Mountain Lake, New York
- Coordinates: 43°51′15″N 74°27′0″W
- Area: 12.5 acres (5.1 ha)
- NRHP reference No.: 09000155
- Added to NRHP: March 27, 2009

The Hedges is a historic home and Adirondack Great Camp located on Blue Mountain Lake in Hamilton County, New York. The property consists of 30 buildings and structures and many related site features. From about 1890 to 1920, it was the seasonal home of Hiram B. Duryea, and from this period nine buildings and structures remain. In 1920, it was purchased by Richard J. Collins and converted to an Adirondack resort. The Main Lodge complex was built in 1882; the main block is a two-story, wood-framed building with a mansard roof. The Stone Lodge was built 1900–03 and is a two-story gambrel-roofed building.

In 1914, one of Duryea's sons killed him in derangement; after Duryea's other son committed suicide amid financial distress several years later, Richard Collins, the caretaker of Sagamore Lodge purchased the Hedges in 1920 and developed it as a hotel, adding a rustic dining hall c. 1925 and eight cottages on the lakeshore in the 1930s. The hotel was operated by the Collins family until 1972. It was added to the National Register of Historic Places in 2009.

In March 2018, the Hedges was sold to a coalition of sixty individuals and families, many of whom had a long history as guests at the resort. It remains open to the public as a resort.

== Gallery ==
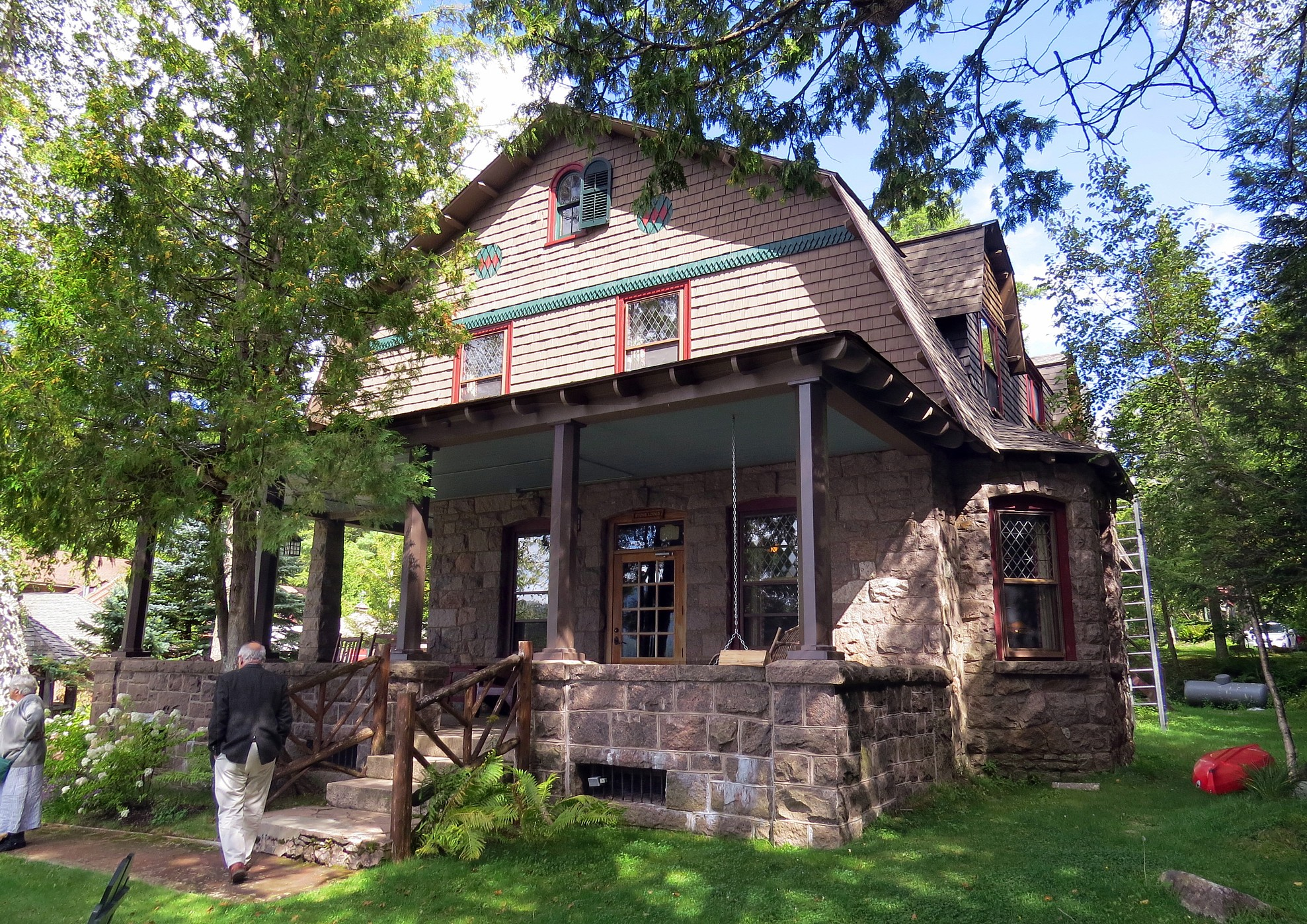
The Stone Lodge at The Hedges

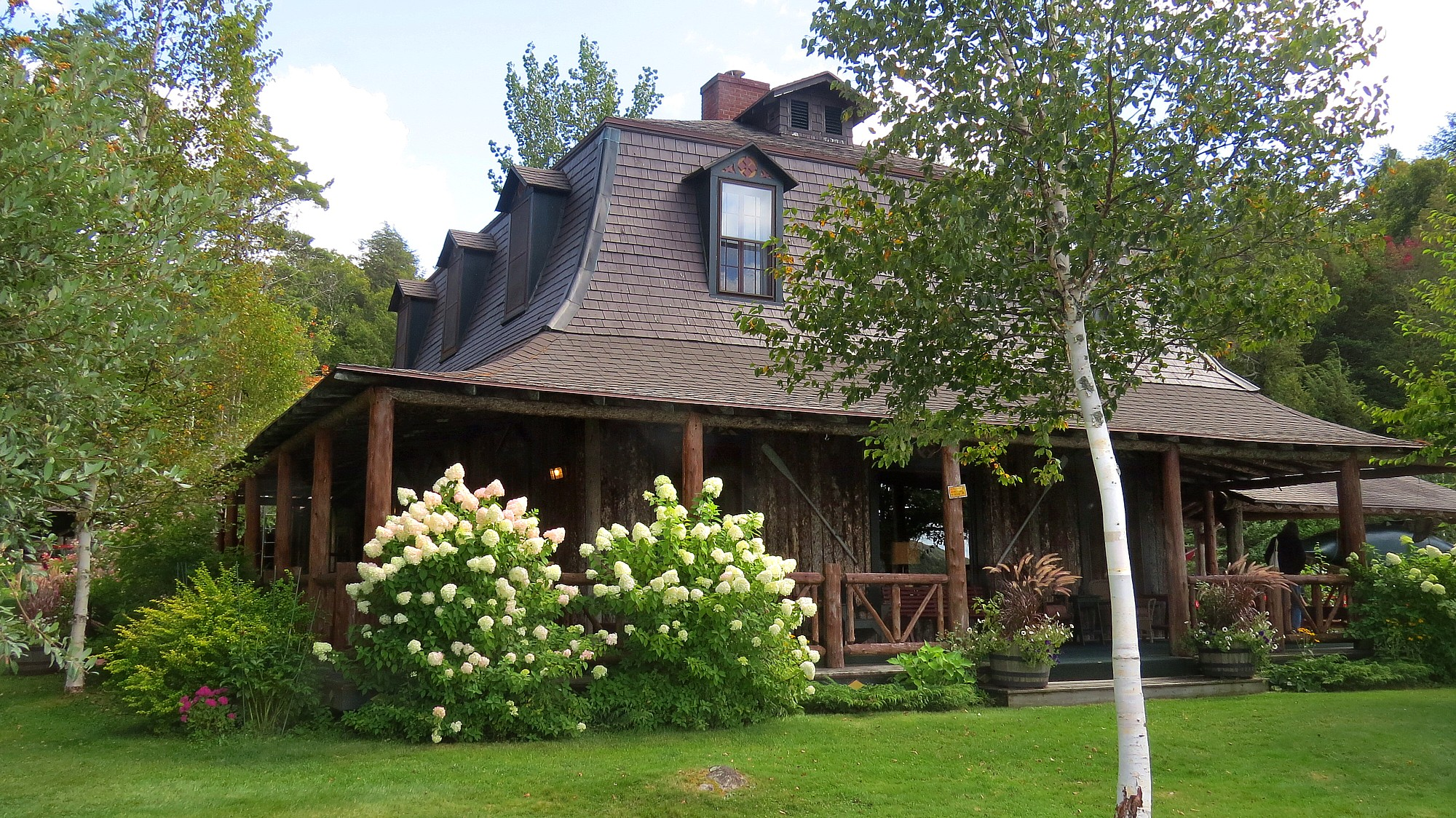
The Main Lodge at The Hedges

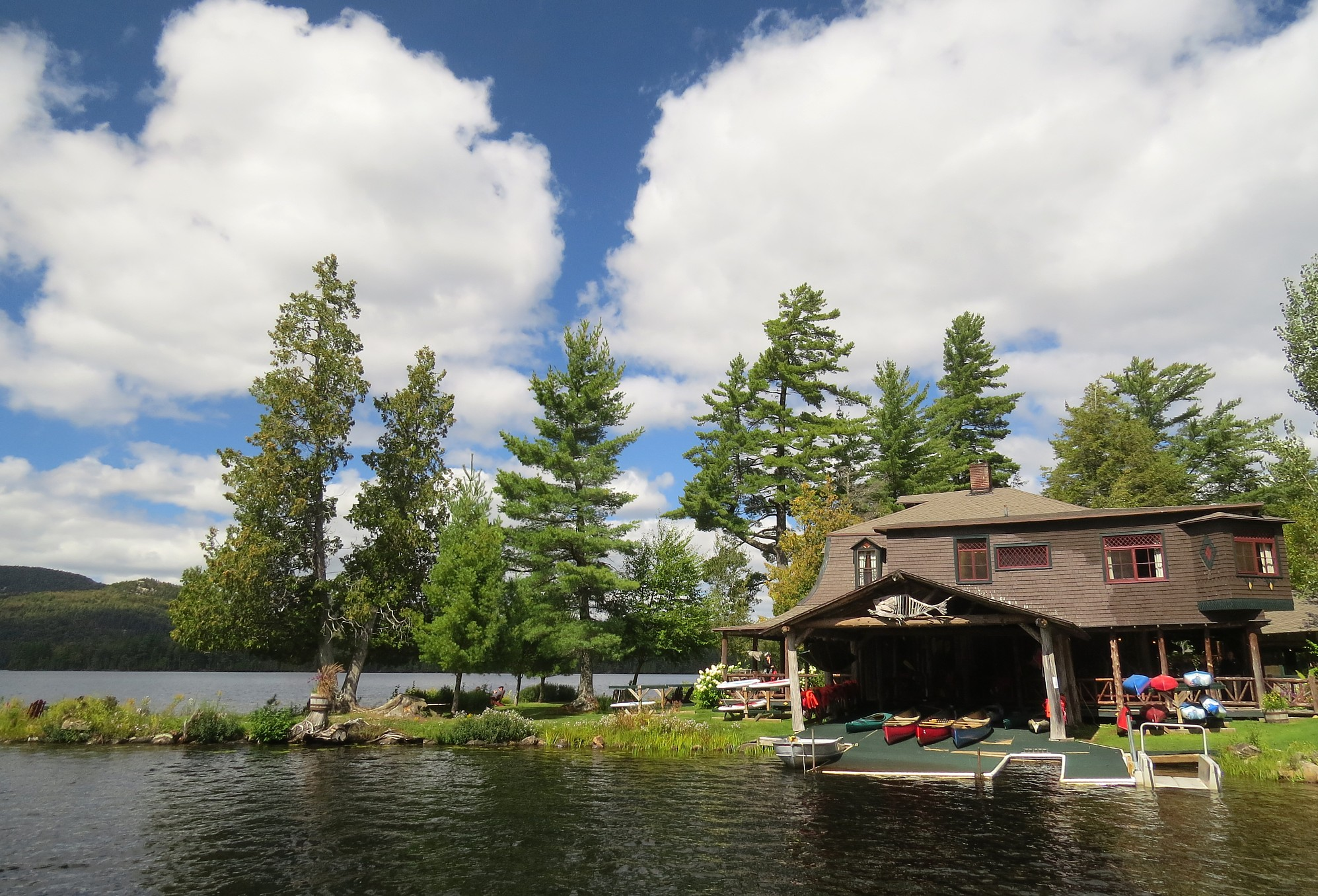
The Main Lodge Boat Dock at The Hedges
