= William West Durant =

American developer

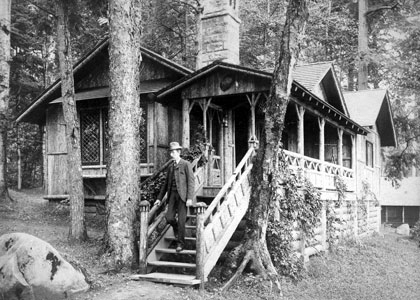
William West Durant at Camp Pine Knot

William West Durant (1850–1934) was a designer and developer of camps in the Adirondack Great Camp style, including Camp Uncas, Camp Pine Knot and Great Camp Sagamore; all have been designated National Historic Landmarks. He was the son of Thomas C. Durant, the financier and railroad promoter who was behind the Crédit Mobilier scandal.

== Early life ==
Durant was born in Brooklyn, New York, in 1850. He attended Twickenham School in England and was privately tutored. Although in his biographies William states he was educated at Bonn University, the University has no record of his attendance between 1866-1875. A review of his collection of letters housed at the Library of Congress does not reveal any indication that he undertook a formal education while living abroad. He did however travel extensively as a youth in Europe. He toured Egypt in the years 1869 and 1873. While in Egypt he was escorted by a tutor. At 24, his father, Thomas C. Durant, summoned him home from Egypt to help develop the central Adirondacks where the Durants owned 1/2 million acres.

== Career ==
While working to complete the eastern half of the First transcontinental railroad in 1869 as vice-president of the Union Pacific, the senior Durant formed the Adirondack Company in 1863, accumulating half a million acres of land at State auctions for five cents an acre. He also sold a large parcel of land in Brooklyn for the development of Prospect Park for two hundred thousand dollars. His goal for the Adirondack Railroad was to cross the Adirondacks to Canada and the Saint Lawrence River. By 1871, tracks had been laid 50 miles northwest from Saratoga to North Creek, at which point, financial problems and the Panic of 1873 caused the project to stall.

=== Great Camps ===
In 1876, Durant built a rustic compound on Long Point in Raquette Lake in the center of the Adirondacks to entertain potential investors in the railroad and in his land development schemes. William had first seen Raquette Lake the summer before and spent the following winter living there in a tent. This group of simple cabins would become Camp Pine Knot, which would be hugely influential in the development of the Great Camp style. William had a hand in its development from the start, but especially after 1879, when tourism to the area exploded following the publication of WHH Murray's Adventures in the Wilderness. William opened a stagecoach line from North Creek to Raquette Lake, dammed the Marion River to allow steamboat travel from Blue Mountain Lake through to Eagle and Utowana Lakes, and built steamboats Killoquah and Toowahloondah on Raquette and Blue Mountain Lakes, respectively. He also arranged for the construction of the Church of the Good Shepherd on St. Hubert's Isle, and created a telegraph company to provide service through to Raquette Lake.

In 1884, William married Janet Lathrop Stott, 19, the only surviving daughter of the Stotts of Bluff Point and Stottville, New York, a family with which the Durants had had business and family relationships for several generations. They settled in Saratoga Springs, conveniently located between Raquette Lake and Albany where many of William's dealings took him.

Dr. Durant became ill in 1883 and died, intestate, in 1885. William took control of the family finances, although not without discord with his sister, Ella. William promptly set out to raise capital by selling land and timber, and sought a buyer for the Adirondack Railway, finally succeeding in 1899 with a sale to the Delaware and Hudson Canal Company. He also started work on a new camp, Camp Uncas. At about this time, William befriended industrialist Collis P. Huntington, who would prove instrumental in advancing William's fortunes, lending William over $200,000 using the Adirondack Land holdings as collateral. In 1895, William and his wife initiated divorce proceedings against one another. William sold Pine Knot to Huntington and J.P. Morgan bought Uncas. He and his wife Janet were granted a divorce, which was sealed from the public in 1898.

William started work on a new camp complex on Shedd Lake, later renamed Sagamore Lake. It was to be the largest and most expensive of Durant's camps, centered on a three-story, 27-by-62-foot (8.2 by 18.9 m) main lodge, with a raised stone cellar adding to the height, and verandahs on three levels. No sooner was the work completed on Sagamore Camp than he was forced to sell it, along with 1,526 acres (618 ha), to Alfred G. Vanderbilt, in 1900. As with each of William's great camps, there was little or no profit.

In 1890, William had granted his sister a monthly $200 allowance. She had doubts about whether she was receiving her fair share of their father's estate, especially when, in 1890, William bought a $200,000, 191-foot (58 m) ocean-going luxury yacht, Utowana. In 1893, Ella brought suit to attempt to force her brother to render a public accounting of the estate; William's legal stratagems would delay the trial for six years. When the case finally came to trial, it generated a substantial public interest. The court ruled against William, and he was ordered to pay Ella $753,931. William appealed, and lost again.

Ella's victory, however, proved largely pyrrhic. William had been living beyond his means for several years, and Collis Huntington had bailed him out as needed, but in 1900, Huntington died unexpectedly at Pine Knot. Between his divorce, his creditors and his sister's suit, William's financial position deteriorated rapidly, and by 1904, he declared bankruptcy. His ex-wife Janet followed suit, claiming bankruptcy in 1913.

He married a Canadian woman 23 years his junior who kept a boardinghouse in New York City and dabbled in real estate. He tried a number of modest ventures, and then returned to the Adirondacks to manage a hotel on Long Lake, and then another on Lake Harris. This was followed, in 1910 by an attempt at mushroom farming in Maine that went nowhere. He worked for three years for a development on Long Island, and then worked doing title searches for Adirondack land sales.

== Death ==
William West Durant died at Mount Sinai Hospital on June 1, 1934, age 83, and was interred in the family's mausoleum, built in Brooklyn's fashionable Greenwood Cemetery in 1873 for $60,000. His sister Heloise was not to have a place there. According to a letter he wrote in 1932 to his old friend Poultney Bigelow, William said, "I am poor but in good health and not unhappy. What more can anyone expect?"

== Legacy ==
William West Durant's life has been written about in Donaldson's, Hochschild's and Gilborn's non-fiction biographies. Sheila Myers wrote a trilogy of novels on the Durant family which includes William West Durant as a main character.
