= Raquette Lake =

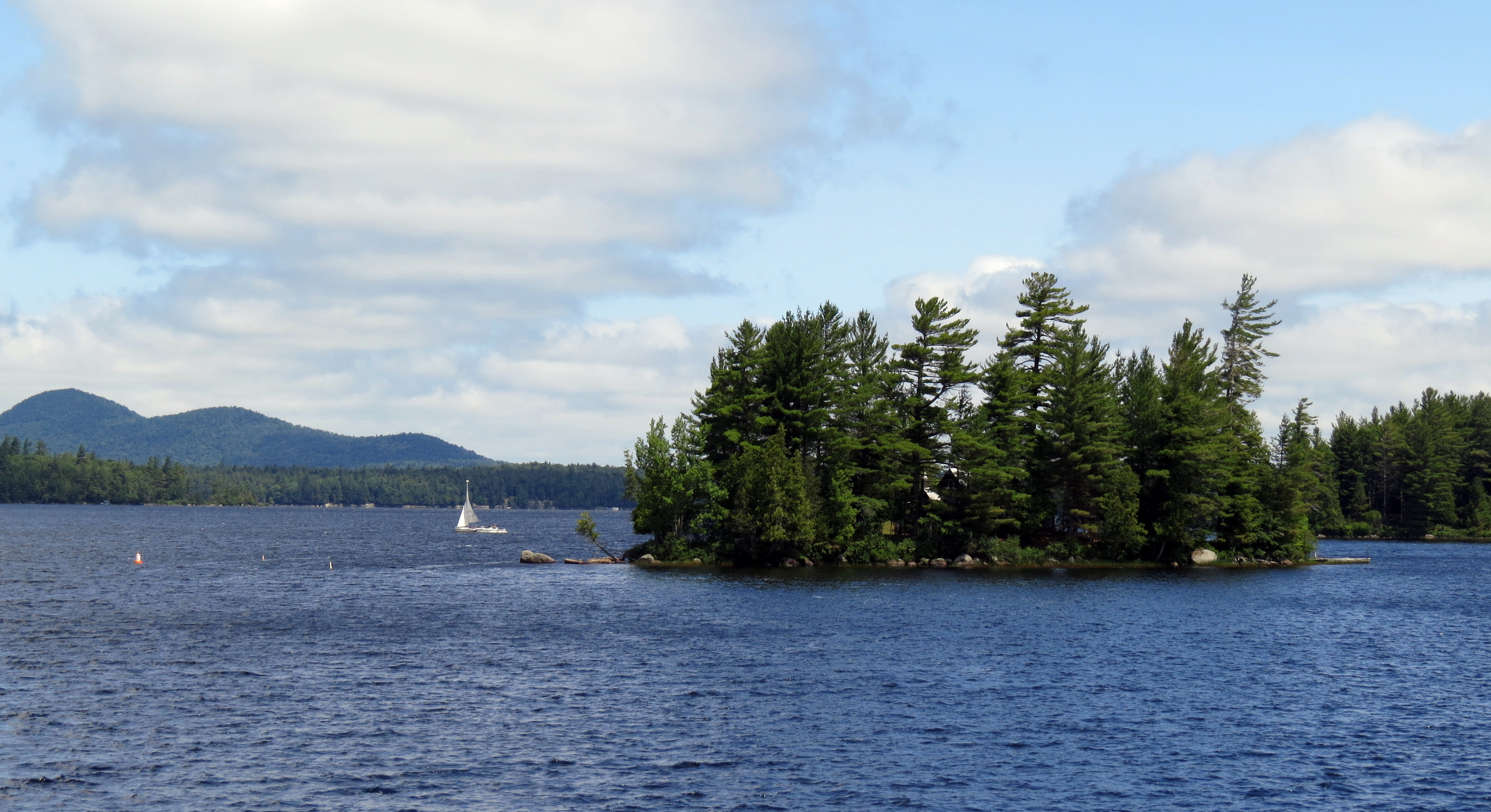
- Looking north at Strawberry Island on Raquette Lake from the southwestern corner

- Location within New York Raquette Lake (the United States)
- Location: Adirondack Mountains, Hamilton County, New York, United States
- Coordinates: 43°50′N 74°39′W
- Type: Lake
- Primary inflows: Marion River, Browns Tract Inlet, Death Brook, Boulder Brook, Sucker Brook, South Inlet
- Primary outflows: Raquette River
- Basin countries: United States
- Surface area: 4,925 acres (19.93 km^{2})
- Average depth: 44 feet (13 m)
- Max. depth: 95 feet (29 m)
- Shore length^{1}: 99 miles (159 km)
- Surface elevation: 1,762 feet (537 m)
- Islands: Harding Island; Big Island; Inman Island; Osprey Island; Hen and Chicken Islands; Beecher Island; St. Hubert Island; Strawberry Island; Needle Island
- ^{1} Shore length is not a well-defined measure.

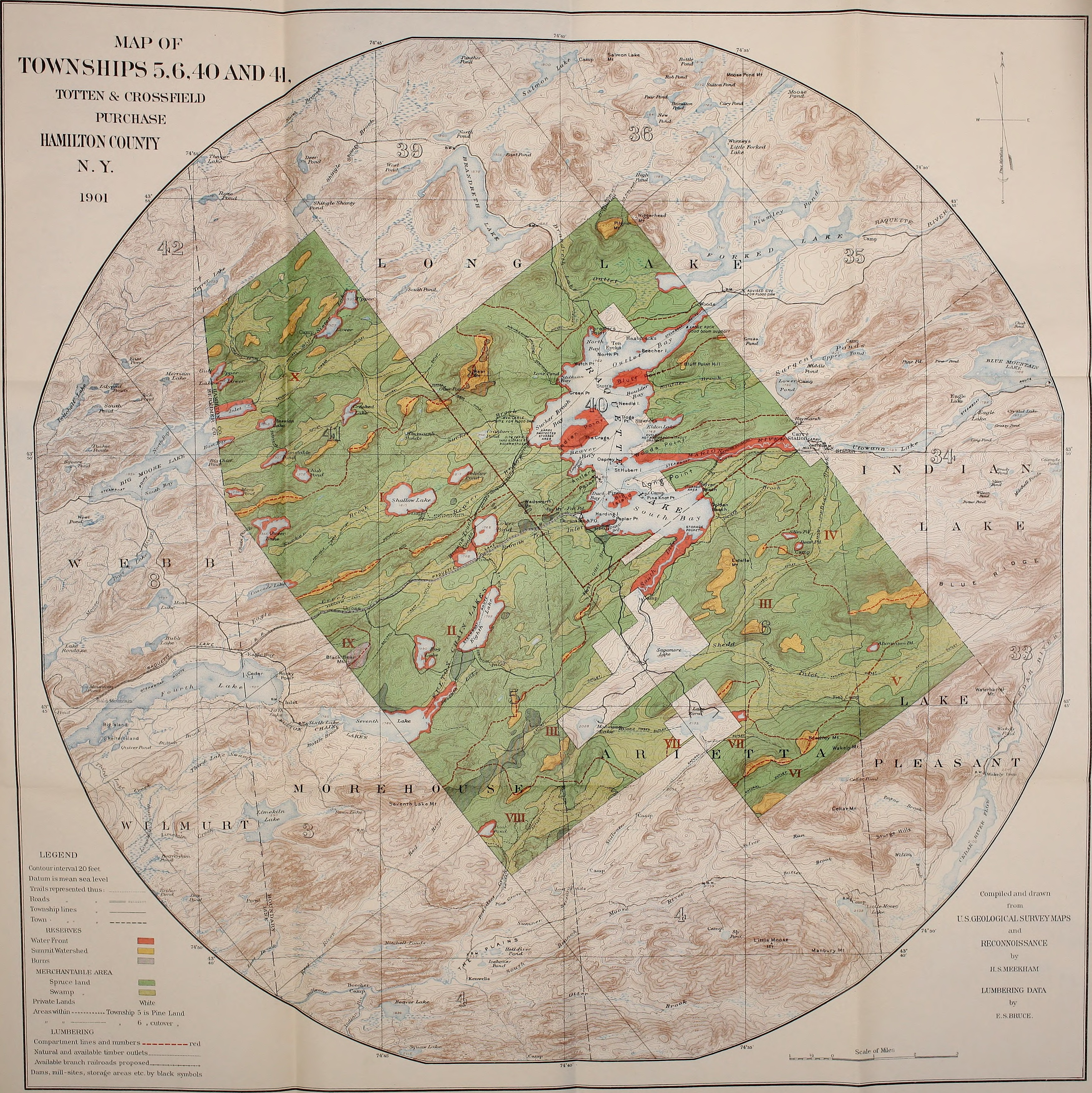
Map of Raquette Lake and vicinity.

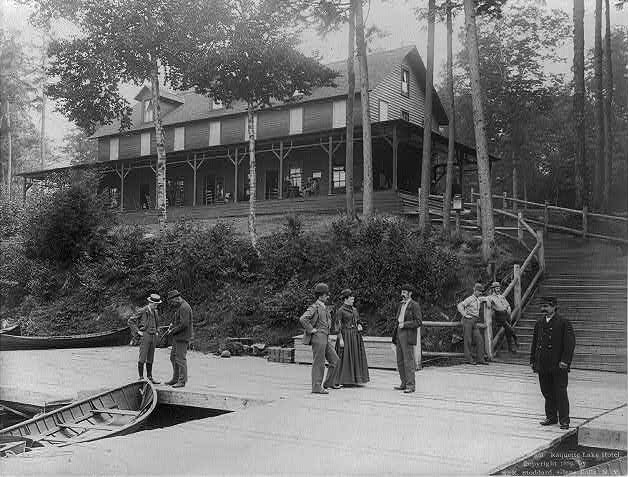
Raquette Lake Hotel by Seneca Ray Stoddard (1889)

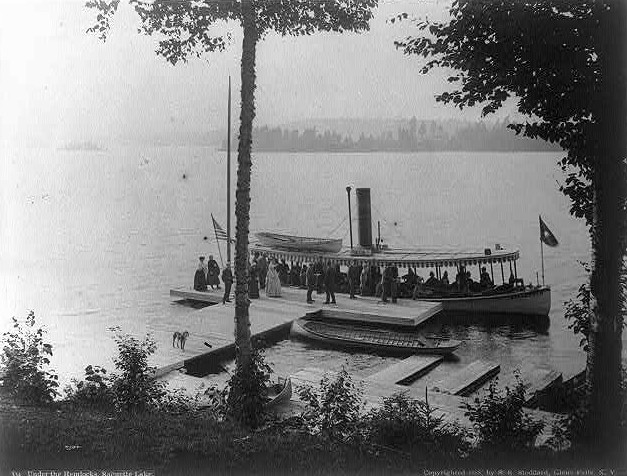
Small steamers brought guests from Blue Mountain Lake via the Eckford Chain of Lakes and the Marion River Carry. "Under the hemlocks" - Raquette Lake, 1888, S R Stoddard

Raquette Lake is a lake in the Adirondack Mountains of New York State. The source of the Raquette River, it is near the community of Raquette Lake, New York. The lake has 99-mile (159 km) shoreline, bordered with pines and mountains. It is located in the towns of Long Lake and Arietta, both in Hamilton County.

Raquette Lake is popular, especially in summer, due to the scenery, wildlife, boating and hiking. There are several children's summer camps, including Raquette Lake Boys Camp and Raquette Lake Girls Camp. In winter, substantial snowfall makes the area popular for snowmobiling, cross-country skiing, and snowshoeing. The lake is also part of the 740-mile Northern Forest Canoe Trail, which begins in Old Forge, NY and ends in Fort Kent, ME.

== History ==
The origin of the name is uncertain. One account is that it was named for snowshoes (raquette in French) left by a party of Tories led by Sir John Johnson in 1776. Traveling by snowshoe, they were overtaken by a spring thaw when they reached the lake. They left the snowshoes en masse on the shore.

Raquette Lake developed into one of the most prestigious summer getaways for the elite in the 19th century. In 1877, William West Durant started work on what would become the first of the "Great Camps", Pine Knot. Other summer homes in the "great camp style" on Raquette Lake include North Point (the 1870 buildings replaced by Lucy Carnegie in 1903), Echo Camp (1883) and Bluff Point (1876).

Raquette Lake served as a midpoint to other Gilded Age retreats such as the Great Camps Sagamore (1897; now a National Historic Landmark), Camp Uncas (1890; became a National Historic Landmark in fall 2008), and Kamp Kill Kare (1896) on nearby lakes Sagamore, Mohegan, and Kora, respectively. Sagamore is open to the public for guided tours during non-winter months and also as an educational facility.

== Bluff Point ==
Bluff Point is still a private camp and run much as it was over 100 years ago. It was built by Francis Stott of Stottville, New York, at the suggestion of Dr. Thomas C. Durant. Durant and Mrs. Stott's family had briefly been in business together as Durant, Lathrop & Co. in Albany, New York, during the 1840s. When Bluff Point was sold to magazine publisher Robert Collier in 1905, most of the original structures were modified and expanded into the present score of buildings — the huge walk-in fireplace, the bowling alley, the bridge to the gazebo, etc.

== Pine Knot and William West Durant ==
Pine Knot, Uncas and Sagamore were designed using natural materials native to the Adirondacks by William West Durant, the son of Thomas C. Durant. The senior Durant was most famous for the building the eastern half of the Transcontinental Railroad. The first of these "Great Camps" was Camp Pine Knot, started by Thomas and taken over by William in 1879. The construction continued through 1890. This artistic camp was used by W.W. Durant as a showcase, as he wined and dined railroad tycoons, selling them on the idea of his building a camp for each of them.

In 1895, W.W. Durant sold the camp to Collis P. Huntington (builder of the western half of the Transcontinental Railroad) in partial repayment of a debt. In 1949, Archer Huntington gave the camp to SUNY Cortland, to be used for education and never to be turned over to the state. In 1938, the family provided the land for the Raquette Lake Chapel in the village for $1.

William West Durant also provided the funding for two summer chapels on Raquette Lake, accessible only by water. The Church of the Good Shepherd (1880) and St. William's Catholic Church on Long Point (1890) were each designed by J. Cleaveland Cady of Cady, Berg & See, New York City.

== See also ==
- Joe Bryere
