= Héloïse Durant Rose =

American playwright (c.1853–1943)

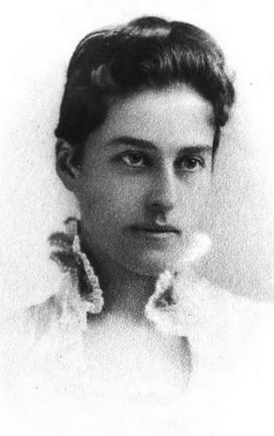
- Héloïse Durant, from an 1892 publication
- Born: Héloïse Hannah Durant c. 1853; New York City, U.S.
- Died: March 20, 1943 (aged 90); St. Petersburg, Florida, U.S.
- Children: 1

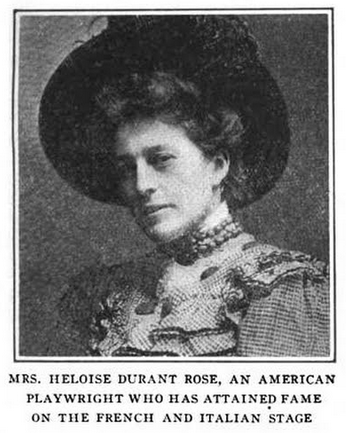
Héloïse Durant Rose, from a 1908 publication.

Héloïse Durant Rose (c. 1853 – March 20, 1943) was an American poet, playwright and critic.

== Early life ==
Héloïse Hannah "Ella" Durant was born in New York City, the daughter of Thomas C. Durant and Héloïse Hannah Timbrell Durant. Her father was a Union Pacific Railroad executive. Her mother was born in England and immigrated to the United States as a child. Héloïse the younger was educated in Europe.

== Career ==
=== Writing and literary activities ===
Books by Durant Rose include Pine Needles, or Sonnets and Songs (1884), Dante: A Dramatic Poem (1892), and A Ducal Skeleton (1899). In 1881, she became a founding member of the Dante Society of America. She wrote short stories for newspapers including the New York Times, and more than a dozen plays, among them a comedietta called Our Family Motto, or Noblesse Oblige that was produced in London in 1889 at a hospital fundraiser, She acted in French in her own play, Un Héros de la Vendée, in London in 1889.

Her play about the life of Dante Alighieri was translated into Italian and produced in Verona in 1908. In 1917 Durant Rose founded the Dante League of America, in New York City. The Washington, D.C.–based League of American Pen Women honored her in 1921 for her work promoting Dante.

=== Philanthropy ===
Durant Rose was involved in work to give women students more access to classes and examinations at Columbia University in the 1880s. She was founder and chair of the International Association for Housing Students and Travelers from 1912 to 1914.

She trained as a nurse while living in London, and worked caring for poor patients in the city. In 1898 she headed a theatrical fundraiser for the First New York Ambulance Red Cross Equipment Society, which included her own play By the King's Command along with other tableaux and performances.

== Lawsuits against brother ==
Architect William West Durant was Durant Rose's only brother. She sued him many times over forty years, for her portion of their father's estate. The legal battle was reported in detail in newspapers. She even had him arrested in 1898. By the time the courts ruled in her favor, William had spent much of the money. He declared bankruptcy in 1904, and in 1905 she sued him again, for misappropriation of funds. In 1916 and 1926, she sued him again, because she still had not received her portion.

== Personal life and legacy ==
Durant Rose married twice. Her first husband was Arthur Frethey, a medical student she met in London; she was widowed when he died just six weeks after their 1891 wedding. She married a Danish man, Charles Heinrich Marcus Rose, in 1895. She had one son, Timbrell Durant Rose (1896–1962). She and Charles moved to St. Petersburg, Florida by 1932, where she was widowed in 1937, and died in 1943, aged about 90 years. A collection of her letters is archived in the Special Collections Research Center, Syracuse University.

Author Sheila Myers wrote a trilogy of novels, Imaginary Brightness, Castles in the Air, and The Night is Done, based on the Durant family, with Ella Durant as one of the main characters.
