= Hen and Chicken Islands (Raquette Lake) =

Group of islands in Raquette Lake, New York, United States

- Location within New York Adirondack Park Location within the United States

Geography
- Location: Sucker Brook Bay, Raquette Lake
- Coordinates: 43°50′40″N 74°39′45″W
- Highest elevation: 1,762 ft (537.1 m)

Administration
- United States
- State: New York
- County: Hamilton
- Town: Long Lake

Hen and Chicken Islands is a small group of islands on Raquette Lake in Hamilton County, New York.
