= Thomas C. Durant =

Railroad promoter, financier

Thomas Clark Durant
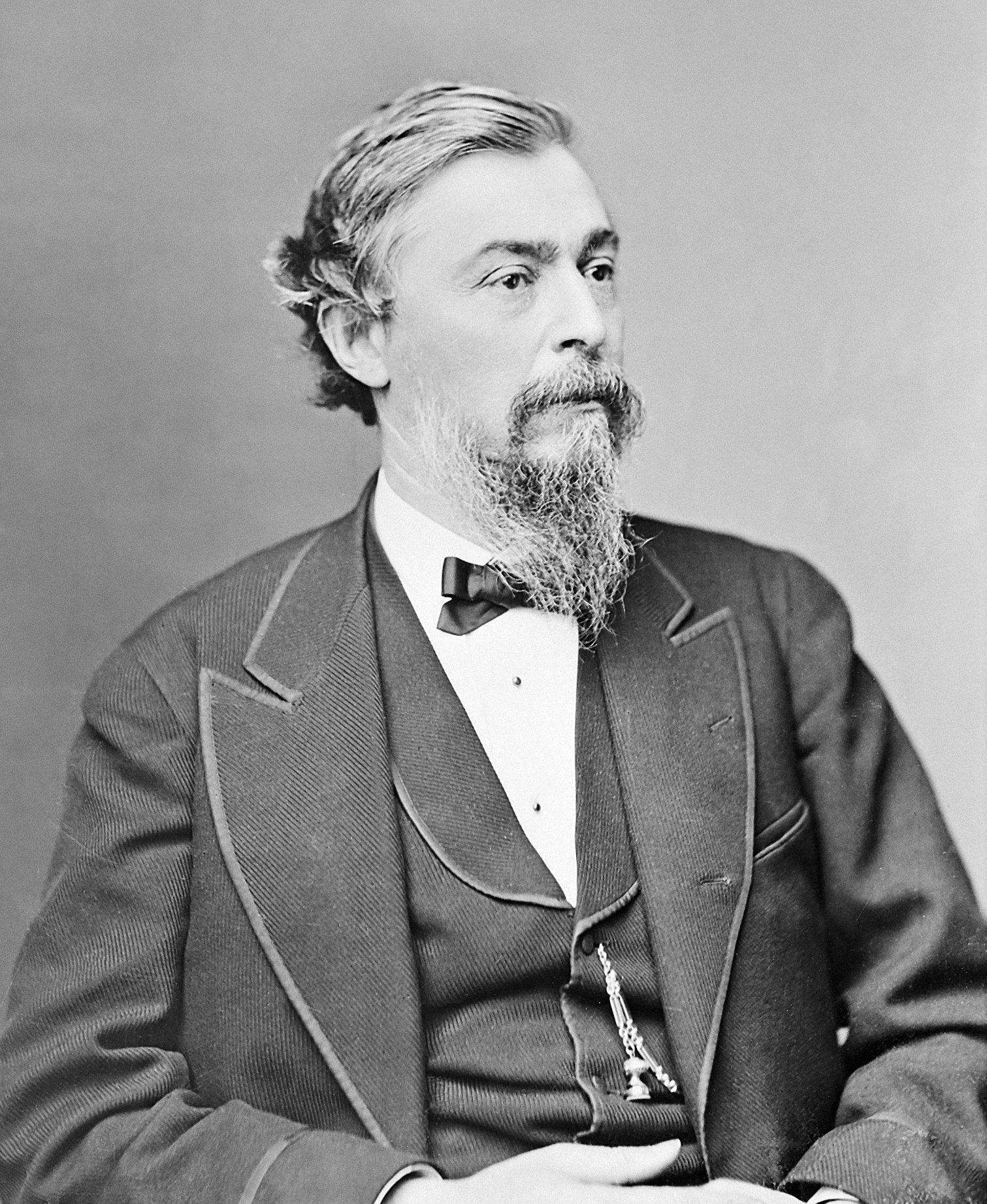
- Born: February 6, 1820; Lee, Massachusetts, US
- Died: October 5, 1885 (aged 65); Warren County, New York, US
- Resting place: Green-Wood Cemetery
- Education: Albany Medical College (1840)
- Occupations: Physician, businessman, investor
- Employer: Union Pacific Rail Road
- Known for: Crédit Mobilier scandal and vice president for railroads, Union Pacific Rail Road
- Spouse: Hannah Heloise Trimble
- Children: William West Durant; Héloïse Durant Rose

Thomas Clark Durant (February 6, 1820 – October 5, 1885) was an American medical doctor, businessman, and financier who played a central role in the formation of the Union Pacific Railroad. He was vice-president of the Union Pacific in 1869 when it met with the Central Pacific Railroad at Promontory Summit, Utah Territory. He created the financial structure that led to the Crédit Mobilier scandal. He was interested in hotels in the Adirondacks and once owned the schooner-yacht Idler, a successful America’s Cup defender.

He successfully built railroads in the Midwest. After an 1862 act of Congress created the UP, John A. Dix was elected president and Durant vice president of the company. Durant assumed the burden of management and money raising—and, with much money at his disposal, he helped secure the 1864 passage of a bill that increased the railroad's land grants and privileges. He organized, and at first controlled, the Crédit Mobilier of America, but in 1867 he lost control of the company to brothers Oliver and Oakes Ames. Durant continued on the directorate of the Union Pacific, however, and furiously pushed construction of the railroad until it met the Central Pacific RR on May 10, 1869. The Ames group then procured his discharge.

== Biography ==
Durant was born February 6, 1820, in Lee, Massachusetts. He studied medicine at Albany Medical College where, in 1840, he graduated cum laude and briefly served as assistant professor of surgery. After he retired from medicine, he became a director of his uncle's grain exporting company: Durant, Lathrop and Company in New York City.

While working with the prairie wheat trade, Durant realized the need for improved inland transportation, which led to his interest in the railroad industry. Durant started in the railroad industry as a broker for the Chicago and Rock Island Railroad. During that time, Durant became professionally acquainted with Henry Farnam.

The two men created a new contracting company under the name of Farnam and Durant. In 1853, they received a commission to raise capital and manage construction for the newly chartered Mississippi and Missouri Railroad (M&M). The M&M Railroad acquired major land grants to build Iowa's first railroad (planned to go from Davenport on the Mississippi River to Council Bluffs on the Missouri River).

The centerpiece of the M&M was a wooden railroad bridge, which, when completed in 1856, was the first bridge across the Mississippi River. The bridge linked the M&M to the Chicago and Rock Island Railroad. After a steamboat hit the bridge, boat operators sued to have the bridge dismantled. Durant and the Rock Island hired private attorney Abraham Lincoln to defend the bridge. This association played to Durant's favor in 1862, when President Lincoln selected Durant's new company, the Union Pacific, and its operation center in Council Bluffs, Iowa, as the starting point of the First transcontinental railroad.

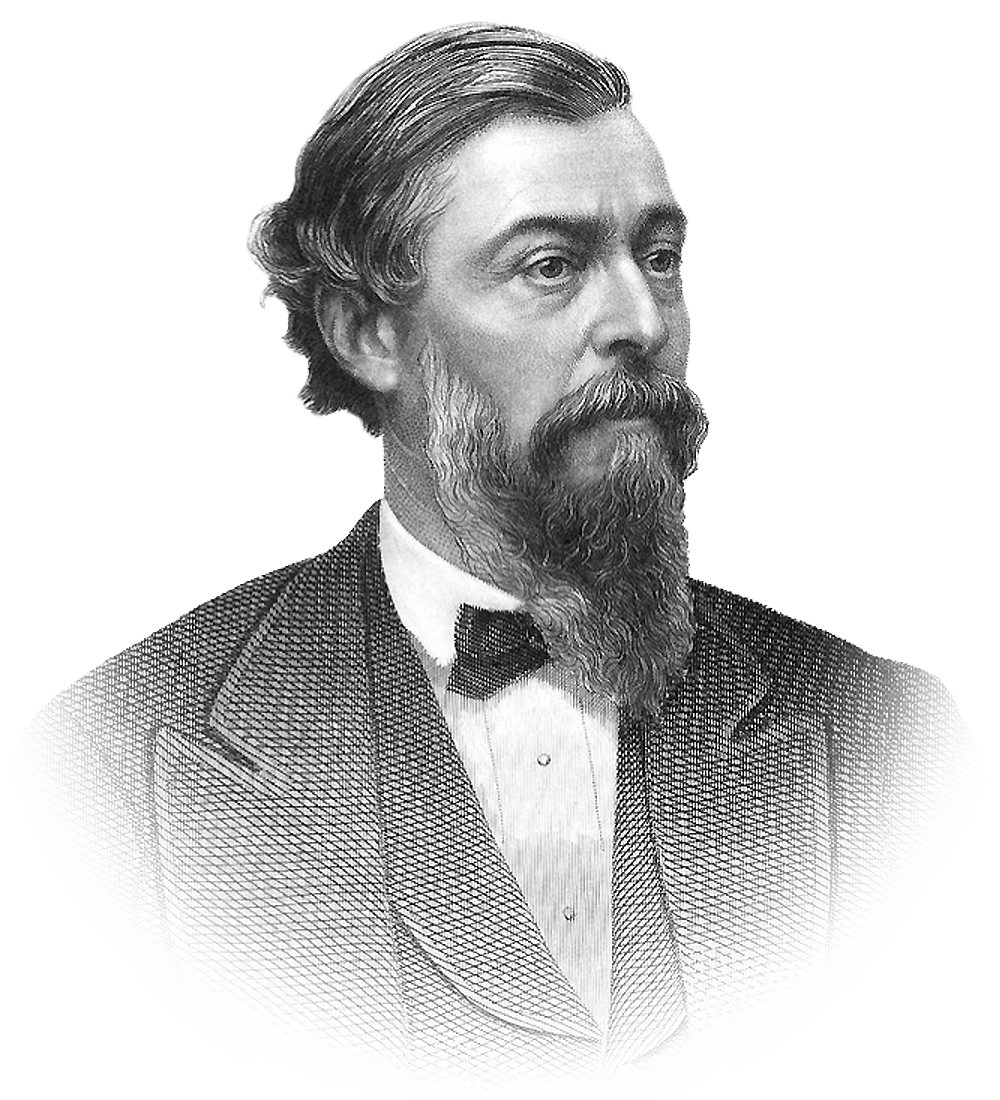
Steel engraving of Brady portrait of Thomas Durant

"Like Samson he would not hesitate to pull down the temple even if it meant burying himself along with his enemies." Durant had a ruthless reputation for squeezing friend and foe for personal gain. As general agent for the UP Eastern Division, Durant was also charged with raising money, acquiring resources, and securing favorable national legislation for the company. In addition to securing an enlarged land grant from Congress in 1864 as part of the legislature's subsidizing distribution of 100 million public acres, Durant effectively reacted to the Union Pacific's failure to sell significant stock in light of the Pacific Railroad Act of 1862 ruling that merchant holding would be limited to 200 shares per person. Proposing to finance the required ten percent down payment on stock himself, Durant campaigned to brokers and merchants in the New York and Philadelphia areas on the condition that he would be reimbursed at a later date. Persuading various politicians to invest as limited stockholders, amongst others, Durant successfully issued $2.18 million of UP stock to subscribers.

At the same time, Durant manipulated the stock market, running up the value of his M&M stock by saying he was going to connect the Transcontinental Railroad to it. He was secretly buying competing rail line stock, and then said the Transcontinental Railroad was going to go to that line.

Since the government paid for each mile of track laid, Durant overrode his engineers and ordered extra track laid in large oxbows. In the first 2 1/2 years, the Union Pacific did not extend further than 40 miles (64 km) from Omaha, Nebraska. As the federal government was waging the Civil War, Durant avoided its oversight on railroad construction.

During the Civil War, Durant made a fortune smuggling contraband cotton from the Confederate States with the help of General Grenville M. Dodge. When the war ended in 1865, the Union Pacific put extra labor on. It completed nearly two thirds of the transcontinental route. Durant employed Dodge as the chief engineer along the Platte River route.

One of Durant's biggest coups was the creation of Crédit Mobilier of America. Durant and entrepreneur George Francis Train joined in March 1864 to form a business venture to buy out the Pennsylvania Fiscal Agency, changing its name to Crédit Mobilier. The company was one of the first to take advantage of the new limited liability financial structures. Previously, investors were responsible for the finances of a company if it had problems. Under limited liability, their only responsibility was for money paid in. Durant created this limited liability company to encourage UP investors to agree to take on the railroad's construction after contracted employee Herbert Hoxie announced that he would fail to meet his deadline for building 247 miles of track. Investors thought that this contract, given the high construction cost, was too great a risk, but the protection offered by Crédit Mobilier convinced them to take on the construction. Durant then manipulated Crédit Mobilier's structure so that he wound up in control of it. UP was effectively paying him via Crédit Mobilier to build the railroad. Durant concealed his actions by having various politicians, including future President James Garfield, as limited stockholders. Things got worse for Durant when it came clear that he had violated the 1862 Pacific Railroad Act by using his control of the Crédit Mobilier to become the majority stockholder in the Union Pacific Railroad. There was also suspicion that Durant had taken money from the company, yet it seems that his co-workers were too fearful of him to meet clandestinely to discuss this possibility. Durant's control at Crédit Mobilier was challenged after Oakes Ames took Durant to court and fired him from Crédit Mobilier in May 1867. Ames had been a member of the United States House of Representatives from Massachusetts and assisted Durant in bribing congressmen and other government officials. In 1867 Durant was ousted from his position managing Crédit Mobilier. President Ulysses S. Grant fired Durant from Union Pacific. The Crédit Mobilier company had been increasingly associated with corruption and secrecy and the government was fed up with not being paid back for loans and the swindling that went on at each company.

Like many others, Durant lost a great deal of his wealth in the Panic of 1873. He sold his remaining stock in Union Pacific and started a new railroad company, Adirondack Railroad. He spent the last twelve years of his life fighting lawsuits from disgruntled partners and investors.

== Marriage and family ==
Durant was married to Hannah Heloise Trimble. They had two children: William West Durant, who became an architect, and Héloïse Durant Rose (c.1853–1943), who became an author, playwright, and literary critic.

In 1873 Durant summoned his family home to rebuild their fortune in the Adirondack Wilderness, where he had accumulated a half a million acres of land. His vision was to open up the wilderness to tourists and as a destination for the wealthy to own second homes. At the time, he owned the Adirondack Railroad and was seeking investors to continue the track from North Creek, New York, on into Canada. He tasked his son William with pioneering the venture, though, according to William, he maintained ultimate control. William set his sights on his own architectural vision for the region and was instrumental in developing the first Great Camp architecture. Father and son encouraged wealthy investors to visit their Camp Pine Knot, entertaining them lavishly. William's camps Pine Knot, Uncas and Sagamore were eventually sold to Collis P. Huntington, J.P. Morgan and Alfred Vanderbilt.

Héloïse attended private schools in Europe and the United States, and was fluent in Arabic, French, German, and Italian. She became an American author, playwright, and book reviewer for The New York Times, and she wrote in addition to articles and plays essays, poems, and short stories. Her dramatic poem Dante (1910) was translated into Italian and is believed to be the first American play produced on the Italian stage. Additionally, Héloïse founded the Dante League in 1917 "for popular propaganda for the study of Dante" and was a signatory of the "Memorial to the Columbia College Board of Trustees", an 1883 petition to allow female students to attend lectures and examinations at Columbia College. (Other prominent signers included Susan B. Anthony, Caroline Sterling Choate, Chauncey M. Depew, Parke Godwin, Emma Lazarus, Josephine Shaw Lowell, Theodore Roosevelt, Georgina Schuyler, and Charles Comfort Tiffany.)

== Death ==
Durant died in Warren County, New York, on October 5, 1885. He is buried in Green-Wood Cemetery in Brooklyn, New York.

== Legacy and honors ==
- Durant, Iowa, was named after him.
  - Additionally, he endowed that eastern Iowa community with several hundred dollars to establish the first school there; today, the school is also named after him.
- He achieved the construction of a wooden railroad bridge in 1856, the first to cross the Mississippi River.
- Durant, Polk County, Nebraska, is an unincorporated community in the United States that was established when the Union Pacific Railroad was extended to that point, during the building of the First transcontinental railroad.
- In 1870, Durant was elected a Fellow of the American Society of Civil Engineers.

== In popular culture ==
- Forrest Fyre portrayed Durant in the mini-series, Into the West (2005), in episode 4, "Hell On Wheels".
- Colm Meaney portrayed a fictionalized version of Durant, who is a main character, in the AMC television program Hell on Wheels. The series portrayed the UP's construction of the eastern portion of the First Transcontinental Railroad. Additionally, Virginia Madsen played a fictionalized version of Hannah Durant, in the second season.
- Eric Rolland portrayed Durant in The American West.
- Durant's family life is fictionalized in the novel Imaginary Brightness: a Durant Family Saga.
- The A&E and Netflix original program Longmire takes place in the fictional town of Durant, Wyoming.
