= Wells Baptist Church =

Historic church in New York, United States

- U.S. National Register of Historic Places
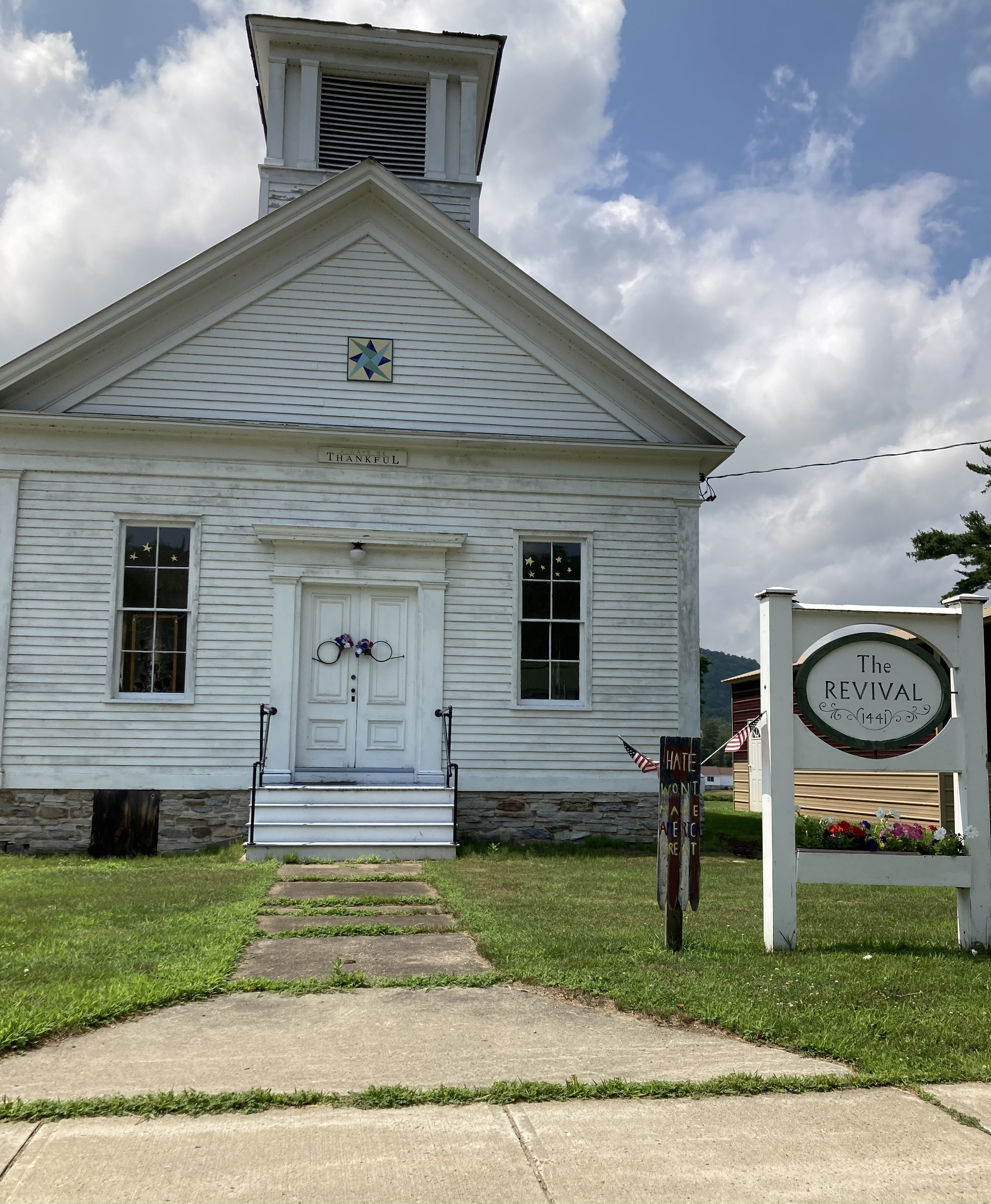

- Location within New York Location within the United States
- Location: Main St., Wells, New York
- Coordinates: 43°24′2″N 74°17′16″W
- Area: less than one acre
- Built: 1845
- Architectural style: Greek Revival
- NRHP reference No.: 88001440
- Added to NRHP: September 01, 1988

Wells Baptist Church is a historic Baptist church on Main Street in Wells, Hamilton County, New York. It was built in 1845 and is a single-story, three-by-four-bay, post and beam frame building measuring approximately 36 by 41 feet (11 by 12 m). It sits on an uncoursed mortared rubble foundation and has a gable roof. The main facade features a tympanum surmounted by a louvered bell tower topped by a pyramidal roof.

The church closed in 1949 and became owned by the Hamilton County Historical Society. It was added to the National Register of Historic Places in 1988. In 2012, it was sold to private individuals, who renovated it as a community center. As of 2025 it was operated as a private event venue called the Revival.
