= Crédit Mobilier scandal =

American political scandal

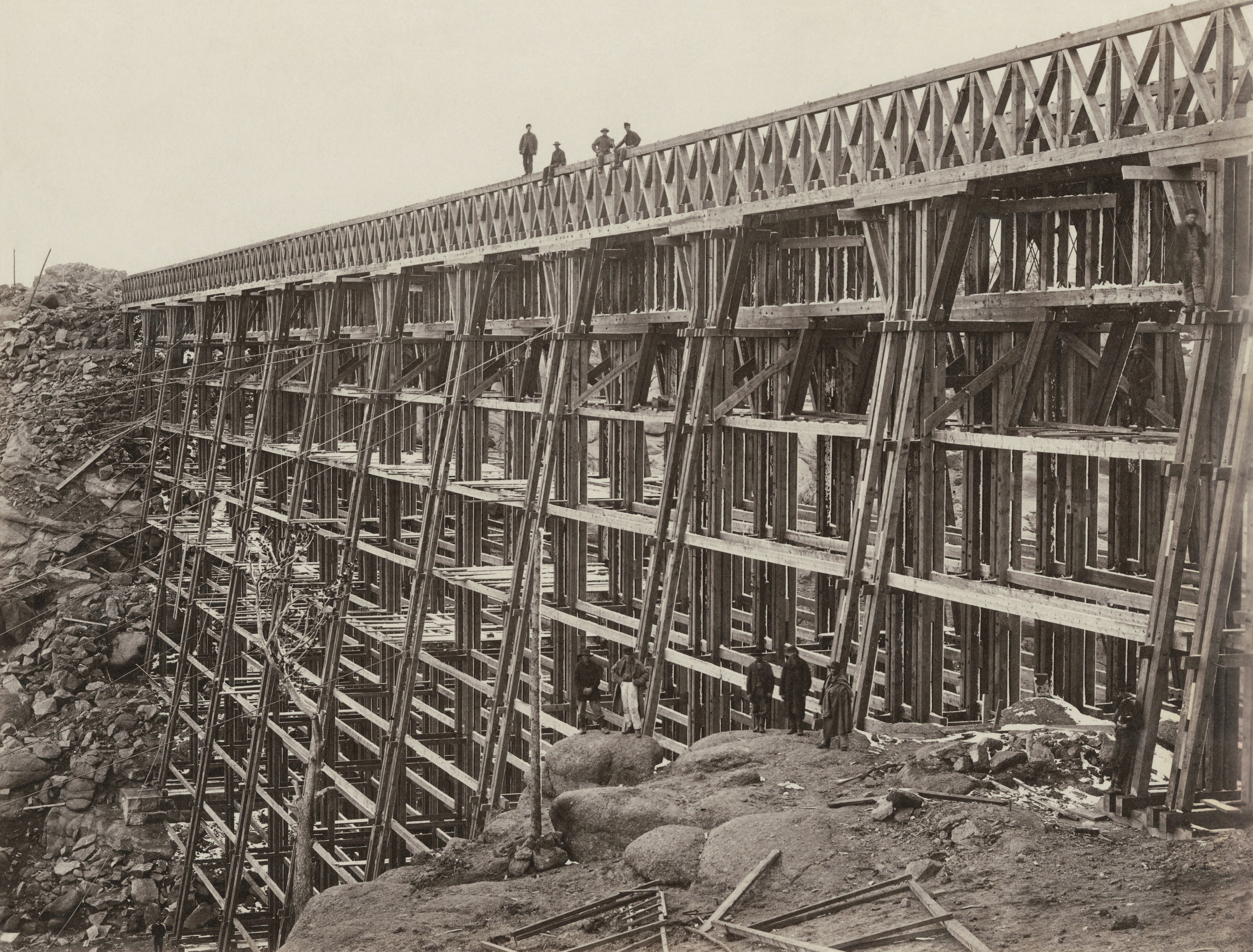
Dale Creek Crossing, completed in 1868 as part of the First transcontinental railroad

The Crédit Mobilier scandal (French pronunciation: [kʁedi mɔbilje]) was a two-part fraud conducted from 1864 to 1867 by the Union Pacific Railroad and the Crédit Mobilier of America construction company in the building of the eastern portion of the first transcontinental railroad from the Missouri River to the Utah Territory. The story was broken by The New York Sun during the 1872 campaign of Ulysses S. Grant.

A new company, Crédit Mobilier of America, was created by Union Pacific executives to actually build the line, but at inflated construction costs. Though the railroad cost only $50 million to build (equal to $1.2 billion today), Crédit Mobilier billed $94 million and Union Pacific executives pocketed the excess $44 million. Part of the excess cash and $9 million in discounted stock was then used to bribe several Washington politicians for laws, funding, and regulatory rulings favorable to the Union Pacific.

The scandal negatively affected the careers of many politicians and nearly bankrupted Union Pacific. For years afterward, partisan newspapers used the scandal to create Gilded Age public distrust of Republicans, Congress, and the federal government.

== Background ==
The scandal's origins dated to 1864, when the Union Pacific Railroad was chartered by Congress and the associated corporation Crédit Mobilier of America was established. This company had no relation to the major French bank Crédit Mobilier.

In the Pacific Railroad Acts of 1864–68, Congress authorized and chartered the Union Pacific Railroad and provided $100 million (approximately $2.2 billion in 2025) in capital investment to complete a transcontinental line west from the Missouri River to the Pacific coast. The federal government offered to assist the railroad with a loan of $16,000 to $48,000 per mile of track, variable according to location, for a total of more than $60 million in all, and a land grant of 20,000,000 acres (8,100,000 ha), worth $50 to $100 million.

The offer initially attracted no subscribers for additional financing, as the conditions were financially daunting.

=== Obstacles to investment ===
The railroad would have to be built for 1,750 miles (2,820 km) through desert and mountains, incurring extremely high freight costs for supplies. There was the high risk of armed conflict with hostile tribes of Native Americans, who occupied many territories in the interior, and no probable early business to pay dividends.

There was no existing demand for railroad freight or passenger traffic for virtually the entire proposed route. Since no towns or cities of any size yet existed on the western prairies, there was no commercial activity between Nebraska and the California border. Nor were there any branch lines running either north or south of the proposed route that would have been able to feed their traffic to a new transcontinental railway. As a result, private investors refused to invest.

In spite of this, the entire railroad scheme was proposed as a "going concern" – a financially viable enterprise that relied on "below-market" financing and then could continue to function as a business enterprise, covering its operating expenses with freight and passenger revenues while providing profits for investors and interest payments to the US government for the borrowed capital (at the federal rate based upon the U.S. government bond rates), and ultimately retiring its debt to the U.S. government.

=== Opposition ===
Opponents of the Pacific Railroad Acts felt the construction and its routing were being developed without regard for creating a viable and profitable transportation enterprise. They believed the whole project was a bare-faced fraud by some capitalists to build a "railroad to nowhere" and to make tremendous profits doing so, while getting the United States government to bear the costs.

== Formation of Crédit Mobilier of America ==
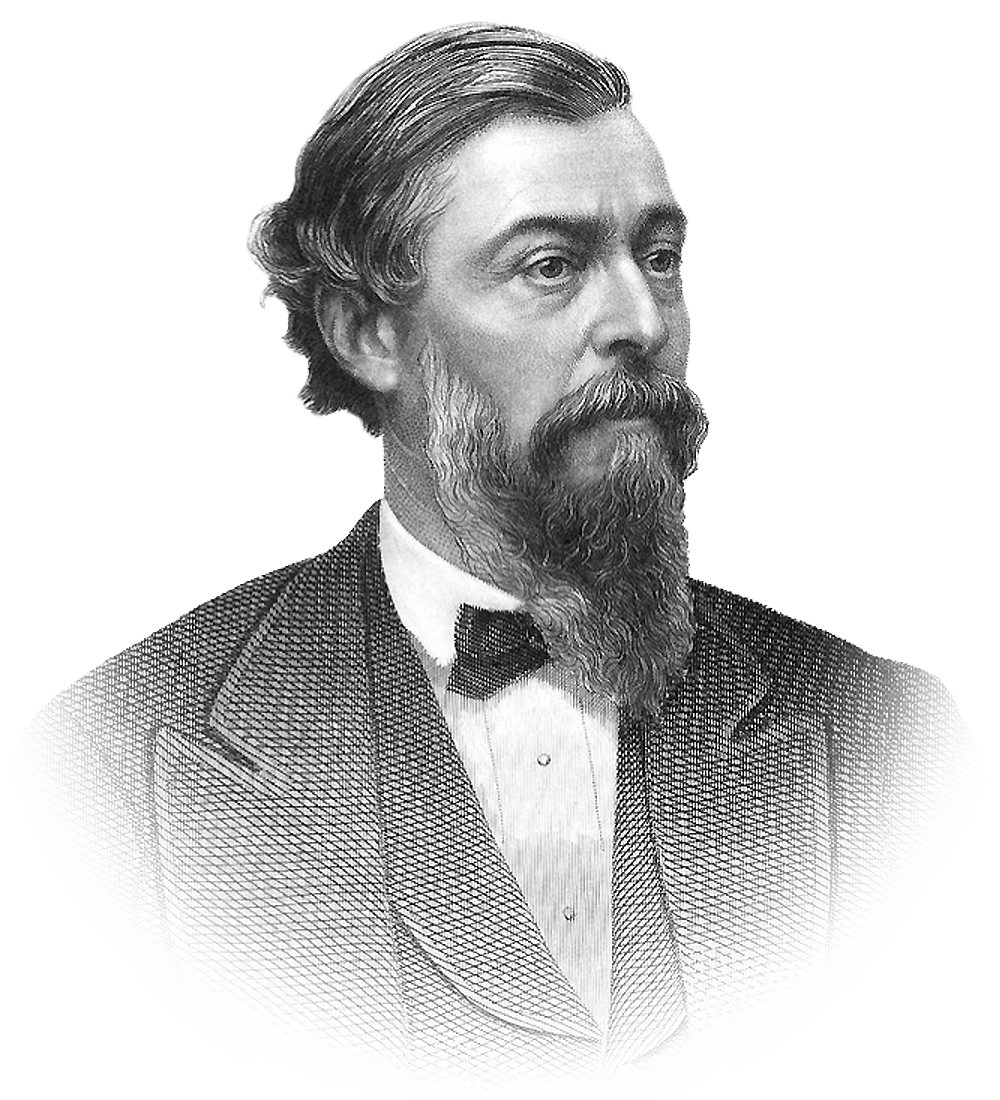
Thomas Durant, one of the founders of the Credit Mobilier company

George Francis Train and Thomas C. Durant, the vice president of the Union Pacific Rail Road, formed Crédit Mobilier of America in 1864.

Crédit Mobilier of America was a deliberate façade. Train and Durant aimed to present to both the government and to the public the appearance that an independent corporate enterprise had been impartially chosen as the principal contractor and construction management firm for the project. In fact, Crédit Mobilier was created to shield the company's shareholders and management from the common charge that they were using the construction phase of the project, as opposed to the operating phase, to generate profit. Because the conspirators believed they could not expect conventional profits from the operation of the railroad, they created the sham company so they could charge the U.S. government extortionate fees and expenses during the construction phase.

== Allegations ==
In simplified terms, the scheme worked as follows:

- The Union Pacific contracted with Crédit Mobilier to build the railway at rates greatly above cost. However the UP usually paid with UP shares, which were not highly rated because of the uncertainty that the huge project could be completed and would generate future profits.
- The railroad was eventually a success and made money from selling land. Thus it eventually brought high profits to Crédit Mobilier, which was owned by Durant and the Union Pacific's other directors and principal stockholders.
- The outsize profits were divided among the Union Pacific stockholders.

The directors of the Union Pacific also engaged in stock manipulation, circumventing requirements that they receive full payment for stock issued at par by instead paying Crédit Mobilier in bank checks, which Crédit Mobilier then used to purchase Union Pacific stock.

In every major construction contract drawn up between the Union Pacific and Crédit Mobilier, the contract's terms, conditions, and price were offered and accepted through the actions of the same corporate officers and directors, operating on both sides of the contract. The underlying fraud of a common and unified ownership of two companies that shared principal officers and directors was not revealed for years.

=== Coverup ===
The principal means of the scheme was the method of indirect billing.

The Union Pacific presented genuine and accurate invoices to the U.S. government as evidence of actual construction costs billed to them by Crédit Mobilier of America for payment. Any audit of the Union Pacific invoices to the government would have revealed no evidence of fraud or profiteering, because the fraud took place one level deeper, on the invoices from Crédit Mobilier to Union Pacific. Union Pacific was accepting for payment genuine Crédit Mobilier invoices (based on fraudulent accounting) and was applying only an overhead expense for management and administration.

If the Union Pacific's corporate officers had openly undertaken the management and construction of the railroad, this scheme to make windfall profits immediately from charges made during construction would have been exposed to public scrutiny by the opponents of the railroad project from the start.

=== Extent ===
The Union Pacific contracted at inflated prices with Crédit Mobilier to build the railway. The UP paid by check, and Crédit Mobilier used the checks to buy Union Pacific stock and bonds at par value. Crédit Mobilier then sold the UP stock and bonds on the open market, which resulted in a substantial gain for Crédit Mobilier. These inflated construction contracts and securities sales brought in enormous profits, which Crédit Mobilier split with the Union Pacific's directors and principal stockholders, who also owned Crédit Mobilier.

The result of these machinations was that the U.S. Congress paid $94,650,287 to the Union Pacific and $50,720,959 to Crédit Mobilier. The arrangement between the Union Pacific and Crédit Mobilier thus generated $43,929,328 in profits for Crédit Mobilier (equivalent to over $1.1 billion in 2025). Crédit Mobilier directors reported this as a cash profit of only $23,366,319.81, which amounted to a serious financial misrepresentation, since the same directors were the recipients of the undisclosed $20,563,010 that represented the Union Pacific's share of the profits.

== Bribery ==
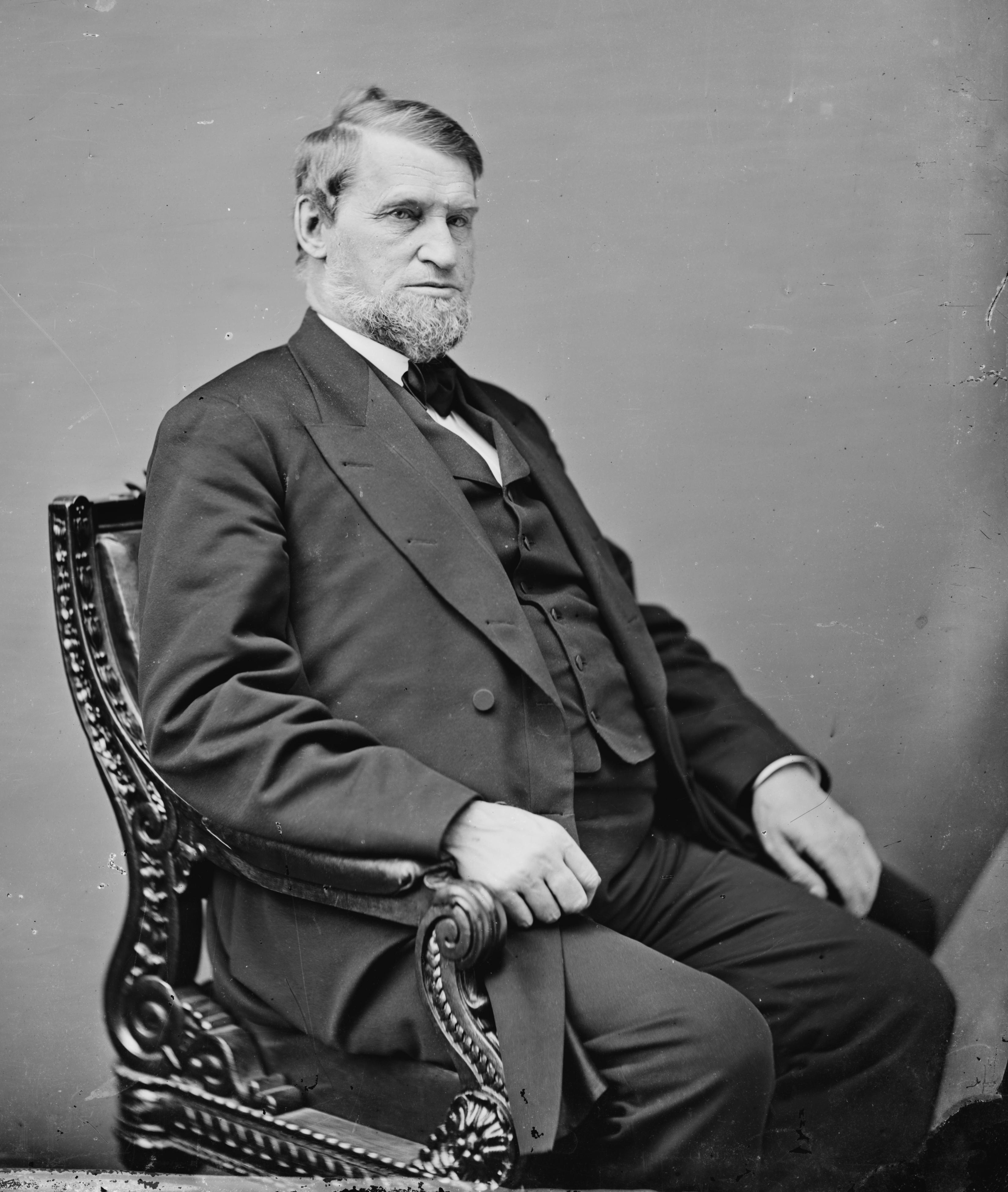
Oakes Ames

Historian Maury Klein, in his wide-ranging analysis of the scandal, boiled down the issue: "Did the builders of the road defraud the government? And did they attempt to gain influence in Congress through bribery? The evidence suggested that the answer to the first was no, and to the second a qualified yes."

In 1867, Crédit Mobilier replaced Thomas Durant with Oakes Ames, a member of the House of Representatives from Massachusetts. Ames, being a member of Congress, distributed bribes in the form of cash and discounted shares of Crédit Mobilier stock to fellow congressmen and other politicians in exchange for votes and actions favorable to the Union Pacific. Ames offered to members of Congress shares in Crédit Mobilier at its discounted par value rather than the market value, which was much higher due to its superb (but fraudulent) profits and exclusive contract with the Union Pacific Railroad. It also declared substantial quarterly dividends on its stock.

Those allowed to purchase shares at par value could reap enormous capital gains simply by offering these discounted shares on the market, knowing that they would be purchased at a higher price by investors desiring to own stock in such a profitable company.

== Revelation and political impact ==
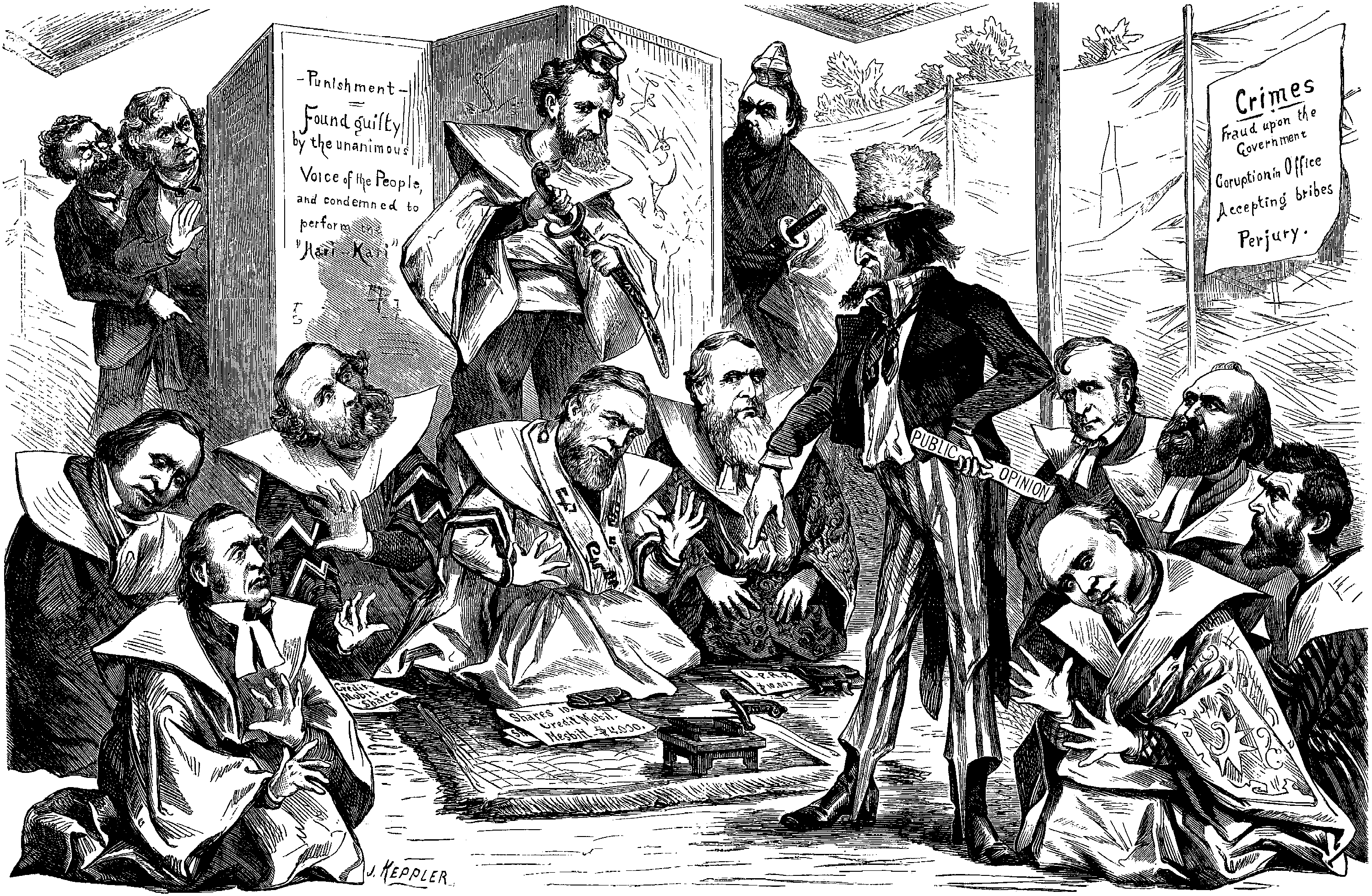
A political cartoon in which Uncle Sam directs Congressmen implicated in the scandal (depicted as Samurai) to commit "Hari-Kari" [sic] (ritual suicide), 1873

Following a serious disagreement between Ames and his associate Henry Simpson McComb, McComb leaked compromising letters to The New York Sun, a reformist newspaper which was highly critical of incumbent President Ulysses S. Grant and his administration.

On September 4, 1872, the Sun broke the story. The newspaper reported that Crédit Mobilier had received $72 million in contracts for building a railroad worth only $53 million.

After the revelations, the Union Pacific and other investors were left nearly bankrupt.

=== Congressional investigation ===
In 1872, the House of Representatives submitted the names of nine politicians to the Senate for investigation. Both the House and Senate were Republican:

- Representative William B. Allison of Iowa
- Former Senator James A. Bayard Jr. of Delaware
- Former Representative George S. Boutwell of Massachusetts (then serving as United States Secretary of the Treasury)
- Senator Roscoe Conkling of New York
- Senator James Harlan of Iowa (retiring)
- Senator John Logan of Illinois
- Representative James W. Patterson of New Hampshire
- Senator Henry Wilson of Massachusetts, also Grant's current running mate for Vice President
- Vice President Schuyler Colfax

Both houses of Congress were Republican controlled, and yet all of those named were Republicans except Bayard, a Democrat who was largely dropped from the investigation after he wrote a letter disavowing any knowledge.

Ultimately, Congress investigated 13 of its members in a probe that led to the censure of Oakes Ames and James Brooks, a Democrat from New York.

During the 1872 campaign, Grant's running mate Henry Wilson initially denied involvement. However, in the February 1873 Senate investigation, Wilson admitted involvement and provided a complicated explanation claiming he had paid for stock in his wife's name, and with her money but had never taken possession of the shares. According to Wilson, when his wife (and later he himself) had concerns about the transaction, the transaction was reversed. Wilson's wife had died in 1870, so senators had to rely on Wilson's word and that of Ames, whose account corroborated Wilson's. The Senate accepted Wilson's explanation, and took no action against him, but his reputation for integrity was somewhat damaged because of his initial denial.

Senator Henry L. Dawes of Massachusetts was also implicated. Dawes had purchased $1,000 in stock and had received a dividend. Dawes later had doubts about the propriety of the stock purchase and cancelled it. Ames returned the purchase price to Dawes with interest and Dawes returned the dividend to Ames. Dawes received $100 in interest on his returned purchase price, but he was not further implicated.

=== Department of Justice investigation ===
A Department of Justice investigation was also conducted, with Aaron F. Perry appointed as chief counsel. During the investigation, the government found that the company had given shares to more than 30 politicians from both parties, including Colfax, Patterson, Wilson, and then House Representative James A. Garfield.

No charges were filed against any of the participants in the scandal. Garfield denied any wrongdoing and went on to be elected president in 1880.

== In popular culture ==
The scheme was referenced in the AMC television series Hell on Wheels (2011–2016), in which Thomas Durant features as a recurring character, portrayed by actor Colm Meaney.

The scheme and scandal was proposed as a topic for a musical cabaret in the third episode of the tenth season of the FXX television series Archer.

== See also ==
- Crédit Mobilier, a bank in France that had no connection to the American company or the scandal
- Grantism
