= Great Camp Sagamore =

- Sagamore Lodge
- U.S. National Register of Historic Places
- U.S. National Historic Landmark
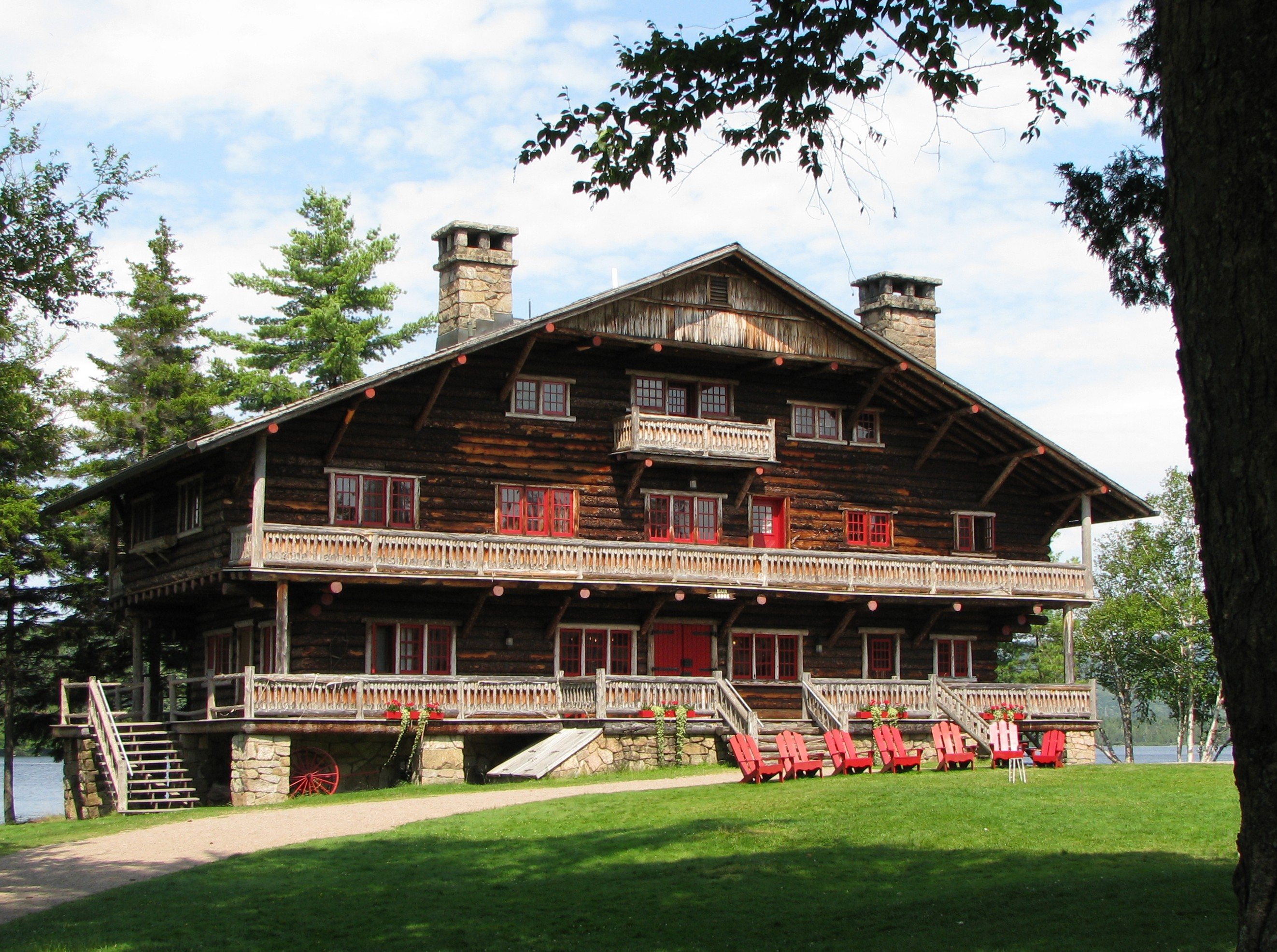
- Great Camp Sagamore
- Nearest city: Raquette Lake, New York
- Coordinates: 43°45′55.65″N 74°37′38.25″W
- Built: 1897
- Architect: William West Durant
- NRHP reference No.: 76001221

Significant dates
- Added to NRHP: January 11, 1976
- Designated NHL: May 16, 2000

Great Camp Sagamore is an Adirondack Great Camp located on Sagamore Lake in the Adirondack Mountains of northern New York State.

== History ==
Great Camp Sagamore was constructed by William West Durant on Sagamore Lake between 1895 and 1897. Prior to Sagamore, William Durant had constructed Camp Pine Knot (purchased by Collis P. Huntington and now the Huntington Memorial Outdoor Education Center ) on nearby Raquette Lake and Camp Uncas (once owned by J. P. Morgan) on Lake Mohegan. All three camps are still in use today.

The camp is arranged in two complexes a half-mile apart, the Upper, or worker's complex, and the Lower, or guest complex. The guests would not have frequented the worker's complex, as the buildings at the Upper complex are much more utilitarian than those in the Guest complex, and without the embellishment of the buildings designed for entertaining. Sagamore served as a sylvan setting in which the richest families in America could relax, party, and get a feeling of returning to nature. All of this, however, was accomplished without leaving the comforts of civilization behind.

In 1901 Durant was forced to sell Sagamore because a lawsuit by his sister over his mismanagement of their mother's estate had pushed him to the edge of bankruptcy. It was purchased by Alfred Gwynne Vanderbilt, who expanded and improved the property to include flush toilets, a sewer system and hot and cold running water. He later added a hydroelectric plant and an outdoor bowling alley with an ingenious system for retrieving the balls. Other amenities included a tennis court, a croquet lawn, a 100,000 gallon reservoir, and a working farm. Vanderbilt died in 1915, a victim of the Lusitania sinking, leaving Sagamore to his widow Margaret Emerson, an avid sportswoman who continued to occupy the camp seasonally for many years.

Mrs. Emerson transferred the property to Syracuse University, which operated a conference center at the site until the State of New York offered to buy it. Acquisition by the State as part of the Forest Preserve would have required demolition of the historic buildings, because of the "Forever Wild" provision of the New York State Constitution. To avert this, the Preservation League of New York State arranged with the State to take title, transferring the property with deed restrictions to a not-for-profit institution that would provide suitable occupancy. Great Camp Sagamore has continued to function as an education institution dedicated to the preservation of the National Historic Landmark.

A portion of Sagamore was listed on the National Register of Historic Places in 1976. A boundary increase for additional area was included in a multiple property submission for listing in 1986. The camp was designated as a National Historic Landmark on 16 May 2000. The historic camp is now run by Sagamore Institute of the Adirondacks, Inc. and is open to the public by guided tour, as well as offering accommodations and educational programming May through October.

== See also ==
- List of National Historic Landmarks in New York
- National Register of Historic Places listings in Hamilton County, New York
