= Camp Uncas =

- U.S. National Register of Historic Places
- U.S. National Historic Landmark
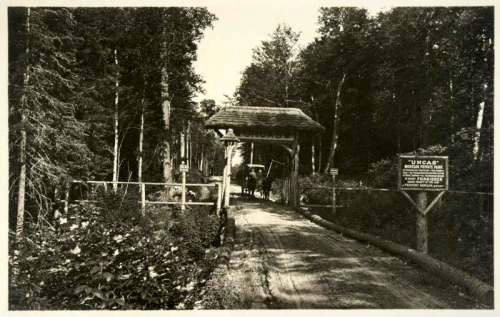
- Camp Uncas gate in 1899

- Location within New York Location within the United States
- Nearest city: Raquette Lake, New York
- Coordinates: 43°44′38″N 74°38′53″W
- Built: 1893
- Architect: William West Durant
- MPS: Great Camps of the Adirondacks TR
- NRHP reference No.: 86002937

Significant dates
- Added to NRHP: April 3, 1987
- Designated NHL: October 7, 2008

Camp Uncas is an Adirondack Great Camp, the second built by William West Durant for his own use. It lies on the shore of 110-acre (45 ha) Lake Mohegan, near Great Camp Sagamore, and was completed in two years.

Previously Durant had built Camp Pine Knot, which he sold to industrialist Collis P. Huntington, due to financial difficulties.

== History ==
The camp was built of logs felled on the property, and all iron hardware was forged on site. In the main lodge and dining hall, the log construction was unusual in that the logs were not interlocked, as in conventional log buildings, but rather were pinned together at beveled corners. The scale is massive: the dining hall is 24-by-36-foot (7.3 by 11.0 m), the walls 12 feet (3.7 m) high at the eaves with a cathedral ceiling 20 feet (6.1 m) high at the ridge, with a huge fireplace on one side. Floors, walls and ceilings were all of polished planks and peeled and polished natural logs.

In 1896, Durant sold Uncas to J. Pierpont Morgan with 1,100 acres (450 ha). After Morgan's death in 1913, the camp stayed in the Morgan family until 1947, when it was sold to the widow of Alfred Gwynne Vanderbilt, who also owned Sagamore. General and Mrs. George Marshall, as guests of Mrs. Vanderbilt, entertained Madame Chiang Kai-shek at Uncas in 1949. Mrs. Vanderbilt left Uncas to a foundation, which sold it; eventually it was bought by the Rockland County Boy Scouts who used it as a camp. In 1975, it was returned to private use.

The camp was included in a multiple property submission for listing on the National Register of Historic Places in 1986, and was listed there in 1987. The camp was designated a National Historic Landmark on October 7, 2008.

== Sources ==
- Gilborn, Craig. Durant: Fortunes and Woodland Camps of a Family in the Adirondacks. Utica, NY: North Country Books, 1981.
- Gilborn, Craig. Adirondack Camps: Homes Away from Home, 1850-1950. Blue Mountain Lake, NY: Adirondack Museum; Syracuse: Syracuse University Press, 2000.
- Kaiser, Harvey. Great Camps of the Adirondacks. Boston: David R. Godine, 1982.
