= Camp Pine Knot =

- U.S. National Register of Historic Places
- U.S. National Historic Landmark
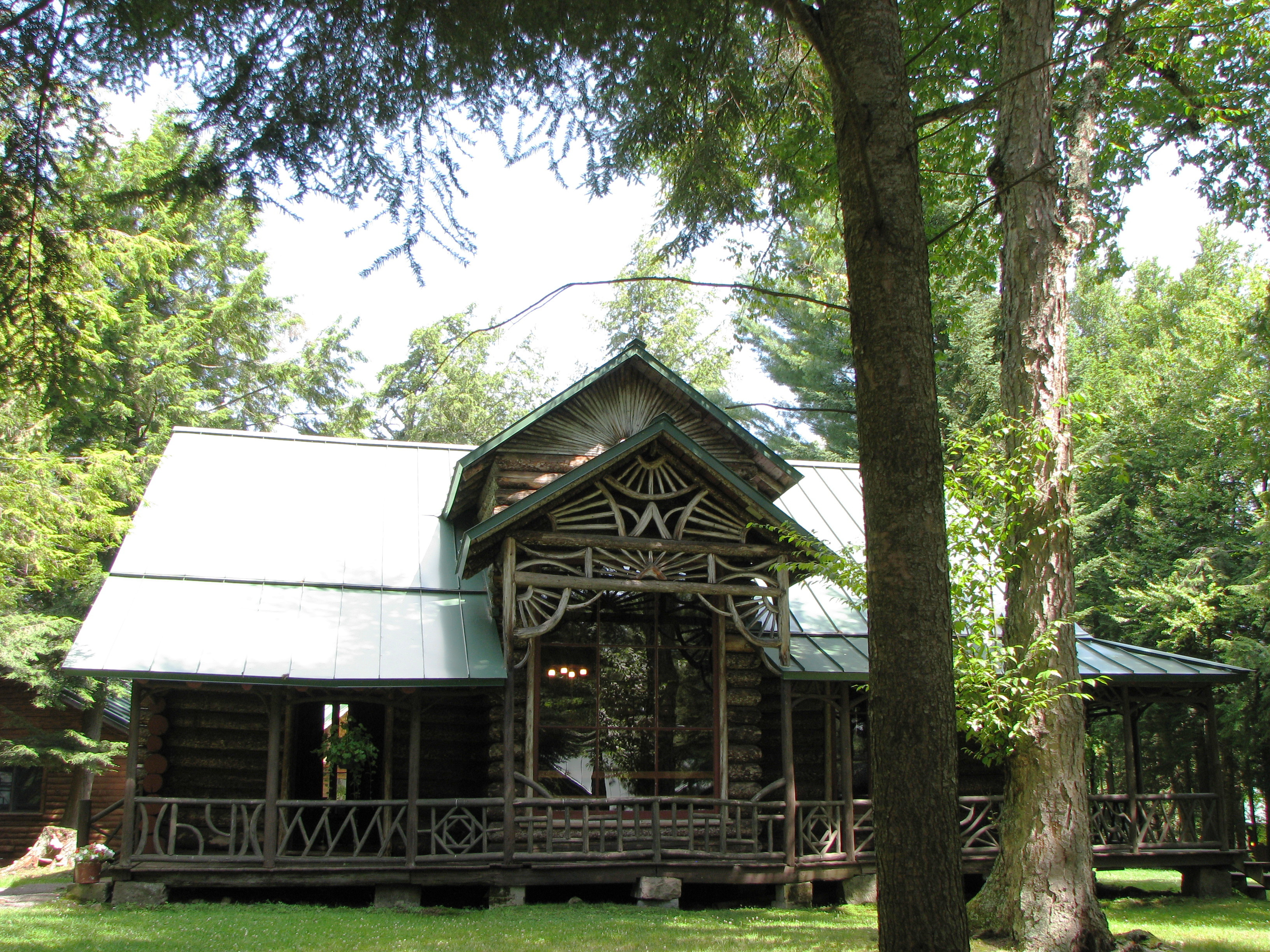
- The "W" is for William West Durant

- Location within New York Adirondack Park Location within New York Location within the United States
- Location: Raquette Lake, NY
- Coordinates: 43°49′16.77″N 74°37′34.31″W
- Built: 1877
- Architect: William West Durant
- Architectural style: Adirondack Great Camp
- MPS: Great Camps of the Adirondacks TR
- NRHP reference No.: 86002934

Significant dates
- Added to NRHP: November 7, 1986
- Designated NHL: August 18, 2004

Camp Pine Knot, also known as Huntington Memorial Camp, is a Great Camp on Raquette Lake in the Adirondack Mountains of New York. Constructed in 1877 by William West Durant, it was the first of the Adirondack "Great Camps" and epitomizes the architectural style. Elements include log and native stonework construction, decorative rustic items of branches and twigs, and layout as a compound of separated structures. It is located on the southwest tip of Long Point, a two-mile long point extending into Raquette Lake, in Long Lake, New York.

The camp consists of some two dozen buildings, including a seven-room "Swiss Cottage," four "Log Cottages" of one to three rooms, two frame cottages of three and five rooms, a "Glass Dining Room," and a five-stall horse barn and wagon shed. Covered walkways connect many of the buildings. There was also the "Barque," a 20 by 60 foot four-room bark cabin built on a log raft; it was fully equipped with a kitchen, bath, and running water.

== History ==
Pine Knot was started by railroad developer Thomas C. Durant as a showplace to draw investors to Durant's holdings, and his son William West Durant developed the site into a model for Adirondack Great Camps. In 1895, William sold the camp to Collis P. Huntington, who died there in 1900.

The camp went unused from the start of the 20th century until 1947, when it was sold to the State University of New York at Cortland for 1 dollar, for use as their outdoor education center. Due to the soundness of its construction, despite its long disuse, the buildings required little repair. The Barque is being rebuilt.

The camp was listed on the National Register of Historic Places in 1986 and was declared a National Historic Landmark in 2004.

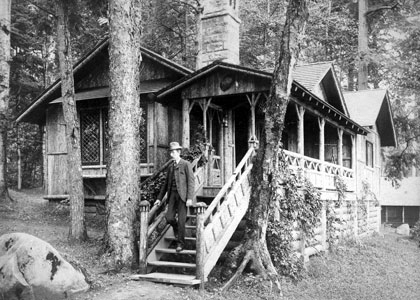
William West Durant at Camp Pine Knot, 1890. Image by Seneca Ray Stoddard

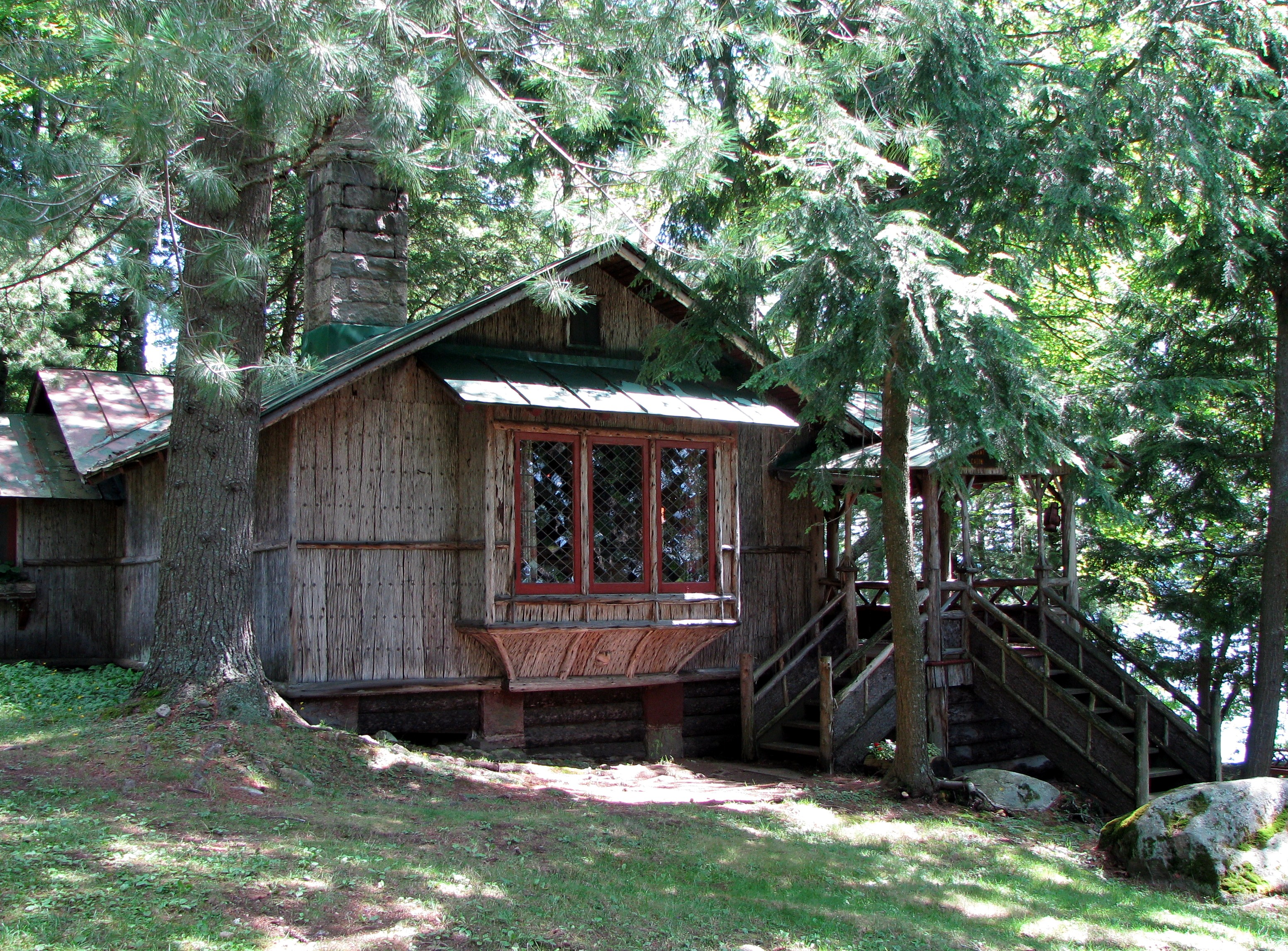
Durant Cabin, 2009

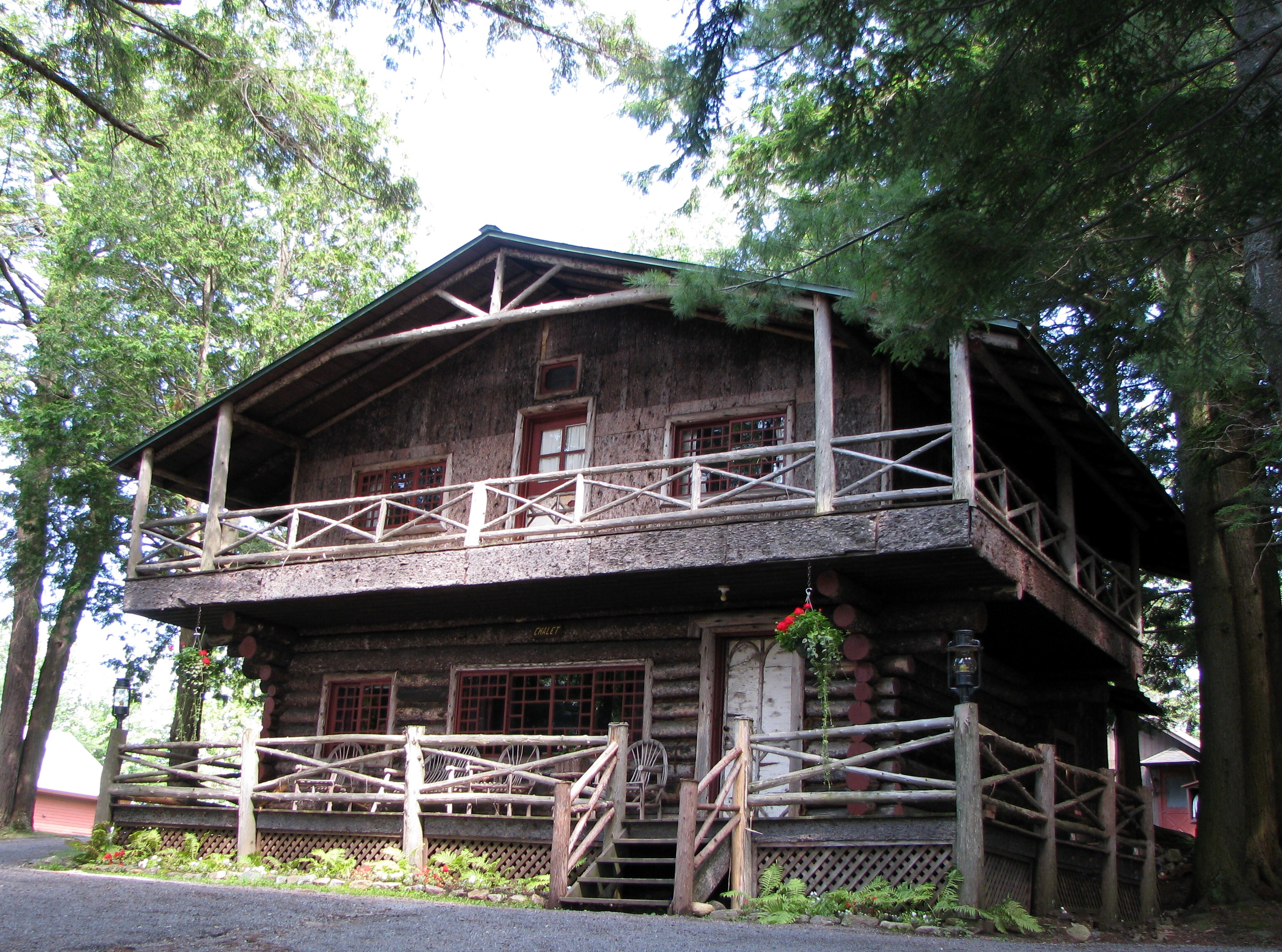
The Chalet, 2009

== See also ==
- List of National Historic Landmarks in New York
- National Register of Historic Places listings in Hamilton County, New York
