= Raquette Lake, New York =

Hamlet in New York, United States

Coordinates: 43°48′47″N 74°39′27″W

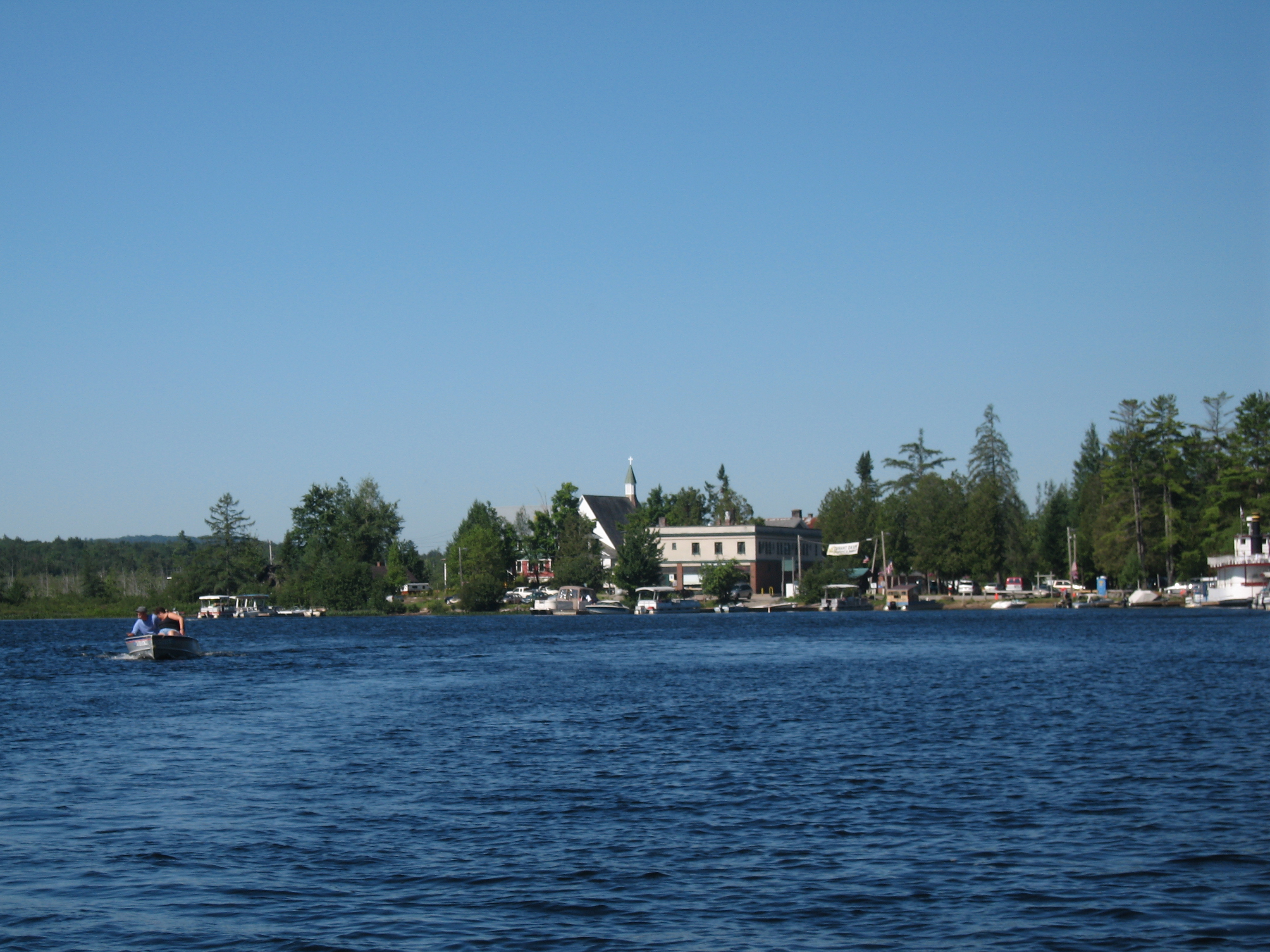
Public center of Raquette Lake village

Raquette Lake is a hamlet in the town of Long Lake in Hamilton County, New York, United States.

The community is on New York State Route 28 on the western side of Raquette Lake. Great Camp Sagamore is in the hamlet.
