= Great Camps =

Cabins in the Adirondack Mountains of New York, USA

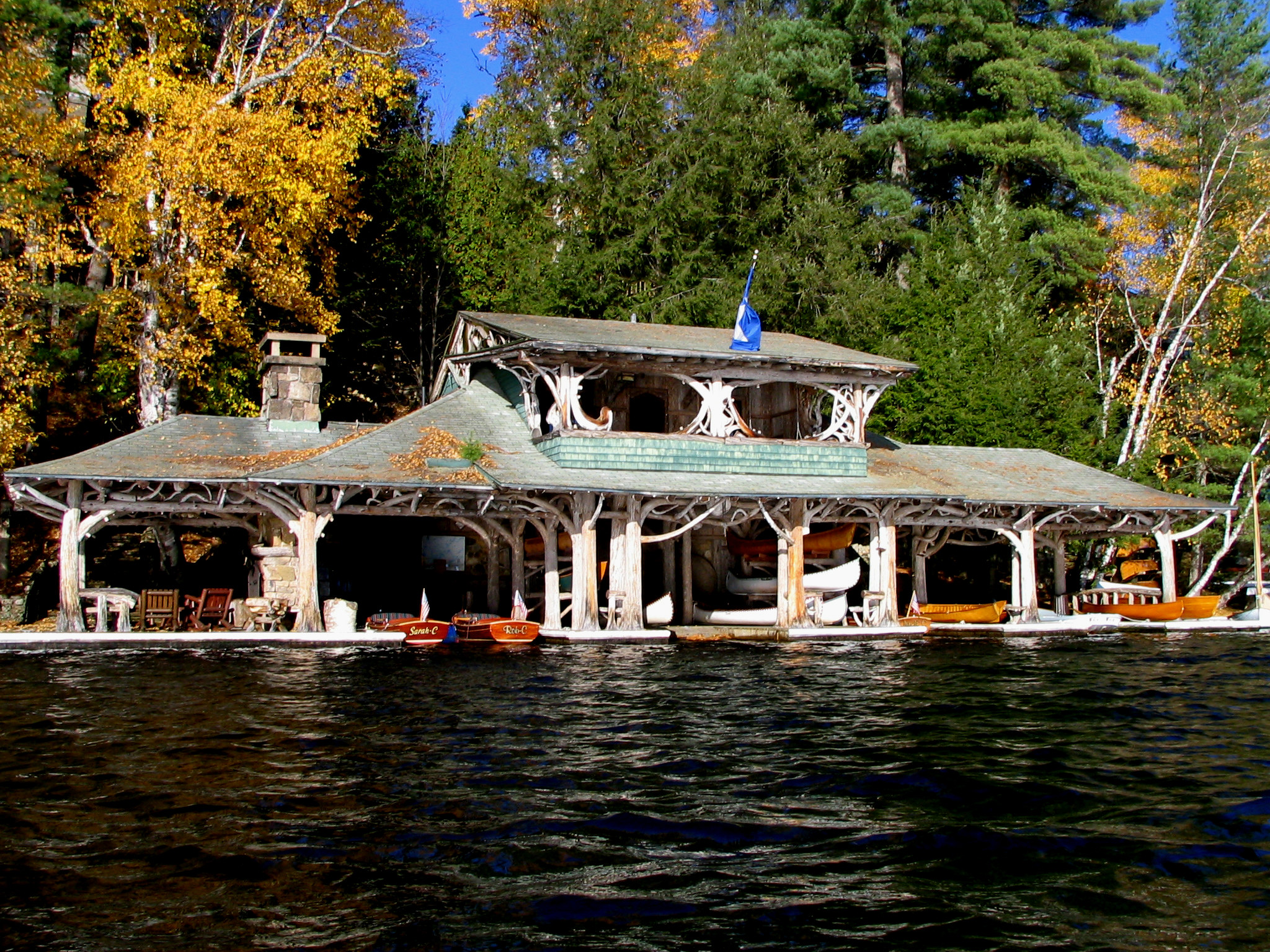
The twig work boathouse at Camp Topridge

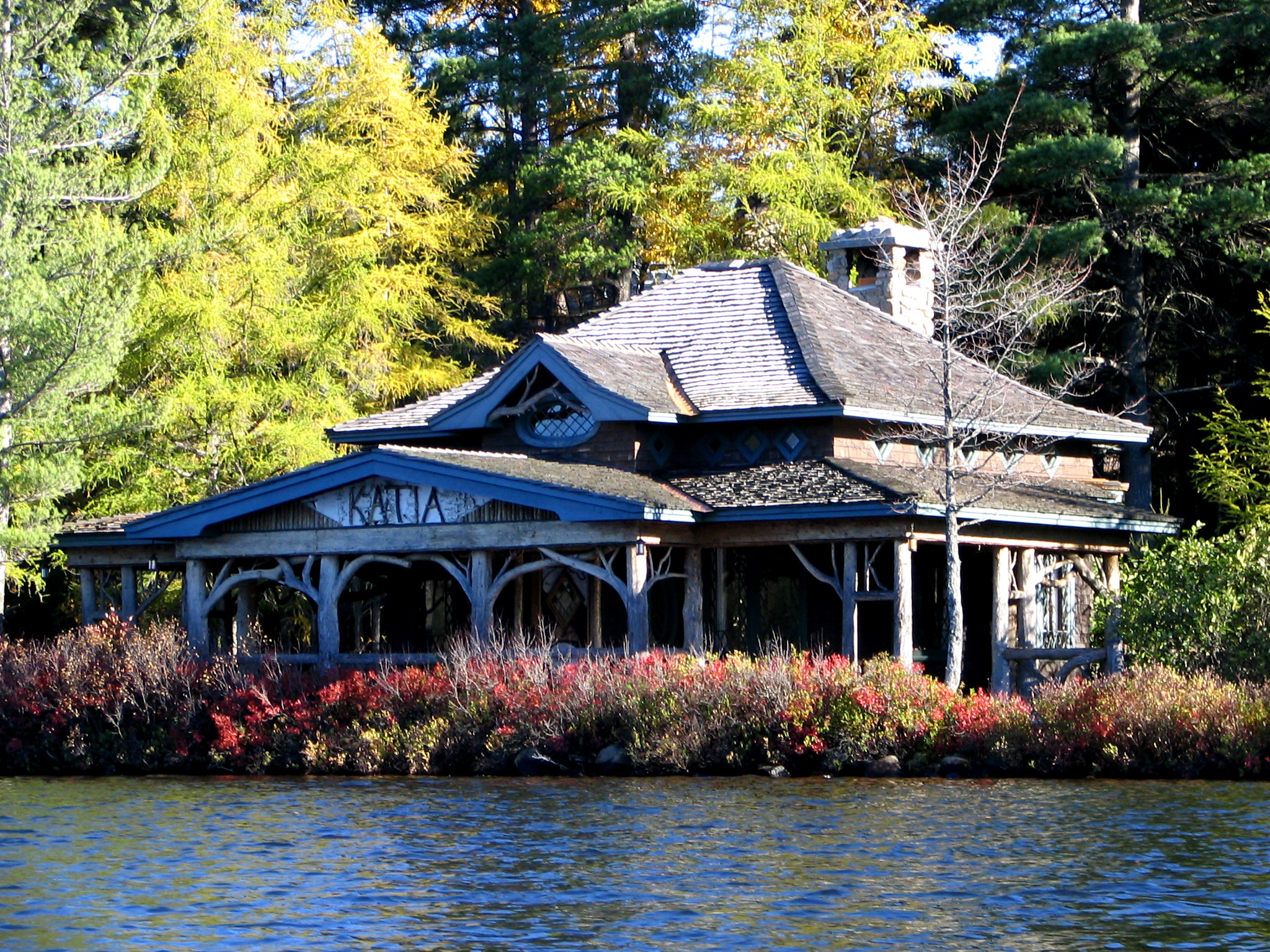
Camp Katia on Upper St. Regis Lake

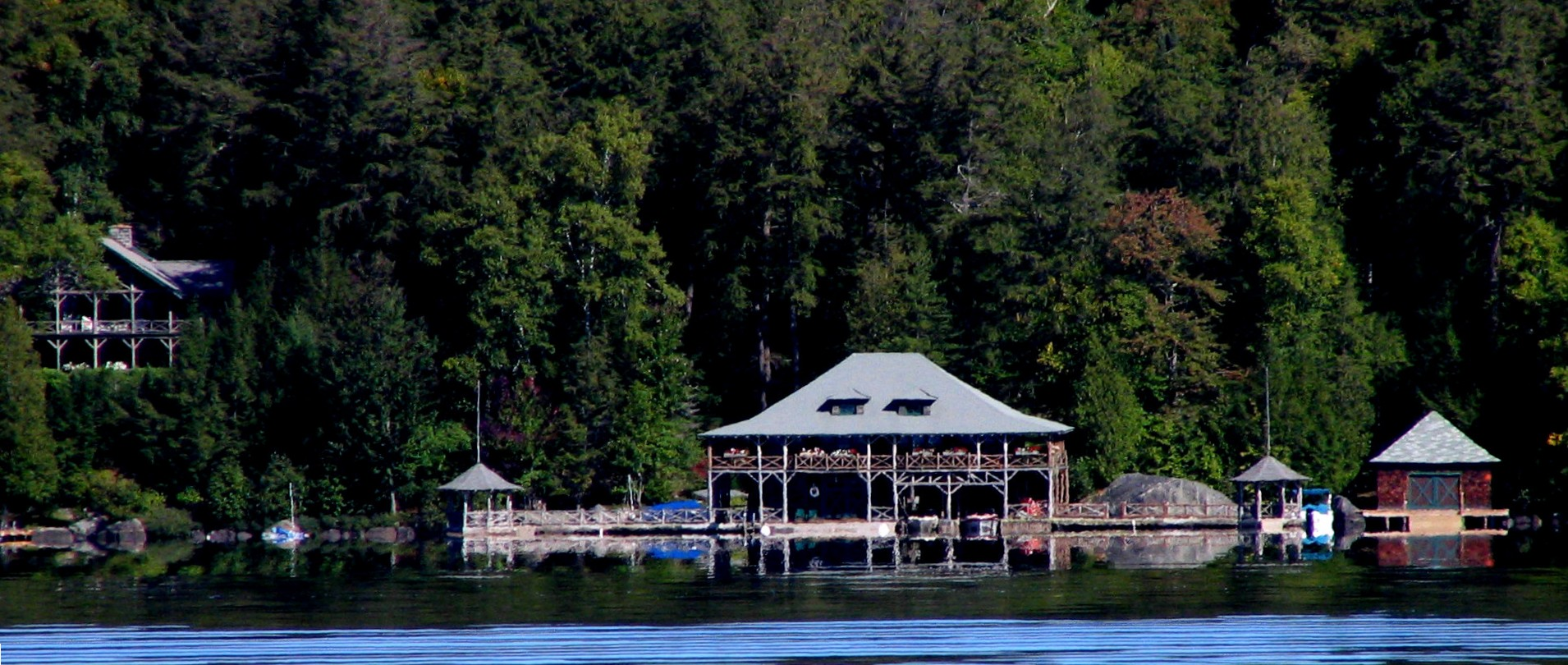
The boathouse and one of the cottages at Knollwood Club on Lower Saranac Lake

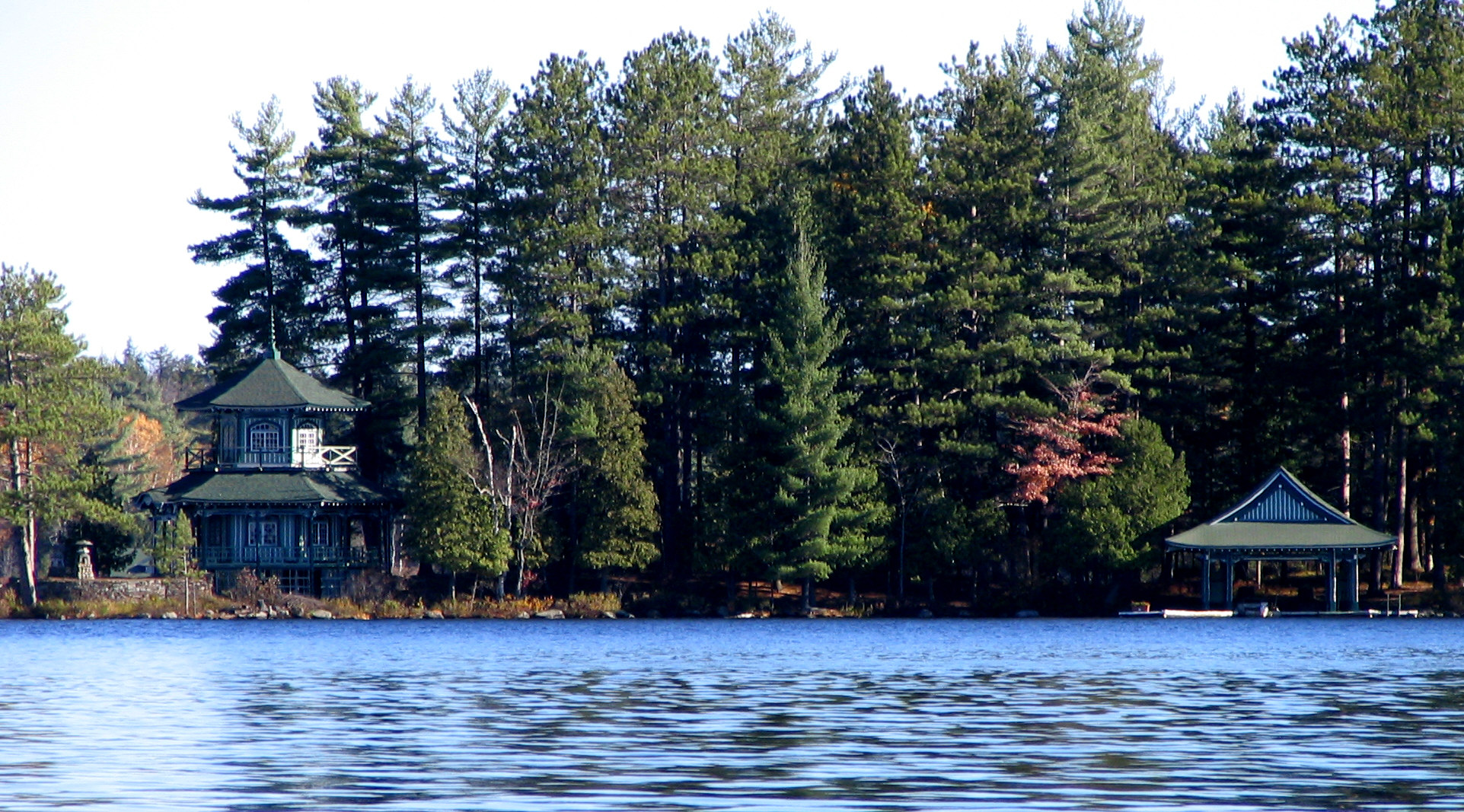
Pine Tree Point on Upper St. Regis Lake

The Great Camps are grandiose family compounds of cabins that were built in the latter half of the 19th century on remote lakes in the Adirondack Mountains of northern New York. Summer homes for the wealthy, they combined rough and rural foundational elements with often lavish and sophisticated details, drawing on the Arts and Crafts Movement and American Craftsman styles of the time. Indigenous logs and stone were combined with distinctive often elaborate "twigwork" to create a "Great Camp" style, initially popularized by William West Durant.

== History ==
The Adirondack Mountain region was one of the last areas of the northeastern United States to be explored by settlers; the headwaters of the Hudson River near Lake Tear of the Clouds on the slopes of Mount Marcy were not discovered until more than 50 years after the headwaters of the Columbia River in the Canadian Rockies. Although a few sportsmen had shown some interest earlier, the publication of William H. H. Murray's Adventures in the Wilderness; Or Camp-Life in the Adirondacks in 1869 started a flood of tourists to the area, leading to a rash of hotel building and the development of stagecoach lines. Thomas C. Durant, who had helped to build the Union Pacific Railroad, acquired a large tract of central Adirondack land and built the Adirondack Railway from fashionable Saratoga Springs to North Creek some 50 miles northwest. By 1875 there were more than 200 hotels in the Adirondacks, some with several hundred rooms; the most famous was Paul Smith's Hotel, which humbly began without indoor plumbing.

The early began as simple tent camps, often on land initially leased from hotel owners, as hotel guests sought a more authentic wilderness experience. The tent camps evolved into tent platforms or lean-tos and then into compounds of rustic cabins. Even in the early stages, some of these camps became quite elaborate. In 1883 one of the first families on Upper St. Regis Lake, that of the wealthy merchant Anson Phelps Stokes, would arrive in a "special parlour horse car direct from 42nd street to Ausable for $100." One party consisted of 10 family members and an equal number of servants, "three horses, two dogs, one carriage, five large boxes of tents, three cases of wine, two packages of stovepipe, two stoves, one bale of china, one iron pot, four washstands, one barrel of hardware, four bundles of poles, seventeen cots and seventeen mattresses, four canvas packages, one buckboard, [...], twenty-five trunks, thirteen small boxes, one boat, one hamper", all of which was then transferred to wagons for the 36 mile ride to Paul Smiths, and thence by boat to their island campsite.

As the region's hotels became more refined and elaborate, so too did the camps. But the use of rustic, native materials and craftsmen remained, as did a tendency to use separate buildings for separate functions, from dining to sleeping cabins, bowling alleys to dance pavilions, some connected by covered walkways as features of a distinctive Adirondack Architecture.

The largest and most luxurious camps were generally built on large landholdings; Adirondack land was cheap, and the buyers were extraordinarily wealthy. Many of them were Jewish families excluded from the traditional Adirondack resorts. For example, the rules of the Lake Placid Club specifically excluded anyone "against whom there is any reasonable physical, moral, social or race objection ... This invariable rule is rigidly enforced: it is found impracticable to make exceptions to Jews or others excluded...." Excluded wealthy Jews such as Otto Kahn, Alfred Lewisohn, Daniel Guggenheim, and Evelyn Lehman Ehrich and Harriet Lehman (daughters of one of the founders of brokerage firm Lehman Brothers) purchased land and constructed Great Camps.

Elaborate private lodges and cabins owned by groups of wealthy Easterners were subsequently constructed in the Western United States, especially in the Rocky Mountains. Often families departed from New York or Chicago and traveled by train to spend long periods in summer in the high country. Some lodges in the West were built by railroad interests, which were able to pick the best land while surveying potential rail routes.

== Preservation ==
The term "great camp" was used as early as 1916, although it was not until the late 20th century, when preservation of these historic properties became a widely shared concern, that the term gained popular currency. By 1921, in A History of the Adirondacks, Alfred Lee Donaldson was writing that "Among Adirondack terms calling for exact definition is the word 'camp.'... If you chance to know a millionaire, you may be housed in a cobblestone castle, tread on Persian rugs, bathe in a marble tub, and retire by electric light—and still your host may call his mountain home a 'camp.'"

The realization that the camps were vulnerable to development, neglect, or outright demolition came when, in 1975, Syracuse University announced plans to sell Sagamore Camp, which had been a gift to the university from Margaret Emerson. As Craig Gilborn, director of the Adirondack Museum put it, "If a college or university, regarded as the best societal steward of cultural properties, could now treat them as part of an investment portfolio, then the camps were in real jeopardy." Particularly worrisome was that under the Forever Wild provision of the New York Constitution, if the camp were acquired by the state as part of the Forest Preserve, the buildings would have to be destroyed.

Sagamore was listed on the National Register of Historic Places in 1976. In the early 1980s staff of the Adirondack Museum recognized the Great Camps as a historic resource of the region and undertook basic documentation. The Preservation League of New York State became active in saving Camp Sagamore and worked to amend the Constitution of New York in order to save the service complex buildings there, adding them to the landmark complex. The Preservation League also conducted an extensive survey of the region, identifying more than 30 properties that might be considered "Great Camps of the Adirondacks."

At the same time, Harvey Kaiser, a vice-president of Syracuse University, interviewed owners and others familiar with these historic properties, photographing the buildings in their settings. He wrote and illustrated an important 1982 book, "Great Camps of the Adirondacks," which popularized the term, stimulating wider public concern for preservation of these landmark buildings.

Shortly after demolition of the historic buildings at Sagamore Camp was averted, nearby Camp Uncas was similarly threatened. The same couple who saved Sagamore Camp, Howard Kirschenbaum and Barbara Glaser, negotiated with the State of New York, acquiring these buildings to save them. Kirschenbaum then founded Adirondack Architectural Heritage, a regional preservation organization that undertook a long, eventually successful campaign to save the historic buildings of the Santanoni Preserve.

In July 1986, a multiple property submission for registration of 10 great camps on the National Register was completed. It was certified in September 1986 by the State Historic Preservation Officer. The 10 camps covered were:

- Camp Eagle Island
- Camp Pine Knot
- Camp Topridge
- Camp Uncas
- Camp Wild Air
- Echo Camp
- Moss Ledge
- Prospect Point Camp
- Sagamore Lodge (a boundary increase to the Sagamore Camp), and
- Santanoni Preserve

These were subsequently added to the National Register in 1986 and 1987. Flat Rock Camp was added in 2006 and Werrenrath Camp in 2010. Both Sagamore Camp and[Santanoni Preserve have since become National Historic Landmarks, in 2000, as have Camp Uncas, Camp Pine Knot at Raquette Lake and Girl Scout Camp Eagle Island on Upper Saranac Lake, in 2004. Since the early preservation crises, appreciation of the Great Camps of the Adirondacks has increased, so that fewer seemed to be in jeopardy as of 2006.

== See also ==
- Adirondack Architecture
- Joe Bryere
- Carnegie Camp North Point
- Knollwood Club
- Pine Tree Point
- White Pine Camp
