= Church of the Holy Communion =

Church of the Holy Communion may refer to

- Church of the Holy Communion (St. Peter, Minnesota), listed on the National Register of Historic Places in Nicollet County, Minnesota
- Church of the Holy Communion (Norwood, New Jersey), listed on the National Register of Historic Places in Bergen County, New Jersey
- Church of the Holy Communion (Dallas), a Reformed Episcopal Church cathedral in Texas
- Church of the Holy Communion and Buildings, a deconsecrated church in Manhattan, New York City
