= Church of the Good Shepherd (Raquette Lake, New York) =

New York Episcopal church

Coordinates: 43°49′45″N 74°38′28″W

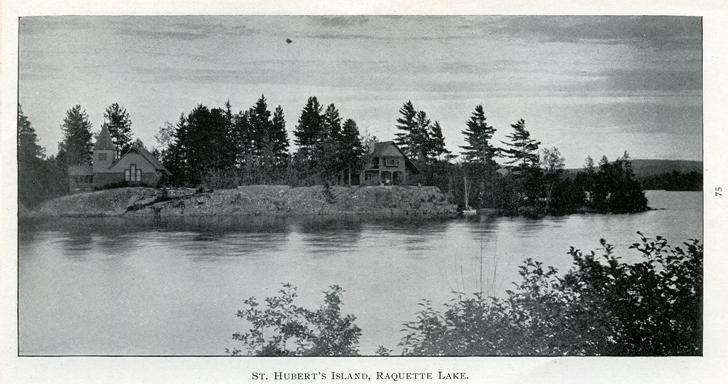
Church and Rectory, 1900.

The Church of the Good Shepherd is an Episcopal church on Saint Hubert's Isle in Raquette Lake, in the town of Long Lake, New York. Erected by developer William West Durant in 1880, it was built to serve the owners, guests and employees of the Great Camps that Durant was creating in the area. Designed by the architectural firm of J. Cleaveland Cady of New York City, Good Shepherd is an example of the stick style of architecture, popular during the latter part of the 19th century. The island was originally named Bluff Island, but was later renamed in honor of Saint Hubert, the patron saint of hunters.

The island church was a subject for many well-known photographers during the late 19th century - Seneca Ray Stoddard, William Henry Jackson and Edward Bierstadt. John Whetten Ehninger's 1881 painting of it is now at the Adirondack Museum. Good Shepherd was also mentioned in writings by the authors and poets Nessmuk, Seneca Ray Stoddard, the Rev. E.O. Flagg and Alfred L. Donaldson, among others.

The first treasurer of the summer chapel was John Boyd Thacher, a future mayor of Albany (1886–88, 1896–97). The warden was William West Durant.

The church is open to the public annually on the first Sunday of August at 3:00 pm, with free transportation from the Raquette Lake Village dock beginning at 2:00 pm. Visitors are also invited to come by canoe, guide boat and rowboat as they did more than a century ago.

St. William's Roman Catholic Church (1890), a nearby shingle style church on Long Point, was also designed by Cady and built by Durant.
