= J. Cleaveland Cady =

American architect (1837–1919)

J. Cleaveland Cady L.L.D., F.A.I.A.
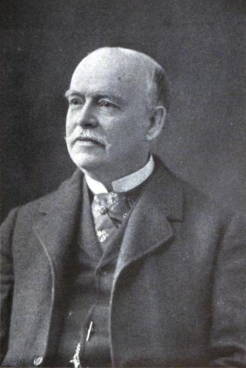
- Born: Josiah Cleaveland Cady; 1837; Providence, Rhode Island, U.S.
- Died: April 17, 1919 (aged 82); New York City, New York, U.S.
- Education: Trinity College
- Occupation: Architect
- Practice: J. C. Cady & Company; Cady, Berg & See; Cady & Gregory
- Buildings: American Museum of Natural History Boone Tavern; Metropolitan Opera House; Othniel C. Marsh House; Peabody Museum at Yale Saint Anthony Hall

Josiah Cleaveland Cady (January 1837 – April 17, 1919) was an American architect known for his Romanesque Revival designs. He was also a founder of the American Institute of Architects.

Cady started his career as a draftsman for Town & Davis in New York City. He opened his Manhattan practice, J. Cleaveland Cady, Architect, in 1864. The firm became J. C. Cady & Company in 1882 and Cady, Berg & See in 1890. Cady's work was diverse, including residences, churches, colleges, libraries, museums, and railroad depots. His first major project was designing the Brooklyn Art Association's Brooklyn Academy of Design in 1869, with architect Henry Martyn Congdon.

Cady designed the American Museum of Natural History, the Metropolitan Opera House, and fifteen buildings at Yale University. Although much of his work centered around New York and New England, he was also the main architectural advisor for Berea College in Kentucky. Cady's designs include one National Historic Landmark and twelve buildings that are individually listed in the National Register of Historic Places.

== Early life ==
Cady was born in Providence, Rhode Island in January 1837, to Lydia Smith Platner and Josiah Cady, a deacon who was president of the Rhode Island State Anti-Slavery Society. Josiah Cady died in 1853.

Cady attended Bacon Academy and Plainfield Academy, both in Connecticut. He attended Trinity College in Hartford, Connecticut for one year in 1857, and took additional classes in 1860. At Trinity, he was a member of the Fraternity of Delta Psi (St. Anthony Hall). However, he did not officially graduate.

Between 1857 and 1864, Cady pursued his studies in architecture in New York with an unknown German professor of architecture. He also studied watercolor painting with Alfred Fredericks.

== Career ==
Cady worked as a draftsman for Town & Davis in New York City. In 1857, he helped found the American Institute of Architects (AIA), although he did not join at the time. He became a member when he started working professionally in 1864. He was made an AIA Fellow in 1865. Cady gave a presentation on old Dutch farmhouses of colonial New Jersey to the AIA New York City chapter. He also published a paper on opera houses in the AIA journal.

By 1864, he opened his practice, J. Cleaveland Cady, Architect. He advertised that he could provide designs and plans for churches, cottages, public buildings, residences, schools, stores, and warehouses. The Brooklyn Union described Cady as "a young man of fine talents, of refined and cultivated taste, and profoundly zealous in his profession".

From 1864 to 1881, his offices were in the Trinity Building at 111 Broadway in Manhattan, which served as a studio for dozens of architects, providing opportunities for many collaborations. In 1864, he worked with associates Rider & Alden in Hartford, Connecticut. In May 1869, he was associated with architect Henry M. Cougdon.

In 1871, Milton See (1854–1920) joined his practice, followed by Louis DeCoppet Berg (1856–1945) in 1873. Both were just seventeen years old when they began working with Cady. In 1872, Bradford L. Gilbert began training under Cady; he later formed a successful national practice.

In 1880, Cady designed an elegant Old English double house at 1826 Massachusetts Avenue in the Northwest neighborhood of the District of Columbia for sisters Mrs. Katherine Miller and Mrs. Charlotte E. Hopkins. The Hopkins-Miller House was named after their husbands, Colonel Hopkins and Lieutenant Miller. The double house had the appearance of a single large mansion from the outside. It faced Pacific Circle (later Dupont Circle).

In 1882, Cady formed the firm J. C. Cady & Company. In 1890, the firm became known as Cady, Berg & See. With formal training in Germany, Prussia, and Switzerland, Berg was probably the firm's structural and mechanical engineer. See was the chief technician, while Cady was the chief designer. Their offices were located at 31 East 17th Street in New York City. They were joined by student draftsman William S. Gregory (1865–1945) in 1892. The firm dissolved in 1909.

Cady and Gregory formed a partnership known as Cady & Gregory in 1909. They had offices at 6 West 23rd Street in New York City in 1913 and at 40 West 32nd Street in 1919. When Cady died, he left his share of the business to Gregory.

In 1920, Alexander Dana Noyes wrote, "In his professional career, J. Cleveland Cady was perhaps the embodiment of the effort of American architecture, fifty years ago, to find itself while cutting loose from the false and meretricious standards of the Second Empire."

=== Honors ===
Trinity College presented Cady with an honorary M.A. in 1880, followed by an honorary LL.D. in 1905. Cady's architectural library of more than 400 volumes is housed in Watkinson Library at Trinity College. This is "one of the few intact architectural libraries of nineteenth-century America, allowing a rare glimpse into the working method of one of the era's major architectural firms.' In 1993, Trinity College hosted the exhibition "Forgotten Architect of the Gilded Age: Josiah Cleaveland Cady's Legacy" with a catalog by Kathleen A. Curran

== Projects ==
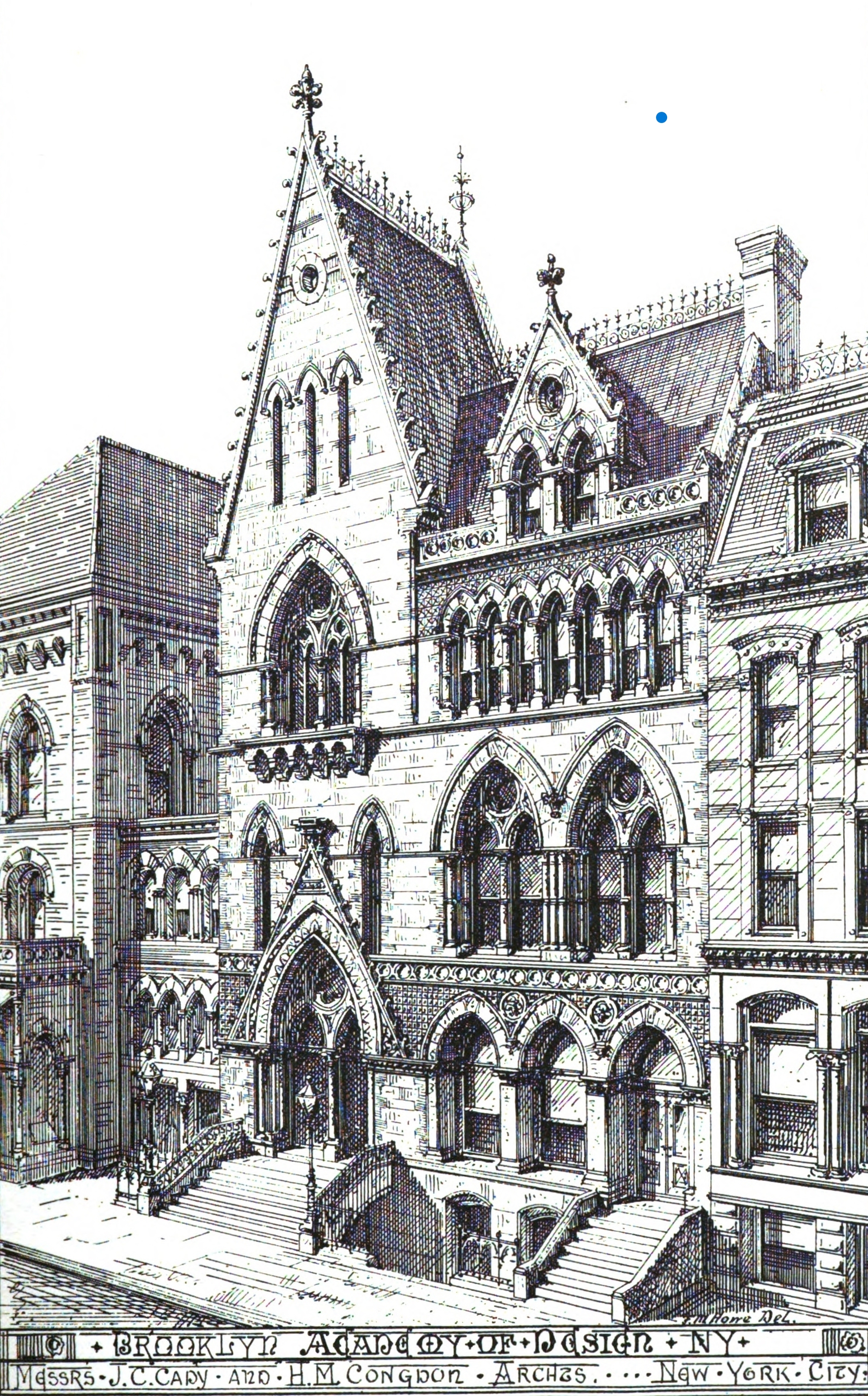
Brooklyn Academy of Design

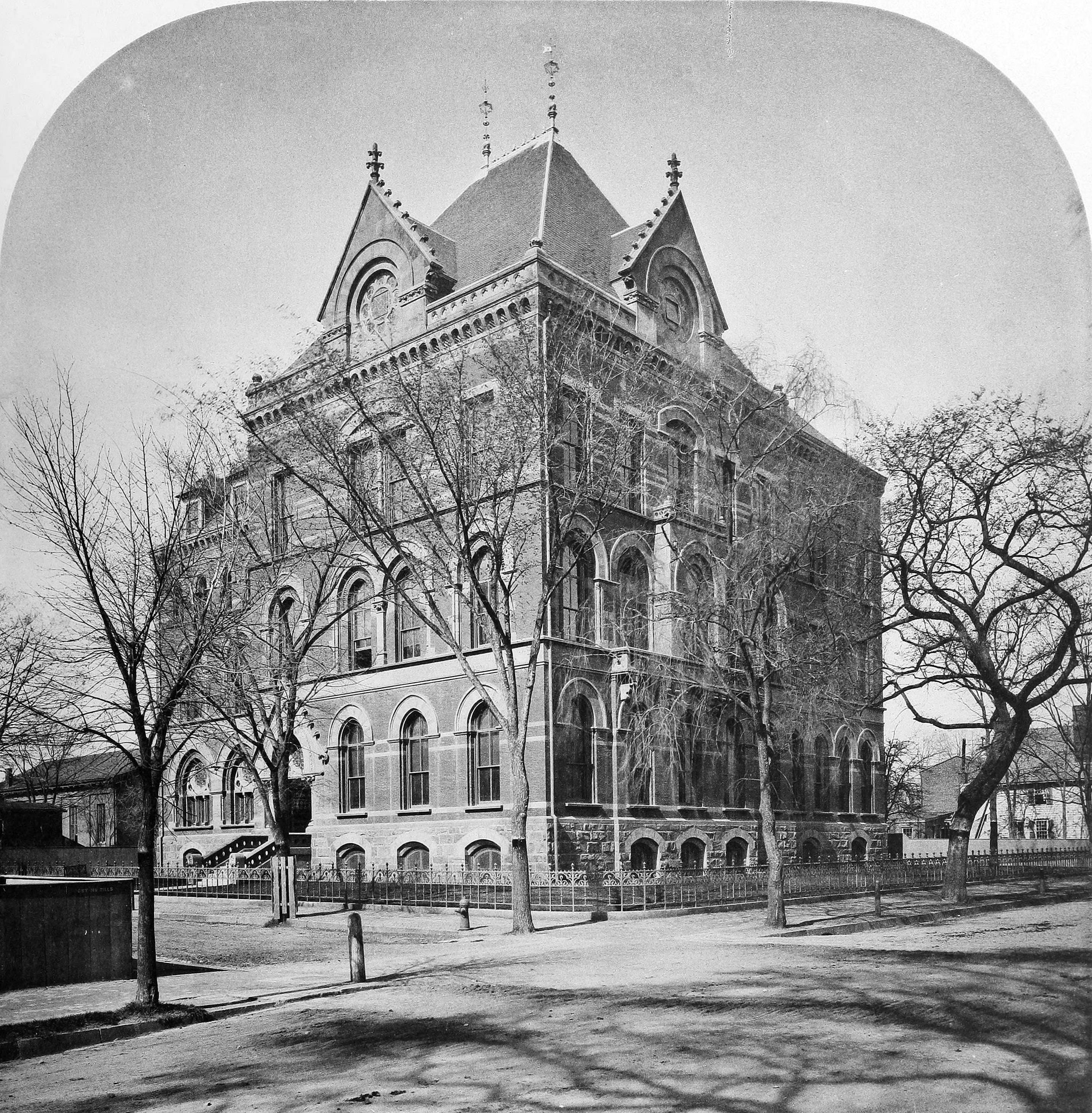
Peabody Museum, circa 1879

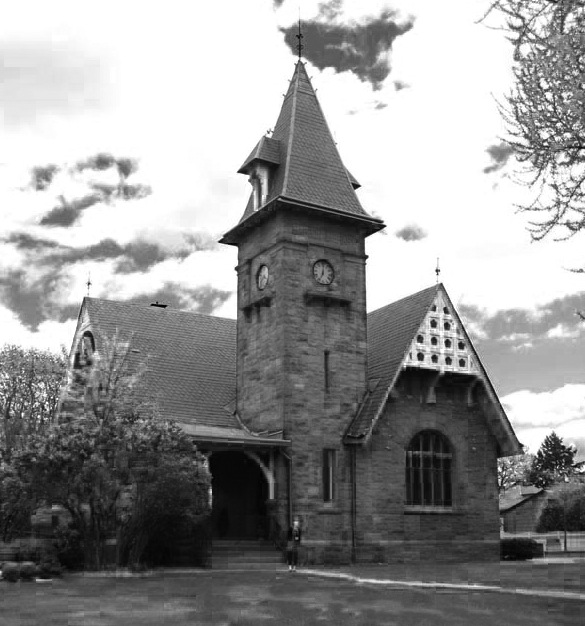
Barron Library, now the Barron Arts Center

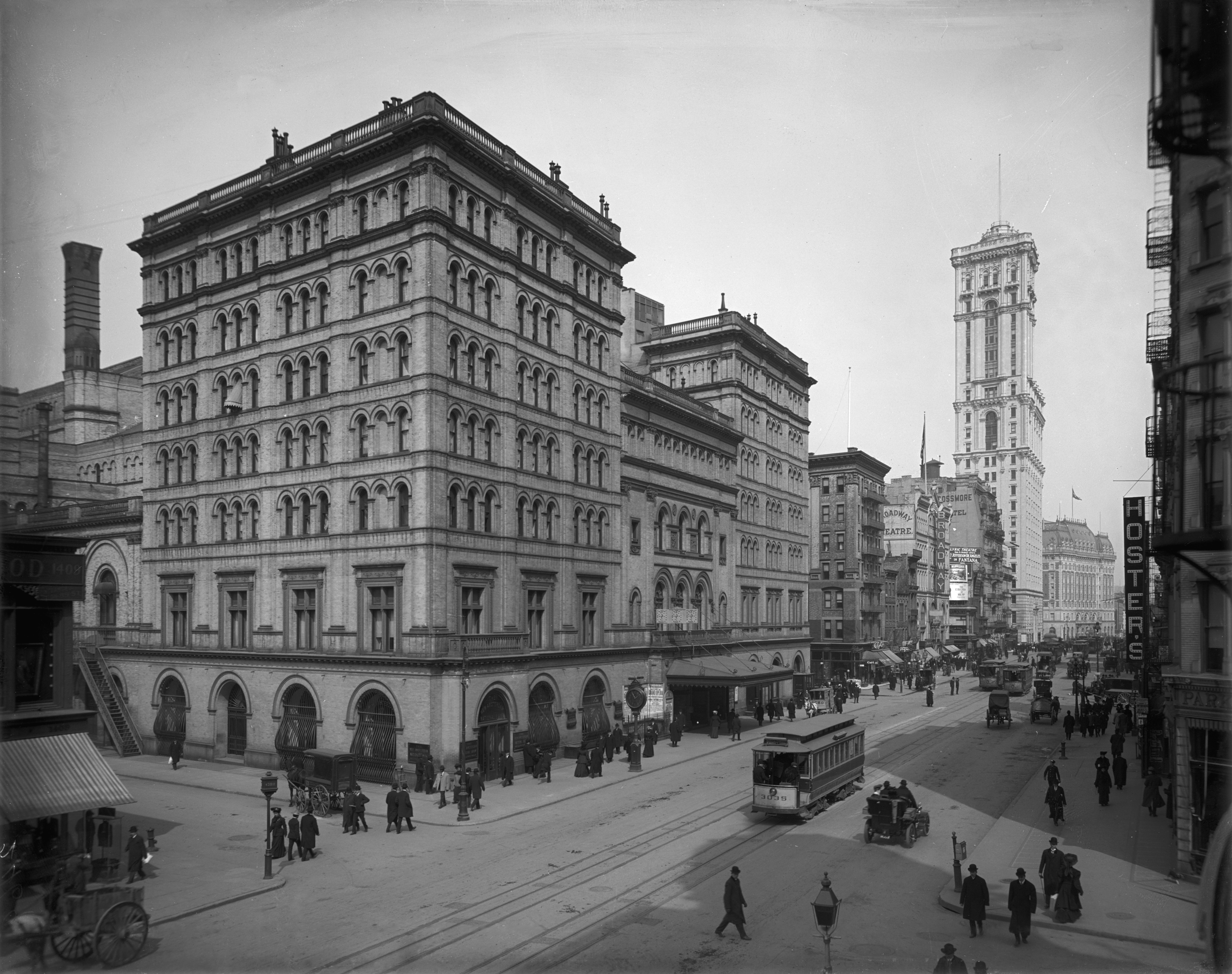
Metropolitan Opera House in 1905

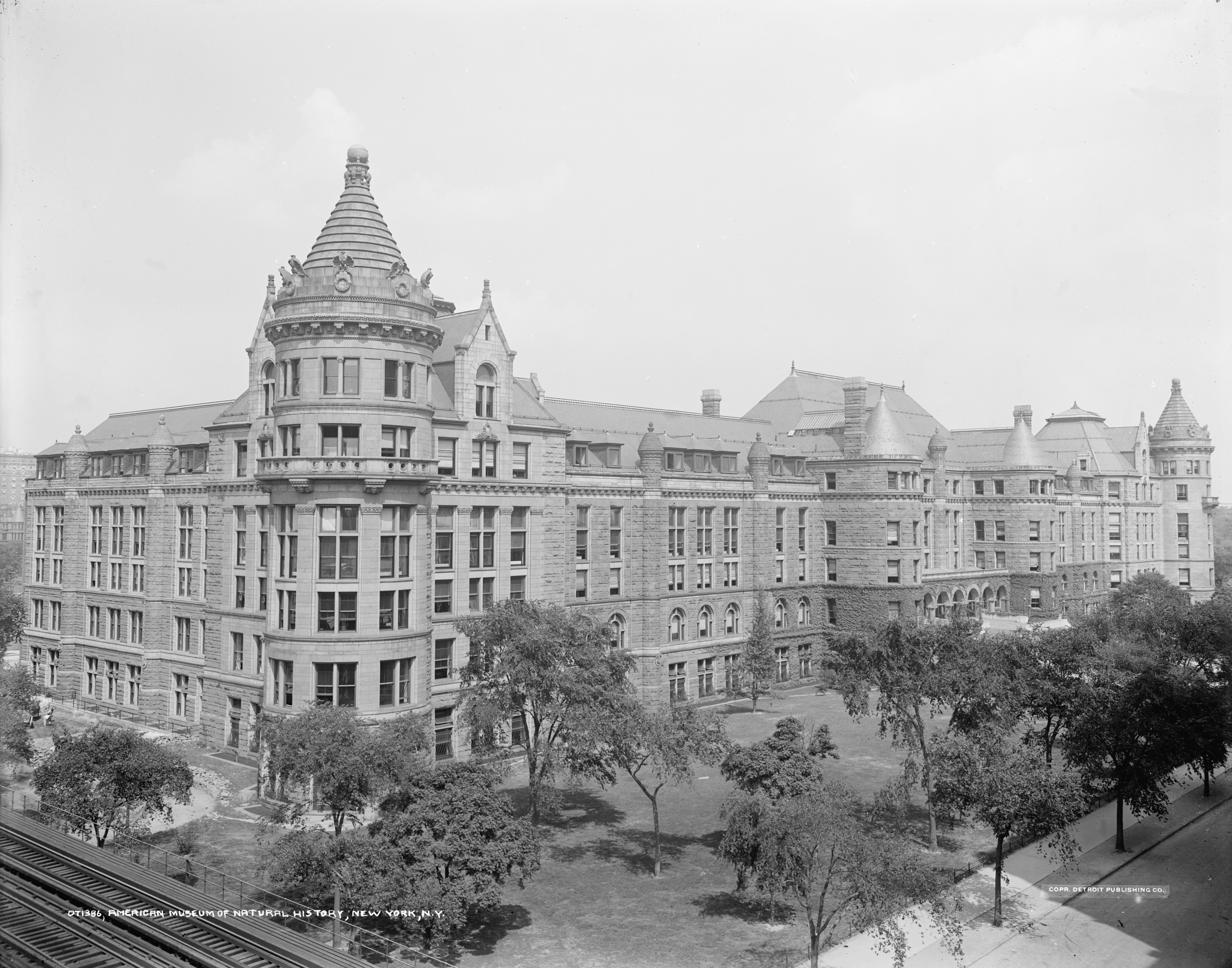
American Museum of Natural History, circa 1900

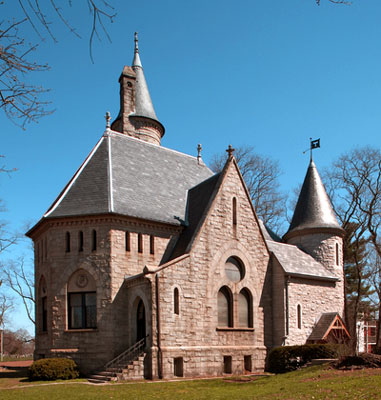
Saint Anthony Hall at Trinity College

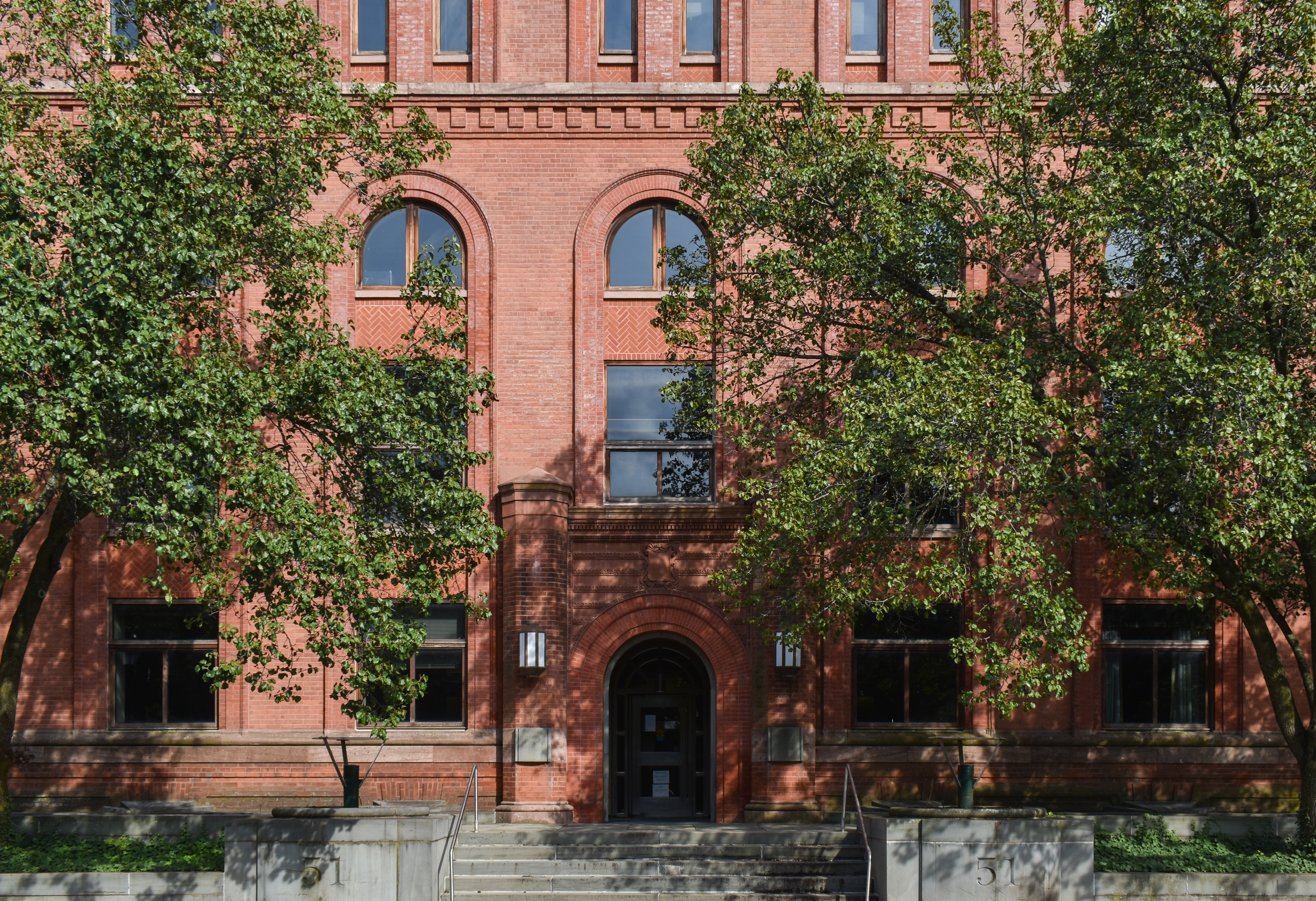
Sheffield Chemical Laboratory, Yale University

=== Cultural buildings ===
==== Brooklyn Academy of Design ====
Cady's first important commission was to build the Brooklyn Art Association's Brooklyn Academy of Design in 1889. For this project, he worked with architect Henry M. Cougdon, but there is no evidence that they worked together on other projects. They executed the stone building in high Victorian Gothic style in tones of brown, grey, and pink. Opening in 1872, the Brooklyn Academy of Design included exhibition space and studios for artists.

The building was pictured in The American Architect and Building News in January 1876. Architectural critic Montgomery Schuyler said that Cady's Brooklyn Academy of Design was one of the few successful examples of secular Gothic design.

==== Peabody Museum ====
Cady designed the original Peabody Museum of Natural History to house Yale University's mineral collection, fossils, and exhibits on zoology and geology. The Gothic style building was constructed between 1873 and 1876 from brown and Nova Scotia stone, as well as Philadelphia-pressed brick. However, only a portion of Cady's design was ever constructed. The museum was located at the corner of Elm and High Streets but was demolished in 1917.

==== Barron Library ====
Cady designed the Barron Library in Middlesex, New Jersey in 1877. This brownstone in Richardson Romanesque style has a Roman arch, a three-story tower, and stained-glass windows. This was likely the first time Cady used Richardsonian Romanesque style and is a restrained attempt because he wanted to blend the library into its rural background.

==== Metropolitan Opera House ====
Cady was the architect of the original Metropolitan Opera House, which opened in October 1883. To get this contract, the firm won a design contest, gaining the advantage because of its functional design, fireproof materials, and low construction costs. It also incorporated the newest engineering technologies, including electric lights, elevators, an iron cage for structural support, a sprinkler system for fire suppression, and a simple air conditioning system. Architect Joseph J. Korom notes that on this project, Cady was "a true architectural pioneer".

When completed, it seated 3,700 people and was the largest opera house in the world. Its four-story façade had matching seven-story towers with commercial establishments on the ground level, restaurants and ballrooms above, and apartments for bachelors in the upper levels—Korom calls this "an early and excellent example of a multi-use project". Its plans were published in The American Architect, February 16, 1884.

Cady said the Metropolitan Opera House had "a simple dignity that will not be tiresome or uninteresting as the years go by". Although its yellow brick and terracotta exterior was not particularly noteworthy, the Historic American Buildings Survey noted, "its interior placed it among the great opera houses of the world". Cady's original auditorium was destroyed by a fire on August 27, 1892; it was rebuilt by the architectural firm of Carrère and Hastings and was used until 1966. However, in 1939, the New York City Guide by the Federal Writers' Project noted, "The opera house was designed by J. C. Cady, a prominent architect of the day. That Mr. Cady was without experience in theater construction seemed to matter little; audiences ever since have paid for his mistakes, as but half the stage can be seen from the side seats of the balcony and family circle." The opera house was razed in January 1967.

==== American Museum of Natural History ====
Cady, Berg & See designed the main building of the American Museum of Natural History (1899) in New York City. The firm was selected through an invitation-only contest held in 1887. The museum's Romanesque Revival design was very open because of iron supports beneath the red granite façade. Running 710 feet (220 m) along the museum's West 77th Street entrance, this was the longest public building façade in New York City. It included black cherry window frames, elaborate cornices, cartouches, eagles, finials, wreaths, and a 112 feet (34 m) wideporte-cochère. Joan Kelly Benard says, "the 77th Street façade has been hailed as one of the finest examples of Romanesque Revival architecture in New York City." Inside, the building reflected a new approach to museum design; it included spaces for public exhibitions and scholarly study.

=== Colleges ===
Cady, Berg & See designed buildings for many college including Bellevue Medical School, Berea College, Trinity College, Wesleyan University, Williams College, and Yale University.

==== Trinity College ====
At Trinity College, Cady designed Saint Anthony Hall (1878), a chapter house for the Fraternity of Delta Psi (St. Anthony Hall). Robert Habersham Coleman, a former classmate and fraternity brother of Cady, donated the funds to construct the chapter house. Architectural historian Kathleen A. Curran notes that Cady's Romanesque Revival fraternity house design departed "from the traditional 'tomb-like' structures of fraternities at other schools [and]...was more a cross between a house and fortress." The building was listed on the National Register of Historic Places in November 1985.

He also designed the Jarvis Hall of Science (1899) at Trinity, a simple Romanesque-style building with laboratories and classrooms that was demolished in the 1960s.

==== Yale University ====
Cady designed more than fifteen buildings for Yale University, including the now demolished Dwight Hall (1885–1886), Berkeley Hall (1893–1894), White Hall (1893–1894), Pierson Hall (1896), Fayerweather Hall (1900–1901), Lampson Hall (1903), and Lyceum Hall (1903).

He designed three buildings for Yale's newly organized Scheffield Scientific School—North Sheffield School (1873, demolished 1968), Winchester Hall (1892–1893, demolished 1968), and Sheffield Chemical Laboratory, now called Watson Hall (1894–1895).Cady's brick and masonry Romanesque Revival design for North Sheffield became the template for Winchester and Watson Halls.The scientific school's faculty approved of Cady's Reductionism design.George Brush, head of Sheffield's engineering department, praised North Sheffield Hall, saying:

The building is considered a complete success; great surprise is expressed that with so simple an external form—a mere cube—such an admirable architectural effect has been produced, and the interior arrangements are so simple, complete and substantial, that everyone is impressed with the fact, that nothing has been sacrificed to mere decoration, but everything is for use...it is thoroughly well adapted for the uses of our institution.

Cady's design for the Yale Infirmary (1892) departed from his simple institutional buildings and instead looked like a Neocolonial or Georgian revival style mansion to create a refuge for sick students. He designed the Renaissance Revival style Hendrie Hall (1894–1900) for Yale's Law School; it now houses the Adams Center for Musical Arts. He also designed Chittenden Hall (1890) also known as Memorial Library. Although only part of Cady's design for Chittenden was constructed, Kathleen Curran says it is Cady's "most overtly Richardsonian [Romaneque] building."However, Curran says Sheffield Chemical Laboratory is "the best remaining example of the craftsmanship of Cady's buildings".

==== Williams College ====
In 1883, Cady designed the Morgan Hall dormitory for Williams College. This was followed by a Lasell Gymnasium in 1886. Both buildings are a mix of Romanesque Revival and Dutch Colonial Revival styles and were executed in Kentucky and Williamstown limestone.

==== Wesleyan University ====
Cady's work at Wesleyan University started with a boiler plant in 1891. His next commission was Fayerweather Gymnasium in 1889. Cady's Romanesque interpretation of a gym started a trend of Romanesque Revival style buildings on the Wesleyan campus. However, Berg's expertise in engineering was also essential in the wide spans of the gymnasium. The firm also designed additions to Memorial Chapel in 1898. In 1904, construction started on Wilbur Fisk Hall, another of their designs.

==== Bellevue Medical School ====
Cady designed the Bellevue Medical School (1897), later known as the New York University Medical School. The Beaux-Arts style building is located at the southwest corner of 26th Street in New York City. Its first floor has arched windows outlined with wedge-shaped bricks.

==== Berea College ====
Cady was the main architectural advisor for the Berea College Square. He was also the uncle of William Goodell Frost, president of Berea College. Cady, along with landscape architect John Charles Olmsted, convinced Frost to select Colonial Revival style for the campus' architectural theme, rather than the obvious choice of rustic style for Appalachia. In 1906, Cady wrote to Frost:

Such buildings would be proper for the forest reserves, farms, and farm laborers and even some men's dormitories, but not on the main campus. ... If the College's buildings seem merely to repeat the student's old mountain environments, they will not be in line with the work their studies are doing for them. As they acquire education and knowledge of the world, though they live in the mountains, they will hardly be content to live in the same cabins, and their regard and veneration for the College that helped them, will not likely be increased by the recollection of it as mainly a cluster of cabins. ... A College of log cabins would be a nightmare!

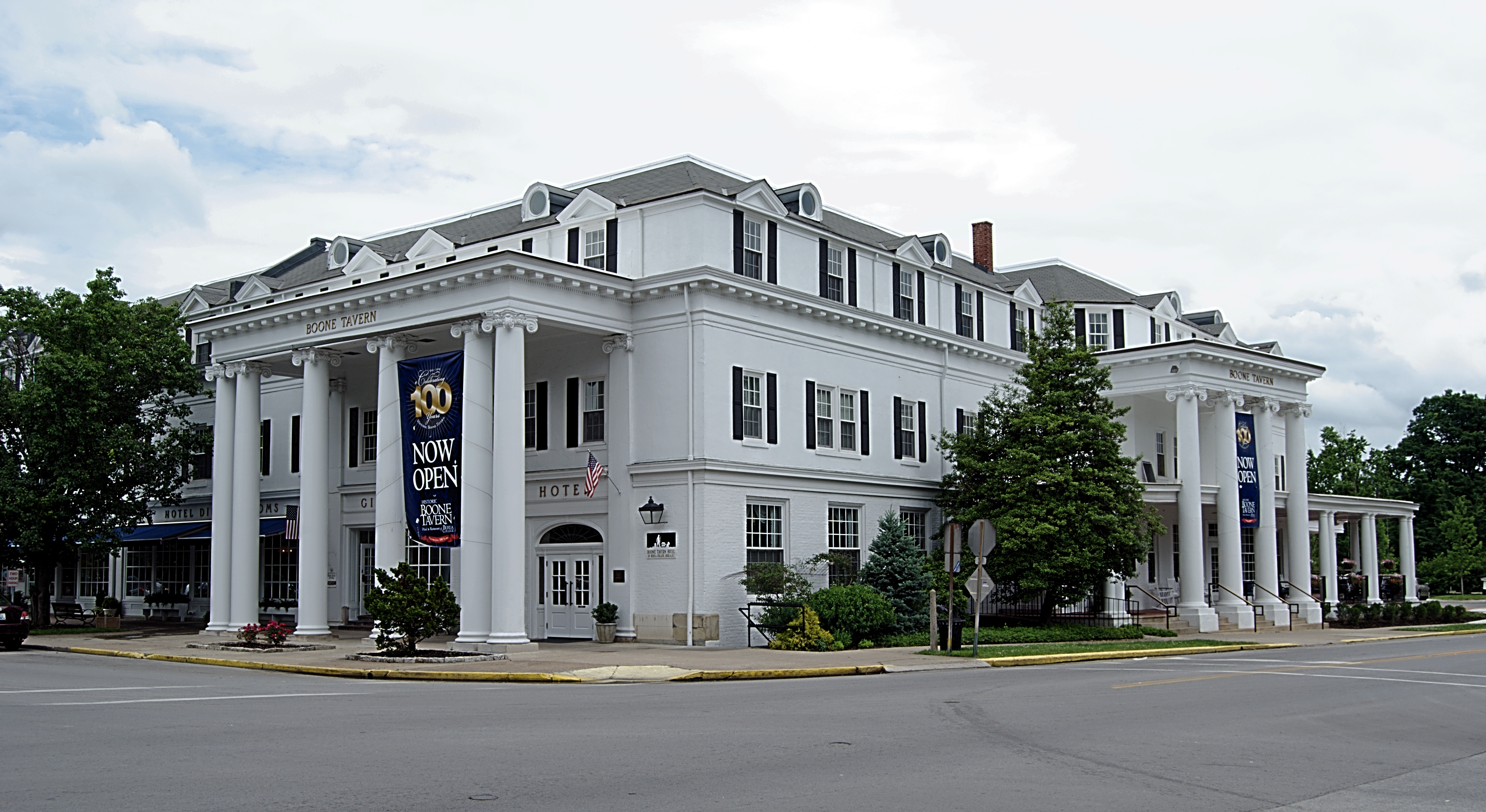
Boone Tavern, Berea College

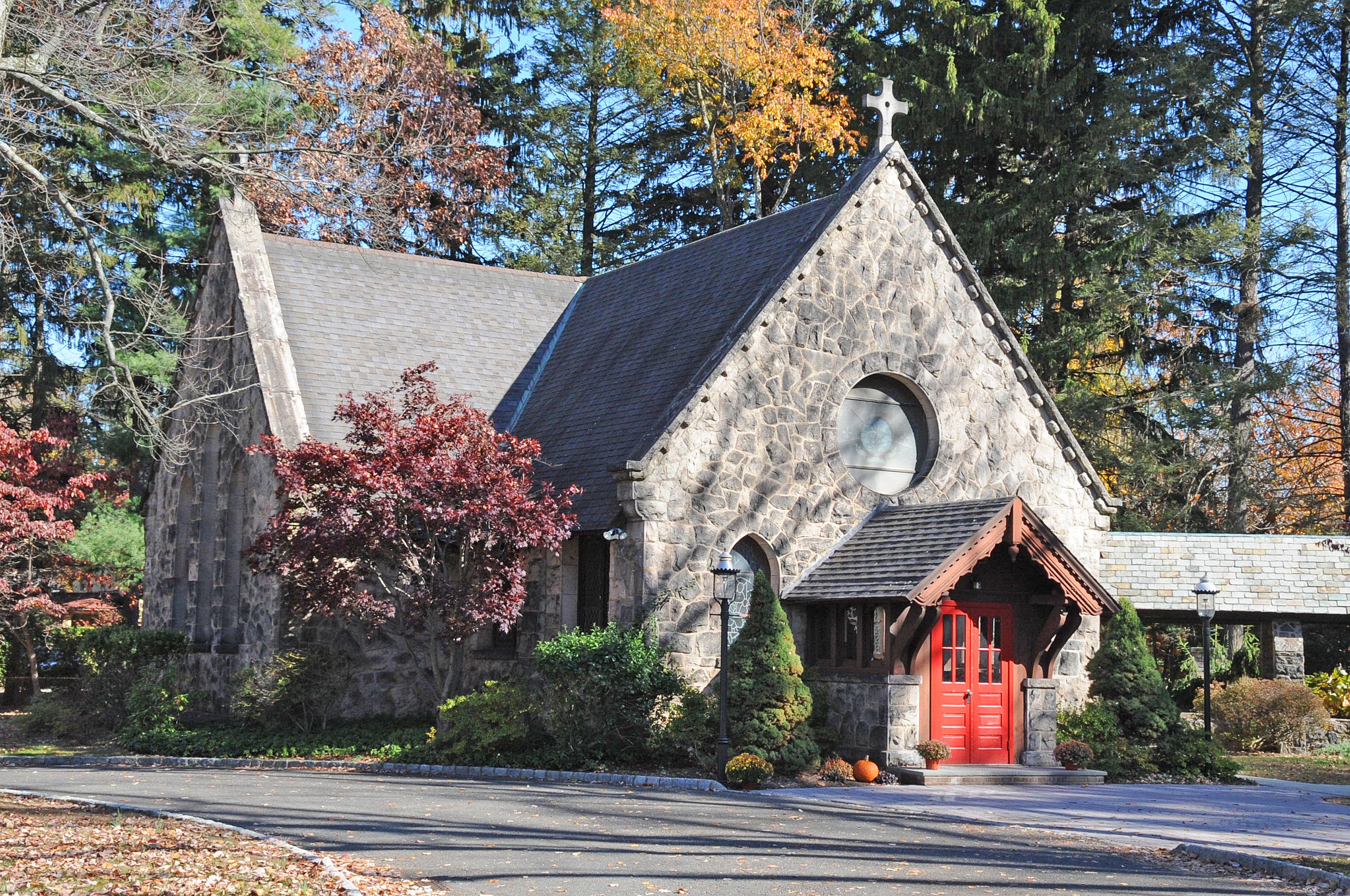
Church of the Holy Communion

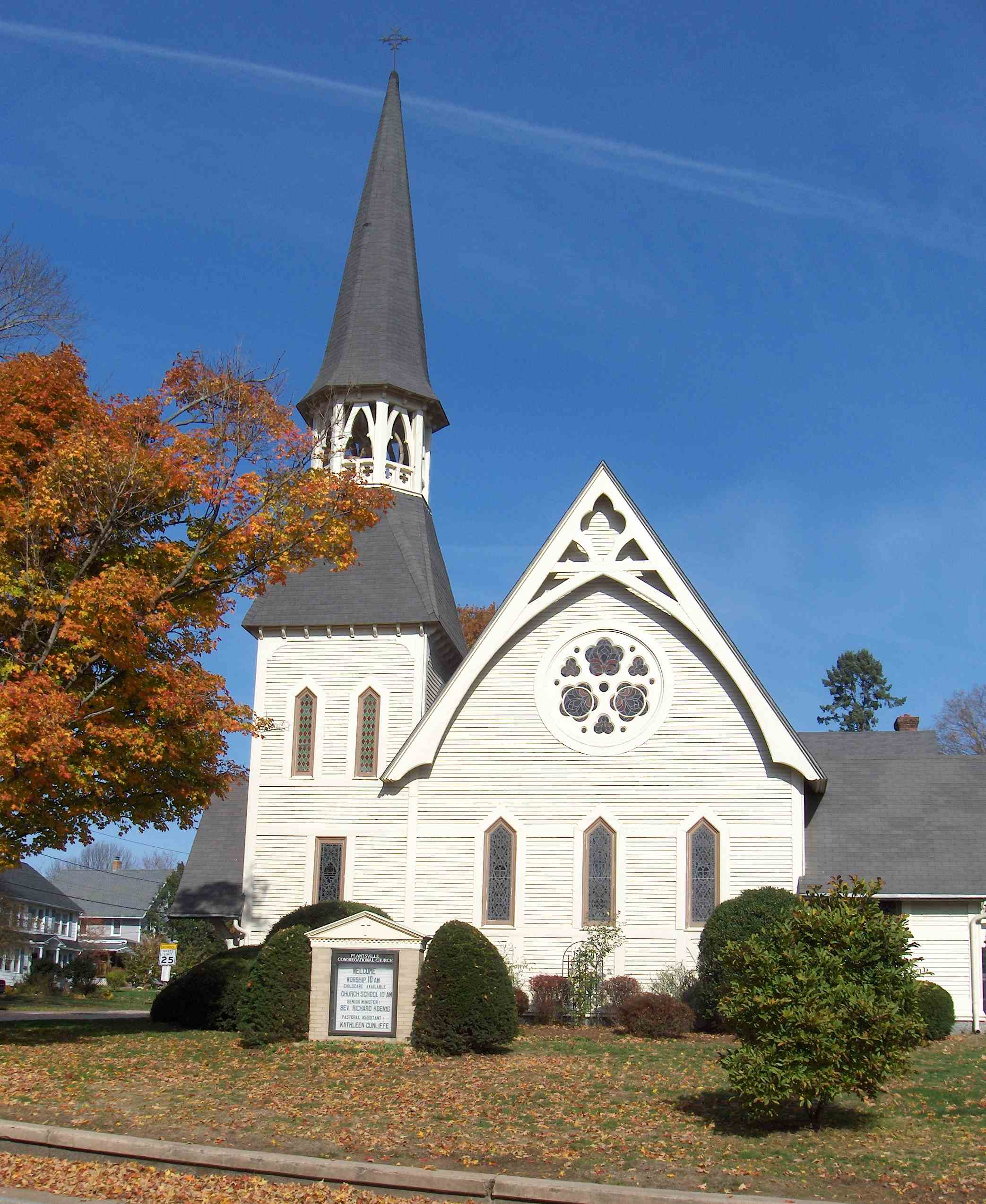
Plantsville Congregational Church

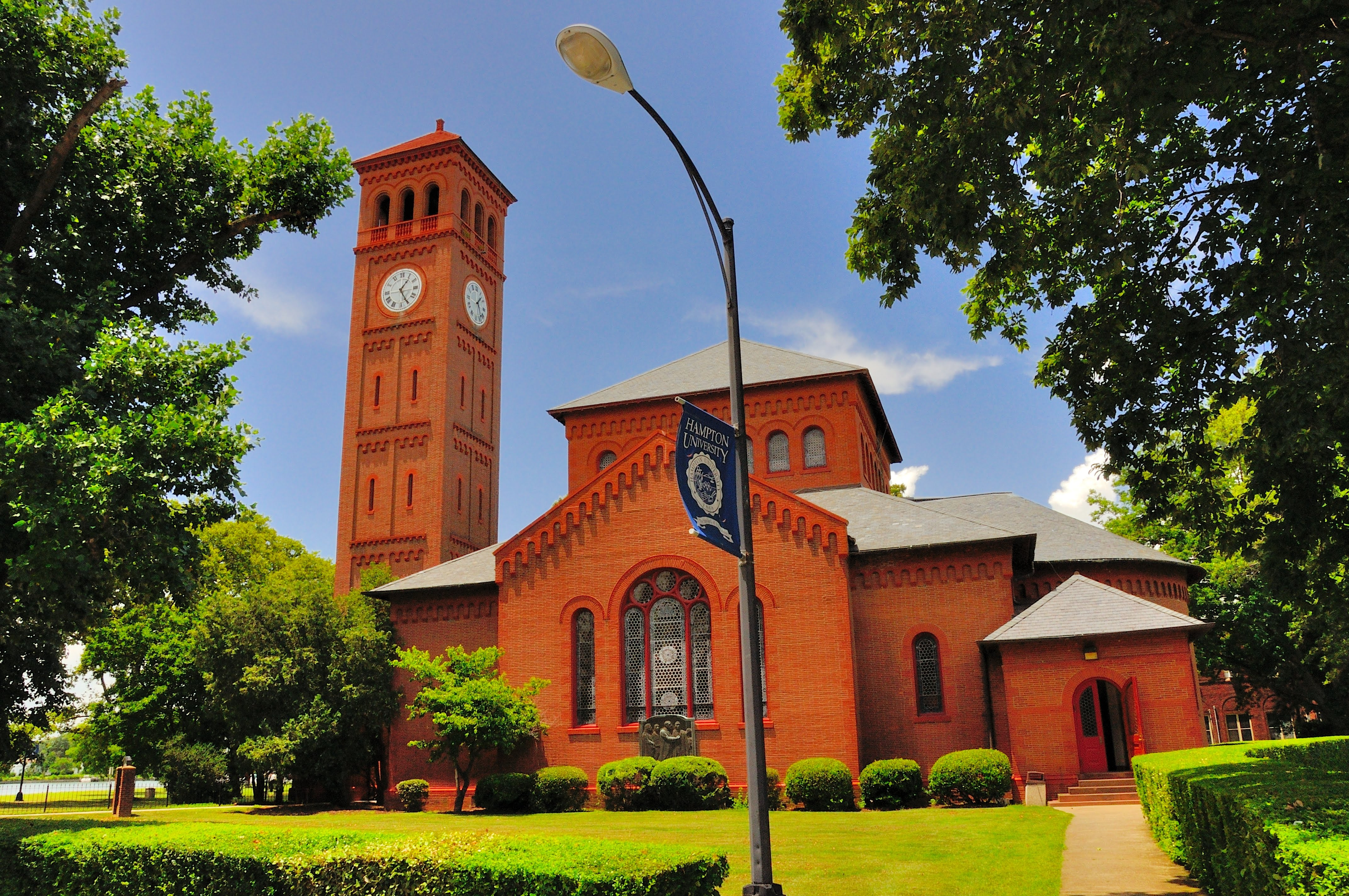
Hampton Memorial Church

Cady designed Fairfield Hall (1873), also known as Ladies Hall, which was the first brick building on campus. Its eclectic design combines Italianate and Second Empire styles in a three-story structure. He also designed the brick and wood Berea College Hospital (1908, razed 1954), which was turned into a dormitory called Morningside Cottage in 1925. Cady designed the Colonial Revival style Boone Tavern in 1909 as a hotel for Berea College. Around 1912, Frost asked his uncle to design a new teacher education building. As a gift to the college, Cady donated much of his time working on the project. Knapp Hall was dedicated on December 16, 1913. The small building housed 200 students, but Cady had designed it to use every space efficiently. To give the classrooms the best light possible, he extended the windows to the ceiling and placed the building on a true north axis. He also developed adjacent playgrounds.

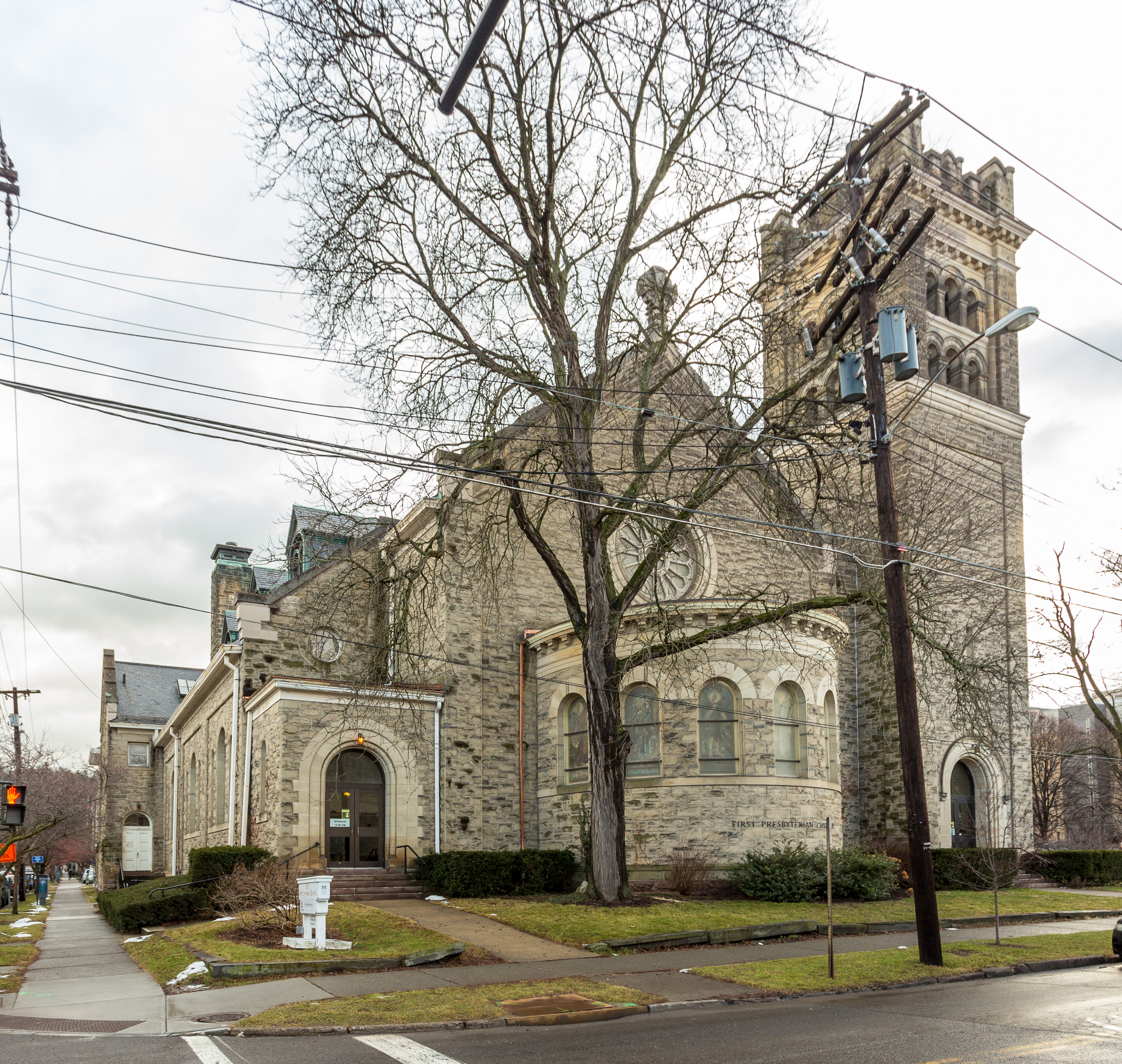
First Presbyterian Church, Ithaca, New York

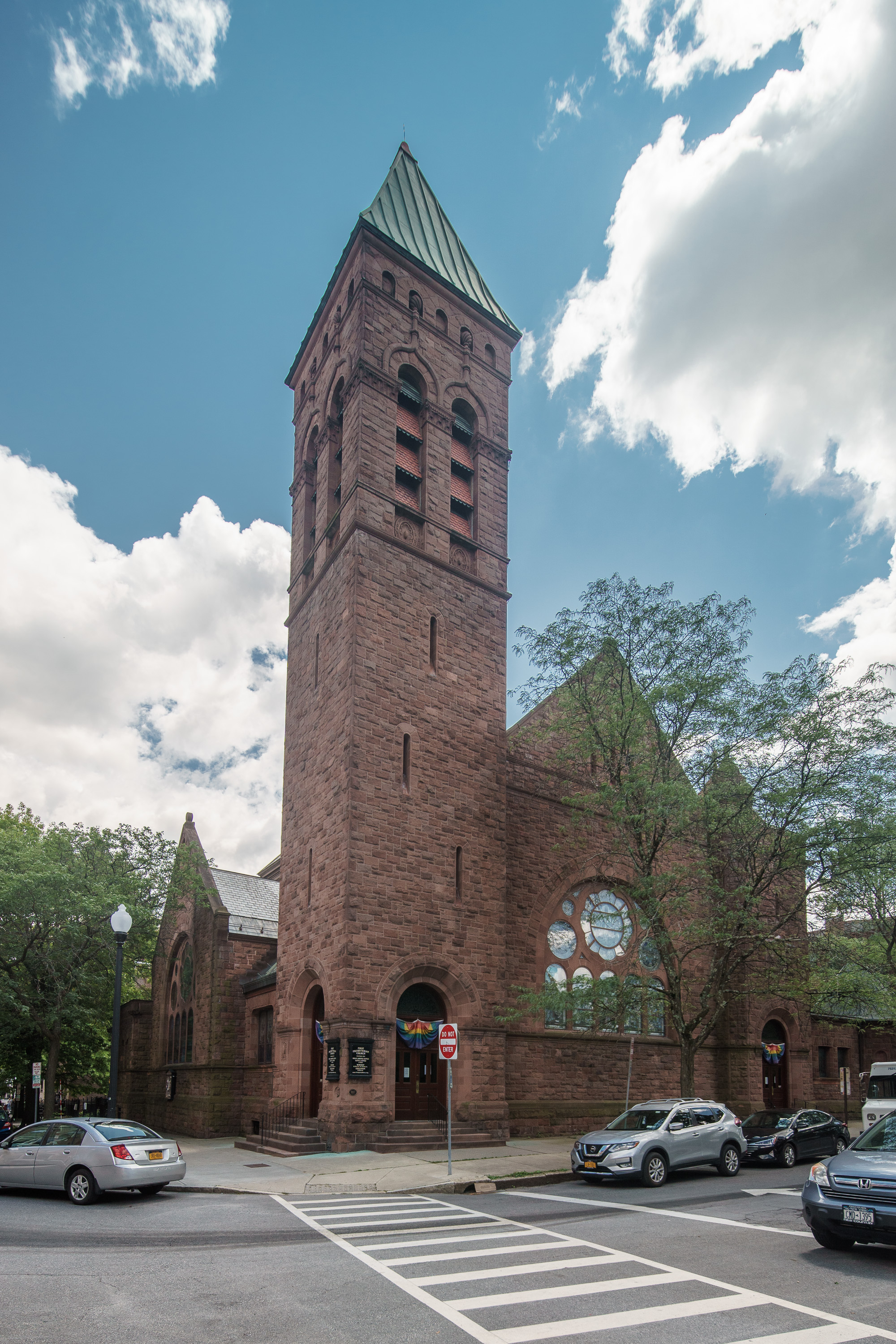
First Presbyterian Church, Albany New York

=== Churches ===
Cady is credited with designing 25 church buildings using a variety of styles. A Presbyterian, Cady avoided the traditional Anglican and Catholic cruciform plan but instead used the English "dissenting chapel" arrangement. Schuyler was complimentary of "the dignity and churchliness" of Cady's churches.

He designed two churches in Norwood, New Jersey in the Gothic revival style: the Alpine Community Church (1867) and the Church of the Holy Communion (1886–1888). He used Stick style or Carpenter Gothic style for the First Presbyterian Church of Oyster Bay (1873) in Oyster Bay, New York and the Plantsville Congregational Church (1866) in Southington, Connecticut. St. William's Catholic Church (1890) in Long Lake, New York was designed by Cady in the shingle style.

Cady used a traditional Byzantine church plan for the First Presbyterian Church (1889) in Wilkes-Barre, Pennsylvania and the Hampton Memorial Church (1886) at the Hampton Institute in Hampton, Virginia. The latter features a square tower that is 150 feet (46 m) tall and has a clock on all four sides. Inside, the wood trim is adorned with carved African American faces, and the yellow pine pews were built by students from the Hampton trade school.

Cady's preferred style for churches was Romanesque Revival, including the Church of the Redeemer in Paterson, New Jersey; First Church Congregational in Fairfield, Connecticut; First Presbyterian Church (1882–1884) in Albany, New York; First Presbyterian Church (1901) in Ithaca, New York; Good Shepherd–Faith Presbyterian Church (1887–1893) in New York City; Presbyterian Church in Greenwich, Connecticut; South Street Presbyterian Church (1878) of Morristown, New Jersey; and the Webb Memorial Church in Madison, New Jersey.

Some of his many churches in New York City include the Broome Street Tabernacle (1884–1885), First Presbyterian Church on Brownell Street, Forsyth Street Synagogue (1890) which is now the Seventh Day Adventist Church, Grace Methodist Episcopal Church (1895; demolished), Gustavus Adolphus Swedish Lutheran Church (1887), New York Avenue Methodist Episcopal Church (1889–92) which is now Union United Methodist Church, Olivet Memorial Church, the Pilgrim Chapel for the Church of the Pilgrims (1878), the Presbyterian Church of the Covenant at the Mission (1871), St. Andrew's Methodist Church (1889–90) which is now West Side Institutional Synagogue, and St. Paul's German Lutheran Church of Williamsburgh.

One of his church designs was replicated several times. In 1880, he designed the Church of the Good Shepherd at Raquette Lake, New York. In 1881, those plans were modified at the request of Harriet Beecher Stowe for the Church of Our Saviour in Mandarin, Florida. The plans were used again in 1883 for the Church of the Good Shepherd in Beattystown, New Jersey.

=== Health and welfare ===
The New York Association for Improving the Condition of the Poor (AICP) hired Cady, Berg & See to design the People's Bath at 9 Centre Market Place on the Lower East Side. Curran says this became "one of the most successful and well-publicized public baths in nineteenth-century America." As a result, the firm became the official architect for future designs of municipal baths in New York City.

In 1895, they were asked to submit a design for a grander bath facility for Tompkins Square Park—it was to include baths. This was to be the first in a group of five similar bathhouses. However, the community protested against having such a facility in their park, and it was never built. Later, New York City used a reworked version of their design for the Rivington Street Baths. The AICP criticized New York City and the architects for what they called "a pretentious brick structure", finding it too grand, too large, and too expensive for the bathhouse scheme they had in mind.

Cady designed the Hudson Street Hospital (1893), Presbyterian Hospital (1886), and the New York Skin and Cancer Hospital (1898). His firm also designed a House of Relief (1894) on Hudson Street near the Hudson Street Hospital, both of which were operated by the New York Hospital. This five-story House of Relief with its distinctive twin stairway was used for clinical and emergency services.

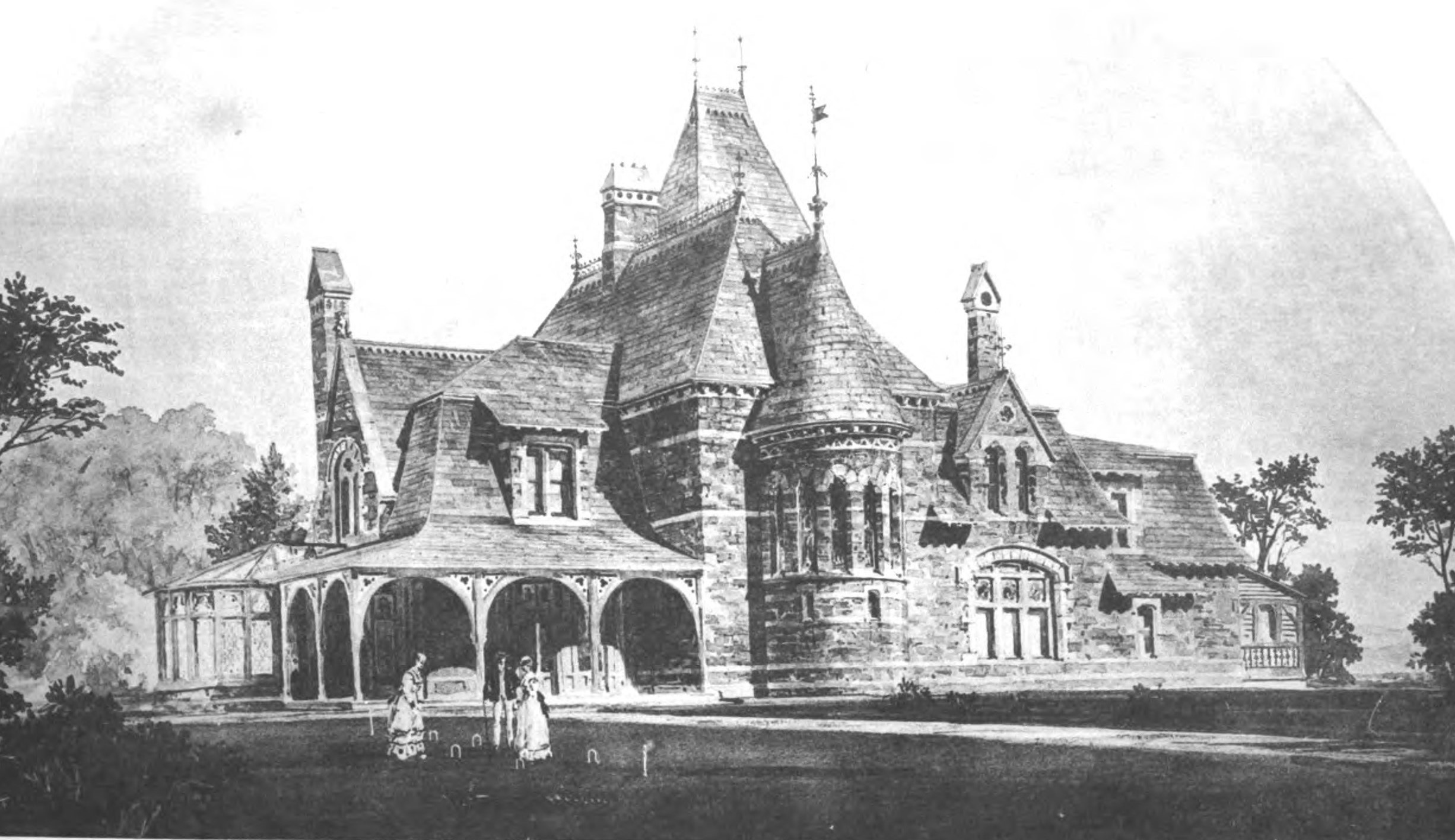
Design For A Country House, 1874

Cady, Berg & See also designed the Christian Home for Intemperate Men (1881) on Madison Avenue, a Home for Old Men and Aged Couples (1897, demolished 1973) at Morningside Heights, and the Protestant Half Orphan Asylum (1893) on Manhattan Avenue.

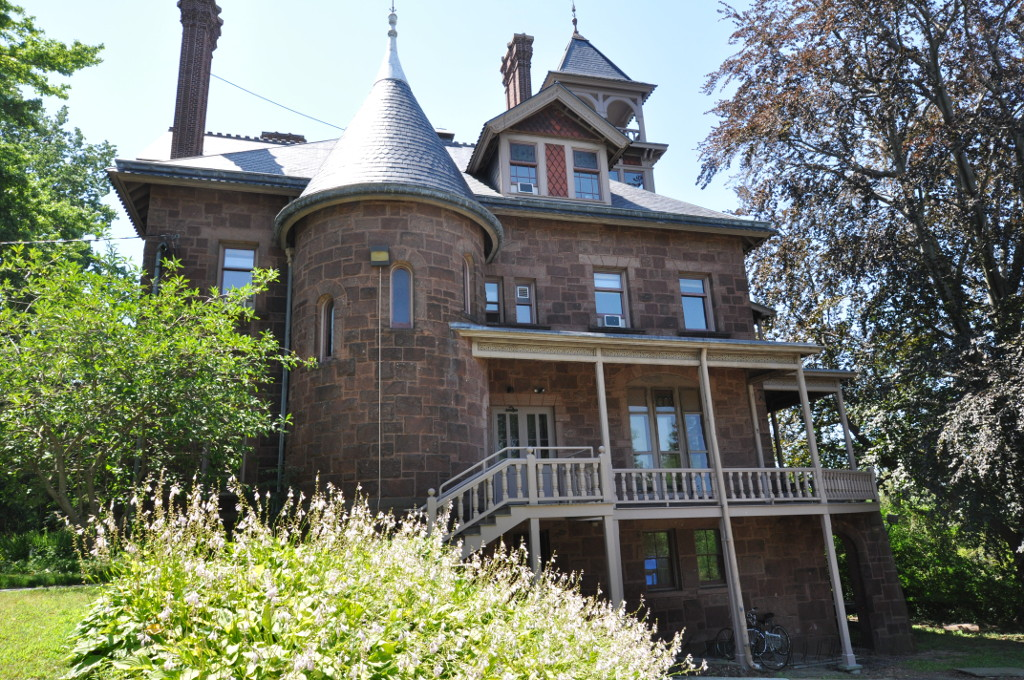
Othniel C. Marsh House

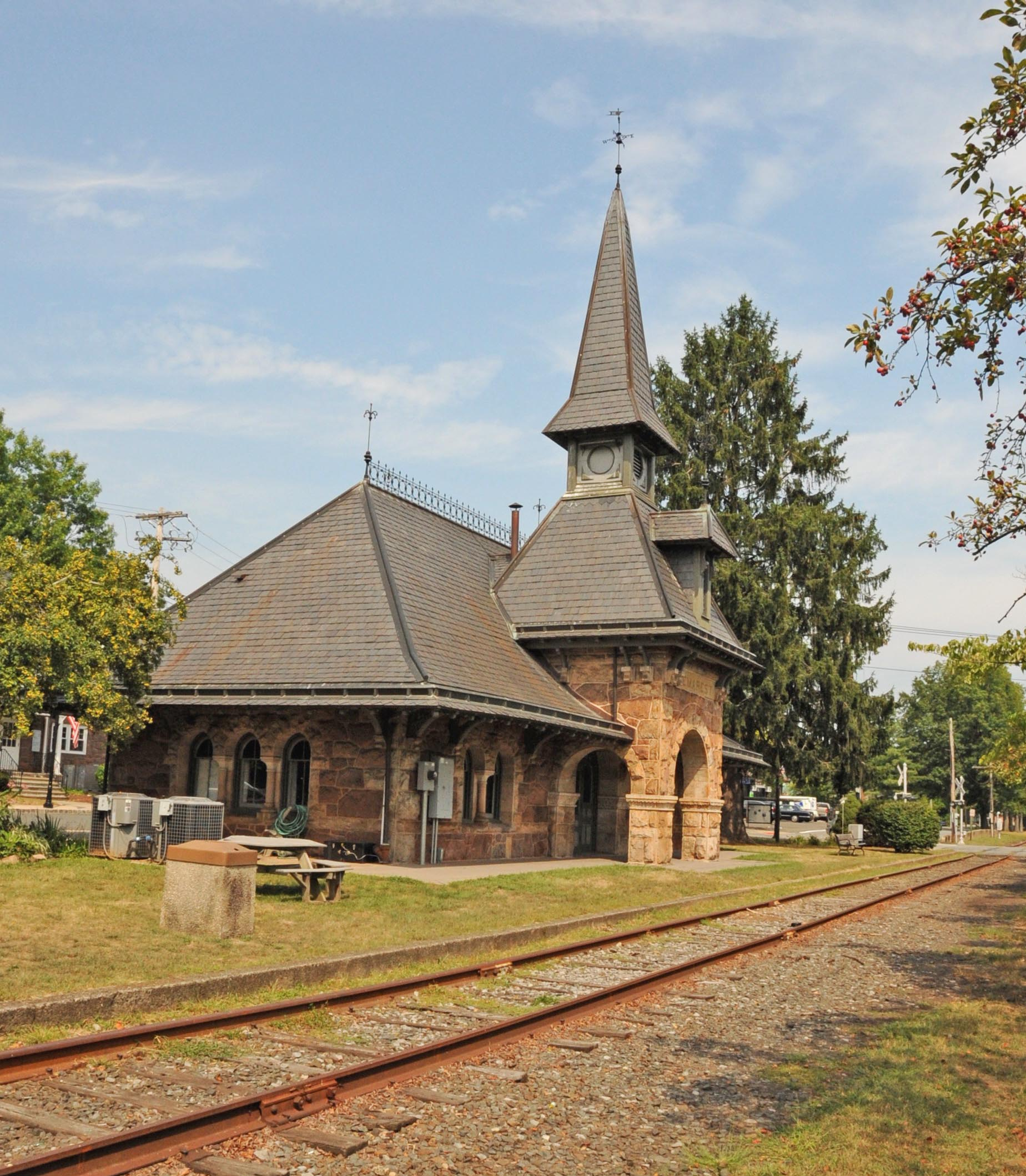
Demarest Railroad Depot

=== Residential ===
In 1865, Cady designed the Nordhoff estate for Mr. and Mrs. Charles Nordhoff in Alpine, New Jersey. In the February 1874 edition of The New–York Sketch–Book of Architecture, Cady shared a design for a Country-Home. Cady, Berg & See designed around fifteen residential projects in New York City including those at 57–65 East 90th Street in Manhattan which are now in the Carnegie Hill Historic District and 16 and 8–4 Pierrepont Street in the Brooklyn Heights Historic District.

Designed by Cady, the Romanesque Revival style Othniel C. Marsh House was built from 1875 to 1881 in New Haven. At the time, the Marsh House was different from the Queen Anne style that was popular in New Haven. The New Haven Preservation Trust says the "fortress-like mansion" merges Jacobean revival style with some Queen Anne details. A professor of paleontology at Yale, Marsh left his home to the university. The building is a National Historic Landmark.

In 1876, Cady designed Cliffside, a Dutch Colonial Revival-style stone mansion in Palisades, New York, for Lynda and Henry Lawrence. He designed the Charles H. Farnam Residence at 28 Hillhouse Avenue in New Haven in 1884 for attorney Charles Henry Farnam. With arched windows and an octagonal corner tower, Its design is eclectic but has similarities to Dutch Colonial style. Yale University has owned the Farnam house since 1920 and uses it for the Department of Economics.

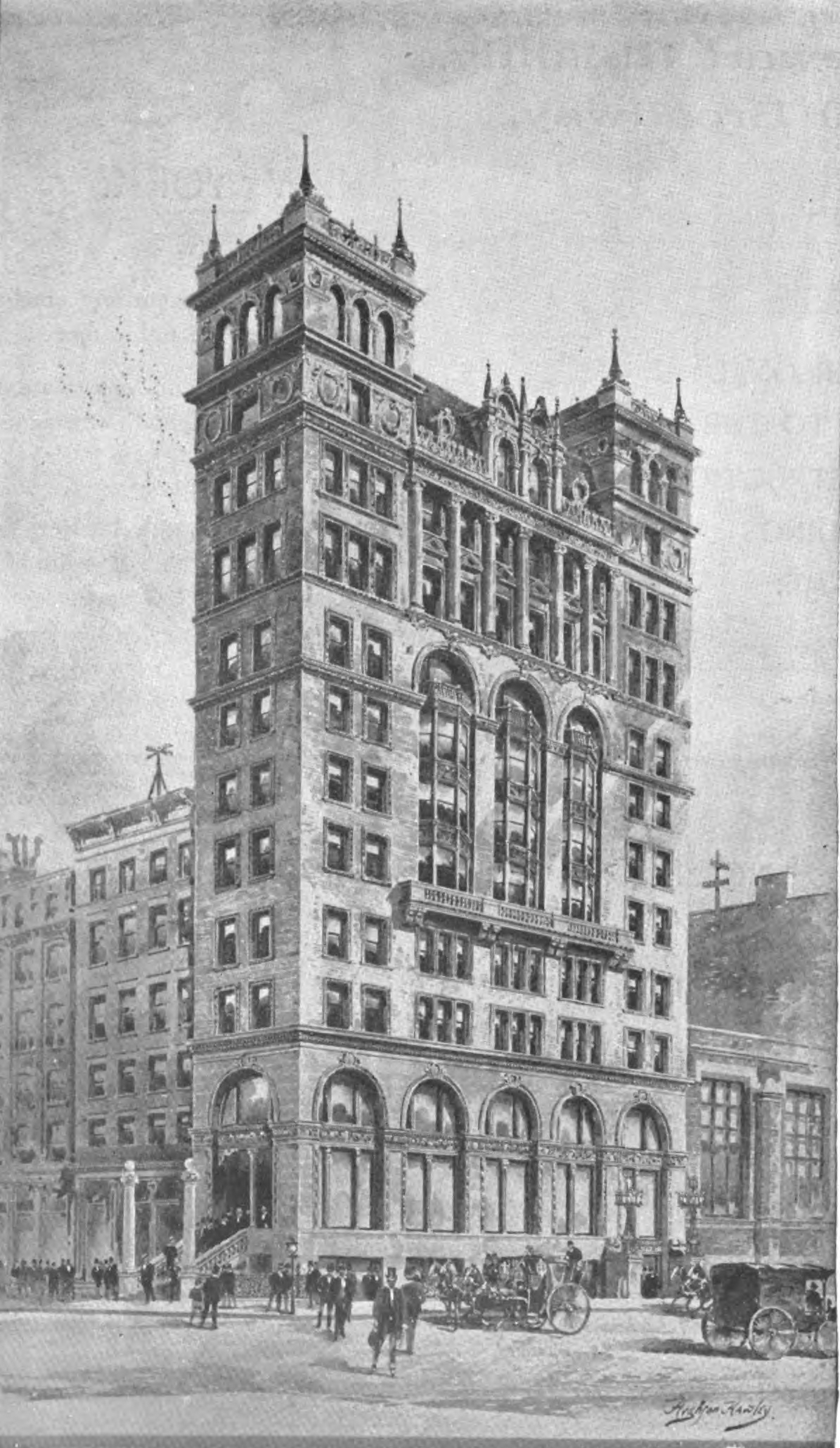
Shoe and Leather Bank

=== Commercial ===
In 1872, Cady designed the Demarest Railroad Depot in Bergen County, New Jersey. In 1878, he designed an office in Dutch Colonial style for Harper Brother's Publishing House. American Architect and Building News said, "The whole room is the quaintest of quaint—a place to linger in."

Cady designed four commercial buildings that were considered skyscrapers in their day—the nine-story Gallatin Bank Building (1886, demolished) in New York City, the ten-story Lancashire Fire Insurance Company (1889) in New York City, the twelve-story Shoe and Leather Bank (1893) in New York City, and the Phoenix Mutual Life Insurance Company (1897, demolished) in Hartford, Connecticut. The seven-story retail and residential towers of the Metropolitan Opera House were also considered skyscrapers.

Cady was Richard Morris Hunt's biggest rival for the Tribune Tower competition, although the latter eventually won and designed the building in New York. However, Cady published his design in the July 1874 edition of The New–York Sketch–Book of Architecture.

== Personal life ==
In 1859, Cady married Julia Bulkley, daughter of the pioneering dermatologist Dr. Henry D. Bulkley of New York. They had one daughter, Alice Cleaveland Cady, before Julia died in 1869 from an inflammation of the lungs. In a letter to her parents, his niece Lavinia Goodell wrote, "Poor Cleveland will feel the loss very deeply for he thought everything of her. The babe is only ten months old."

Cady built a summer home in Alpine, New Jersey in 1876. He married Emma Matilda Bulkley, the sister of his first wife, in 1881. She was a native of Orange, New Jersey, and was the second daughter of Dr. Bulkley. They had three children, including Julia Bulkley Cady, Cleaveland Cady, and Lyndon Bulkley Cady.

Cady was a devoted Presbyterian who served as head of the Sunday school at the Presbyterian Church of the Covenant for 53 years. He was president of the National Federation of Churches and a member of the Religious Education Association. Cady also ran weekly prayer meetings at the Covenant Mission at the Presbyterian Church of the Covenant. He was vice–president of the New York City Mission for ten years, serving on the board for seventeen years. He was a trustee of Berea College, governor of the Presbyterian Hospital, and president of the New York Skin and Cancer Hospital. He was a member of the Alpine Club, the Century Association, the Quill Club, and the St. Anthony Club of New York.

On April 17, 1919, Cady died in his home at 214 Riverside Drive after two months of illness. He was buried at Woodlawn Cemetery in the Bronx, New York.

== Selected projects ==
Following is a list of some of the surviving buildings that Cady designed. Many of these structures are listed on the National Register of Historic Places (NRHP), are part of a National Register Historic District (NRHD) or a Local Historic District (LHD), or are a National Historic Landmark (NHL).

Project	Date	Address	City and state	Firm	Status	Ref.
Plantsville Congregational Church	1866	99 Church Street	Southington, Connecticut	J. Cleaveland Cady, Architect	NRHP	(Note: The church is part of the Plattsville Historic District.)
Alpine Community Church	1867–1871		Alpine, New Jersey	J. Cleaveland Cady, Architect	NRHD	(Note: The church is part of the Upper Closter–Alpine Historic District.)
Church of the Covenant Chapel	1871	310 E 42nd Street	Manhattan, New York	J. Cleaveland Cady, Architect	LHD	(Note: The church is part of New York City's Tudor City Historic District.)
Demarest Station	1872	38 Park Street	Demarest, New Jersey	J. Cleaveland Cady, Architect	NRHP	
First Presbyterian Church of Oyster Bay	1873	60 East Main Street	Oyster Bay, New York	J. Cleaveland Cady, Architect	NRHP	
Cliffside	1876	Lawrence Lane	Palisades, New York	J. Cleaveland Cady, Architect	NRHP	
Church of the Holy Communion	1877, 1886–1888	66 Summit Street	Norwood, New Jersey	J. C. Cady & Company	NRHP	
Barron Library	1878	582 Rahway Avenue	Woodbridge Township, New Jersey	J. Cleaveland Cady, Architect	NRHP	
Othniel C. Marsh House	1878	360 Prospect Street	New Haven, Connecticut	J. Cleaveland Cady, Architect	NHL	
Saint Anthony Hall	1878	340 Summit Street	Hartford, Connecticut	J. Cleaveland Cady, Architect	NRHP	
South Street Presbyterian Church	1878	57 East Park Place	Morristown , New Jersey.	J. Cleaveland Cady, Architect	NRHD	(Note: The church is part of the Morristown Historic District.)
Church of the Good Shepherd	1880	St. Hubert's Isle	Raquette Lake, New York	J. Cleaveland Cady, Architect		.
First Presbyterian Church of Albany	1882–1884	Wilett and State Streets	Albany, New York	J. C. Cady & Company	NRHD	
Charles Henry Farnam House	1884	28 Hillhouse Avenue Yale University	New Haven, Connecticut	J. C. Cady & Company	NRHD	(Note: This house is part of the Hillhouse Avenue Historic District.)
Hampton University Memorial Church	1886	Hampton University	Hampton, Virginia	J. C. Cady & Company		
Church of the Good Shepherd	1887	152 West 66th Street	Manhattan, New York	J. C. Cady & Company		
First Roumanian-American Congregation	1889–1893	89–93 Rivington Street	Manhattan, New York	J. C. Cady & Company	NRHP	(Note: This project included renovations to an existing structure; it cost approximately $36,000 ($1,173,000 in 2022). The church was demolished on March 3, 2006.)
First Presbyterian Church	1889	97 South Franklin Street	Wilkes-Barre, Pennsylvania	J. C. Cady & Company	NRHD	(Note: The church is part of the River Street Historic District.)
St. William's Catholic Church	1890	Long Point on Raquette Lake	Long Lake, New York	J. C. Cady & Company	NRHP	
Chittenden Hall (aka Memorial Library)	1889–1890	Yale University	New Haven, Connecticut	Cady, Berg & See		
Yale Infirmary	1892	276 Prospect Street Yale University	New Haven, Connecticut	Cady, Berg & See		
Watson Hall (aka Sheffield Chemical Laboratory)	1894	51 Prospect Street Yale University	New Haven, Connecticut	Cady, Berg & See		
Hendrie Hall	1894–1900	Between Chapel and Grove Streets Yale University	New Haven, Connecticut	Cady, Berg & See		
American Museum of Natural History	1899	200 Central Park West	New York, New York	Cady, Berg & See	NRHP	
First Presbyterian Church of Ithaca	1901	315 North Cayuga Street	Ithaca, New York	Cady, Berg & See	NRHD	(Note: The church is part of the De Witt Park Historic District.)
Grace Episcopal Church	1901–1902	15515 Jamaica Avenue	Queens, New York	Cady, Berg & See	NRHP	
St. George Tucker Hall	1908–1909	350 James Blair Drive	Williamsburg, Virginia	Cady & See		
Boone Tavern	1909	100 Main Street	Berea, Kentucky	Cady & See	NRHP	
Third Presbyterian Church North	1909	Ridge Street and Abbington Avenue	Newark, New Jersey	Cady & Gregory		
