= Church of the Covenant (Manhattan) =

Presbyterian church in Manhattan, New York

Coordinates: 40°44′58″N 73°58′18″W

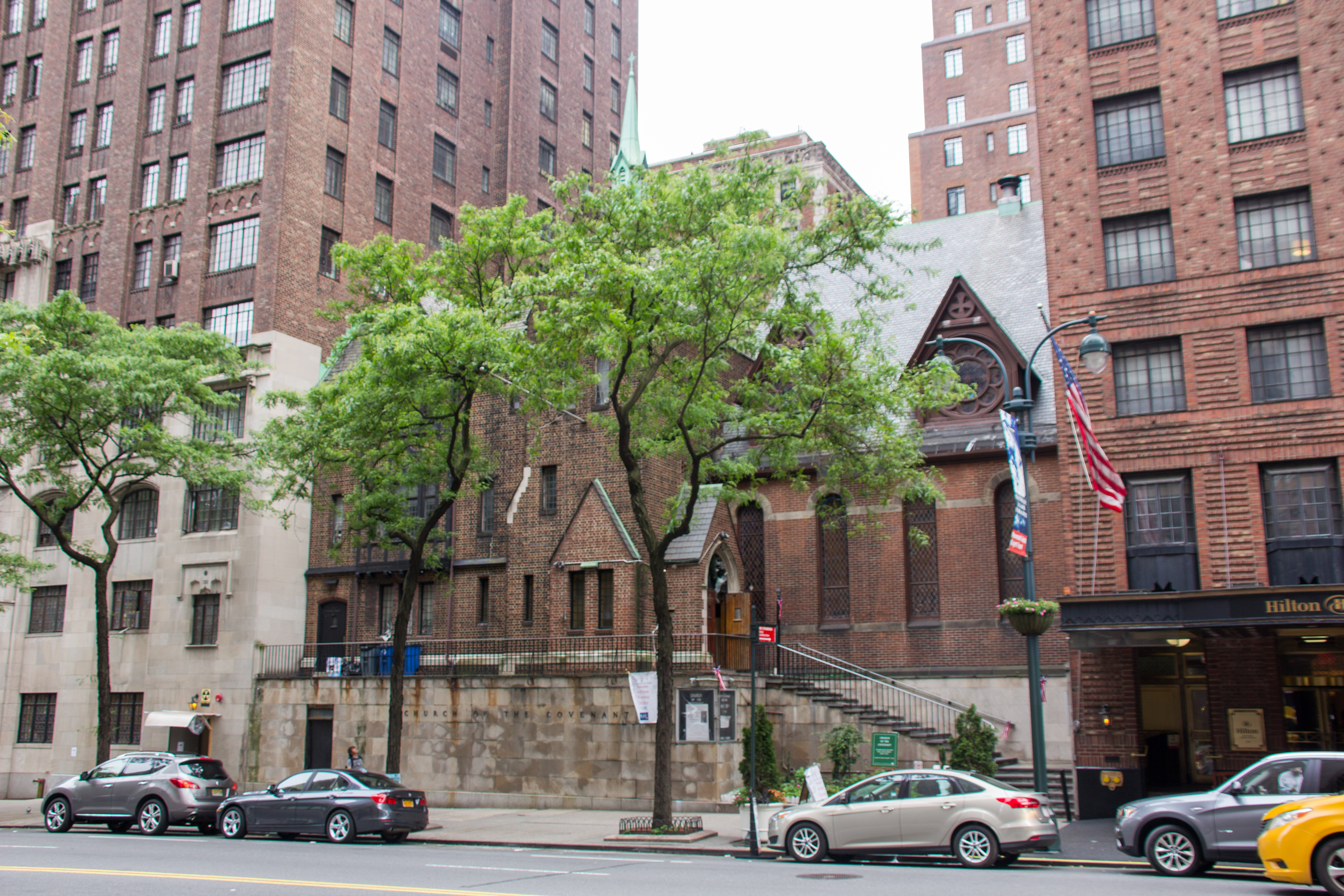
Church of the Covenant

The Church of the Covenant, often referred to as "the church of the United Nations" due to its proximity to the headquarters of the United Nations, is a late-19th-century church located on 42nd Street in Midtown Manhattan, New York City. The original Church of the Covenant was founded in 1860 by the Rev. Dr. George L. Prentiss. In 1870, the church established a mission called Covenant Chapel, which grew and eventually become self-supporting and stronger than the founding church. In 1893 the name "Church of the Covenant" was transferred to Covenant Chapel, while the remaining members of the original church group merged with the Brick Church (another historic New York City church). In 1947, the Adams-Parkhurst Presbyterian Church merged into the Church of the Covenant.

== Founding ==
The Church of the Covenant was founded in New York City in 1860 by the Rev. Dr. George L. Prentiss, formerly pastor of the Mercer Street Presbyterian Church, who had just returned from Europe. Friends and former parishioners of Prentiss immediately began a movement for the establishment of a new church on Murray Hill with the Bowdoin College graduate at its head. The church was formed in the New School movement (Liberal Presbyterian), which fully embraced Revivalism.

=== Initial locations ===
The church initially held services in the chapel of the Home for the Friendless on East 23rd Street. Prentiss gave his first sermon on Sunday November 25, 1860, nineteen days after the election of President Lincoln, and more than four months before the attack on Fort Sumter. In the autumn of 1861, the church moved to Dodworth's new studio building, on the corner of Fifth Avenue and 26th Street. There on the evening of March 21, 1862, at a meeting of the eight-three member congregation, the church was organized, and three ruling elders were appointed.

=== Name ===
"It was a question of some interest," says Dr. Prentiss, "what the name should be. A strong repugnance was felt to the custom of calling a Christian sanctuary, and the Christian people who occupied it, after a street or a corner of a street and avenue. To say nothing of the question of taste, the historical identity of some of our most important churches had thereby, upon the removal of the congregation to a new locality, been wholly lost to the public mind. After a good deal of conversation on the subject, we unanimously adopted the Church of the Covenant. It has become a name exceedingly endeared to us and to many all over the land."

=== First building, Park Avenue & 35th (1865) ===
The church having been named and duly organized, as yet had no place of worship of its own. Despite the raging [American Civil] war, the church leaders forged ahead and a mere ten months later the cornerstone was laid on November 5, 1863. The chapel was completed in May 1864, and the church itself was opened and dedicated on April 30, 1865. A parsonage was added in 1867. Total cost was $160,000.

The Romanesque style building was designed by James Renwick Jr., the noted architect of St. Patrick's Cathedral, was located on the northwest corner of Fourth (Park) Avenue and 35th Street. Renwick also designed All Saints Catholic Church and Grace Church in New York City, and the Smithsonian Institution in Washington, D.C.

=== Covenant Mission ===
Early on the church started on a young men's prayer group on the East side with rented space over a stable at No. 206 East Fortieth Street, close to the site of the present church. The growth of the mission was strong and after a few years the need of larger, more suitable quarters was needed. The church wanted the facility to be "the most attractive place its worshippers should find in all the week."

A "Dedication Hymn" was written for this occasion by Mrs. Elizabeth Prentiss:

Thankfully, O Lord, we come
To this new and happy home;
Wilt thou not from heaven descend.
Here to dwell as friend with friend,
Granting us the wondrous grace
To behold thee face to face?

=== Covenant Chapel (1871) ===
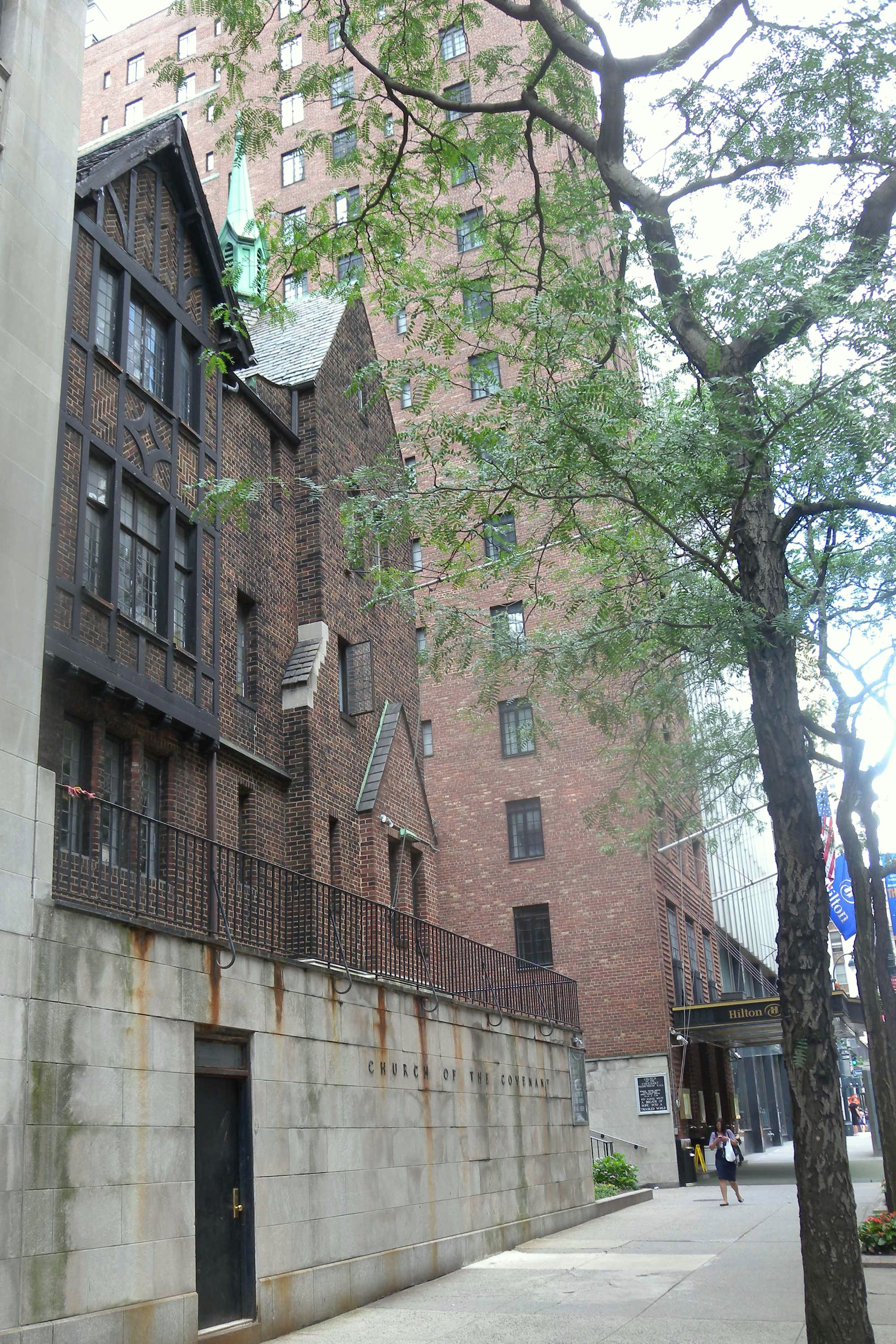
The church is located at 310 East 42nd Street

The church grew quickly and was soon in need of additional facilities. A plot of ground was purchased at 310 East 42nd Street near Second Avenue close to the Covenant Mission and what was to become known as the Mission Chapel was built at a cost of $50,000. The facility, designed by architect J. Cleveland Cady, was dedicated in December 1871.

The new chapel of the Church of the Covenant was designed to be a memorial of the reunion of the Old School and New School, which had reconciled in 1869 at an historic eight-day conference with the Old School meeting at the Brick Church on 5th Avenue and 37th street and the New School at the Church of the Covenant on Park and 35th. A joint prayer meeting was held on Friday May 28 to mark the reunion of the two great churches.

== Merger with the Brick Church ==
In a show of faith in the greater church mission, the Church of the Covenant decided to sell its valuable Park Avenue property to create an endowment for a new church merged with the historic Brick Church, in order to ensure that one strong Presbyterian church might endure in the center of Manhattan for the years to come.

== New Church of the Covenant (1893) ==
Under the terms of the agreement between the Brick Church and the Church of the Covenant, the two congregations would merge, the two pastors would be retained and the Fifth Avenue property of the Church of the Covenant would be transferred to the Brick Church Corporation, which would retain its name for the combined church.

It was also agreed that the Covenant Chapel (or Mission Chapel), would be organized as an independent church with four officials of the Mother church serving in similar capacities to lead the newly independent church. The New Church of the Covenant was organized on November 30, 1893, and was called "The Church of the Covenant," "in order that that dear and familiar name, now to be laid aside by the parent organization, might be continued in the child." Hence, the new Church of the Covenant was born and exists to this day.

== Merger with Adams-Parkhurst Memorial Presbyterian Church (1947) ==
The Adams-Parkhurst Memorial Church was organized in 1856 as a mission center of Madison Square Presbyterian Church. It was located on 207 East 30th Street at Third Avenue. In 1947, the congregation merged with the Church of the Covenant.
