= Marsh Hall =

Historic house in Connecticut, United States

- Othniel C. Marsh House
- U.S. National Register of Historic Places
- U.S. National Historic Landmark
- U.S. Historic district – Contributing property
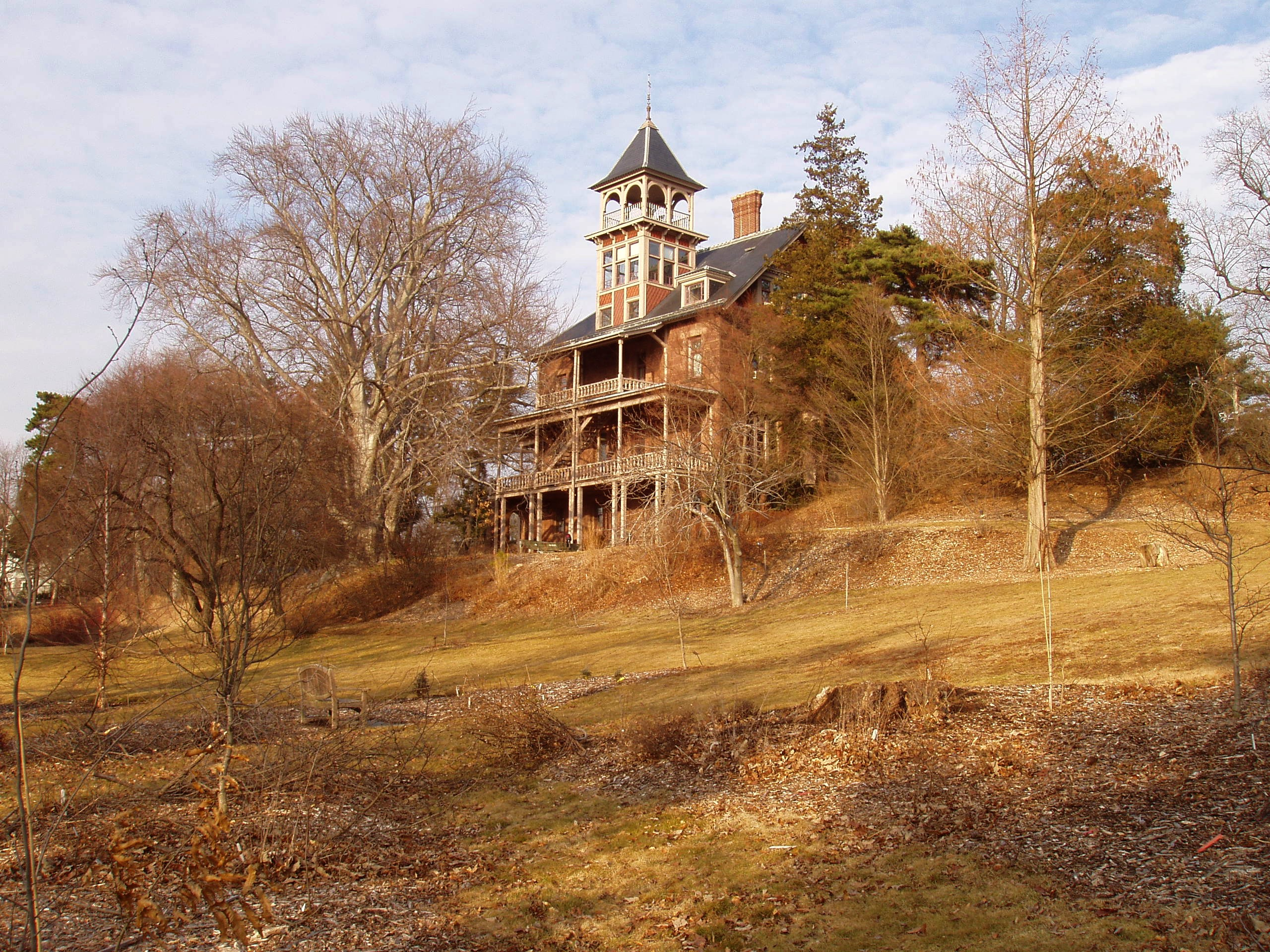
- Marsh Hall in 2006

- Location within Connecticut Location within the United States
- Location: 360 Prospect Street, New Haven, Connecticut
- Coordinates: 41°19′19″N 72°55′30″W
- Area: 6.8 acres (2.8 ha)
- Built: 1876
- Architect: J. Cleaveland Cady
- Architectural style: Queen Anne; Richardsonian Romanesque
- Part of: Prospect Hill Historic District (ID79002670)
- NRHP reference No.: 66000875

Significant dates
- Added to NRHP: October 15, 1966
- Designated NHL: January 12, 1965
- Designated CP: November 2, 1979

Marsh Hall, historically known as the Othniel C. Marsh House, is a historic house on Prospect Hill in New Haven, Connecticut. The property, which includes the house and a 6.8 acres (2.8 ha) grounds now known as Marsh Botanical Garden, was declared a National Historic Landmark in 1965. It was built in 1878 as the home of Othniel Marsh (1831–99), a leading 19th-century paleontologist, who occupied it until his death. The house is now owned by Yale University, and the building is occupied by the Yale School of the Environment.

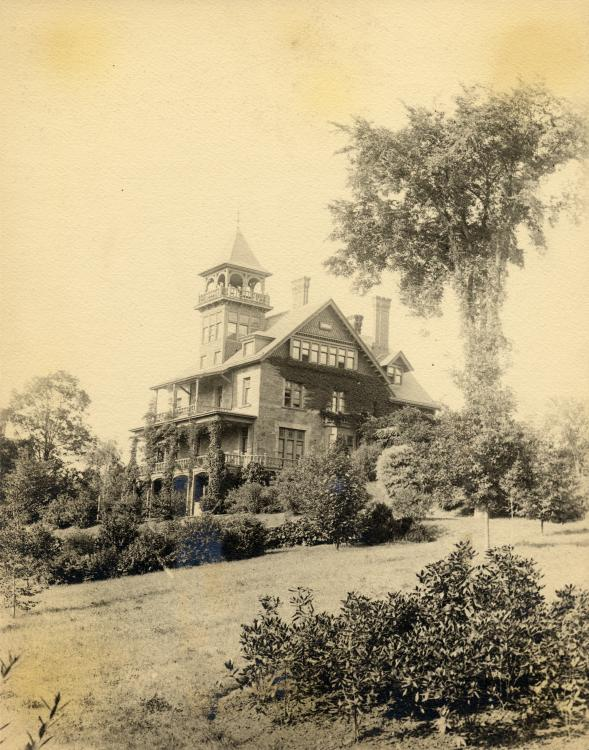
Early view of Othniel C. Marsh House

== Description and history ==
The house is a 3.5-story brownstone structure, built of red sandstone, overlooking an expanse of landscaped greenery. Its architecture is reminiscent of the Jacobean revival, with asymmetrical massing, and a variety of projections, turrets, and decorative elements. It was designed for Marsh by J. Cleaveland Cady, and construction of the exterior of the main house was largely complete in 1878; it took another three years to finish the interior. The house is one of a relatively small number of Cady designs surviving in the city, and was one of the grandest private residences in the city at the time of its construction.

Othniel Marsh had an interest in fossils from an early age, and studied geology at Yale. Before and after graduating he went on numerous collecting trips throughout northeastern North America, and was appointed the first professor of paleontology. He engaged in repeated expeditions into the American West, sometimes returning with spectacular finds of dinosaurs and other large vertebrates. His finds of Cretaceous winged dinosaurs, complete with teeth and other non-avian features, provided compelling evidence in the debate over the recently published theory of evolution by natural selection. Marsh, a bachelor, bequeathed his estate to the university.

Marsh Hall currently houses offices of the Yale School of the Environment (YSE), and is the home of The Forest School at YSE.

== See also ==
- List of National Historic Landmarks in Connecticut
- National Register of Historic Places listings in New Haven, Connecticut
