= Barron Library =

- U.S. National Register of Historic Places
- New Jersey Register of Historic Places
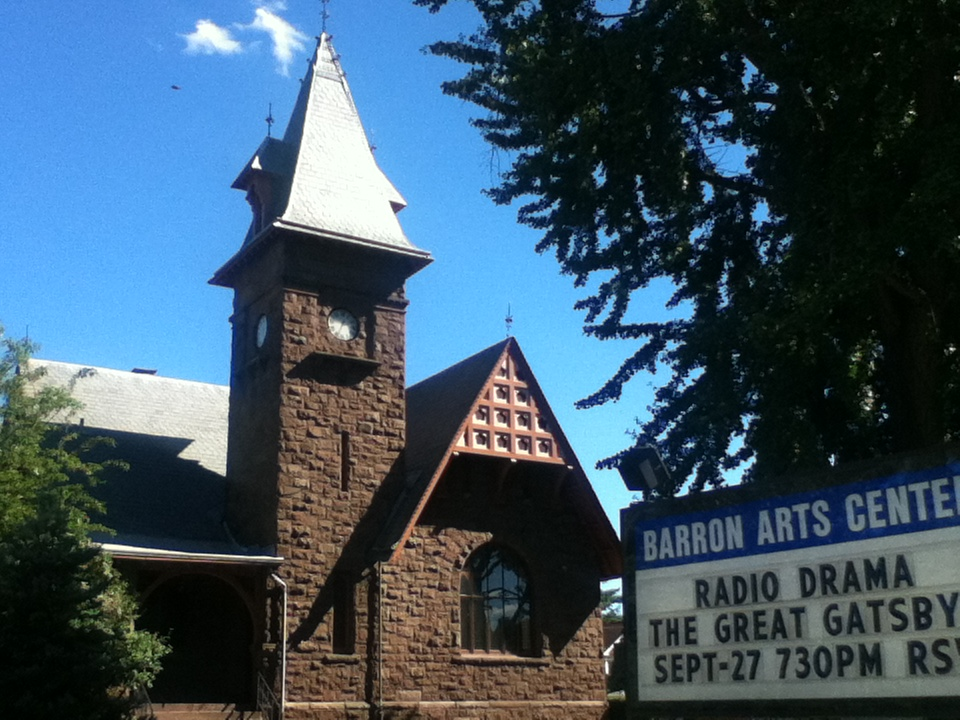
- Barron Arts Center

- Location within Middlesex County, New Jersey Location within New Jersey Location within the United States
- Location: 582 Rahway Avenue, Woodbridge Township, New Jersey
- Coordinates: 40°33′40″N 74°16′25″W
- Area: 0.7 acres (0.28 ha)
- Built: 1877
- Architect: J. Cleaveland Cady
- Architectural style: Richardsonian Romanesque
- NRHP reference No.: 77000886
- NJRHP No.: 1944

Significant dates
- Added to NRHP: November 11, 1977
- Designated NJRHP: August 26, 1977

The Barron Library is a historic building located at 582 Rahway Avenue in Woodbridge Township, Middlesex County, New Jersey. Formerly a public library, it is now the Barron Arts Center. The building was documented by the Historic American Buildings Survey in 1976. It was added to the National Register of Historic Places on November 11, 1977, for its significance in architecture and education.

== History and description ==
Thomas Barron (1790–1875) funded the construction of the building in his will. It would become the first free public library in Middlesex County. The brownstone building was designed by architect J. Cleaveland Cady in the Richardsonian Romanesque style and features a three-story clock tower. The fireplace in the Reading Room is bordered with blue and white Delft tiles, each depicting a biblical scene. The library was dedicated on September 11, 1877. In 1967, it became part of the Woodbridge Township Library System. In 1977, the building became the arts center for Woodbridge Township.

== See also ==
- National Register of Historic Places listings in Middlesex County, New Jersey
- List of museums in New Jersey
