= Boone Tavern =

- Boone Tavern Hotel
- U.S. National Register of Historic Places
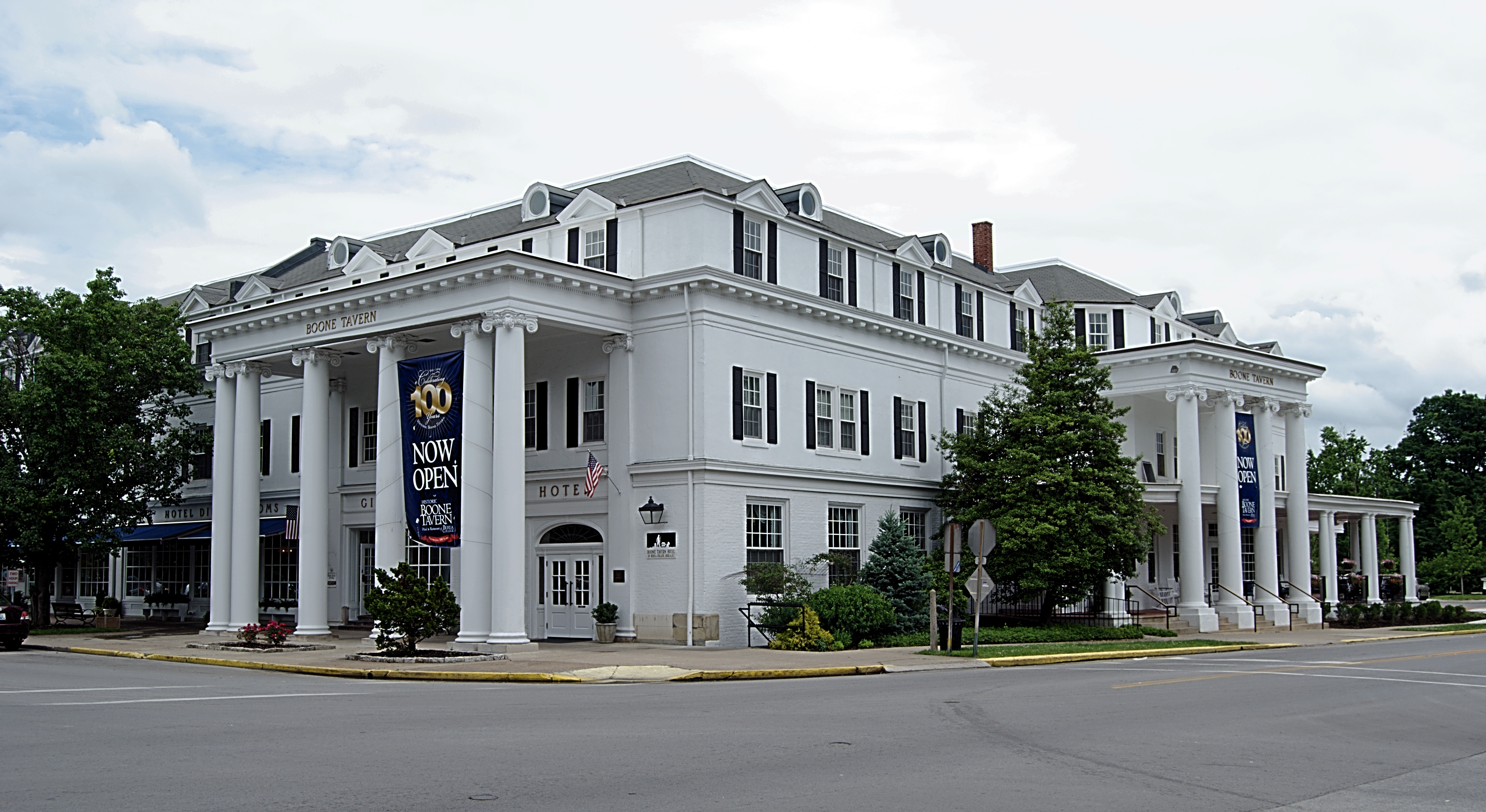
- Boone Tavern in 2009

- Location within Kentucky Location within the United States
- Location: 100 Main St., Berea, Kentucky
- Coordinates: 37°34′20″N 84°17′19″W
- Area: less than one acre
- Built: 1909
- Architect: Cady and See
- Architectural style: Colonial Revival
- NRHP reference No.: 95001527
- Added to NRHP: January 11, 1996

Boone Tavern is a restaurant, hotel, and guesthouse affiliated with Berea College in Berea, Madison County, Kentucky.

Boone Tavern Hotel of Berea College is a member of Historic Hotels of America, the official program of the National Trust for Historic Preservation.

== History ==
Boone Tavern was built in 1909 to house guests of the college. It is named for early Kentucky explorer Daniel Boone. The "Tavern" portion of the name derives from the historic definition that refers to a public inn for travelers rather than the modern definition related to the sale of alcoholic beverages.

Construction of Boone Tavern began in 1907 based on designs by the New York architect J. Cleaveland Cady of Cady & See. The building was built with bricks manufactured by students in the college's brickyard and was constructed by the college's Woodwork Department at a total cost of $20,000.

Located on the College Square in the heart of Berea where the old Dixie Highway crossed the campus, the hotel and restaurant became a popular destination with the traveling public from the beginning of the "automobile age." In the 1930s the establishment was featured in Duncan Hines' Adventures in Good Eating guidebooks. Under the direction of Richard T. Hougen, who headed the restaurant for 35 years beginning in 1940 and published three cookbooks, Boone Tavern established a reputation for fine Southern cooking.

== Management ==
Boone Tavern is owned by Berea College and students make up about 15% of the staff at the hotel and restaurant. Guest rooms feature solid cherry wood furniture made by Berea College Student Crafts. Berea is a work college whose students are required to work at least ten hours per week at Boone Tavern or another college department or work area in exchange for receiving a tuition-free college education.

In 2008, the college undertook an extensive renovation project on Boone Tavern at an estimated cost of $9.6 million, with the aim of converting it into Kentucky's first LEED-certified hotel while preserving its historic character. The renovation was projected to be completed in May 2009. Planned changes included replacing the hotel's kitchen and service elevator, increasing the number of guest rooms from 58 to 64, restoring skylights in the dining room, and adding a new two-story portico entrance on the east facade.

Currently, alcohol can be sold now at Boone Tavern's restaurant, and diners can legally purchase alcohol in the restaurant; hotel guests can also bring alcohol into their rooms. Before April 2012, Berea had been the largest city in the state with no provision for legal alcohol sales. In that month, the precinct that includes Boone Tavern voted in favor of allowing sales of alcohol by the drink at its restaurant. The vote was held under a Kentucky law that allows such a vote with regard to state-defined "qualified historic sites". However, the college's board of trustees chose not to sell alcohol until fall of 2014. The college was historically opposed to alcohol, and according to the then-current president of the college, a decision to approve alcohol sales would "put us in an awkward position" with two other restaurants that rent space in buildings attached to the tavern. Those two restaurants would not be allowed to sell alcohol because the attached buildings are not classified as "qualified historic sites" under the aforementioned law. As of 2022, the Boone Tavern Restaurant, Frost Cafe, and Local Food dining options all offer alcoholic beverages for sale.

== See also ==
- Historic Hotels of America
