= Saint Anthony Hall (Hartford, Connecticut) =

American fraternity building)

- U.S. National Register of Historic Places
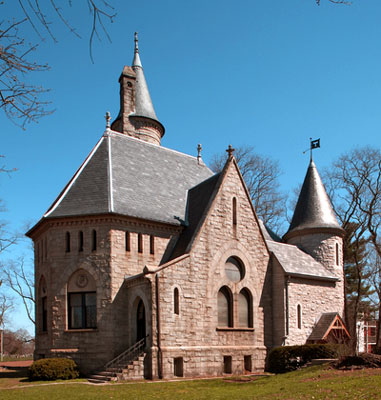
- Saint Anthony Hall with 2nd tower addition, 2005.

- Location within Connecticut Location within the United States
- Location: 340 Summit Street, Hartford, Connecticut, U.S.
- Coordinates: 41°45′6″N 72°41′35″W
- Area: less than one acre
- Built: 1878
- Architect: Josiah Cleveland Cady
- Architectural style: Gothic, High Victorian Gothic
- NRHP reference No.: 85001017
- Added to NRHP: May 9, 1985

The Saint Anthony Hall Trinity College chapter house is an historic fraternity building located at 340 Summit Street in Hartford, Connecticut. Built between 1877 and 1878, it is a significant early work of the American architect J. Cleaveland Cady. The building was listed on the National Register of Historic Places in November 1985.

== History ==
The Epsilon chapter of the Fraternity of Delta Psi (St. Anthony Hall) was chartered Thursday, October 17, 1850 at Trinity College. Its members have played significant roles throughout the college's history. The chapter house was built between 1877 and 1878 to a design by architect J. Cleaveland Cady, an 1860 Trinity College graduate and a Delta Psi member. The building was completed at a cost of $68,00—$40,000 of which was donated by Robert Habersham Coleman, an 1877 Trinity graduate and Delta Psi fraternity member, who become, albeit briefly, the wealthiest man in the United States. Other fraternity members donated as well toward construction and land acquisition, and the building was completed free of debt.

The Epsilon chapter house is the first building constructed in the United States for the sole purpose of being a college fraternity house.

== Architecture ==
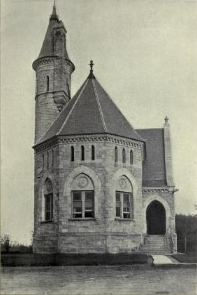
Saint Anthony Hall, 1906

Saint Anthony Hall is located on Gallows Hill, topographically the highest elevation Hartford, just north of the Trinity College campus, on the corner of Summit Avenue and Allen Place. It is a two–story High Victorian Gothic style building finished with a façade made of quarried New Hampshire granite laid in random courses. Externally, it appears to be rectangular structure with a rounded apse at one end and a steeply pitched hip roof. Prominent features include round towers, one tall and the other short, at two corners of the building, each topped by a conical roof with flared eave. On one long side a gabled section projects, with a pair of arched stained glass windows surmounted by a round window, also of stained glass.

Cady's design for the Epsilon chapter house was a departure from existing collegiate secret society buildings of the time, particularly the ones at Yale such as Skull and Bones (1856) and Scroll and Key (1870); its large windows, both front and back, as well as its prominent oak front doors with carved glyphs were seen as a welcoming feature, yet its imposing architecture did not fail to communicate a strong element of secretiveness that continued to mark the character of the organization.

Furthermore, it continues to serve strictly as a meeting hall with no dormitories or sleeping facilities, a characteristic of secret societies. Prominent features include an ample foyer at the entrance, an octagonal living room, a library which at the time of the house's construction served as the fraternity dining room, and recreational facilities in the basement, including a pool table room, a bar room, and a reception area. Today, it is the oldest St. Anthony Hall fraternity's house still in use.

== Renovation and addition ==
With the 2001 inspection failure of an external metal fire–escape that had been grandfathered in by the City of Hartford years before, alumni members led a campaign to bring the building's fire exit door into compliance through the addition of a smaller second tower on the left rear side of the building. A fundraising campaign was launched to complete the structure within a year. Careful measures had to be taken to harmonize this addition with the rest of the building, so a design was chosen that would blend harmoniously with the tower. The granite on the exterior of the addition came from the same New Hampshire quarry that provided the exterior for the original building. Precautions were taken to improve the entrance and exit into the basement area, as well as convert the old hatch door fire escape into a full size door. The new addition was inaugurated in 2003.

The chapter is currently suspended, running through June 2023.

== See also ==
- National Register of Historic Places listings in Hartford, Connecticut
- North American fraternity and sorority housing
