= Church of the Holy Communion (Norwood, New Jersey) =

Historic church in New Jersey, US

- U.S. National Register of Historic Places
- New Jersey Register of Historic Places
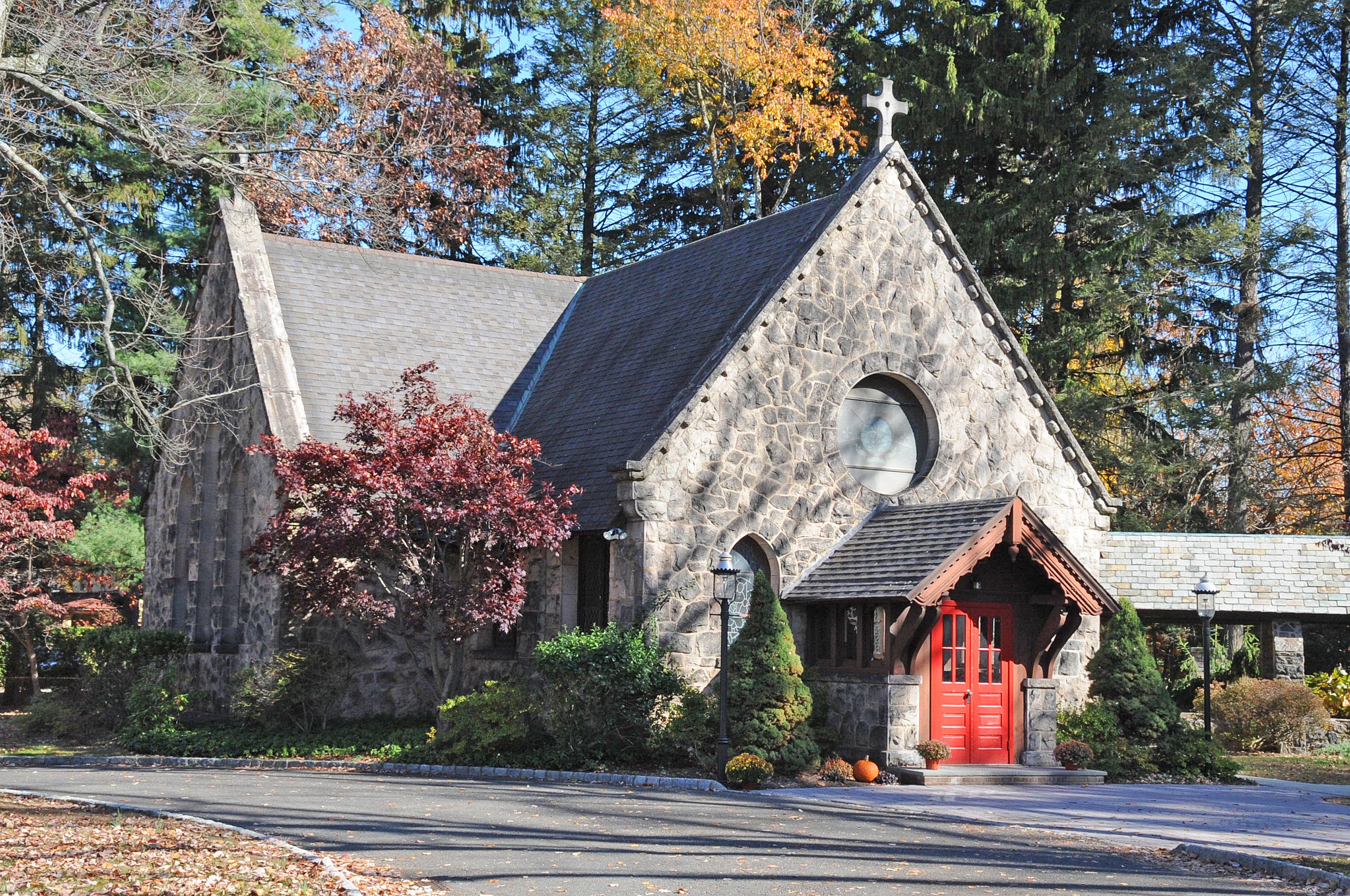

- Location within Bergen County, New Jersey Location within New Jersey Location within the United States
- Location: 66 Summit Street, Norwood, New Jersey
- Coordinates: 40°59′44″N 73°57′39″W
- Area: 1.7 acres (0.69 ha)
- Built: 1886
- Architects: J. Cleveland Cady; Tiffany Glass & Decorating Co.
- Architectural style: Gothic Revival, Shingle Style
- NRHP reference No.: 88000928
- NJRHP No.: 592

Significant dates
- Added to NRHP: June 23, 1988
- Designated NJRHP: May 1, 1988

The Church of the Holy Communion is a historic Episcopal church building on Summit Street in Norwood, Bergen County, New Jersey, United States. It is a parish of the Episcopal Diocese of Newark.

The church reported 94 members in 2016 and 28 members in 2023; no membership statistics were reported in 2024 parochial reports. Plate and pledge income reported for the congregation in 2024 was $14,143 with average Sunday attendance (ASA) of twelve persons.

It was designed by J. Cleaveland Cady in Late Gothic Revival style and Shingle Style and was built in 1886. The church was added to the National Register of Historic Places on June 23, 1988, for its significance in art and architecture.

== History ==
Episcopal services in Norwood began in the local Presbyterian Church about 1870. Norwood was a weekend and vacation resort for New Yorkers at the time, and the parish served these visitors throughout much of its history. Official consent to form a church parish was given on October 14, 1878, by Bishop William Henry Odenheimer of the Diocese of Newark.

Land for the church was donated Mr. and Mrs. George W Luckey. Construction began in 1876 and was completed in 1877. This building was destroyed by fire on November 6. 1886. Following the original plans, a new building, costing $8,229.69, was completed in 1888. A Carrara marble altar and a Tiffany window depicting the Resurrection were donated by the William H. Oakley family. An organ built by the J.H. & C.S. Odell Organ Builders was donated by the Suydam family.

A parish hall was built in 1930 and an education building in 1969. From 1980 to 1987 the church shared a rector and administrative services with nearby St. Andrew's Episcopal Church in Harrington Park.

== See also ==
- National Register of Historic Places listings in Bergen County, New Jersey
- Church of the Holy Communion and Buildings, a deconsecrated church in Manhattan, New York City
