= Upper Closter–Alpine Historic District =

Historic district in New Jersey, United States

- U.S. National Register of Historic Places
- U.S. Historic district
- New Jersey Register of Historic Places
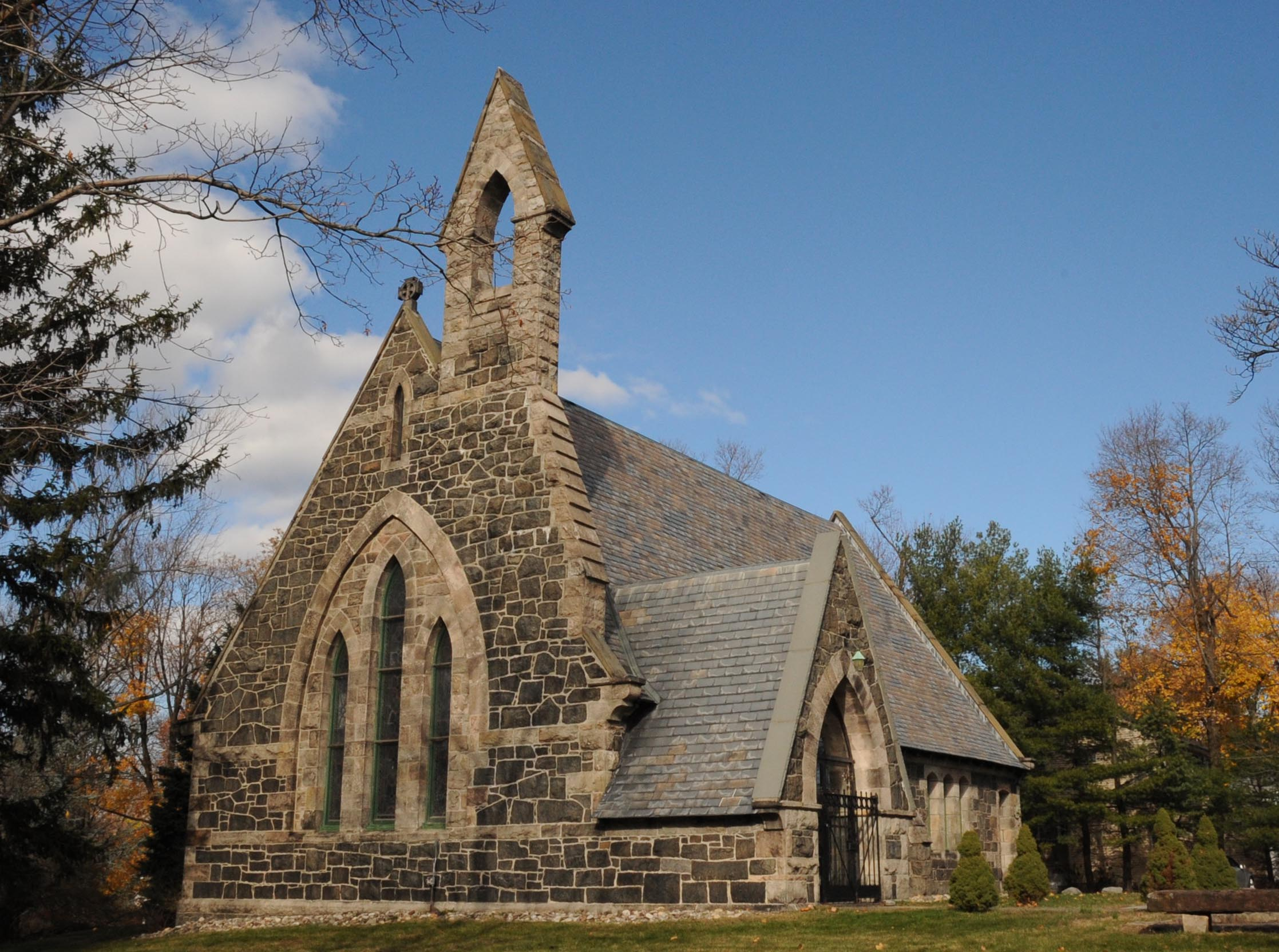

- Location within Bergen County, New Jersey Location within New Jersey Location within the United States
- Location: Roughly bounded by Forest Street, Old Dock Road, School House Lane, Church Street and Closter Dock Road, Alpine, New Jersey
- Coordinates: 40°56′57″N 73°55′37″W
- Area: 16.1 acres (6.5 ha)
- Architects: Cady, J. Cleveland
- Architectural style: Late Victorian, Vernacular Downingesque
- NRHP reference No.: 85001013
- NJRHP No.: 430

Significant dates
- Added to NRHP: May 8, 1985
- Designated NJRHP: March 18, 1985

Upper Closter–Alpine Historic District is located in Alpine, Bergen County, New Jersey, United States. The district was added to the National Register of Historic Places on May 8, 1985.
