= St. William's Catholic Church (Long Lake, New York) =

Historic church in New York, United States

- U.S. National Register of Historic Places
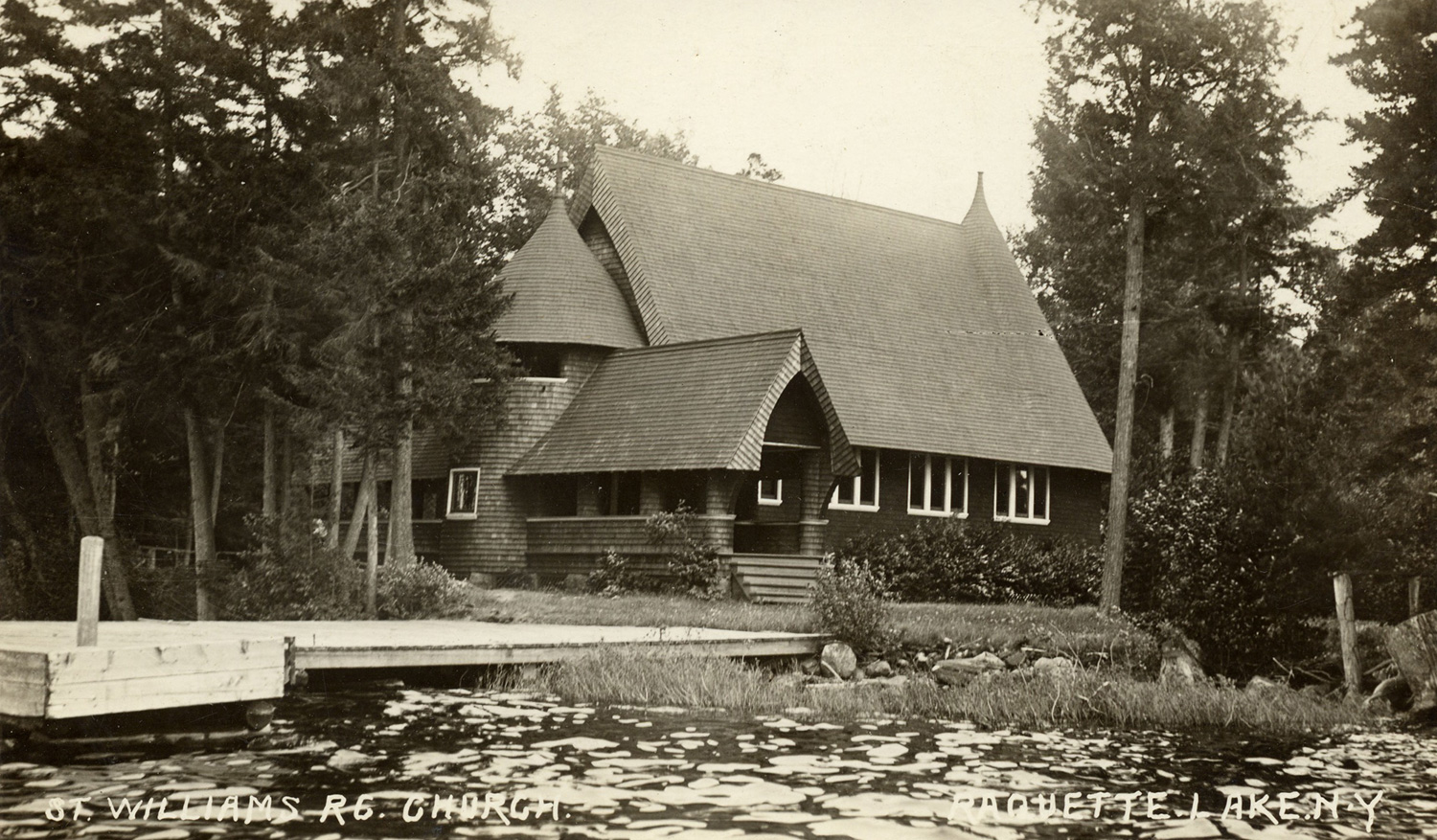
- St. William's Catholic Church, ca. 1905

- Location within New York Location within the United States
- Location: Long Point on Raquette Lake, Raquette Lake, New York
- Coordinates: 43°49′33″N 74°37′55″W
- Area: less than one acre
- Built: 1890
- Architect: J.C. Cady & Co.; Hammond & Mosher
- Architectural style: Shingle Style
- NRHP reference No.: 04001446
- Added to NRHP: January 7, 2005

St. William's Catholic Church is a historic Roman Catholic church on Long Point on Raquette Lake in Raquette Lake, Hamilton County, New York. The building and grounds are no longer part of the Catholic Church/Ogdensburg diocese but are maintained by a nonprofit organization.

== Description ==
St. William's was designed by prominent New York architect J. Cleaveland Cady's firm at the height of Shingle Style architecture fashion. It was built by William West Durant in 1890 and is a rectangular, one-story church with a steeply pitched roof. The main facade features a two-story cylindrical tower capped by a conical roof and flanked by a pair of open porches.

The building and its property is maintained by Saint William’s on Long Point Inc. a non-profit, non-denominational organization, dedicated to preserving the historic church. The group has created a quiet retreat through the rental of housekeeping facilities and providing community events for the surrounding area during the summer months. The property is seasonally available and accessible by boat only.

The organization was started in 1993. Throughout the past 26 years, they have accomplished a significant amount of restoration and renovations to the historic church, including, but not limited to, stabilizing the foundation and floor in the church, replacing and staining the exterior cedars, replacing and painting the interior plaster, new lighting, and refinished wood floors. All renovations and preservation have been carefully done within strict guidelines honoring the long history of Saint William’s.

This organization is not affiliated with or under the jurisdiction of the Roman Catholic Diocese of Ogdensburg or the Conventual Franciscan Friars.

It was added to the National Register of Historic Places in 2005.

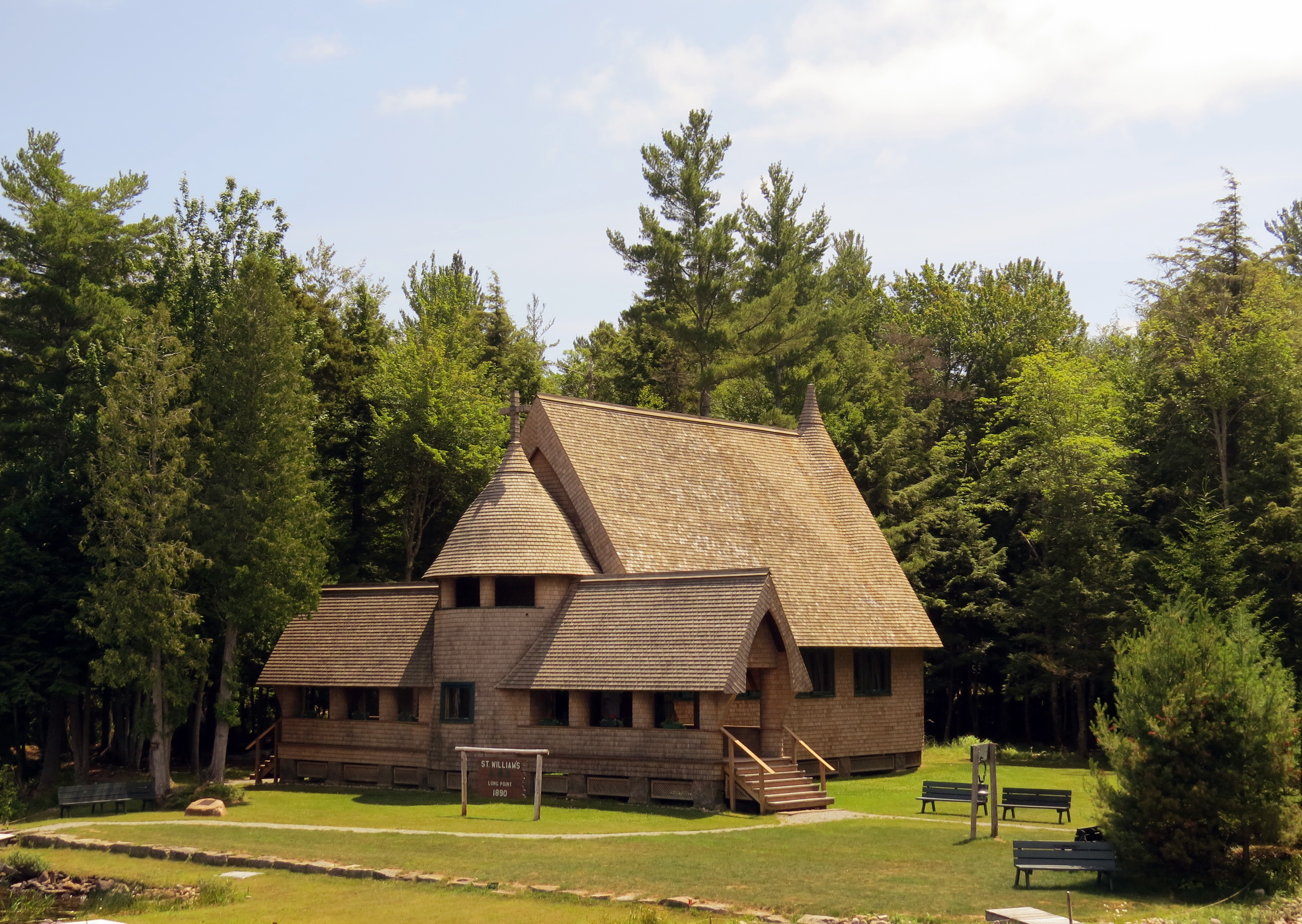
Historic St. Williams Catholic Church on Long Point, Raquette Lake, New York

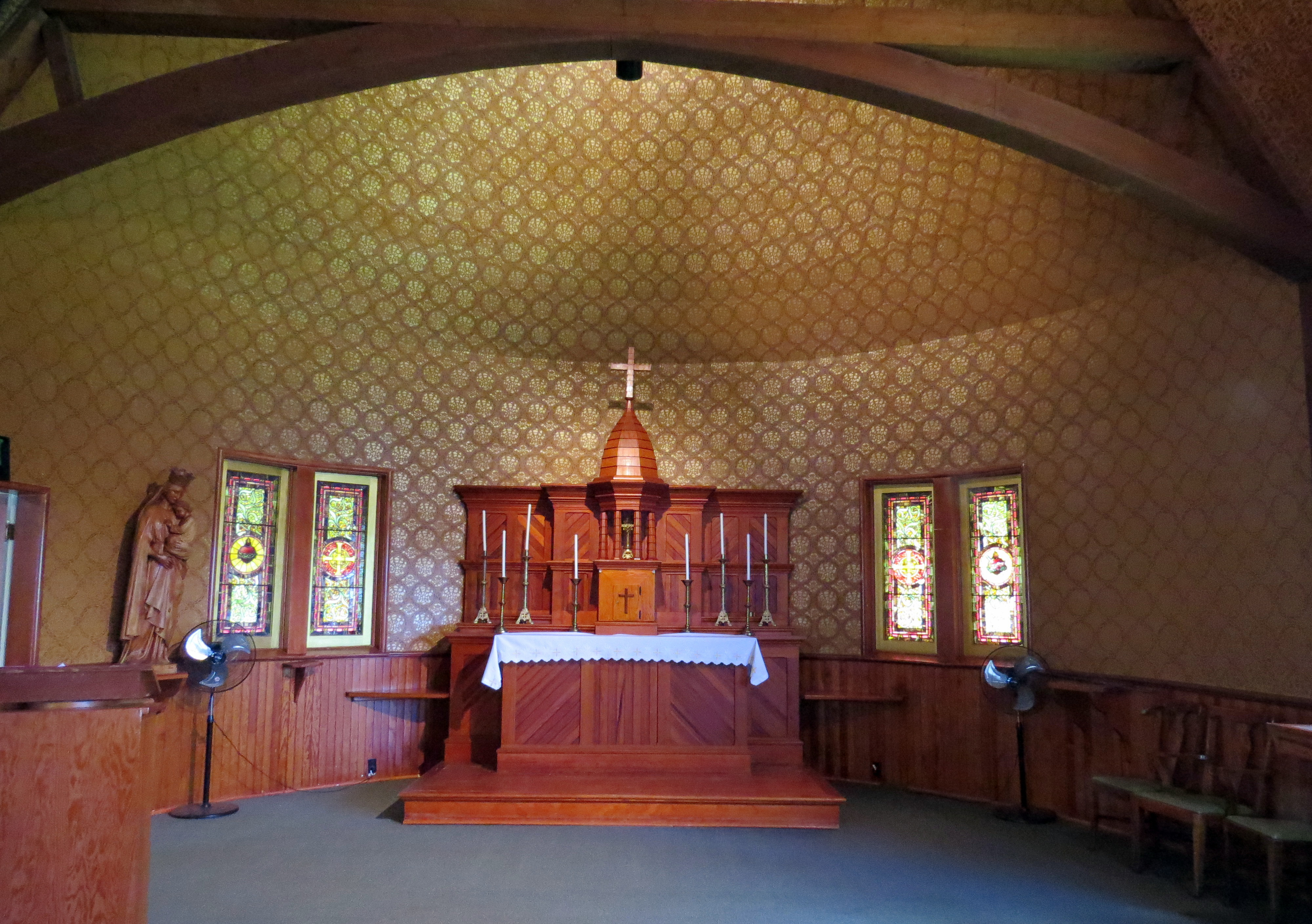
The altar of St. William's Catholic Church on Long Point, Raquette Lake, New York

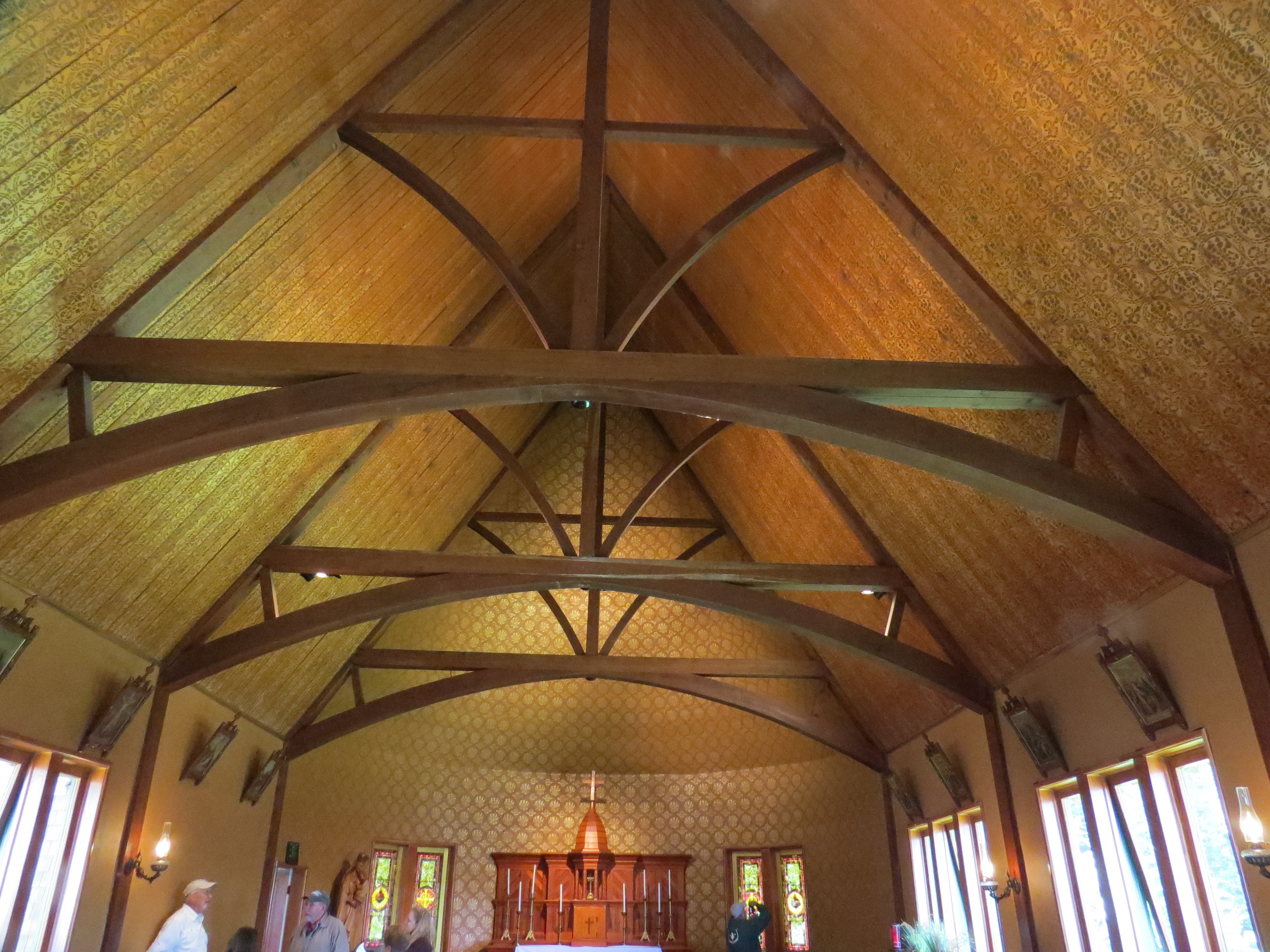
The ceiling of St. Williams Catholic Church on Long Point. The entire ceiling has been hand-stencilled.
