= Eagle Lake (Hamilton County, New York) =

Lake

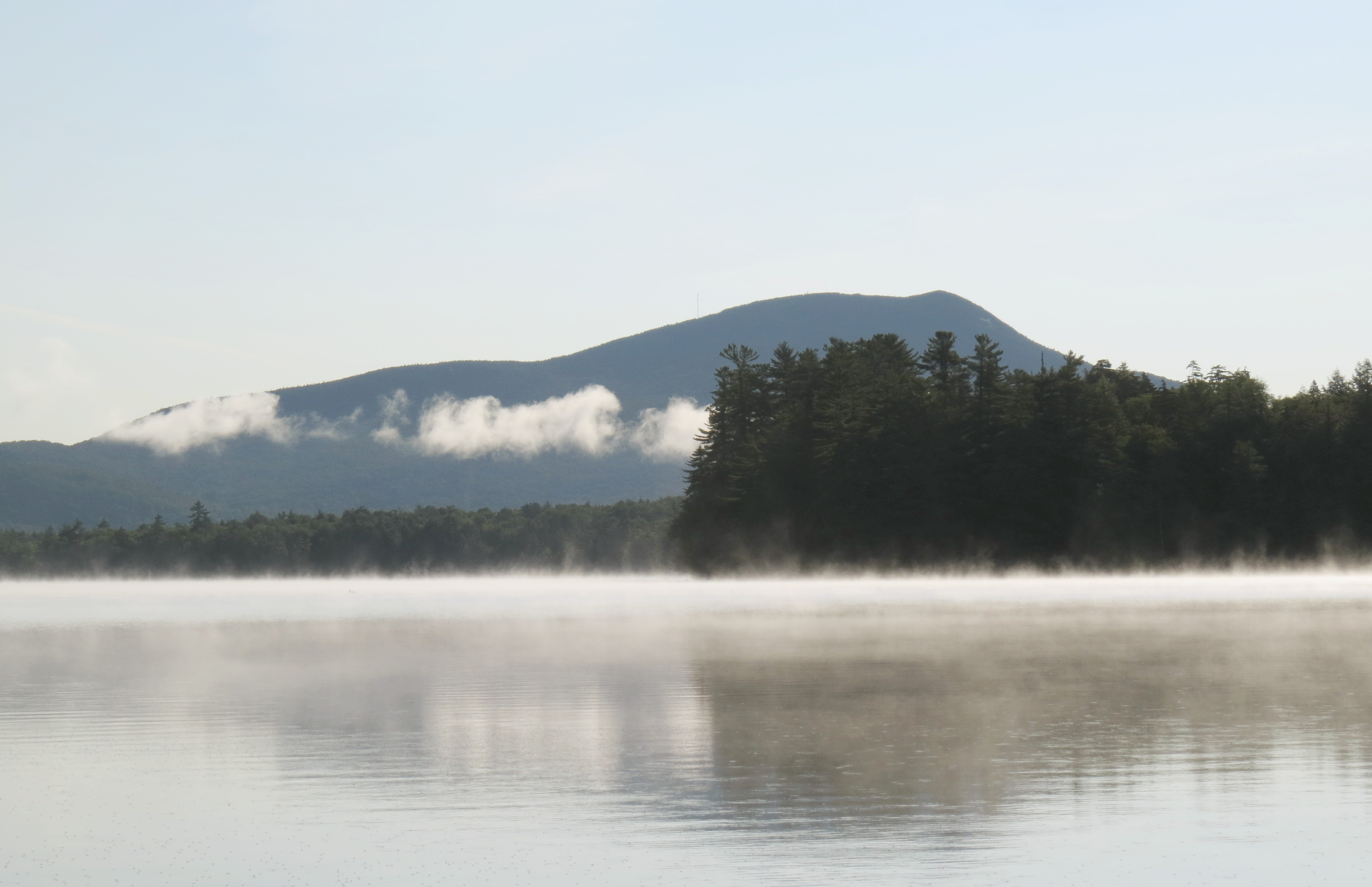
- Looking east on Eagle Lake toward Blue Mountain

- Location within New York Eagle Lake (the United States)
- Location: Hamilton County, New York
- Coordinates: 43°50′49″N 74°28′46″W
- Type: Lake
- Primary inflows: Marion River
- Primary outflows: Marion River
- Basin countries: United States
- Surface area: 180 acres (0.73 km^{2})
- Max. depth: 31 feet (9.4 m)
- Shore length^{1}: 2.8 miles (4.5 km)
- Surface elevation: 1,791 feet (546 m)
- Settlements: Eagles Nest, New York
- ^{1} Shore length is not a well-defined measure.

Eagle Lake is a 180-acre lake in the Adirondacks of New York. Eagle Lake is part of the Eckford Chain, and is the central lake of the chain, with Blue Mountain Lake and Utowana Lake. It is the site of Eagle Nest camp, a historic Adirondack Great Camp built in 1937.

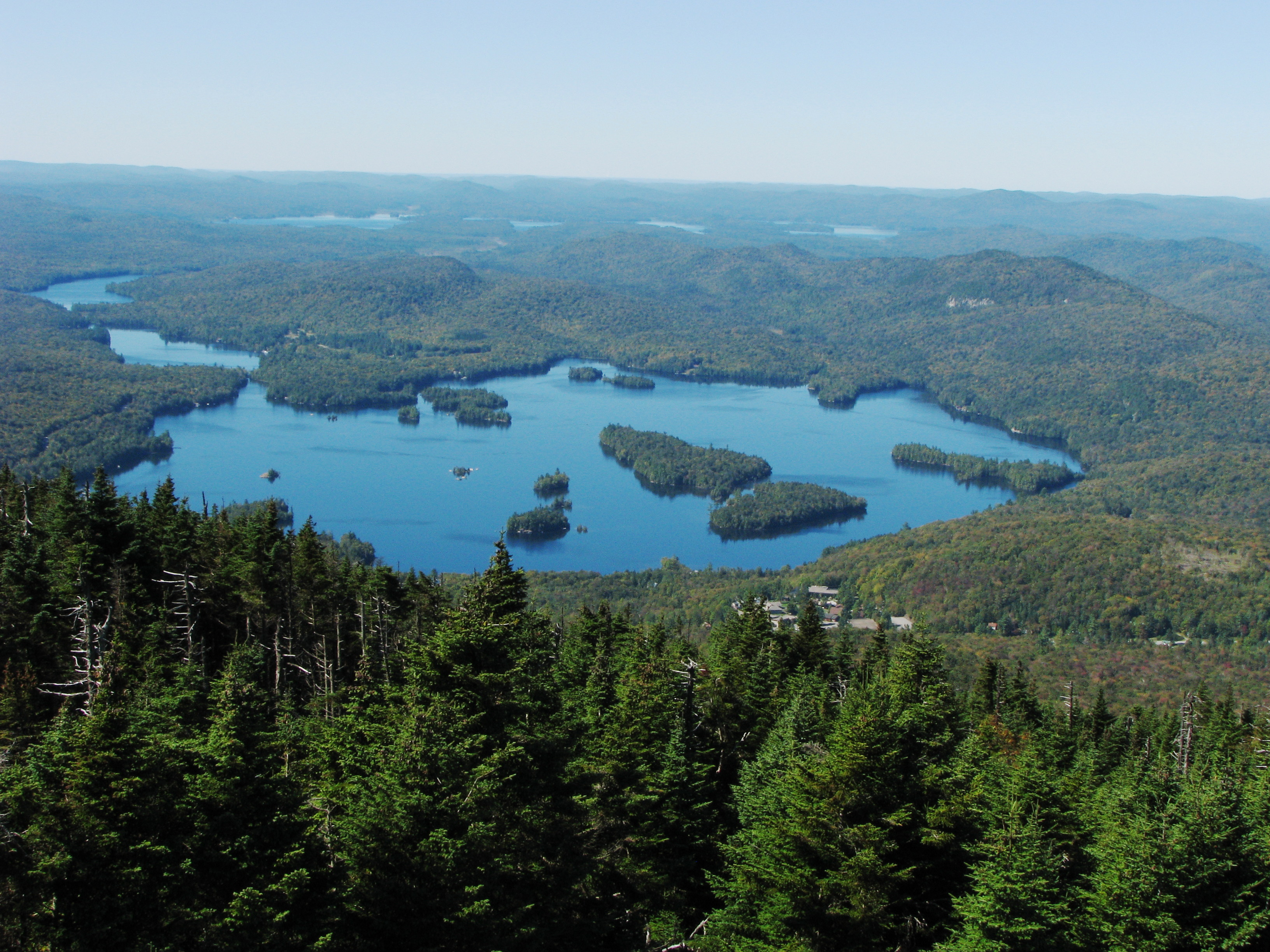
View of Eagle Lake at the outlet of the larger Blue Mountain Lake.

== Fishing ==
Fish species present in Eagle Lake are lake trout, white sucker, sunfish, black bullhead, atlantic salmon, yellow perch, and smallmouth bass. Access by channel from Utowana Lake or Blue Mountain Lake.
