= Adirondack Experience =

Museum in New York, United States

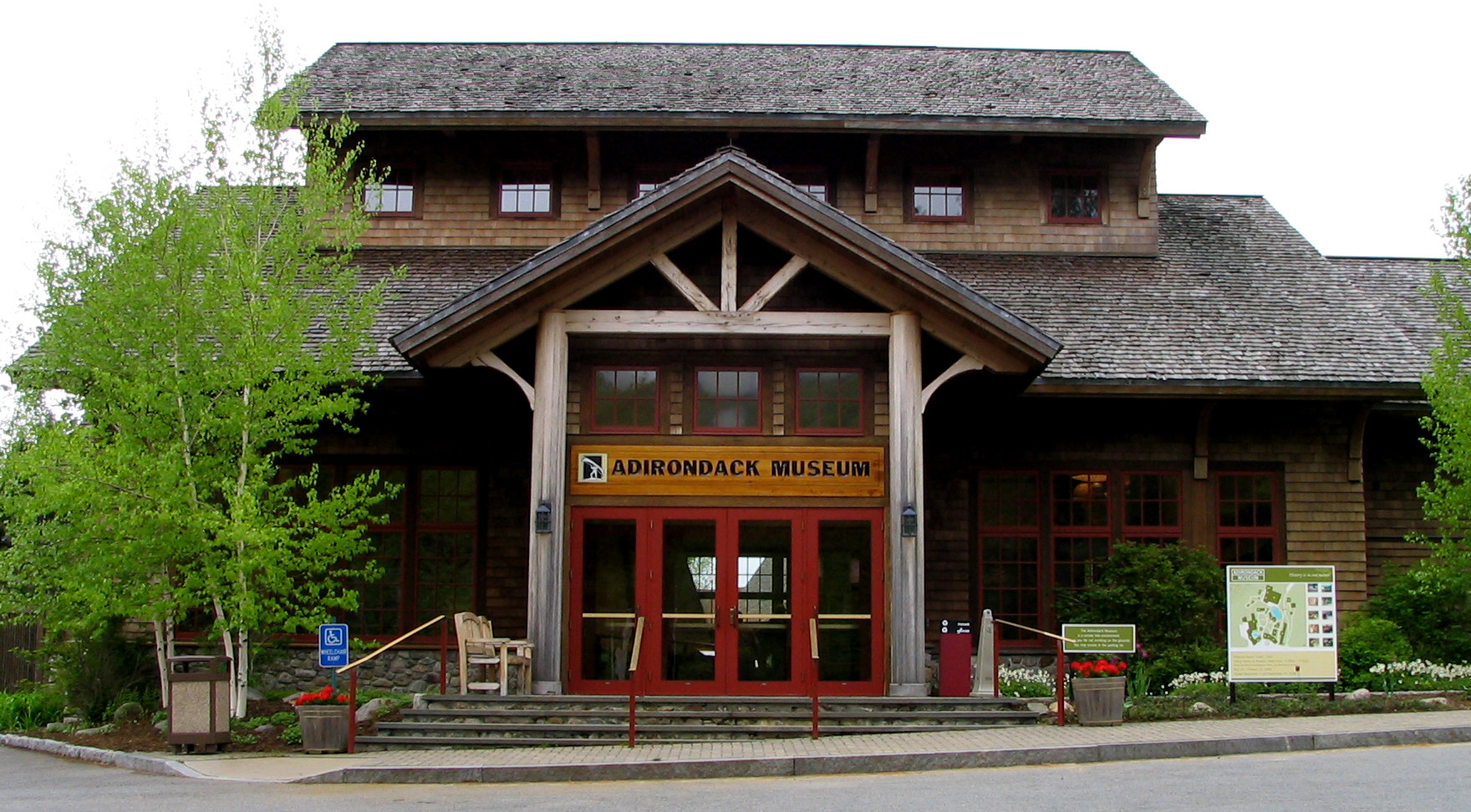
- Main entrance of the Adirondack Experience
- Location: Blue Mountain Lake, New York
- Coordinates: 43.86963674080865°N 74.43168644848335°W
- Website: www.theadkx.org

Adirondack Experience (formerly Adirondack Museum), located on NY-30 in the hamlet of Blue Mountain Lake in Hamilton County, New York, is a museum dedicated to preserving the history of the Adirondacks. The museum is located on the site of an historic summer resort hotel, the Blue Mountain House, built high above Blue Mountain Lake in 1876 by Miles Tyler Merwin, that operated until the late 1940s. The museum consists of 23 buildings, 121 acres, and 60,000 square feet of exhibition space. The opening of a brand new 19,000 square foot exhibition, Life in the Adirondacks, took place July 2017.

Adirondack Experience is open late-May to mid-October.

The museum's collections include historic artifacts, photographs, indigenous arts, archival materials, and fine art documenting the region's past in twenty-four buildings including historic structures and contemporary galleries. The museum offers special events, traditional workshops, demonstrations by artisans-in-residence, and school field trips (free for schools in the Adirondack Park). The museum contains a research library which is accessible year-round; its publication program has produced 65 books of Adirondack history, art histories, and museum catalogs.

== History ==
The museum was created in 1948 by Harold K. Hochschild as an effort to protect the steam locomotive and two cars that had been abandoned on the Marion River Carry between Utowana and Raquette Lakes. Within a year, the Adirondack Historical Association was formed. In 1953 the historic Blue Mountain House was purchased as the site for the museum, and after years of demolition and construction, gathering historic materials and designing exhibits, the museum opened on August 3, 1957. In 1963-64 the museum sponsored the archaeological exploration of the Wiawaka Bateaux Site by Terry Crandall. In 2017, the name changed from The Adirondack Museum to Adirondack Experience, The Museum on Blue Mountain Lake to better represent what the current institution is.

== Collections ==
The museum collection includes a number of large objects, including a Pullman railroad car, several guide boats and an Idem class racing sailboat, a steam locomotive, a one-room schoolhouse, the rustic "Sunset Cottage", the complete cabin of author and ecologist Anne LaBastille, and the Log Hotel, built in 1876 and original to the museum's site, which is on the National Register of Historic Places.

Other material includes:

- A fine art collection that contains over 2500 works including oil and watercolor paintings, prints, and artists' sketchbooks.
- The largest collection of historic inland wooden watercraft in the United States.
- More than 70,000 historic photographs including the work of Seneca Ray Stoddard, Alfred Stieglitz, and Eliot Porter.
- The largest public collection of rustic furniture in North America. The museum owns many pieces created by Joe Bryere, a local woodworking artist.
- The Museum's library claims the most comprehensive repository of books, periodicals, manuscripts, maps and government documents related to the Adirondack region.

On July 1, 2023, a permanent exhibition called Artists & Inspiration in the Wild opened inside the former Lynn Boillot Art Galleries. The museum received a $500,000 grant from the National Endowment for the Humanities in 2022 to help support the construction of the exhibit.

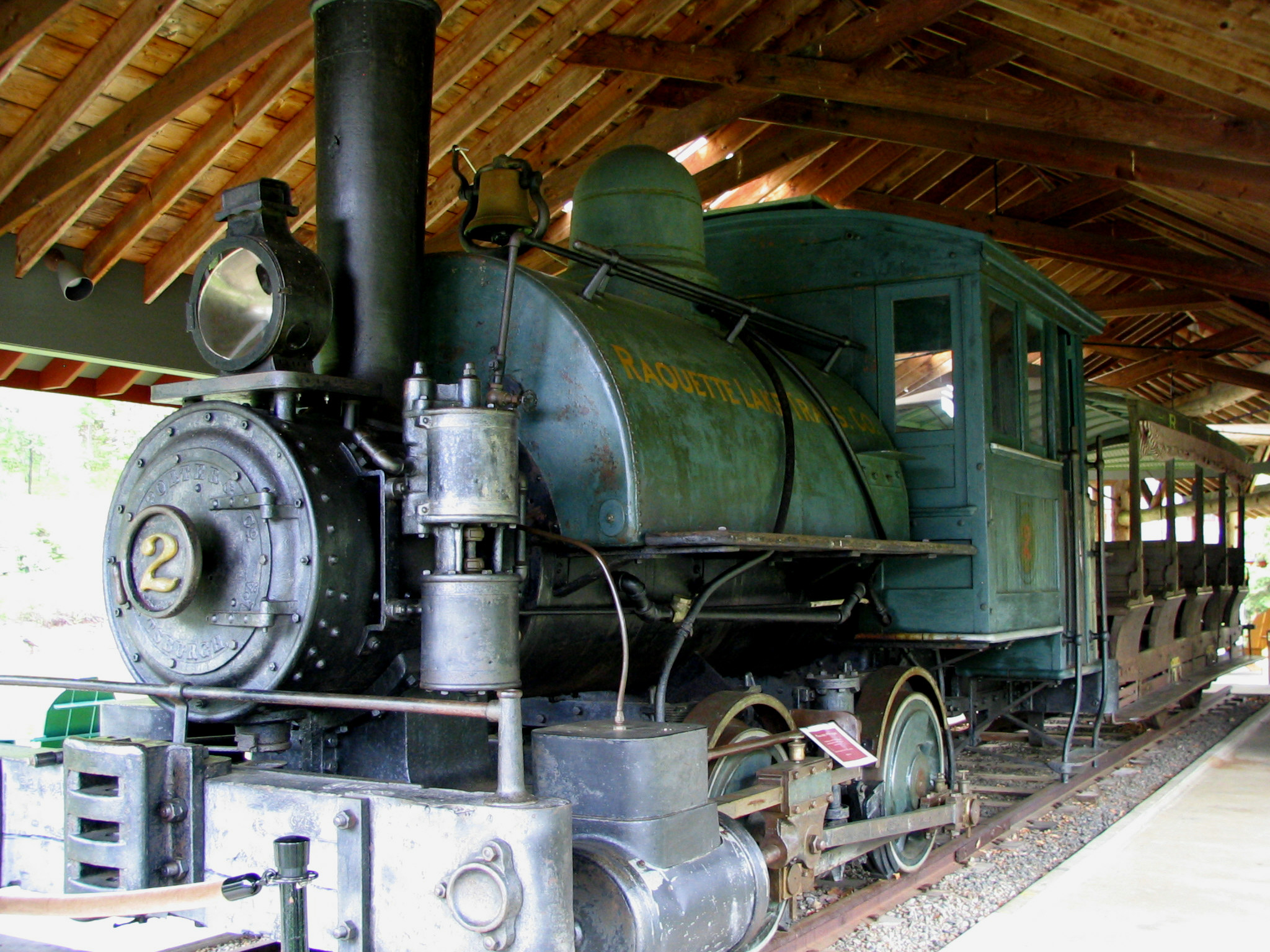
The engine that started the museum: The Marion River Carry Railroad, at 1,320 yards (1,210 m), the shortest standard-gauge railroad line in the US

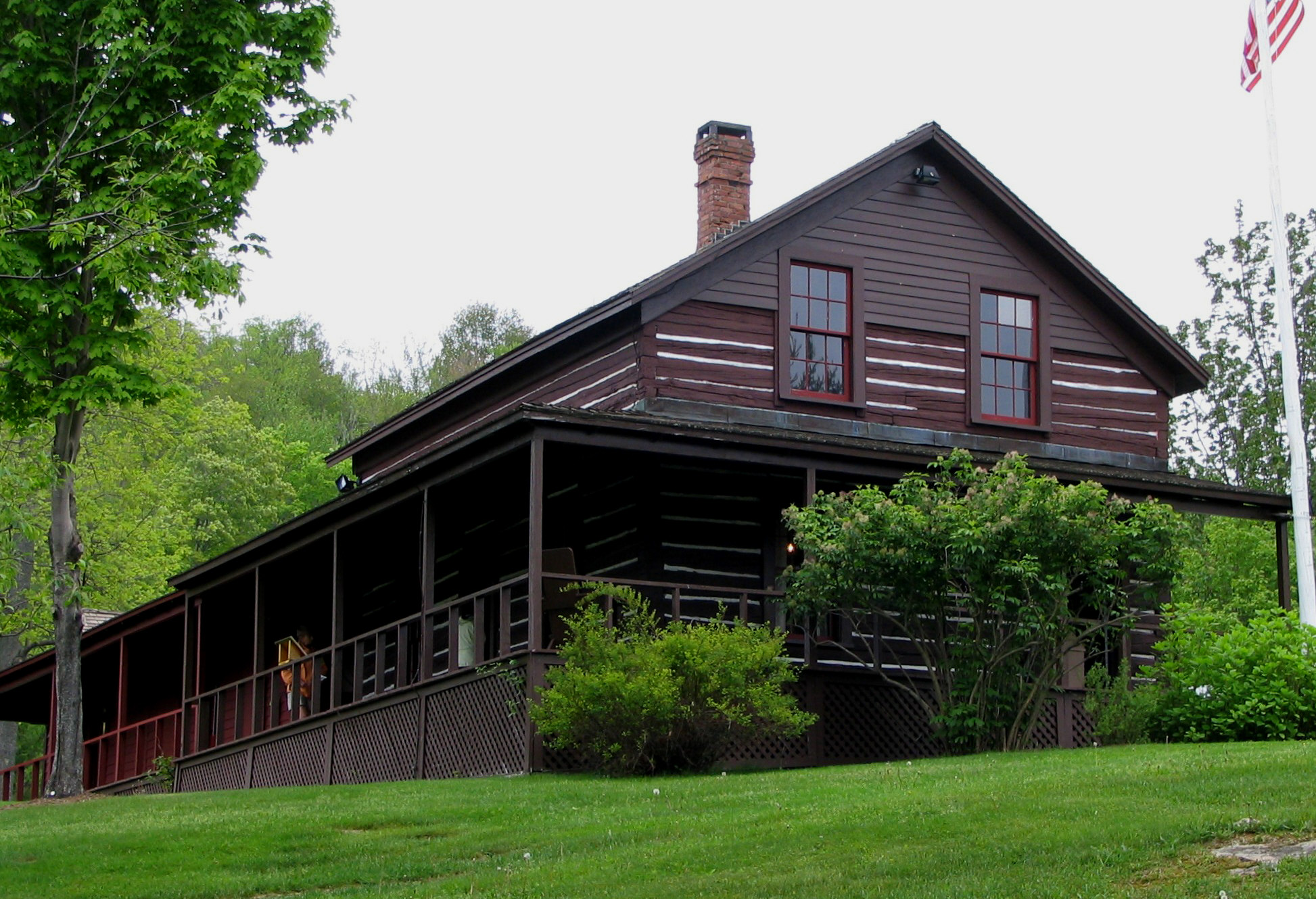
The Log Hotel, listed on the National Register of Historic Places

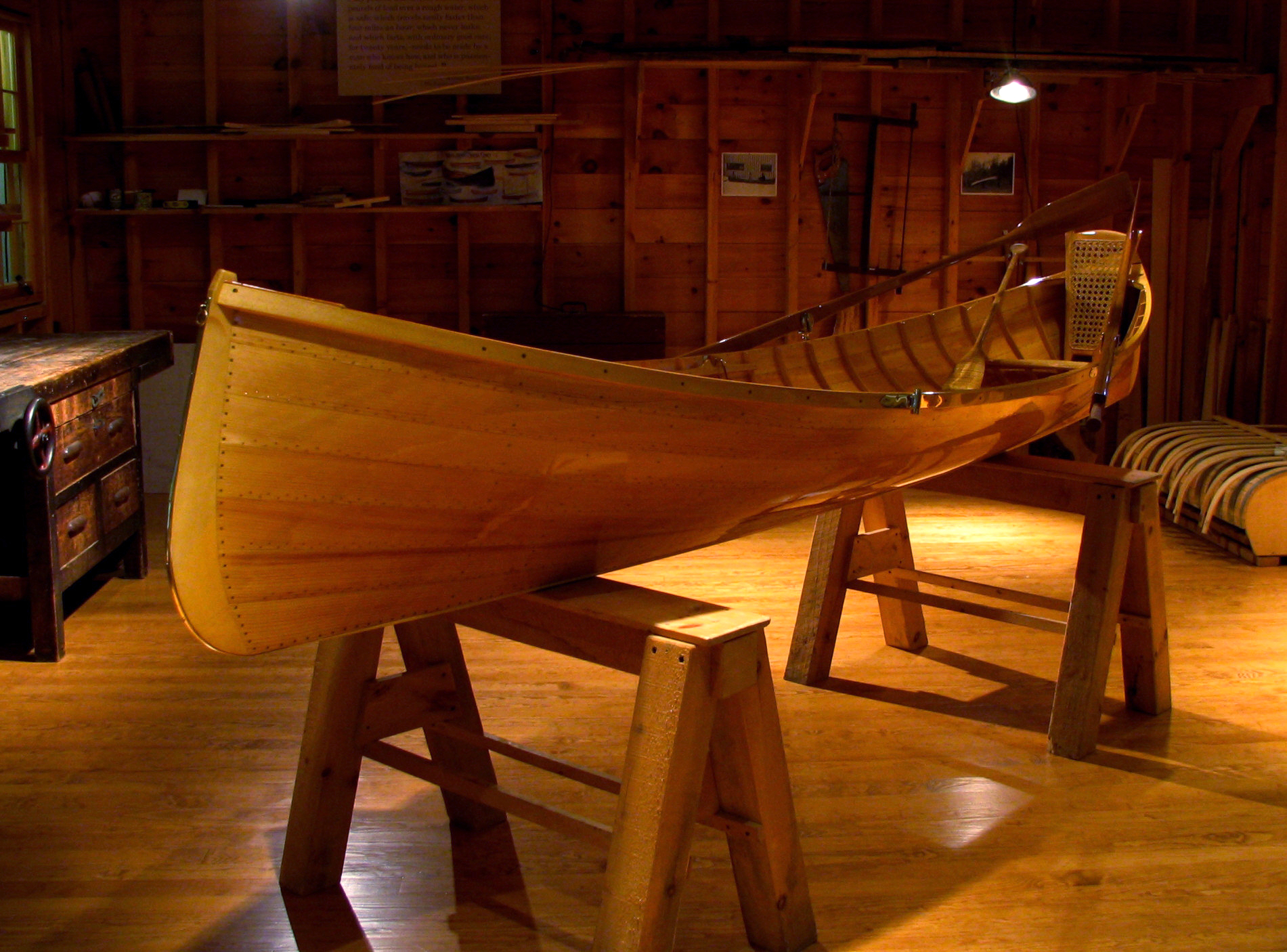
This Guide boat was built on-site as a demonstration

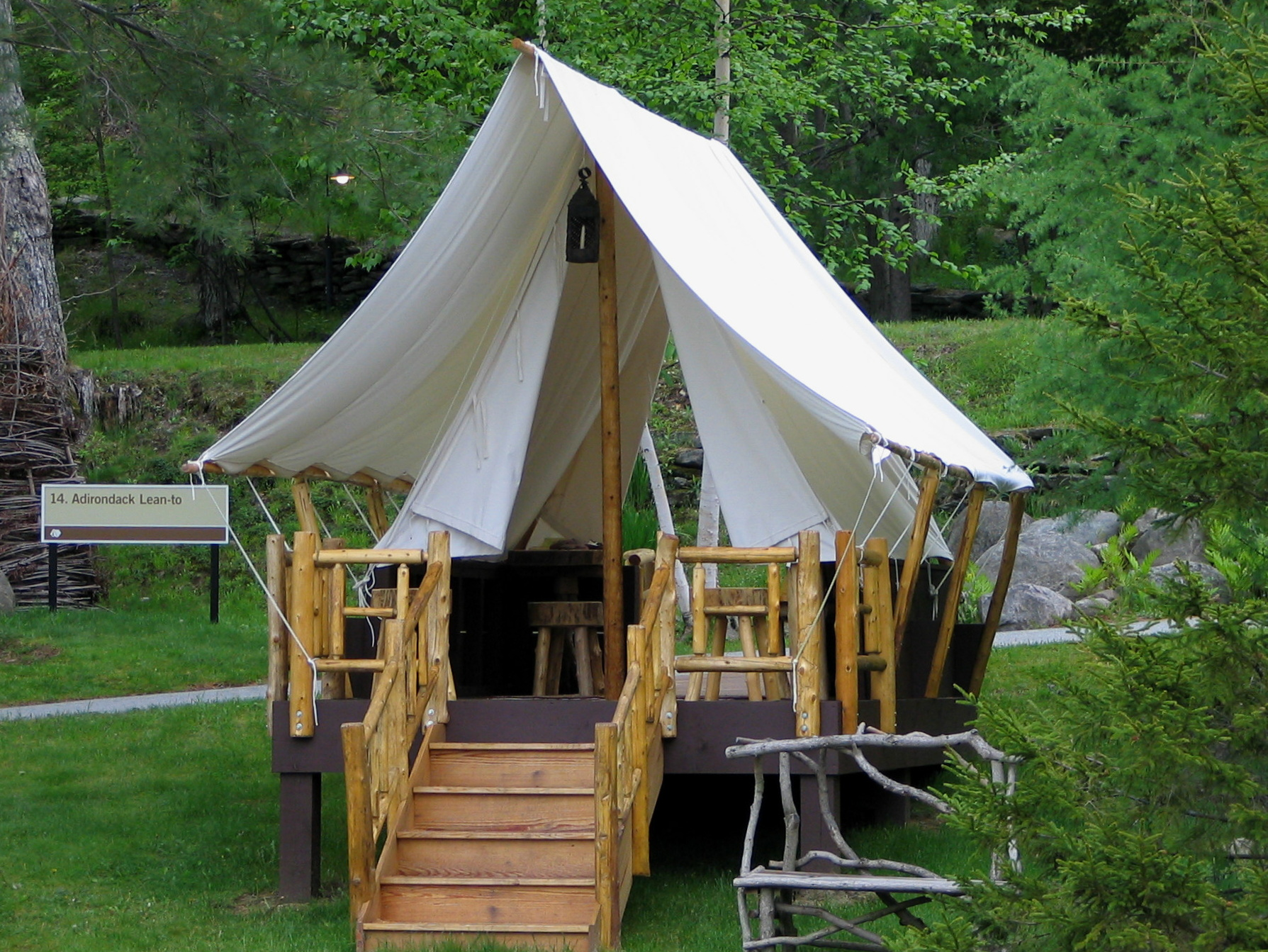
Platform Tent

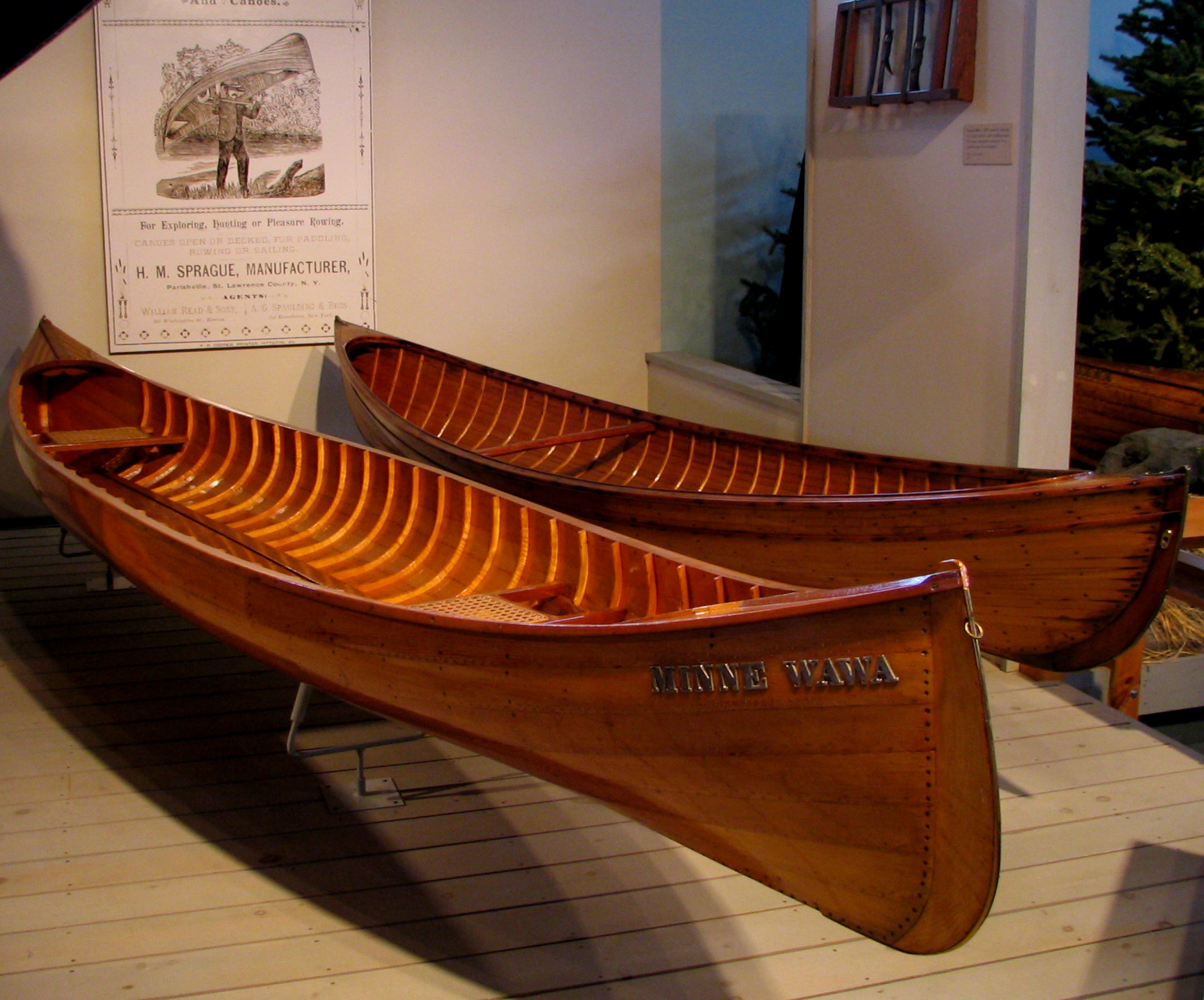
Antique Strip-built Canoes

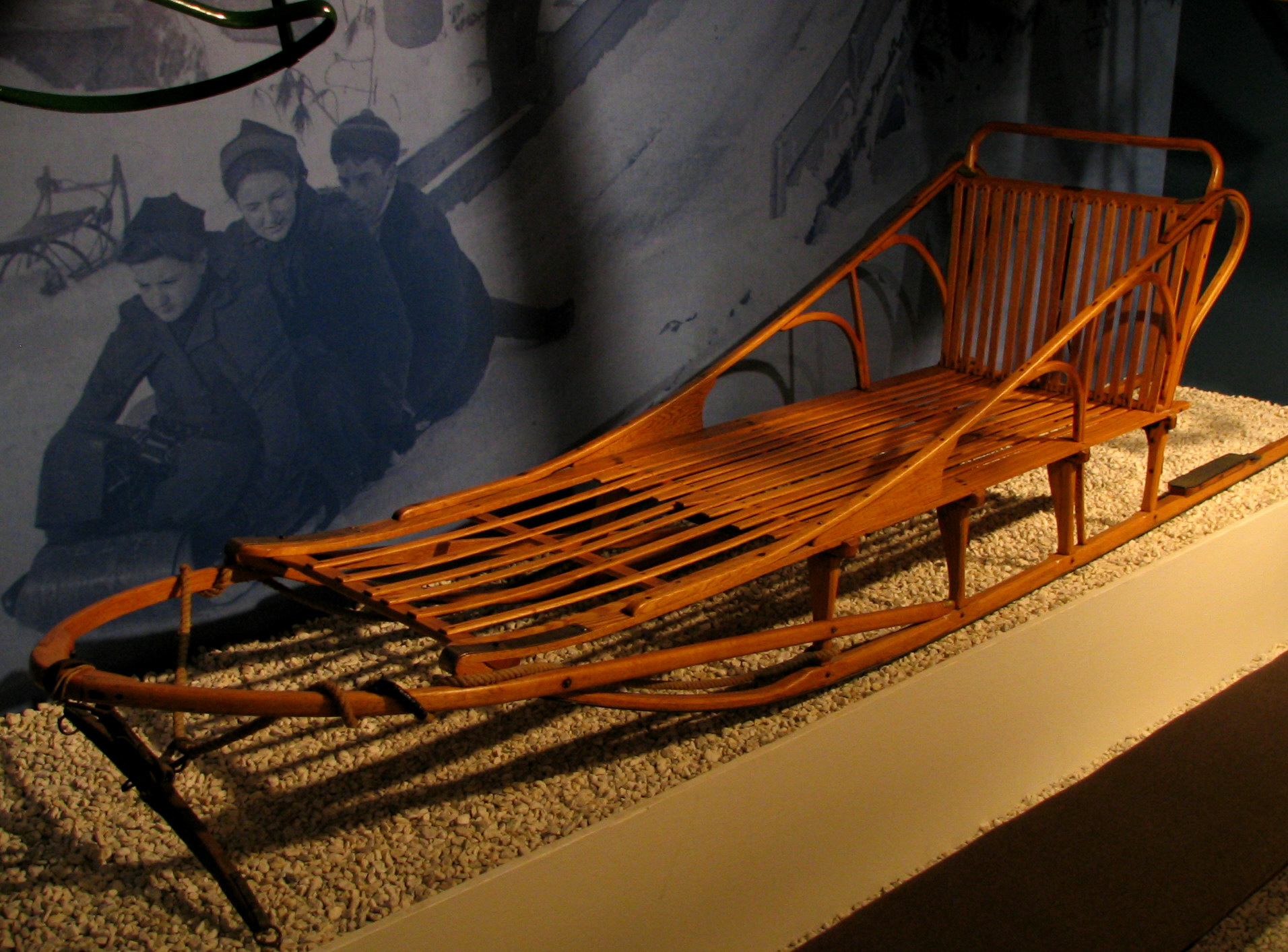
Dog Sled

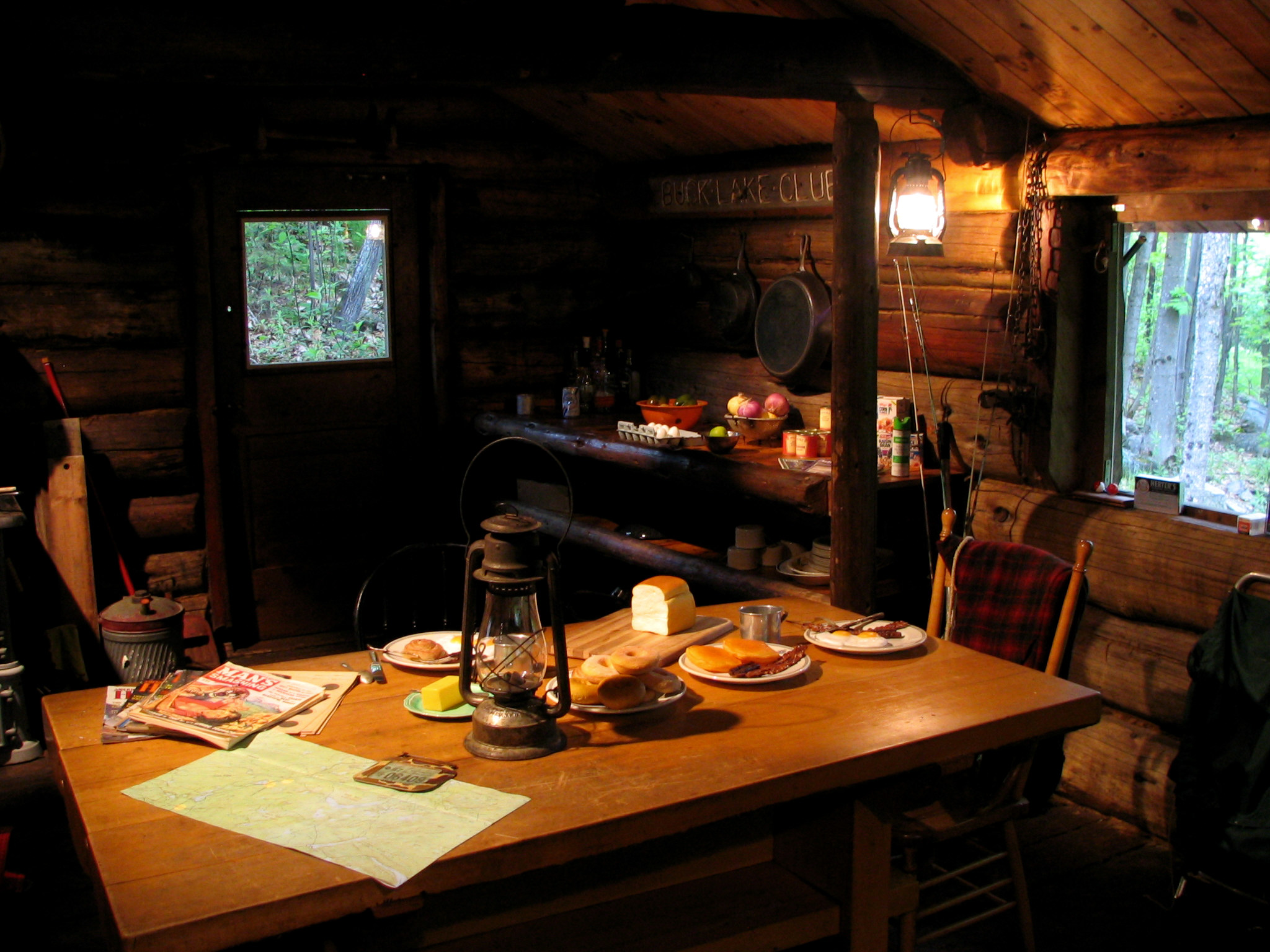
Buck Lake Club, one of several buildings moved on site

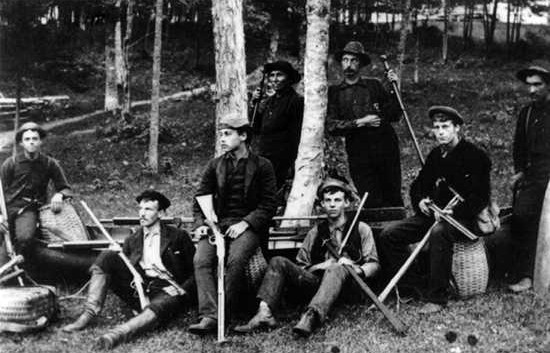
Adirondack Guides, one of thousands of photographs in the museum's collection

== See also ==
- Adirondack guideboat
- Adirondack Mountains
- Great Camps
- Reynoldston, New York
- The Wild Center

== Sources ==
- Gilborn, Craig A. and Alice W., Museum of the Adirondacks, The Adirondack Museum, 1993 ISBN 978-0-910020-36-7
