= Eckford =

Eckford may refer to:

== People ==
- Elizabeth Eckford (born 1941), one of the Little Rock Nine group of African-American students
- Henry Eckford (horticulturist) (1823–1905), British plant breeder
- Henry Eckford (shipbuilder) (1775–1832), Scottish-born American naval architect and shipbuilder
- Joseph Eckford (1814–1884), Australian politician
- James Eckford Lauder (1811–1869), Scottish artist
- Maggie Eckford (born c. 1986), American singer-songwriter better known by her stage name Ruelle (singer)
- Tyler Eckford (born 1985), Canadian professional ice hockey player

== Places ==
- Eckford, Scottish Borders, a village in Roxburghshire, Scotland
- The Eckford chain of lakes in the Adirondack Mountains in the United States
- Eckford Township, Michigan, a civil township in Calhoun County, Michigan, in the United States

== Ships ==
- PS Henry Eckford, an American commercial steamship in service from 1824 to 1841, the first steamship with a compound engine
- USNS Henry Eckford (T-AO-192), a United States Navy fleet replenishment oiler launched in 1989 and scrapped while still incomplete in 2011

== Sports ==
- Eckford of Brooklyn, an American baseball club in Brooklyn, New York, that played from 1855 to 1872
