= Eagle Nest camp =

Adirondack Great Camp in New York

Eagle Nest is an Adirondack Great Camp built in 1938 for Kathrine and Walter Hochschild on the north shore of Eagle Lake, New York

== History ==
The extensive grounds, surrounding both Eagle Lake and Utowana Lake, belonged to adventure writer Ned Buntline in 1867 and a 2000-acre parcel owned by William West Durant in 1888, before being purchased by mining magnate Berthold Hochschild in 1904. Much of the property is still owned by the Hochschild family; most of the rest of the original property is under conservation easements. The camp was designed by Saranac Lake architect William G. Distin based on ideas collected by Walter's wife Kay.

The camp compound consist of three buildings: the main house, guest house and boat house. The buildings are of frame construction, with exterior sheathing of split logs; exterior logs are of British Columbia cedar, while those on the interior of the main rooms of the main house are of peeled spruce felled on the property. The interior walls of the bedrooms and hallways are of pecky cypress.
