= Wiawaka bateaux =

Cluster of shipwrecks in Lake George, New York State

Coordinates: 43.426°N 73.698°W

- Wiawaka Bateaux Site
- U.S. National Register of Historic Places
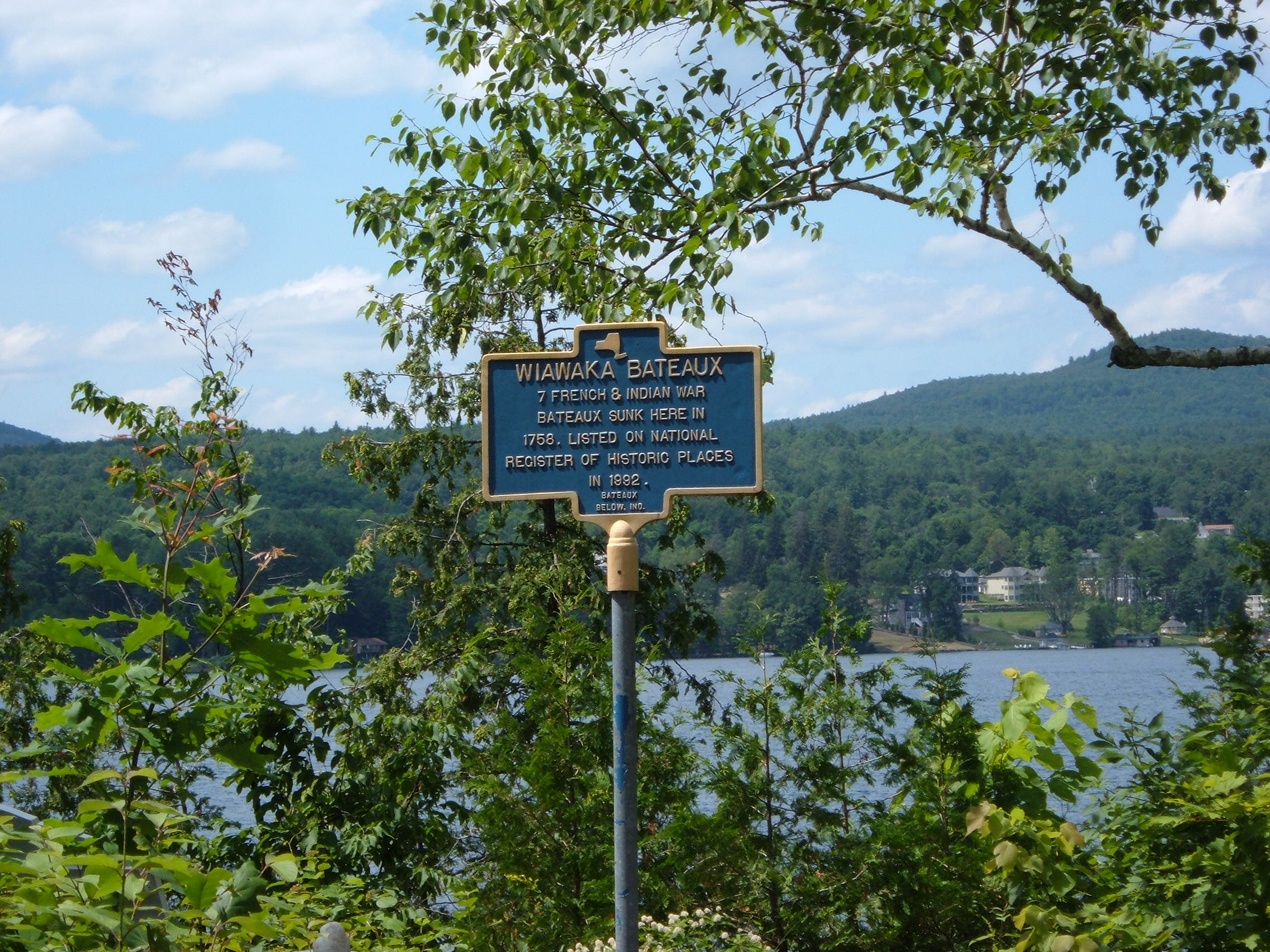
- Historic marker, July 2006

- Location within New York Location within the United States
- Nearest city: Lake George, New York
- Area: 1.3 acres (0.53 ha)
- Built: 1758
- Architectural style: 18th-century bateaux
- NRHP reference No.: 92000624
- Added to NRHP: June 14, 1992

The Wiawaka bateaux are a cluster of shipwrecks in Lake George, New York State. The seven British and colonial bateaux were scuttled in 1758 during the French and Indian Wars, with the intention of recovery in 1759. This never happened, and their wrecks were discovered between 1963 and 1964 by archaeological diver Terry Crandall, working under the auspices of the Adirondack Museum. The site was listed on the National Register of Historic Places in 1992.
