= Marion River =

- Location of the mouth of the Marion River Marion River (the United States)

Location
- Country: United States
- State: New York
- County: Hamilton

Physical characteristics
- Source: Blue Mountain Lake
  - location: Blue Mountain Lake (hamlet)
  - coordinates: 43°51′40″N 74°27′29″W
  - elevation: 1,790 ft (550 m)
- Mouth: Raquette Lake
  - location: Raquette Lake (hamlet)
  - coordinates: 43°49′51″N 74°36′47″W
  - elevation: 1,763 ft (537 m)
- Length: 4.5 mi (7.2 km)
- Basin size: 33.4 sq mi (87 km^{2})

Basin features
- Tributaries
  - left: Bear Brook

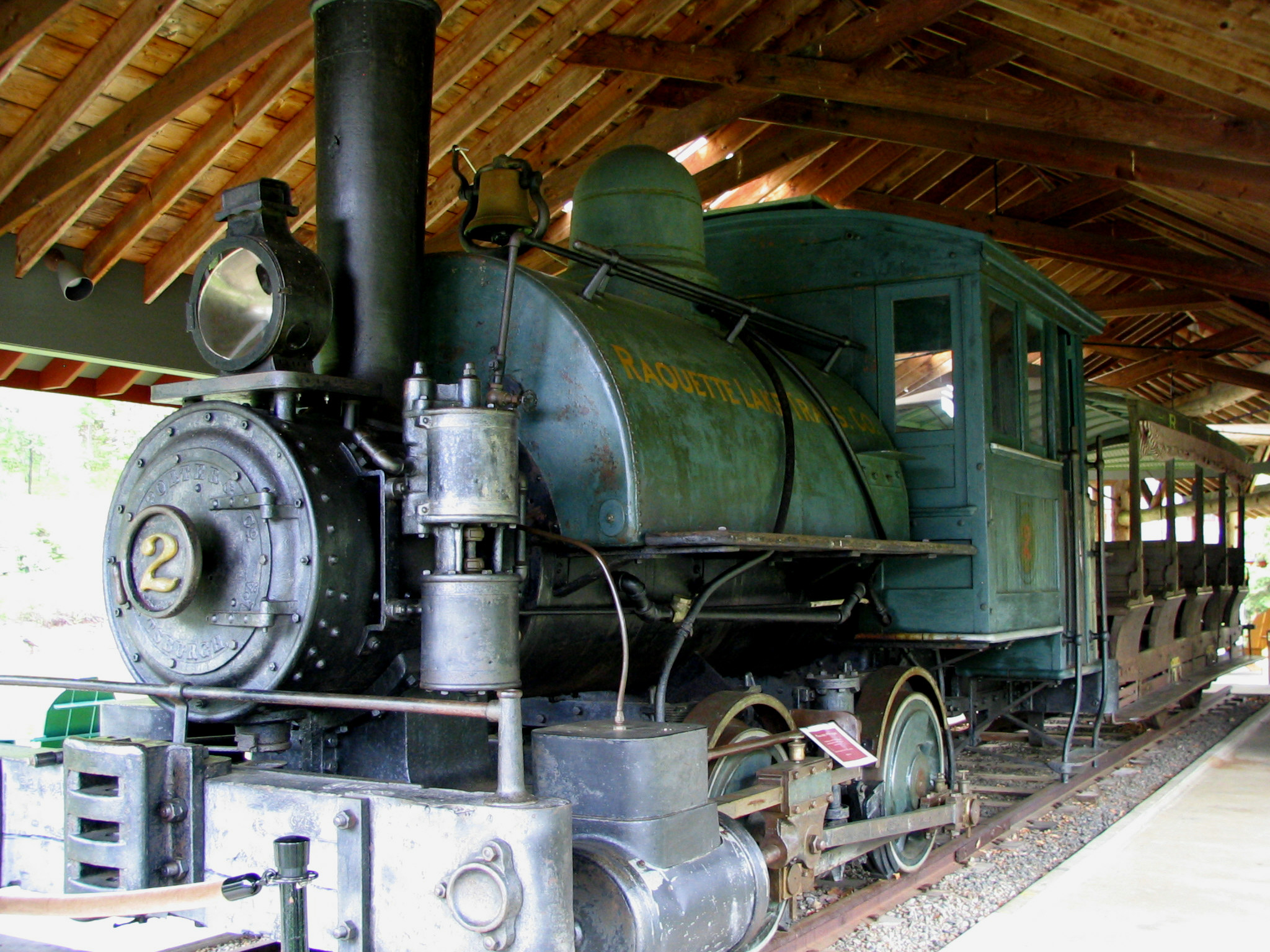
This engine was used on the Marion River Carry Railroad. Efforts to save the engine resulted in the Adirondack Museum

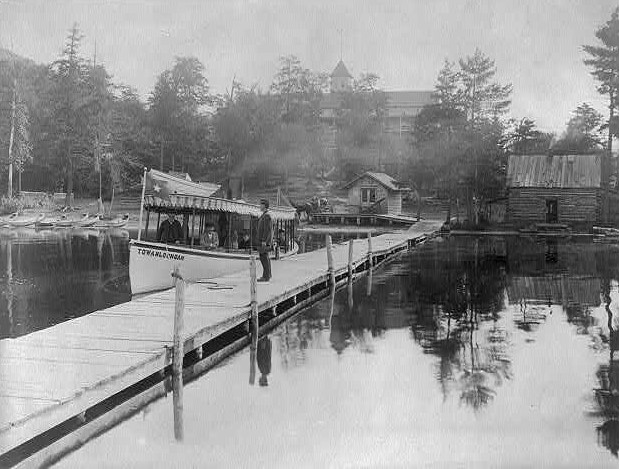
The Towahloondah on Blue Mountain Lake in 1899

The Marion River is a 4.5-mile (7.2 km) river that connects Blue Mountain Lake via Utowana Lake and Eagle Lake (the Eckford chain) to Raquette Lake in Hamilton County in the central Adirondacks. New York State has classified the Marion as a Scenic River.

The Marion River Carry is a portage around the rapids in the Marion River to Utowana Lake. The carry was shortened by a dam, that raised the level of the river and then by the Marion River Carry Railroad; at 1,320 yards (1,210 m), it was the shortest standard-gauge railroad line in the United States.

There is a detailed, animated, three-dimensional model of the carry railroad at the Adirondack Museum in Blue Mountain Lake.

== History ==
The Marion River played an important part in the development of the central Adirondacks. Both Blue Mountain Lake and Raquette Lake were acquired by Thomas Clark Durant, developer of the Union Pacific Railroad, as part of the building of the Adirondack Railway to North Creek in the 1870s. Durant, his son, William West Durant, and other family members built hotels and great camps on both lakes. W.W. Durant dammed the river at the Utowana end in 1879, and operated a sawmill there; this also allowed steamboats to travel most of its length. This was followed in 1900 by the Marion Carry Railroad, which operated until 1929. Efforts to save one of the steam locomotives from the railroad in 1947 led to the creation of the Adirondack Museum in Blue Mountain Lake, where the engine may still be seen. It was also unusual in connecting to steamboat routes on either end, rather than other railways.
