= Joe Bryere =

American woodworker

Joseph O.A. Bryere (1859 – 1941), was a guide in the Adirondacks and a noted woodworking artist whose style played a significant role in creating the rustic, “Adirondack look” we know today. Along with Ernest Stowe, Seth Pierce, George Wilson and other master craftsmen, Bryere helped create the rustic aura so desired in the Adirondack great camps of the late 19th century and early 20th century.

Bryere, was born in Sainte-Anne-de-la-Pérade, on the north shore of the St. Lawrence River, in Quebec, Canada. According to the Drouin Collection, the spelling of the Bryere name was interchangeable from Briere to Bryère.

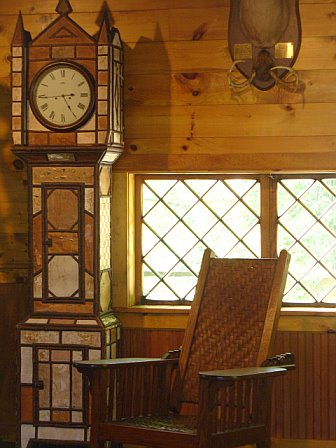
Clock made by J.O.A. Bryere, on display at the Adirondack Museum

By the early 1880s, Bryere had made his way into the United States and eventually to Raquette Lake, located in Hamilton County, New York, in the central Adirondacks. He worked for a few years on Camp Fairview, owned by Charles Durant, cousin of William West Durant. From early on he was known then for his enterprising ability and physical strength. At that time, the Adirondacks were not heavily populated, and many frontiersmen made their claim to land by squatting for long periods of time, in stark distinction from many of the railroad magnates who could own tens of thousands of acres of land in the Adirondacks.

After moving to the Adirondacks, Bryere met Mary Agnes Gooley, and they were married in 1884 at Ed Bennett's Inn, Under the Hemlocks. They had four children. They were the first couple known to be married at Raquette Lake. Together they built Brightside on Raquette log by log, living in tents, shacks and eventually in the original hotel they had built together. Brightside was opened in 1891.

Bryere became known for his work over the course of his lifetime by crafting numerous pieces of furniture, which he sold or used to furnish Brightside. As Adirondack furniture became more and more popular through the 20th century, the style of his work was duplicated by large numbers of craftsmen. Today, a large collection of his work is on display at the Adirondack Museum in Blue Mountain Lake, New York.

== Sources ==
- Gilborn, Craig, Adirondack Furniture and the Rustic Tradition, New York: Harry N. Abrams, 2000.
- Timm, Ruth, Raquette Lake: A Time to Remember, Utica, North Country Books, 1989, ISBN 0-932052-63-0.
- State of New York Annual Report of the Forest Commission For the Year 1893, Vol. 1., Albany: James B. Lyon, State Printer. 1894, Pg. 343
