= Utowana Lake =

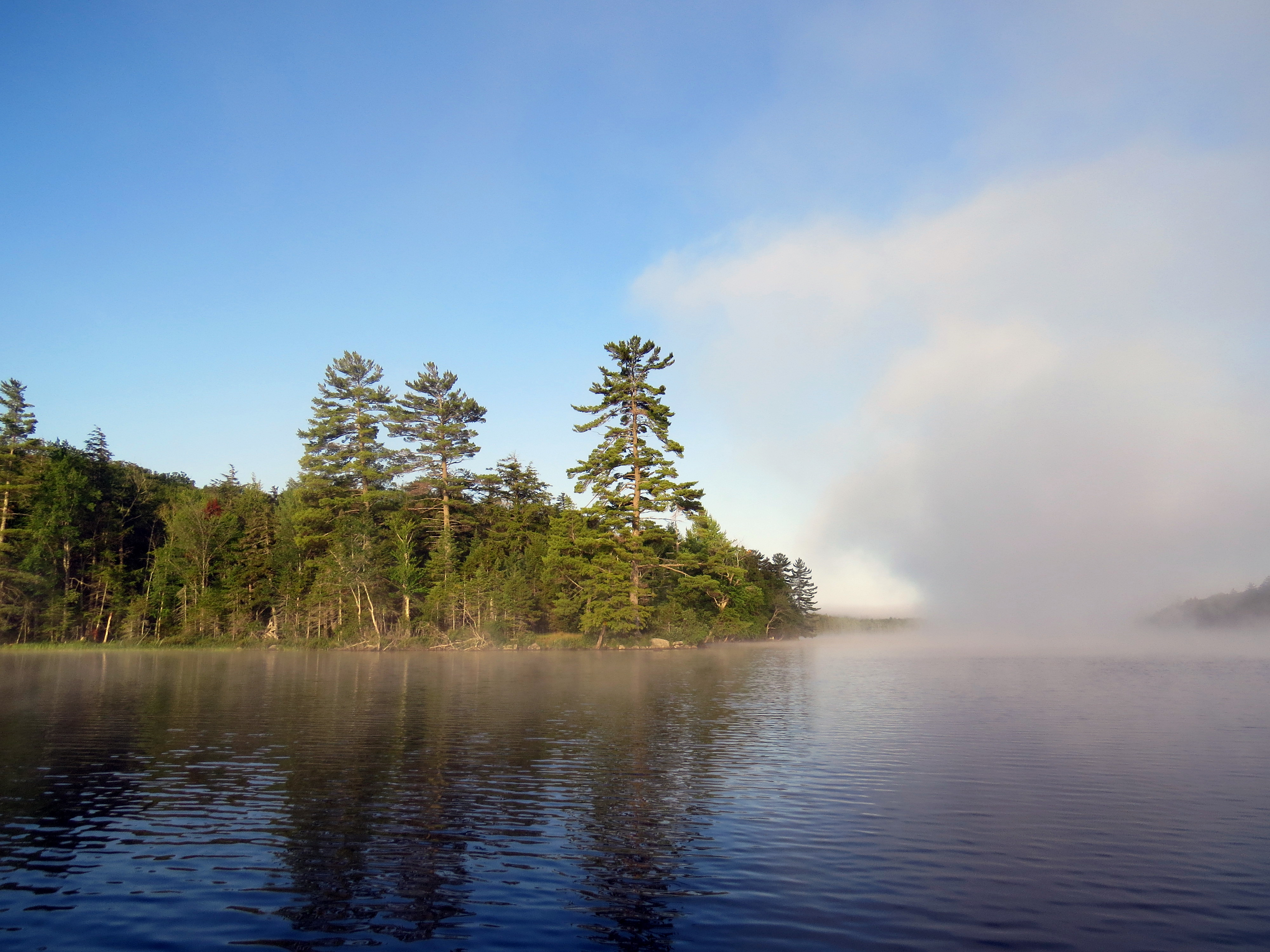
- The lake looking north

- Location within New York Utowana Lake (the United States)
- Location: Hamilton County, New York
- Coordinates: 43°50′02″N 74°31′08″W, 43°50′22″N 74°29′38″W
- Type: Lake
- Primary inflows: Marion River
- Primary outflows: Marion River
- Basin countries: United States
- Surface area: 300 acres (1.2 km^{2})
- Average depth: 12 feet (3.7 m)
- Max. depth: 24 feet (7.3 m)
- Shore length^{1}: 4.7 miles (7.6 km)
- Surface elevation: 1,788 feet (545 m)
- Settlements: Blue Mountain Lake, New York
- ^{1} Shore length is not a well-defined measure.

Utowana Lake is a lake in the Eckford Chain in the Adirondack Mountains of the state of New York. It is connected to Eagle Lake and Blue Mountain Lake to the east and the Marion River/Raquette Lake to the west. It was owned by adventure writer Ned Buntline in 1867 and by William West Durant in 1888 before being purchased by mining magnate Berthold Hochschild in 1904. A significant part of the north shore is still owned by the Hochschild family as part of the Eagle Nest camp; the rest is under conservation easements.

== Fishing ==
Fish species present in Utowana Lake are brook trout, white sucker, sunfish, black bullhead, atlantic salmon, yellow perch, and smallmouth bass. Access via channel from Eagle Lake.
