= Blue Mountain Fire Observation Station =

- U.S. National Register of Historic Places
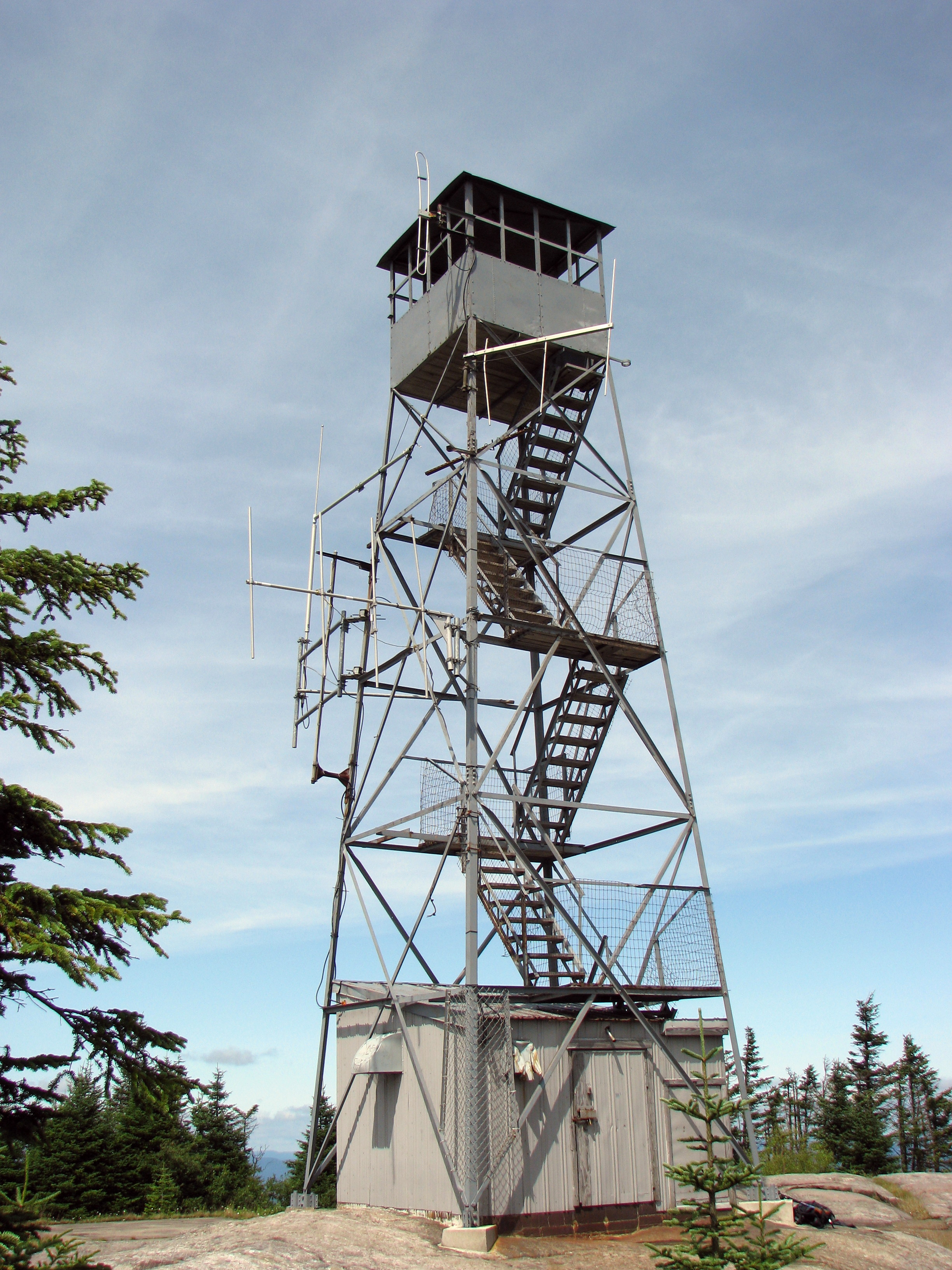
- Blue Mountain Fire Observation Tower, August 2009

- Location within New York Location within the United States
- Location: Blue Mountain, Indian Lake, New York
- Coordinates: 43°52′20.6″N 74°24′3.4″W
- Area: 14.6 acres (5.9 ha)
- Built: 1917
- Architect: Aermotor Corporation
- MPS: Fire Observation Stations of New York State Forest Preserve MPS
- NRHP reference No.: 01001035
- Added to NRHP: September 23, 2001

The Blue Mountain Fire Observation Station is a historic fire observation station located on Blue Mountain at Indian Lake in Hamilton County, New York. The station includes a 35-foot-tall (11 m), steel frame lookout tower built in 1917, an observer's cabin built in 1975, the remains of three observer's cabins, remains of a radar station built in the 1960s, and remnants of telephone lines along the foot trail. There are four contributing resources: the tower, trail, remnants of a 1949 observer's cabin, and 1890s stone benchmark. The tower is a prefabricated structure built by the Aermotor Corporation and provided a front line of defense in preserving the Adirondack Forest Preserve from the hazards of forest fires.

It was added to the National Register of Historic Places in 2001.
