= Blue Mountain House Annex =

- U.S. National Register of Historic Places
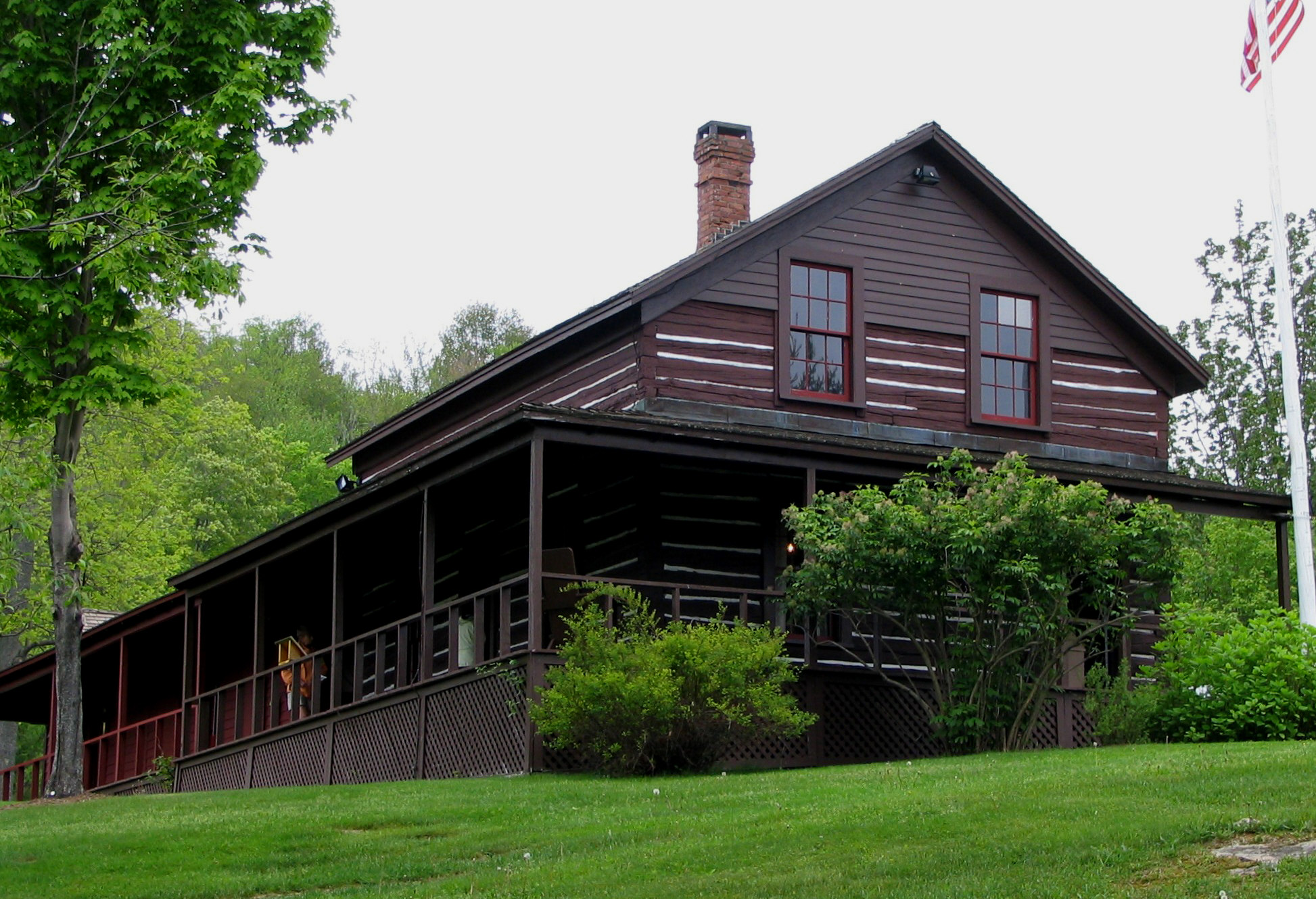
- Log Hotel, June 2008

- Location within New York Location within the United States
- Location: NY 30, Blue Mountain Lake, New York
- Coordinates: 43°51′19″N 74°26′2″W
- Area: less than one acre
- Built: 1876
- Architect: Merwin, M. Tyler
- Architectural style: Log building
- NRHP reference No.: 77000941
- Added to NRHP: December 7, 1977

Blue Mountain House Annex, also known as The Log Hotel, is a historic hotel located on the grounds of the Adirondack Experience museum in Blue Mountain Lake in Hamilton County, New York, USA. It was built in 1876 and is a two-story structure built of square-hewn spruce logs with halved log cornering. It features a verandah on the south and east. It is one of the earliest and best known of the Adirondack resort hotels.

The annex was restored on its site after the museum acquired the property in 1954. It was added to the National Register of Historic Places in 1977.
