= Blue Mountain (New York) =

Mountain in New York, United States

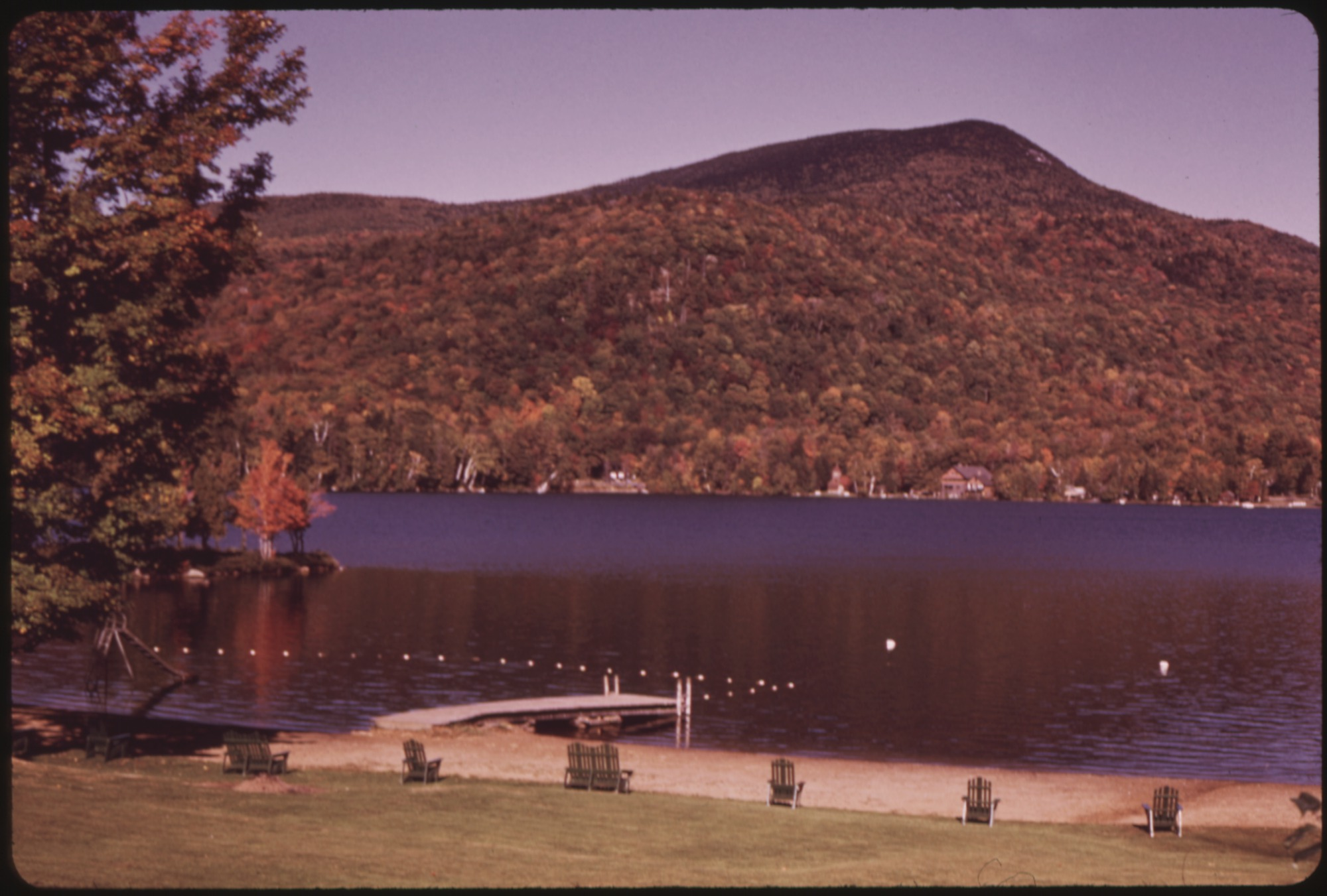
- Blue Mountain Lake with Blue Mountain in the background

Highest point
- Elevation: 3,750 feet (1,140 m)
- Listing: Adirondack Hundred Highest 67th
- Coordinates: 43°52′21″N 74°24′04″W, 43°52′33″N 74°24′00″W

Geography
- Location within New York Adirondack Park Location within the United States
- Location: E of Blue Mountain Lake, New York, U.S.
- Topo map: USGS Blue Mountain Lake

Blue Mountain is a peak in the Adirondack Mountains of New York State in the United States. Located east of Blue Mountain Lake, Hamilton County, the peak reaches a height of 3,750 ft (1,140 m). For hiking, the elevation gain is 1,559 feet (475 meters) and the trail length is four miles. The trailhead elevation is 2,200 feet (670 meters). It is the location of the Blue Mountain Fire Observation Station, listed on the National Register of Historic Places in 2001.

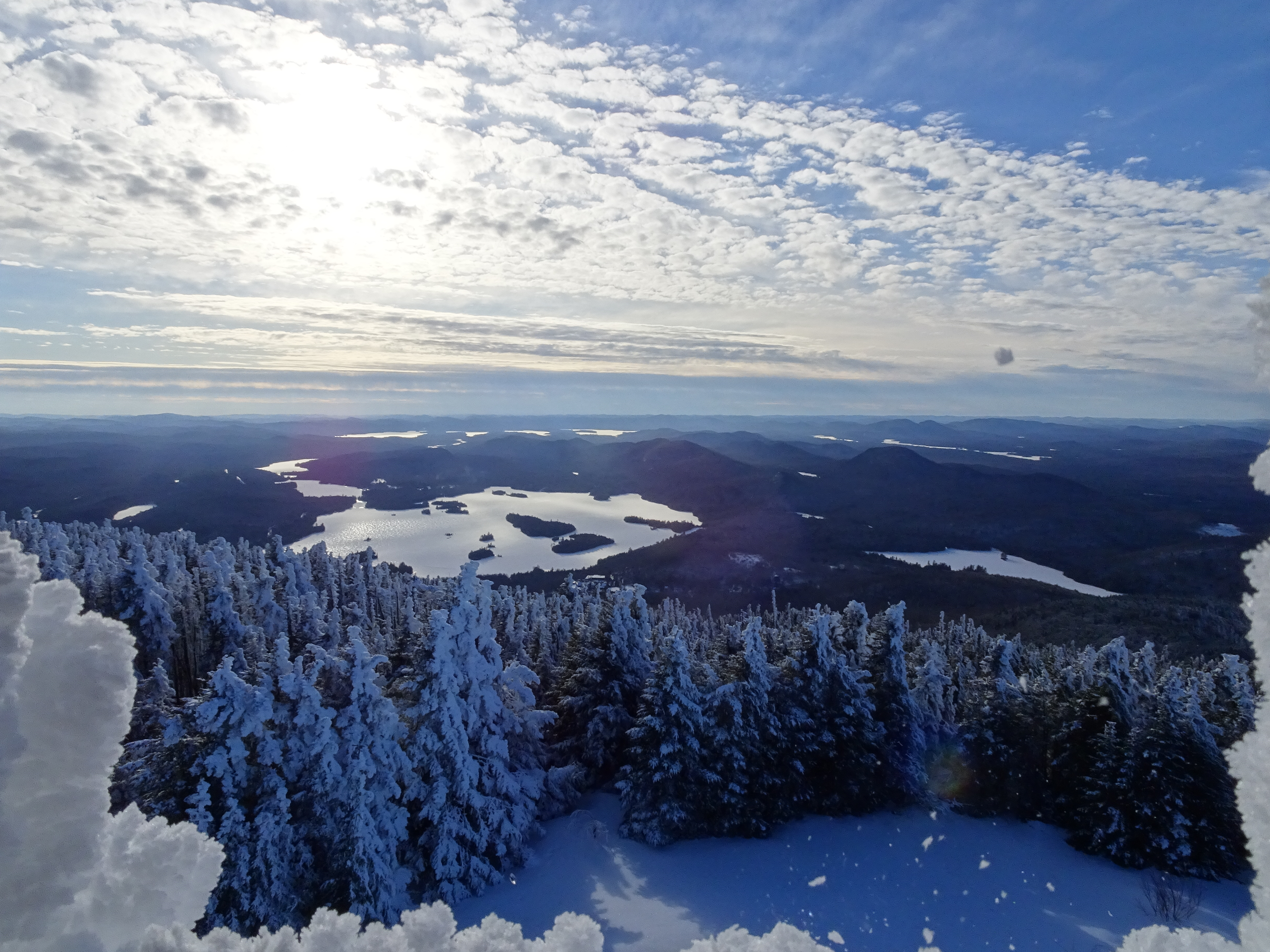
View from Blue Mountain summit over Blue Mountain Lake

== History ==
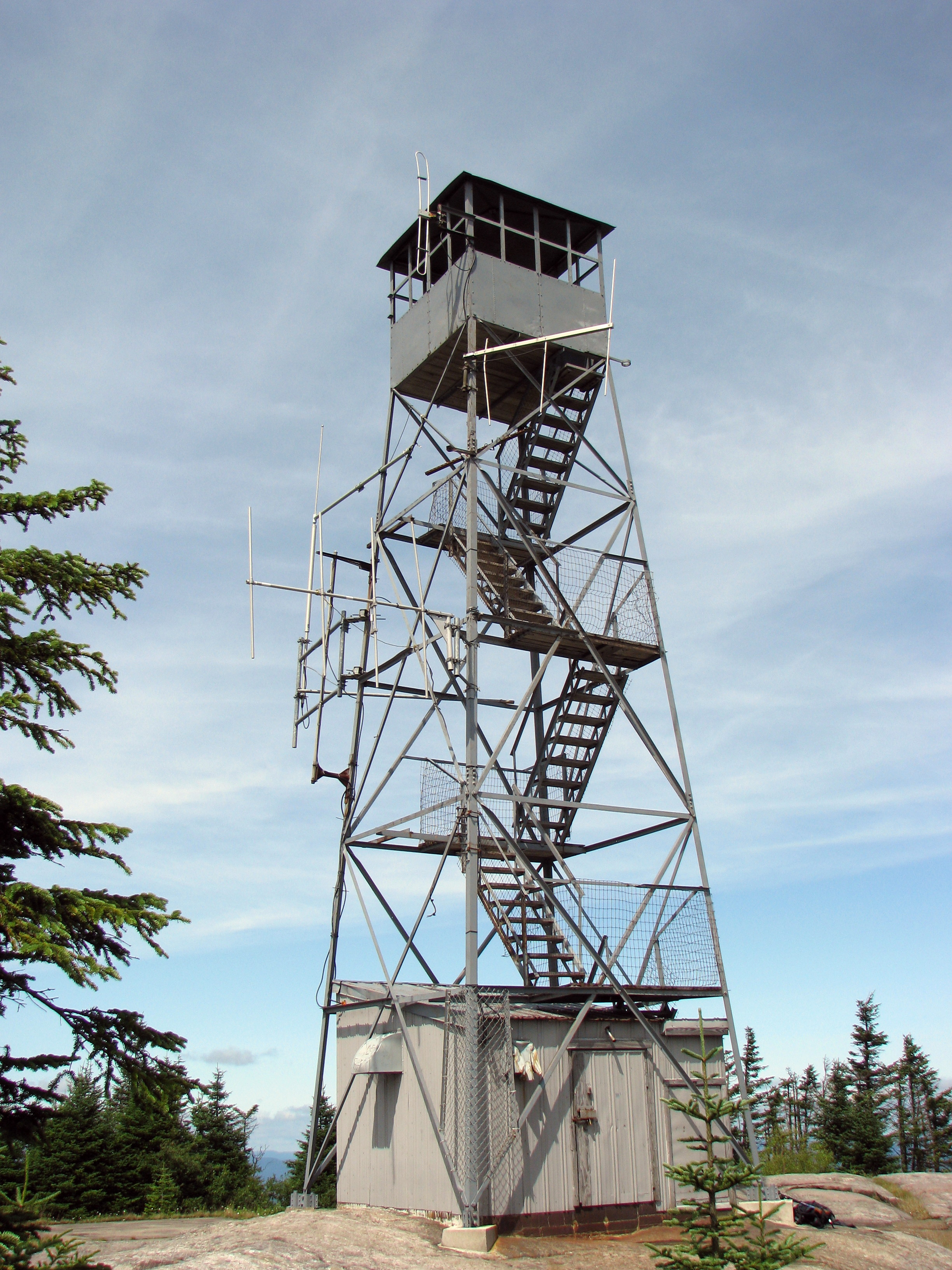
Blue Mountain Fire Observation Tower, August 2009

In September 1911, the Civilian Conservation Corps (CCC) built a 30-foot-tall (9.1 m) wooden tower. In 1917, the CCC replaced the wooden tower with a 35-foot-tall (11 m) Aermotor LS40 tower. During the Cold War the threat of nuclear annihilation was a serious concern. The United States Air Force developed and deployed what where known as "gap-filler" radar stations, which had a range of around 65 miles (105 km). One of these stations was built on Blue Mountain and became operational in January 1959 and was decommissioned in December 1967. The fire tower ceased fire lookout operations in 1990, and was one of the last operating fire towers in New York State. It was one of the longest operating towers in New York, second only to the St. Regis Mountain fire tower. In 1992, the fire tower and cabin were seriously vandalized by unknown individuals. The incident occurred around the same time that Pharaoh Mountain tower was toppled, and some believe it may have been done by the same people. The tower was added to the National Register of Historic Places in 2001. The FFLA, Team Rubicon, and New York State Department of Environmental Conservation did significant restoration work on the tower in 2019.
