= Eckford chain =

Group of lakes in New York, United States

Coordinates: 43.858°N 74.450°W

The Eckford Chain of lakes is composed of Blue Mountain Lake, Eagle Lake, and Utowana Lake in the Adirondack Mountains in New York. The chain was named for Henry Eckford, a noted engineer and ship builder who made a survey of the lakes in 1811. All of the lakes are located in the town of Indian Lake, in Hamilton County.

== History ==
The lakes formed a part of a major transportation route in the early history of the Adirondacks, connecting Blue Mountain Lake to Raquette Lake via the Marion River. From Raquette Lake, one could travel via the Fulton Chain of Lakes west to Old Forge, or north via the Raquette River to the Saranac River and thence to Lake Champlain.

== Notes ==
- Jamieson, Paul and Morris, Donald, Adirondack Canoe Waters, North Flow, Lake George, NY: Adirondack Mountain Club, 1987. ISBN 0-935272-43-7.
