= Blue Mountain Lake (New York lake) =

Lake in the United States

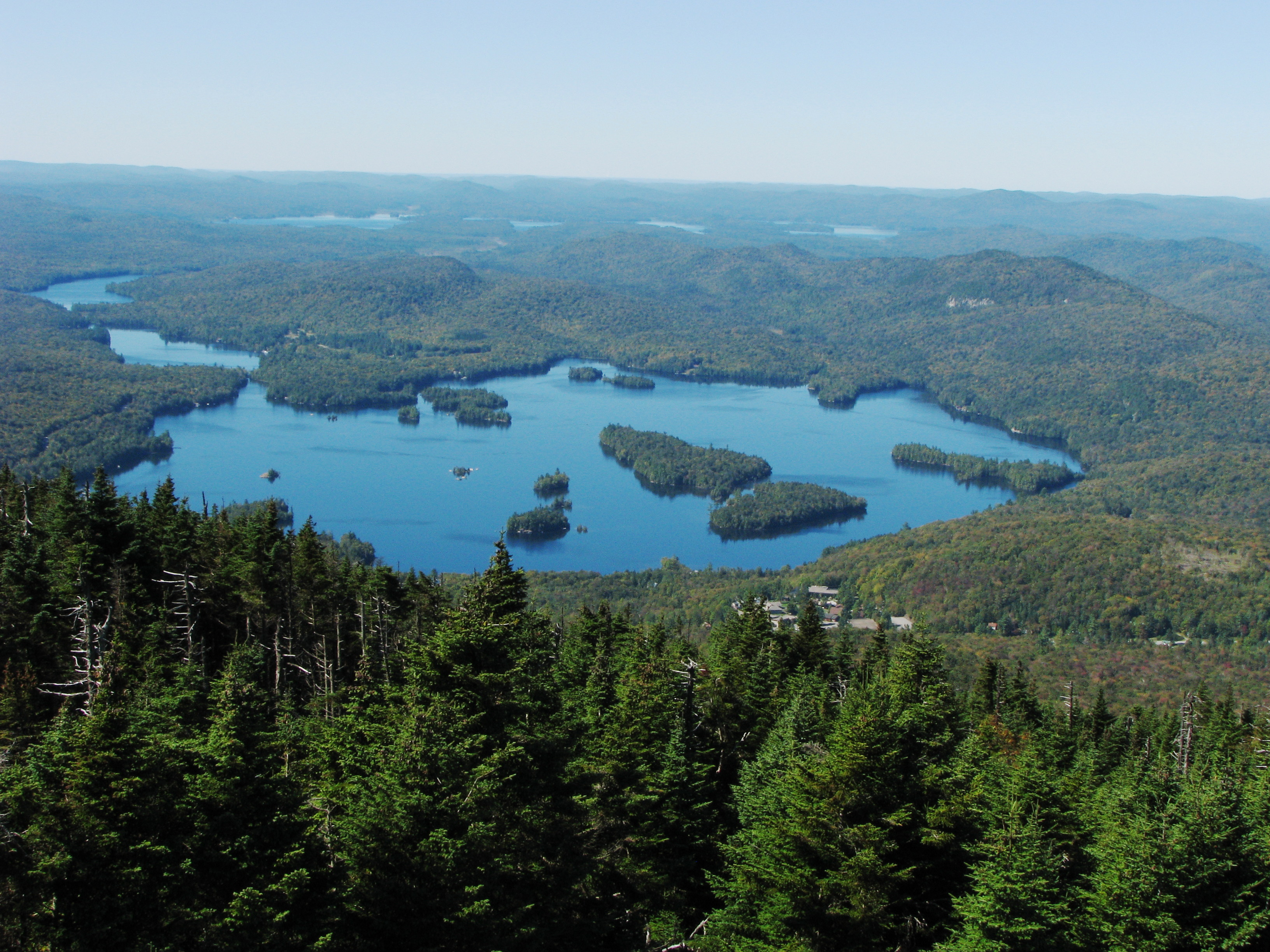
- Blue Mountain Lake from Blue Mountain

- Location within New York Blue Mountain Lake (the United States)
- Location: Adirondacks, Indian Lake, Hamilton County, New York, US
- Coordinates: 43.862°N 74.457°W
- Type: Lake
- Primary outflows: Marion River
- Basin countries: United States
- Max. length: 2.5 mi (4.0 km)
- Max. width: 1.25 mi (2.01 km)
- Surface area: 1,334 acres (540 ha)
- Average depth: 46 ft (14 m)
- Max. depth: 100 ft (30 m)
- Shore length^{1}: 8.5 mi (13.7 km)
- Surface elevation: 1,790 ft (550 m)
- Islands: 10; Long Island; Osprey Island
- Settlements: Blue Mountain Lake (hamlet)
- ^{1} Shore length is not a well-defined measure.

Blue Mountain Lake is a 1,334-acre (540 ha) lake in Hamilton County, New York, in the central Adirondacks. Blue Mountain Lake is the eastern end of the Eckford chain of lakes. It is located west of Blue Mountain. The hamlet of Blue Mountain Lake lies on its southeastern shore and the Adirondack Museum looks down from high above its eastern shore. It has been a popular vacation destination since the mid-19th century.

== Fishing ==
Fish species in the lake include lake trout, rainbow trout, smallmouth bass, landlocked salmon and smelt. There is only fee access at two private marina launches in the village of Blue Mountain Lake. There are also boat rentals available.

== History ==
The Blue Mountain Lake House was built in 1874 by John G. Holland. Soon after, an earlier resident, Miles Tyler Merwin, enlarged his log cabin on a spur of Blue Mountain overlooking the lake into the Blue Mountain house; the Log Hotel is now on the grounds of the Adirondack Museum. In 1881, Frederick C. Durant, cousin of William West Durant, built the Prospect House, the most luxurious hotel then existing in the Adirondacks; it was the first hotel in the world to have electric light in every room.

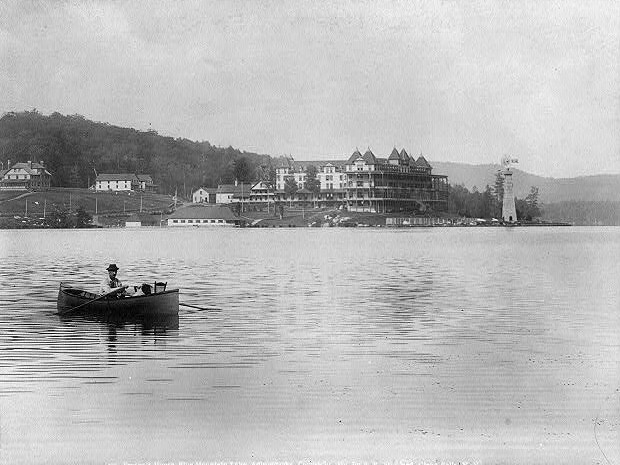
Prospect House, 1889
(Seneca Ray Stoddard)

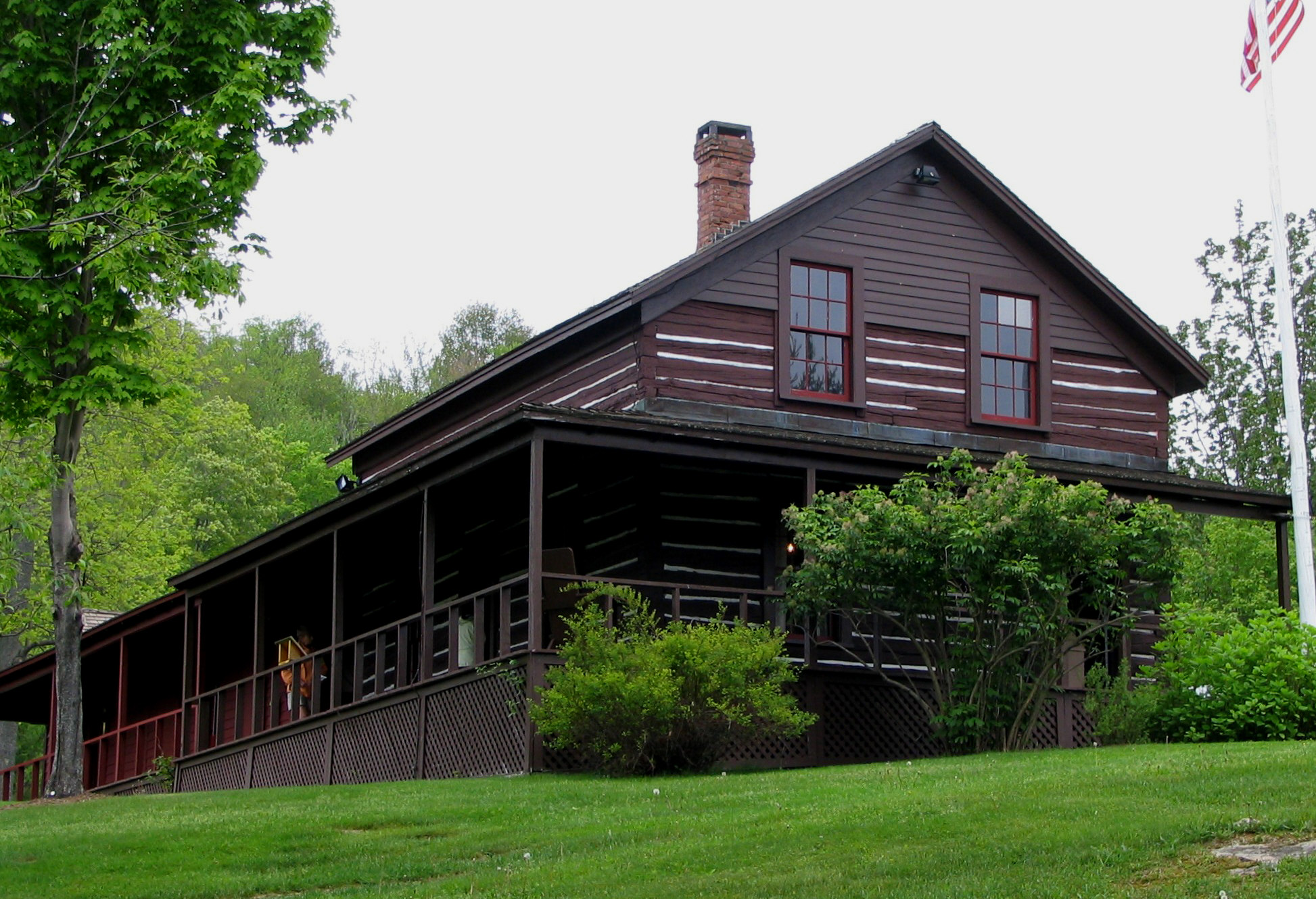
The Log Hotel on Blue Mountain Lake, at the Adirondack Museum

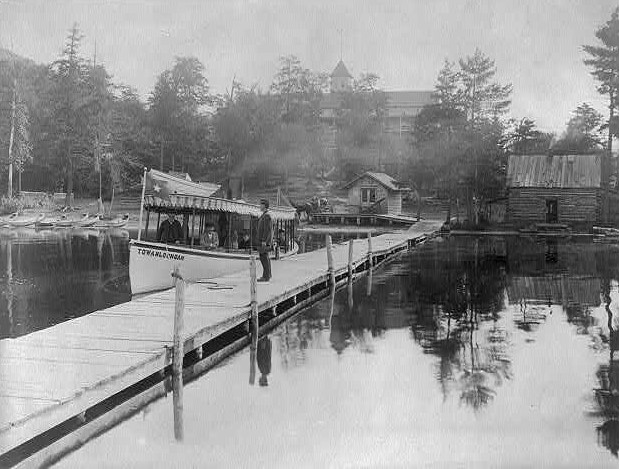
Small steamboat Towahloondah - 1889 - Seneca Ray Stoddard

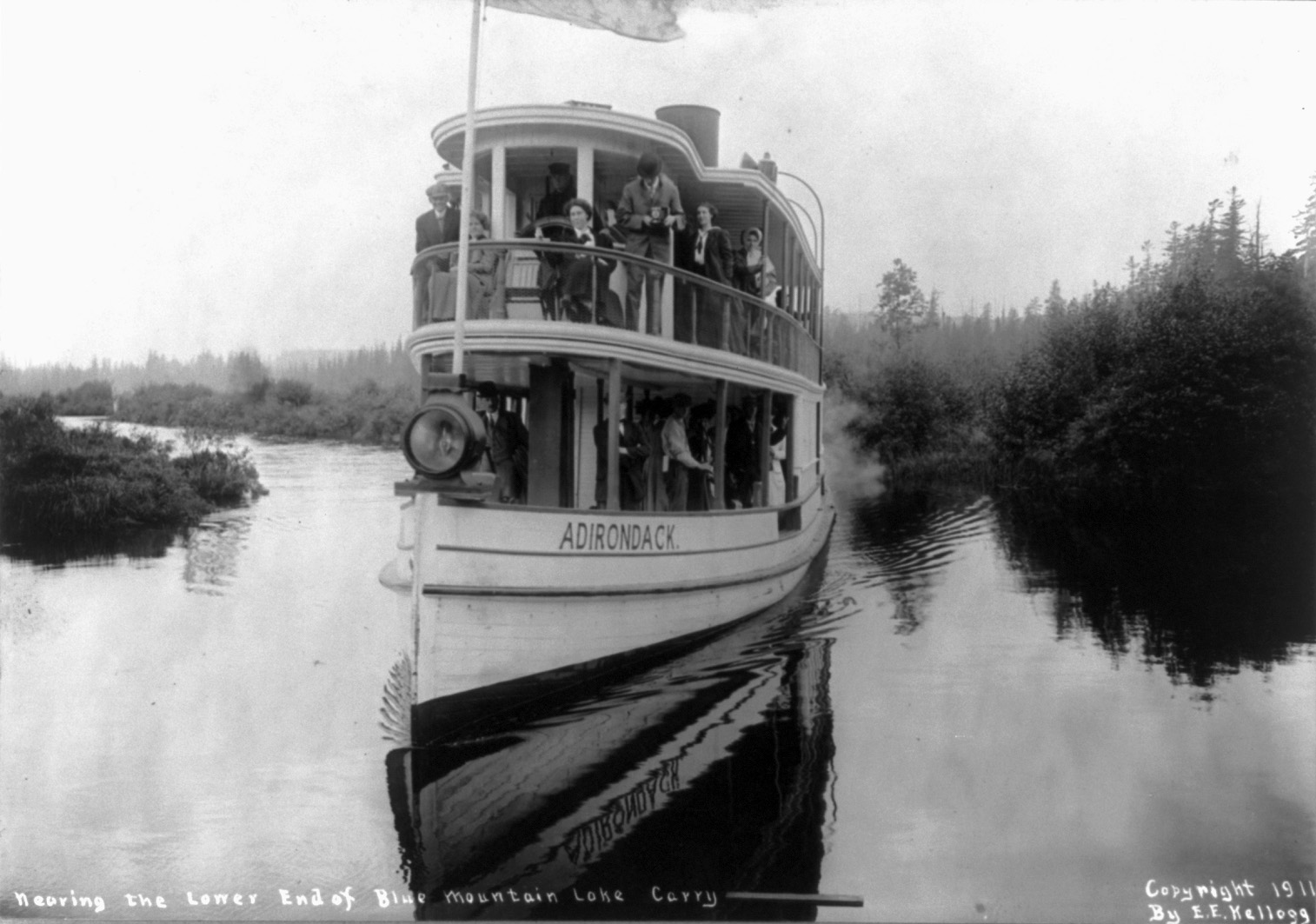
Boat carrying tourists, 1911

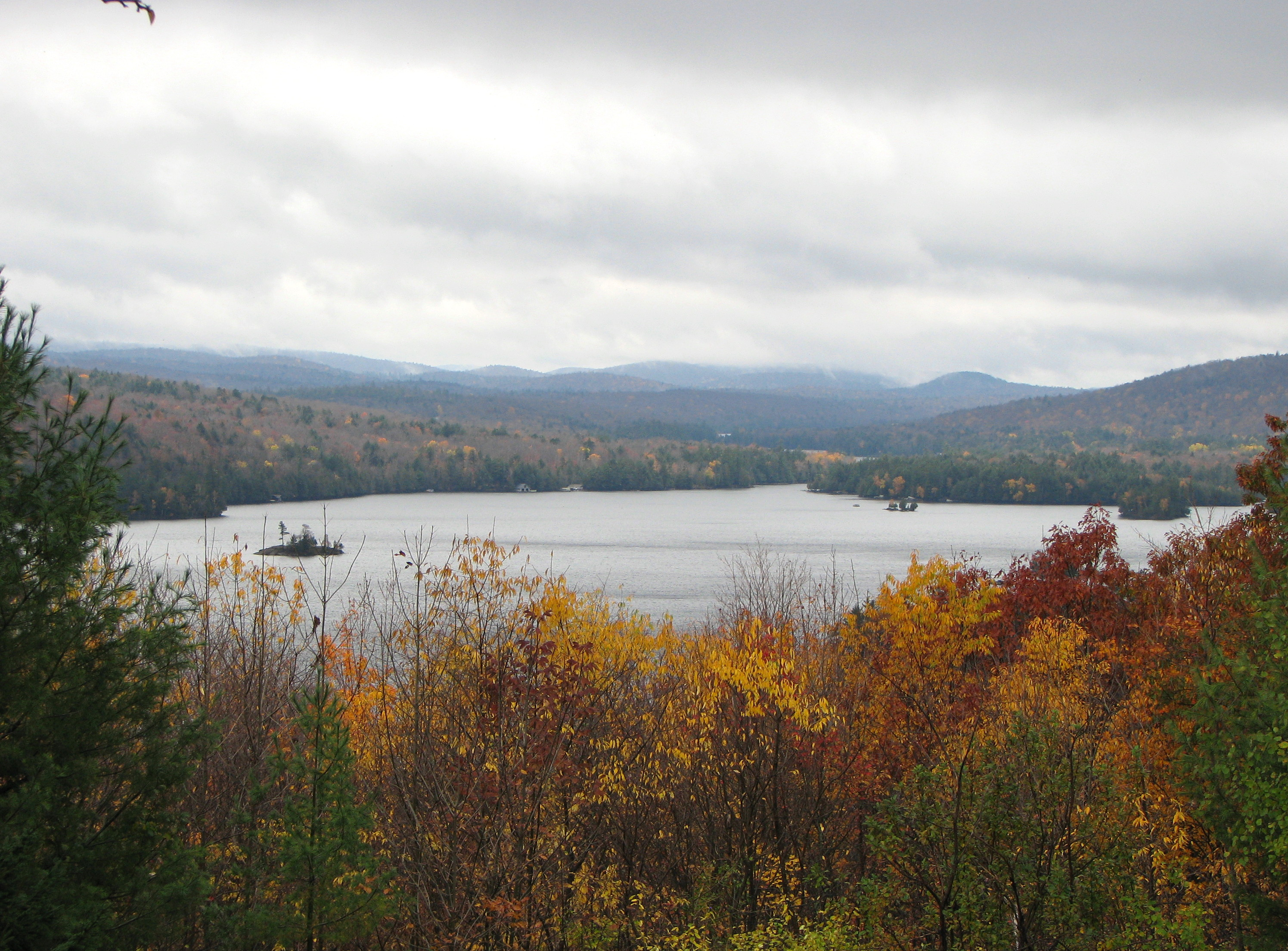
Blue Mountain Lake from the Adirondack Museum
