= Adirondack Woodcraft Camps =

Summer camp in Old Forge, New York, US

Adirondack Woodcraft Summer Camps is a co-ed, sleep-away summer camp in the Adirondack mountains in Old Forge, New York. Also known as AWC or Woodcraft, the camp was founded in 1925 by William Abbott. Abbott, with the backing of investors, bought the property after coming across two small lakes while scouting the area for New York State. The camp was later bought by the Leach family and was directed by John Leach and Dave Leach for 40 years. Adirondack Woodcraft Camps is currently owned and directed by Doug Bartlett & Christina Schibli Bartlett.

== Name ==
The name "Woodcraft" comes from an old term which describes the craft of living and surviving in the outdoors as well as knowledge of the forest. It is not a woodworking camp. The word "Camps" is plural because originally the different age divisions were regarded as separate camps.

== Location ==
Adirondack Woodcraft Summer Camps is located in the Adirondacks in upstate New York in Old Forge. The summer camp is located in Herkimer County in the Town of Webb and encompasses 250 acres surrounding two private lakes, Lake Kan-ac-to and Lake Te-jec-na, two small kettle lakes about four miles northeast of the village of Old Forge. The North Branch of the Moose River passes the camp just to the north. Woodcraft's location is considered to be in the West-Central Region of the Adirondack State Park.

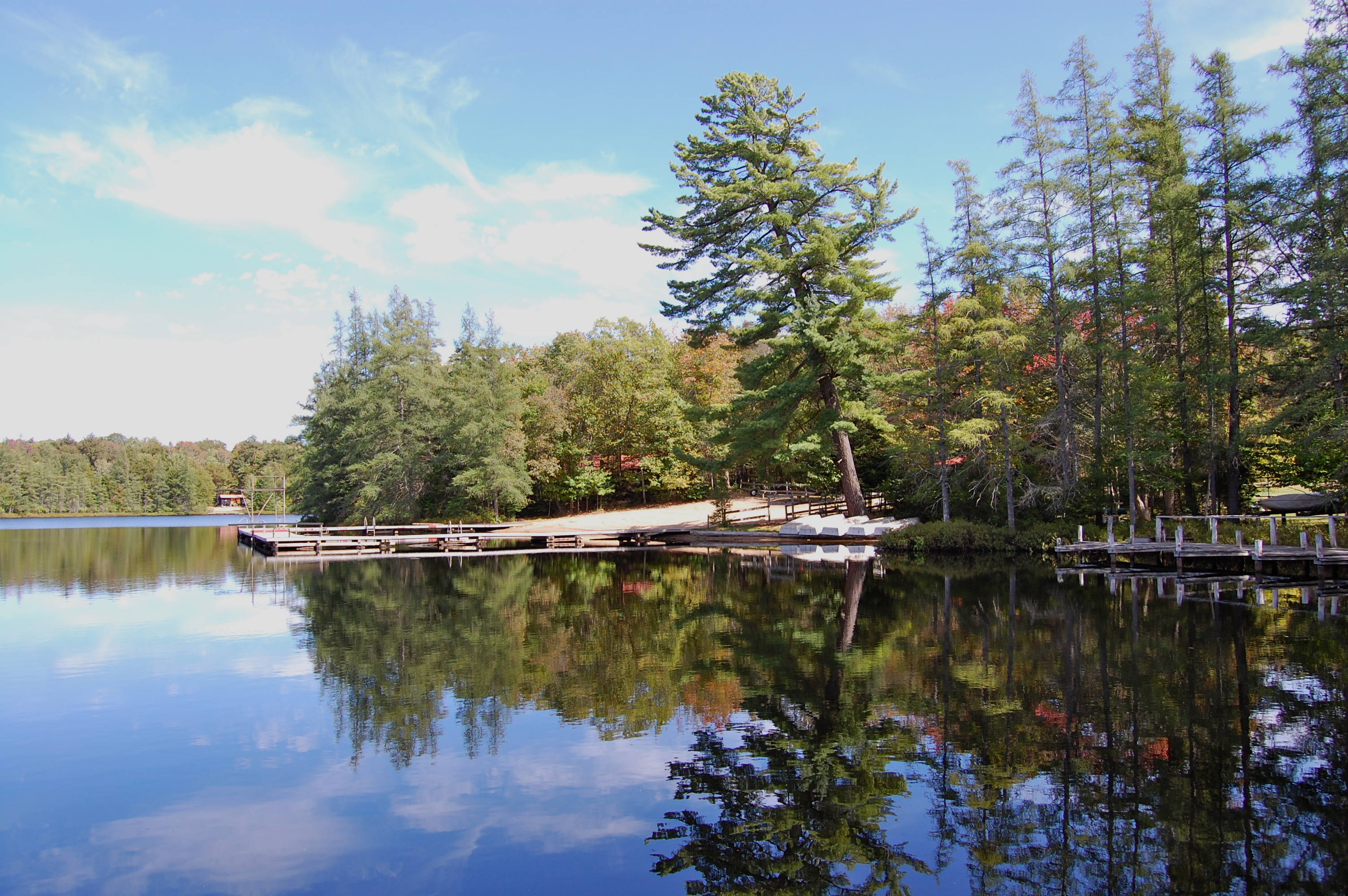
Lake Kan-Ac-To

== Program ==
Adirondack Woodcraft Summer Camps runs a traditional outdoor-oriented program. Campers experience canoeing, swimming, hiking, arts & crafts, nature education, mountain biking, archery, riflery, and rock climbing. Canoeing and hiking trips are taken to many parts of the Adirondack State Park.
