= Dog Island (New York) =

Island in Herkimer County, New York, United States

- Location within New York

Geography
- Location: First Lake
- Coordinates: 43°42′37″N 74°55′31″W
- Highest elevation: 1,706 ft (520 m)

Administration
- United States
- State: New York
- County: Herkimer
- Town: Webb

Dog Island is an island on First Lake in Herkimer County, New York. It is located east of Old Forge. DeCamps Island is located northeast of Dog Island.
