= Summit Mountain (New York) =

Mountain in New York, United States

- Location within New York Adirondack Park Location within the United States

Highest point
- Elevation: 2,359 feet (719 m)
- Coordinates: 43°59′48″N 74°55′00″W

Geography
- Location: NW of Little Rapids, New York, USA
- Topo map: USGS Beaver River

Summit Mountain is a summit in Herkimer County, New York in the Adirondack Mountains. It is located northwest of Little Rapids in the Town of Webb. Deer Mountain is located northeast, Sitz Mountain is located west and Mount Electra is located east-southeast of Summit Mountain.
