= Burnt Mountain (New York) =

Mountain in New York, United States

- Location within New York Adirondack Park Location within the United States

Highest point
- Elevation: 1,965 feet (599 m)
- Coordinates: 43°41′28″N 74°53′07″W

Geography
- Location: ESE of Old Forge, New York, U.S.
- Topo map: USGS Old Forge

Burnt Mountain is a summit in the Adirondack Mountains, located in Herkimer County, New York, USA. It is located east-southeast of Old Forge in the Town of Webb. Fernow Mountain is located north-northeast and McCauley Mountain is located west of Burnt Mountain.
