= DeCamps Island =

Island in New York, United States

- Location within New York

Geography
- Location: First Lake/ Second Lake
- Coordinates: 43°43′00″N 74°55′06″W
- Highest elevation: 1,706 ft (520 m)

Administration
- United States
- State: New York
- County: Herkimer
- Town: Webb

DeCamps Island is an island between First Lake and Second Lake in Herkimer County, New York. It is located east of Old Forge. Dog Island is located southwest of DeCamps Island.
