= South Branch Moose River =

Location
- Country: United States
- State: New York

Physical characteristics
- Source: Little Moose Lake
- Mouth: Moose River
  - location: McKeever, New York
  - coordinates: 43°38′37″N 74°57′14″W
  - elevation: 1,577 ft (481 m)
- Basin size: 179 mi^{2} (460 km^{2})

Basin features
- Tributaries
  - left: Indian River
  - right: Nicks Creek

The South Branch Moose River is a river located in Herkimer County, New York. The river starts at Little Moose Lake. South of Old Forge, New York the South Branch and Middle Branch join to become Moose River. Limekiln Falls is located on the South Branch Moose River.

== History ==
On June 15, 1991 five kayakers descended the river from its source and through the private, posted property of the Adirondack League Club. The journey was to test the laws regarding the rights of the public to paddle on water that flows over private property. The League Club was given advance notice, and the trip was taped by both groups as evidence. As expected the League Club promptly sued the paddlers, and the Sierra Club for five million dollars. The case Adirondack League Club vs. Sierra Club established that recreational use can be considered in determining if a river is a public highway. The case was settled in 2000 before it was determined if the river was a public highway. The settlement allows public access at certain times of the year and under certain conditions.

== Tributaries ==
Right

Butter Brook
Silver Run
Pine Grove Creek
Red River
Lost Brook
Deadmans Gulch
Pico Creek
Limekiln Creek
Little Moose Outlet
Nicks Creek

Left

Otter Brook
Indian River
Canachagala Brook
Otter Brook
Combs Brook
