= Bottle Mountain =

Mountain in New York, United States

- Location within New York Location within the United States

Highest point
- Elevation: 2,372 feet (723 m)
- Coordinates: 43°45′15″N 74°54′12″W

Geography
- Location: NE of Old Forge, New York, U.S.
- Topo map: USGS Old Forge

Bottle Mountain is a summit located in Central New York Region of New York located in the Town of Webb in Herkimer County, northeast of Old Forge.
