= Bare Mountain (New York) =

Mountain in New York, United States

- Location within New York Adirondack Park Location within the United States

Highest point
- Elevation: 2,011 feet (613 m)
- Coordinates: 43°40′31″N 75°04′26″W

Geography
- Location: NNW of Minnehaha, New York, U.S.
- Topo map: USGS Thendara

Bare Mountain is a summit located in Herkimer County, New York in the Adirondack Mountains. It is located north-northwest of Minnehaha in the Town of Webb. Flatrock Mountain is located southeast of Bare Mountain.
