= Flatrock Mountain =

Mountain in New York, United States

- Location within New York Location within the United States

Highest point
- Elevation: 2,051 feet (625 m)
- Coordinates: 43°40′05″N 75°03′31″W

Geography
- Location: SW of Old Forge, New York, U.S.
- Topo map: USGS Thendara

Flatrock Mountain is a summit located in Central New York Region of New York located in the Town of Webb in Herkimer County, southwest of Old Forge. Bare Mountain is located northwest of Flatrock Mountain.
