= Wheeler Pond (Old Forge, New York) =

- Location of Wheeler Pond within New York
- Location: Herkimer County, New York
- Coordinates: 43°44′30″N 74°57′45″W
- Type: Lake
- Basin countries: United States
- Surface area: 13 acres (5.3 ha)
- Surface elevation: 1,722 ft (525 m)
- Settlements: Old Forge

Wheeler Pond is a small lake north-northeast of Old Forge in Herkimer County, New York. It drains south via an unnamed creek which flows into the North Branch Moose River.

== See also ==
- List of lakes in New York
