= Slide Off Mountain =

Mountain in New York, United States

- Location within New York Location within the United States

Highest point
- Elevation: 2,218 feet (676 m)
- Coordinates: 43°46′53″N 74°53′42″W

Geography
- Location: NE of Old Forge, New York, U.S.
- Topo map: USGS Big Moose

Slide Off Mountain is a summit located in Central New York Region of New York located in the Town of Webb in Herkimer County, northeast of Old Forge.
