= Beaver Dam Pond =

Lake in Herkimer County, New York, United States

- Location within New York
- Location: Herkimer County, New York, United States
- Coordinates: 43.5812°N 74.5405°W
- Basin countries: United States
- Surface area: 32 acres (0.13 km^{2})
- Average depth: 5 feet (1.5 m)
- Max. depth: 15 feet (4.6 m)
- Shore length^{1}: 1.3 miles (2.1 km)
- Surface elevation: 1,726 feet (526 m)
- Settlements: Stillwater, New York
- ^{1} Shore length is not a well-defined measure.

Beaver Dam Pond is located northeast of Stillwater, New York. The outflow creek flows into Witchhopple Lake. Fish species present in the lake are brown bullhead, and yellow perch. Access via bushwhack trail from Salmon Lake or Witchhopple Lake. No motors are allowed on Beaver Dam Pond.
