= Tooker Mountain =

Mountain in New York, United States

- Location within New York Location within the United States

Highest point
- Elevation: 2,031 feet (619 m)
- Coordinates: 43°38′29″N 75°02′36″W

Geography
- Location: SE of Minnehaha, New York, U.S.
- Topo map: USGS Thendara

Tooker Mountain is a summit located in Central New York Region of New York located in the Town of Webb in Herkimer County, southeast of Minnehaha.
