= Jones Mountain (New York) =

Mountain in New York, United States

- Location within New York Location within the United States

Highest point
- Elevation: 2,100 feet (640 m)
- Coordinates: 43°39′32″N 75°03′26″W

Geography
- Location: SW of Old Forge, New York, U.S.
- Topo map: USGS Thendara

Jones Mountain is a summit located in Central New York Region of New York located in the Town of Webb in Herkimer County, southwest of Old Forge.
