= Neejer Hill =

Mountain in New York, United States

- Location within New York Location within the United States

Highest point
- Elevation: 1,939 feet (591 m)
- Coordinates: 43°34′31″N 75°03′01″W

Geography
- Location: S of Minnehaha, New York, U.S.
- Topo map: USGS McKeever

Neejer Hill is a summit located in Central New York Region of New York located in the Town of Webb in Herkimer County, south of Minnehaha.
