= Grass Pond =

Grass Pond may refer to:

- Grass Pond (Stillwater Mountain, New York)
- Grass Pond (Thendara, New York)
