= Old Forge Pond =

Lake in Old Forge, New York, United States

- Location within New York Adirondack Park Location within the United States
- Location: Herkimer County, New York, United States
- Coordinates: 43°42′36.0″N 74°58′04.0″W
- Primary inflows: First Lake, Beaver Brook
- Primary outflows: Middle Branch Moose River
- Basin countries: United States
- Surface area: 51 acres (0.21 km^{2})
- Average depth: 4 feet (1.2 m)
- Max. depth: 11 feet (3.4 m)
- Shore length^{1}: 2.1 miles (3.4 km)
- Surface elevation: 1,719 feet (524 m)
- Settlements: Old Forge, New York
- ^{1} Shore length is not a well-defined measure.

Old Forge Pond is located by Old Forge, New York. Fish species present in the lake are white sucker, black bullhead, rainbow trout, yellow perch, and rock bass. Carry down off NY-28 in Old Forge.

== Structures ==
- Old Forge Dam
- Old Forge Covered Bridge
