= Little Roundtop =

Mountain in New York, United States

- Location within New York Location within the United States

Highest point
- Elevation: 2,028 feet (618 m)
- Coordinates: 43°39′38″N 75°02′36″W

Geography
- Location: SW of Old Forge, New York, U.S.
- Topo map: USGS Thendara

Little Roundtop is a summit located in Central New York Region of New York located in the Town of Webb in Herkimer County, southwest of Old Forge.
