= Little Moose Mountain =

Mountain in New York, United States

- Location within New York Location within the United States

Highest point
- Elevation: 2,349 feet (716 m)
- Coordinates: 43°41′33″N 74°57′07″W

Geography
- Location: SE of Old Forge, New York, U.S.
- Topo map: USGS Old Forge

Little Moose Mountain is a summit located in Central New York Region of New York located in the Town of Webb in Herkimer County, southeast of Old Forge.
