= Sugarloaf Mountain (Webb, New York) =

Mountain peak in New York

- Location within New York Location within the United States

Highest point
- Elevation: 2,264 feet (690 m)
- Coordinates: 43°44′20″N 74°55′54″W

Geography
- Location: NE of Old Forge, New York, U.S.
- Topo map: USGS Old Forge

Sugarloaf Mountain is a summit located in Central New York Region of New York located in the Town of Webb in Herkimer County, northeast of Old Forge.
