= Bisby Lodge =

- Location within New York

Highest point
- Elevation: 2,057 feet (627 m)
- Coordinates: 43°36′19″N 74°56′12″W

Geography
- Location: ESE of Minnehaha, New York, U.S.
- Topo map: USGS Bisby Lakes

Geology
- Mountain type: Bench

Bisby Lodge is a bench in the Central New York Region of New York located in the Town of Webb in Herkimer County, east-southeast of Minnehaha.
