= Salmon Lake (disambiguation) =

Salmon Lake is a lake in Ontario, Canada.

Salmon Lake may also refer to:

- Salmon Lake (Alaska), a lake on the Seward Peninsula
- Salmon Lake (New York), a lake in Herkimer County

== See also ==
- Salmon Lake Dam, Okanogan County, Washington
- Salmon Lake Park, Grapeland, Texas
- Salmon Lake State Park, Montana
- Big Salmon Lake (Ontario)
