= Moulin Mountain =

Mountain in New York, United States

- Location within New York Location within the United States

Highest point
- Elevation: 2,116 feet (645 m)
- Coordinates: 43°43′49″N 74°59′29″W

Geography
- Location: N of Old Forge, New York, U.S.
- Topo map: USGS Old Forge

Moulin Mountain is a summit located in Central New York Region of New York located in the Town of Webb in Herkimer County, north of Old Forge.
