= Trusty Mountain =

Mountain in New York, United States

- Location within New York Location within the United States

Highest point
- Elevation: 2,362 feet (720 m)
- Coordinates: 43°35′59″N 74°56′53″W

Geography
- Location: ESE of Minnehaha, New York, U.S.
- Topo map: USGS Bisby Lakes

Trusty Mountain is a summit located in Central New York Region of New York located in the Town of Webb in Herkimer County, east-southeast of Minnehaha.
