= Moss Lake (New York) =

Lake northwest of Eagle Bay, New York

- Location within New York Moss Lake (the United States)
- Location: Herkimer County, New York, United States
- Coordinates: 43°47′07″N 74°51′00″W
- Basin countries: United States
- Surface area: 113 acres (0.46 km^{2})
- Average depth: 19 feet (5.8 m)
- Max. depth: 50 feet (15 m)
- Shore length^{1}: 2.3 miles (3.7 km)
- Surface elevation: 1,759 feet (536 m)
- Islands: 1
- Settlements: Eagle Bay, New York
- ^{1} Shore length is not a well-defined measure.

Moss Lake also known as Whipple Lake, once Morse Lake, is located northwest of Eagle Bay, New York. The outlet flows into North Branch Moose River. Fish species present in the lake are brook trout, lake trout, atlantic salmon, brown trout, yellow perch, and black bullhead. There is trail access located off Big Moose Lake Road. There is no ice fishing allowed on Moss Lake. A trail connects Moss Lake to Sis Lake and then Bubb Lake.

Moss Lake was known as Whipple Lake in the 1860s, named for Otis W. Whipple of Utica, a member of the North Woods Walton Club. In the 1870s, the lake became known as Morse Lake after an educator and painter named Morse; the name was eventually corrupted to "Moss". The lake was also depicted by painter George W. Waters, best known for his portrait of Walt Whitman.
