= Limekiln Falls =

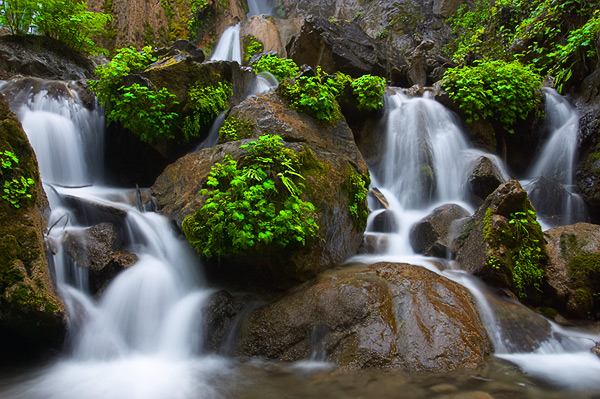
- Limekiln falls

- Location within New York
- Coordinates: 43°39′51″N 74°54′16″W
- Elevation: 1,581 ft (482 m)
- Watercourse: South Branch Moose River

Limekiln Falls is located on South Branch Moose River southeast of Old Forge, New York.

== See also ==
- List of waterfalls
