= Deer Mountain (New York) =

Mountain in New York, United States

- Location within New York Adirondack Park Location within the United States

Highest point
- Elevation: 2,260 feet (690 m)
- Coordinates: 44°01′32″N 74°52′24″W

Geography
- Location: N of Little Rapids, New York, USA
- Topo map: USGS Wolf Mountain

Deer Mountain is a summit in Herkimer County, New York in the Adirondack Mountains. It is located north of Little Rapids in the Town of Webb. Greenfield Mountain is located northwest, Summit Mountain is located southwest and Mount Electra is located south-southeast of Deer Mountain.
