= Melody Island =

Island in Herkimer County, New York, United States

- Location within New York

Geography
- Location: Stillwater Reservoir
- Coordinates: 43°52′04″N 74°59′39″W
- Highest elevation: 1,680 ft (512 m)

Administration
- United States
- State: New York
- County: Herkimer
- Town: Webb

Melody Island is an island on Stillwater Reservoir in Herkimer County, New York. It is located southeast of Stillwater.
