= Indian River (Moose River tributary) =

Location
- Country: United States
- State: New York

Physical characteristics
- Source: Brook Trout Lake
- Mouth: South Branch Moose River
  - location: Old Forge, New York, Hamilton County
  - coordinates: 43°39′22″N 74°45′30″W
  - elevation: 1,825 ft (556 m)
- Basin size: 42.9 mi^{2} (111 km^{2})

The Indian River is a river located in Hamilton County and Herkimer County in New York. The Indian River begins at the mouth of Brook Trout Lake in the West Canada Lakes region of the southwest Adirondack Mountains. The river flows into the South Branch Moose River.

== Course ==
Traveling downstream from Brook Trout Lake, the Indian River picks up the Cobblestone Creek coming in on its left, just before it forms the Green Stillwater, a 1/2 mile long flatwater section at the base of Indian Mountain. Then the river forms a series of rapids for a half mile or so before it slows and forms what is locally called the Big Eddy, a deep pool where the river makes a hard left. After this, the outlet of Mountain Lake joins the Indian River from the left, only 50' below what once was the first crossing of the river, a log bridge that loggers constructed back in the 1960s, in order to bring their logs out to market from the deep woods. The bridge was destroyed by authorities in the 1970s, about when the Indian was declared a wild river by the New York State Department of Environmental Conservation.

Now the river again drops down a series of rapids, and picks up the outlet to Horn Lake and Ice Cave Creek, both from the left, as it bends around right.

The rapids continue for a while, and then pass the second crossing, another logger's bridge that was destroyed. This cut off the road to Horn, and to Cahans Farm, an old homestead way back in the woods below Ice Cave Mountain, and on the way to Canachagala Mountain and Natural Hatchery Brook. Once the river passes this second crossing, it's all flatwater for over a mile, with Stink Lake Mountain to the left, as it winds its way to the South Branch Moose River. It soon is joined by the outlet of Beaver Lake, past a few short rapids in the backwoods, and past a small island before converging with the South Branch Moose River, a mile or so above Rock Dam.
