= Panther Mountain (Herkimer County, New York) =

Mountain in New York, United States

- Location within New York Location within the United States

Highest point
- Elevation: 2,408 feet (734 m)
- Coordinates: 43°40′20″N 74°55′42″W

Geography
- Location: N of Atwell, New York, U.S.
- Topo map: USGS Old Forge

Panther Mountain is a summit located in Central New York Region of New York located in the Towns of Ohio and Webb in Herkimer County, north of Atwell.
