= Little Safford Lake =

Lake in upstate New York

- Location within New York Little Safford Lake (the United States)
- Location: Herkimer County, New York, United States
- Coordinates: 43°45′32″N 74°57′53″W
- Basin countries: United States
- Surface area: 105 acres (0.42 km^{2})
- Average depth: 4 feet (1.2 m)
- Max. depth: 11 feet (3.4 m)
- Shore length^{1}: 4.8 miles (7.7 km)
- Surface elevation: 1,742 feet (531 m)
- Islands: 6
- Settlements: Carter Station, New York
- ^{1} Shore length is not a well-defined measure.

Little Safford Lake is located southeast of Carter Station, New York. The outlet creek flows into the North Branch Moose River. Fish species present in the lake are white sucker, black bullhead, brook trout, yellow perch, and sunfish. Trail access with permit on Webb-Inlet Trail.
