= Lake Rondaxe =

- Location within New York Lake Rondaxe (the United States)
- Location: Herkimer County, New York, United States
- Coordinates: 43°46′01″N 74°54′05″W
- Type: Lake
- Primary inflows: North Branch Moose River
- Primary outflows: North Branch Moose River
- Basin countries: United States
- Surface area: 248 acres (1.00 km^{2})
- Average depth: 10 feet (3.0 m)
- Max. depth: 33 feet (10 m)
- Shore length^{1}: 5.7 miles (9.2 km)
- Surface elevation: 1,719 feet (524 m)
- Islands: 2
- Settlements: Carter Station, New York
- ^{1} Shore length is not a well-defined measure.

Lake Rondaxe is a lake located northeast of Carter Station, New York. Fish species present in the lake are Atlantic salmon, rainbow trout, smallmouth bass, brook trout, yellow perch, and black bullhead. There is no public access.

== Locations and tributaries ==
- West Lake – A small 32 acres (13 ha) lake located south of Lake Rondaxe. West Lake empties into Lake Rondaxe. Fish species in West Lake include brook trout, white sucker, bullhead, rock bass, smallmouth bass, and yellow perch. Carry down access located on east shore.
- Mountain Pond – A small pond located east of Lake Rondaxe. Mountain Pond empties into Lake Rondaxe.
