= West Branch Beaver River =

Location
- Country: United States
- State: New York

Physical characteristics
- Source
  - location: Woods Lake, New York
  - coordinates: 43°51′02″N 74°57′18″W
- Mouth: Stillwater Reservoir
  - location: Beaver River, New York
  - coordinates: 43°53′58″N 74°54′30″W
  - elevation: 1,683 ft (513 m)

West Branch Beaver River is a river in Herkimer County, New York that flows into Stillwater Reservoir by Beaver River, New York.
