= Lake Te-jec-na =

- Location of Lake Te-jec-na within New York
- Location: Herkimer County, New York
- Coordinates: 43°45′13″N 74°55′34″W
- Type: Lake
- Basin countries: United States
- Surface area: 7 acres (2.8 ha)
- Surface elevation: 1,742 ft (531 m)
- Settlements: Old Forge

Lake Te-jec-na is a small lake northeast of Old Forge in Herkimer County, New York. Lake Kan-ac-to is located south.

== See also ==
- List of lakes in New York
