= Gun Harbor Brook =

Location
- Country: United States
- State: New York

Physical characteristics
- Source
  - location: Beaver River, New York
  - coordinates: 43°56′33″N 74°55′09″W
- Mouth: Stillwater Reservoir
  - location: Beaver River, New York
  - coordinates: 43°55′48″N 74°55′33″W
  - elevation: 1,690 ft (520 m)

Gun Harbor Brook is a river in Herkimer County, New York that flows into Stillwater Reservoir at Gun Harbor north of Beaver River, New York.
