= Partlow =

Partlow may refer to:

== People ==
- Brian Partlow, American arena football coach
- Hope Partlow (born 1988), American singer
- Lou Partlow (1892–1981), American football player
- Roy Partlow (1911–1987), American baseball player
- Vern Partlow (1910–1987), American journalist and folk singer
- Corydon Partlow Brown (1848–1891), Canadian politician
- Kaelynn Partlow (born 1997), American autistic television personality and therapist

== Fictional characters ==
- Chris Partlow, a character in the television series The Wire

== Places ==
- Partlow, Virginia, an unincorporated community
- Partlow Mountain, New York
