= Peaked Mountain Lake =

- Location within New York Peaked Mountain Lake (the United States)
- Location: Herkimer County, New York, United States
- Coordinates: 43°54′51″N 75°00′13″W
- Type: Lake
- Basin countries: United States
- Surface area: 42 acres (0.17 km^{2})
- Average depth: 10 feet (3.0 m)
- Max. depth: 39 feet (12 m)
- Shore length^{1}: 1.1 miles (1.8 km)
- Surface elevation: 1,752 feet (534 m)
- Settlements: Stillwater, New York
- ^{1} Shore length is not a well-defined measure.

Peaked Mountain Lake is a lake located northeast of Stillwater, New York, United States. The outflow creek flows into Stillwater Reservoir. Fish species present in the lake are brown bullhead, and brook trout. Access via bushwhack trail from evergreen lake trail. No motors are allowed on Peaked Mountain Lake.
