= Goodsell House =

Historic house in New York, United States

- U.S. National Register of Historic Places
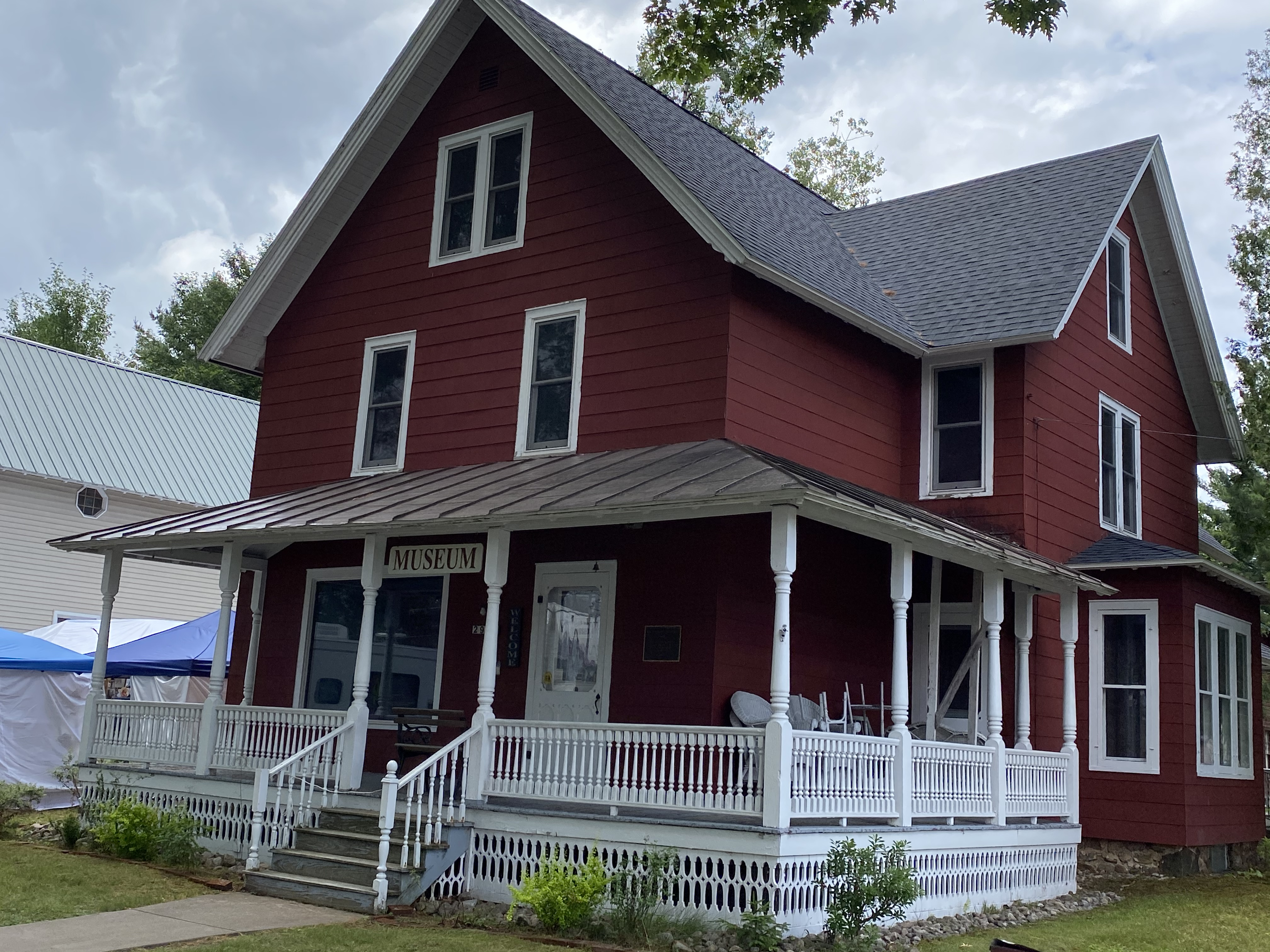

- Location within New York Location within the United States
- Location: 2993 Main St. Old Forge, New York
- Coordinates: 43°42′27″N 74°58′44″W
- Area: less than one acre
- Built: 1899
- Architectural style: Queen Anne
- NRHP reference No.: 06000265
- Added to NRHP: April 12, 2006

Goodsell House is a historic home located at Old Forge in Herkimer County, New York. It was built in 1899 and is a 2 1/2-story, wood-frame vernacular Queen Anne–style house with a gable ell. The main block is over a limestone foundation. Also on the property is a 2 1/2-story carriage house/garage and an ice house. It is operated as a local history museum for the town of Webb.

It was listed on the National Register of Historic Places in 2006.

The Town of Webb Historical Association operates the Goodsell Museum as a museum of local history.
