= Greenfield Mountain =

Mountain in New York, United States

- Location within New York Adirondack Park Location within the United States

Highest point
- Elevation: 1,919 feet (585 m)
- Coordinates: 44°02′53″N 74°54′05″W

Geography
- Location: NNW of Little Rapids, New York, USA
- Topo map: USGS Five Ponds

Greenfield Mountain is a summit in Herkimer County, New York in the Adirondack Mountains. It is located north-northwest of Little Rapids in the Town of Webb. Deer Mountain is located southeast and Partlow Mountain is located west of Greenfield Mountain.
