= Clear Lake (Herkimer County, New York) =

- Location within New York Clear Lake (the United States)
- Location: Herkimer County, New York, United States
- Coordinates: 43°59′18″N 74°55′14″W
- Type: Lake
- Basin countries: United States
- Surface area: 105 acres (0.42 km^{2})
- Average depth: 20 feet (6.1 m)
- Max. depth: 67 feet (20 m)
- Shore length^{1}: 2.3 miles (3.7 km)
- Surface elevation: 2,011 feet (613 m)
- Settlements: Stillwater, New York
- ^{1} Shore length is not a well-defined measure.

Clear Lake is located northeast of Stillwater, New York. The outflow creek flows into Witchhopple Lake. Fish species present in the lake are brown bullhead, and brook trout. Access via trail off Red Horse Trail and Salmon Lake Trail on the south shore. No motors are allowed on Clear Lake.

== Tributaries and locations ==
- Mud Pond – A small pond located south of Clear Lake. The outlet of Clear Lake flows through Mud Pond.
- Summit Mountain – An elevation north of Clear Lake.
- Summit Pond – A small pond located northwest of Clear Lake. Summit Ponds outlet flows into Clear Lake.
