= Fernow Mountain =

Mountain in New York, United States

- Location within New York Location within the United States

Highest point
- Coordinates: 43°42′05″N 74°52′37″W, 43°42′12″N 74°52′28″W

Geography
- Location: E of Old Forge, New York, U.S.
- Topo map: USGS Old Forge

Fernow Mountain is a summit located in Central New York Region of New York located in the Town of Webb in Herkimer County, east of Old Forge.
