= Odor Pond =

Lake in Herkimer County, New York, United States

- Location within New York Location within the United States
- Location: Herkimer County, New York, United States
- Coordinates: 43°57′22″N 74°55′36″W
- Basin countries: United States
- Surface area: 13 acres (0.053 km^{2})
- Average depth: 5 feet (1.5 m)
- Max. depth: 8 feet (2.4 m)
- Shore length^{1}: .7 miles (1.1 km)
- Surface elevation: 1,726 feet (526 m)
- Settlements: Stillwater, New York
- ^{1} Shore length is not a well-defined measure.

Odor Pond is located northeast of Stillwater, New York. The outflow creek flows into Salmon Lake. Fish species present in the pond are brown bullhead, and yellow perch. Access via trail on northwest shore. No motors are allowed on Odor Pond.
