= Bubb Lake =

Lake in Herkimer County, New York, United States

- Location within New York Bubb Lake (the United States)
- Location: Herkimer County, New York, United States
- Coordinates: 43°46′18″N 74°51′08″W
- Basin countries: United States
- Surface area: 52 acres (0.21 km^{2})
- Average depth: 5 feet (1.5 m)
- Max. depth: 14 feet (4.3 m)
- Shore length^{1}: 1.5 miles (2.4 km)
- Surface elevation: 1,814 feet (553 m)
- Settlements: Eagle Bay, New York
- ^{1} Shore length is not a well-defined measure.

Bubb Lake (Bub's Lake) is located west of Eagle Bay, New York. The outlet creek flows into North Branch Moose River. Fish species present in the lake are brook trout, and brown bullhead. There is an access trail that is suitable for equipment to be carried by visitors off Route 28. In the 1800s the lake was known as Bub's Lake. The lake was named after Otis "Bub" Arnold Jr., who lived nearby and hunted for deer there.

== Tributaries and locations ==
- Sis Lake – A small 25 acre lake with a max depth of 7 feet located west of Bubb Lake. The outlet of Sis Lake flows into Bubb Lake. Fish species in Sis Lake include brook trout and brown bullhead.
