= Sis Lake =

- Location of Sis Lake within New York
- Location: Herkimer County, New York
- Coordinates: 43°46′09″N 74°51′36″W
- Type: Lake
- Basin countries: United States
- Surface area: 22 acres (8.9 ha)
- Surface elevation: 1,824 ft (556 m)
- Settlements: Eagle Bay

Sis Lake is a small lake west of Eagle Bay in Herkimer County, New York. It drains east via an unnamed creek which flows into Bubb Lake. It lies on a trail between Bubb and Moss Lake.

The neighboring Bubb Lake, originally "Bub's Lake", was so called after the nickname of a son of local Otis Arnold; it is speculated that "Sis" was named for one of the daughters.

== See also ==
- List of lakes in New York
