= Woodhull Mountain (Herkimer County, New York) =

Mountain in New York

- Location within New York Location within the United States

Highest point
- Elevation: 2,359 feet (719 m)
- Coordinates: 43°37′21″N 74°57′42″W, 43°37′33″N 74°57′42″W

Geography
- Location: ESE of Minnehaha, New York, U.S.
- Topo map(s): USGS Bisby Lakes, Old Forge

Woodhull Mountain is a 2,359-foot-tall (719 m) mountain in the Adirondack Mountains of New York. It is located east-southeast of Minnehaha in the Town of Webb in Herkimer County. In 1916, a 50-foot-tall (15 m) steel fire lookout tower was built on the mountain. The tower ceased fire lookout operations at the end of the 1970 season. The tower still remains and is open to the public with the exception of the tower cab.

== History ==
In September 1911, a wood fire lookout tower was built on the mountain by the Conservation Commission. In 1916, the Conservation Commission built a 50-foot-tall (15 m) Aermotor LL25 steel tower. The tower was of a lighter weight than the 1917 design and had no stairs but only a galvanized steel rung ladder up the exterior to get to the top. A wood ladder was later added to the outside of the tower to make it safer for the observer and public to access to the cab. The Aermotor company later developed a self-supporting staircase for installation in the towers purchased in 1916. This staircase was a tower within a tower and was anchored to the original tower. This self-supporting staircase was installed in 1936 to replace the wood ladder that was previously installed. Due to the increased use of aerial detection, the tower ceased fire lookout operations at the end of the 1970 season. The tower still remains and is open to the public with the exception of the tower cab.
