= Panther Lake (Herkimer County, New York) =

- Location of Panther Lake within New York
- Location: Herkimer County, New York
- Coordinates: 43°40′47″N 74°55′18″W
- Type: Lake
- Basin countries: United States
- Surface area: 44 acres (18 ha)
- Surface elevation: 1,827 ft (557 m)
- Settlements: Old Forge

Panther Lake is a small lake east-southeast of Old Forge in Herkimer County, New York. It drains north via an unnamed creek which flows into Little Moose Lake.

== See also ==
- List of lakes in New York
