= Burnt Mountain =

Burnt Mountain may refer to the following hills and mountains:

- Burnt Mountain (Namibia), a hill with an unusual rock formation in Namibia
- Burnt Mountain (Carbon County, Montana) (2,393 m), a mountain in Carbon County, Montana, US
- Burnt Mountain (Granite County, Montana) (1,940 m), a mountain in Granite County, Montana, US
- Burnt Mountain (Jefferson County, Montana) (1,834 m), a mountain in Jefferson County, Montana, US
- Burnt Mountain (Silver Bow County, Montana) (2,552 m), a mountain in Silver Bow County, Montana, US
- Burnt Mountain (New York), a mountain in Greene County, New York
