= YMCA Camp Gorham =

New York Summer Camp

Camp Gorham
- Interactive map of Camp Gorham
- Location: Eagle Bay, New York
- Coordinates: 43.798676°N 74.859896°W
- Established: 1927
- Website: www.campgorham.org

Camp Gorham is a YMCA summer camp located just north of Eagle Bay, New York in the Adirondack Mountains of New York. The camp is made up of over 1,500 acres (6.1 km^{2}) with a 400-acre (1.6 km^{2}) private lake.

== Background ==
The camp originated as a camp which trapper Bill Dart built for himself in 1879. His original cottage is still on the property. As his business grew, more cottages were built and by 1927 Bill's daughter Emma ran it as a boys' camp. In 1961 the property was donated to the YMCA of Greater Rochester, by Jack and Irene Gorham who purchased the property. It was then renamed Camp Gorham in their honor. The minimum age for attendance is seven and the maximum age is seventeen. There are leadership programs for campers 14 - 17 years old. Counselers are mostly college students.

At the end of each summer Camp Gorham has a family camp. During family camp programs are run by camp staff and family campers themselves help to run events.

Camp Gorham serves 1,000 campers each summer.
