= Moose River Mountain =

Mountain in United States of America

- Location within New York Location within the United States

Highest point
- Elevation: 2,208 feet (673 m)
- Coordinates: 43°42′30″N 75°02′46″W

Geography
- Location: W of Old Forge, Herkimer County, New York, U.S.
- Topo map: USGS Thendara

Moose River Mountain is a 2,208-foot-tall (673 m) mountain in the Adirondack Mountains of New York. It is located west of Old Forge in the town of Webb in Herkimer County. In 1919, a 60-foot-tall (18 m) steel fire lookout tower was built on the mountain. The tower ceased fire lookout operations at the end of the 1970, and was later removed in 1977.

== History ==
In 1919, a 60-foot-tall (18 m) Aermotor LS40 tower was built by the Conservation Commission. The tower replaced a wooden tower that operated for eight years 11 miles (18 km) to the southwest in the town of Lyonsdale in Lewis County. The new location offered a better view according to the Conservation Commission. It's believed that the naming of the mountain came with the moving of the tower. Due to the increased use of aerial detection which was better, the tower ceased fire lookout operations at the end of the 1970. The tower was removed in 1977, because it was deemed excess to the fire lookout operations and was classified as a "non-conforming" structure in the newly established Ha-de-ron-dah Wilderness Area.
