= Evergreen Lake =

Evergreen Lake may refer to the following:

- Evergreen Lake (Illinois)
- Evergreen Lake (Hamilton County, New York)
- Evergreen Lake (Herkimer County, New York)
- Evergreen Lake (Onondaga County, New York)
- Evergreen Lake (Colorado) – lake in Evergreen, Jefferson County
