= Bear Lake (Herkimer County, New York) =

- Location within New York Bear Lake (the United States)
- Location: Herkimer County, New York, United States
- Coordinates: 43°35′55″N 75°03′17″W
- Type: Lake
- Primary outflows: Bear Creek
- Basin countries: United States
- Surface area: 56 acres (0.23 km^{2})
- Average depth: 5 feet (1.5 m)
- Max. depth: 16 feet (4.9 m)
- Shore length^{1}: 1.4 miles (2.3 km)
- Surface elevation: 1,601 feet (488 m)
- Settlements: McKeever, New York
- ^{1} Shore length is not a well-defined measure.

Bear Lake is a lake located by McKeever, New York. Fish species present in the lake are brook trout, white sucker, sunfish, and brown bullhead. There is access via trail off-road east of McKeever.
