= Sitz Mountain =

Mountain in New York, United States

- Location within New York Location within the United States

Highest point
- Elevation: 2,149 feet (655 m)
- Coordinates: 43°59′49″N 75°00′05″W, 43°59′53″N 74°59′56″W

Geography
- Location: NNE of Stillwater, New York, U.S.
- Topo map: USGS Stillwater

Sitz Mountain is a summit located in Central New York Region of New York located in the Town of Webb in Herkimer County, north-northeast of Stillwater.
