= Nicks Lake =

- Location within New York Nicks Lake (the United States)
- Location: Herkimer County, New York, United States
- Coordinates: 43°40′24″N 74°59′33″W
- Type: Lake
- Primary outflows: Nicks Creek
- Basin countries: United States
- Surface area: 209 acres (0.85 km^{2})
- Average depth: 8 feet (2.4 m)
- Max. depth: 17 feet (5.2 m)
- Shore length^{1}: 4.8 miles (7.7 km)
- Surface elevation: 1,706 feet (520 m)
- Islands: 1
- Settlements: Old Forge, New York
- ^{1} Shore length is not a well-defined measure.

Nicks Lake is located south-southwest of Old Forge, New York. The campground at Nicks Lake has 112 campsites, a picnic area, a beach with lifeguards and over 5 miles (8.0 km) of hiking trails. Fish species present in the lake are brook trout, brown trout, white sucker, rainbow trout, yellow perch, and black bullhead. There is a state owned beach launch at the Nick's Lake State Campground. No motors are allowed on Nicks Lake.
