= Mount Electra (New York) =

Mountain in New York, United States

- Location within USA New York rivers

Highest point
- Elevation: 2,260 feet (690 m)
- Coordinates: 43°58′59″N 74°50′41″W

Geography
- Location: NW of Little Rapids, New York, USA
- Topo map: USGS Nehasane Lake

Mount Electra is a 2,260-foot-tall (690 m) mountain in the Adirondack Mountains of New York. It is located north-northeast of Little Rapids in the Town of Webb in Herkimer County. Deer Mountain is located north-northwest of Mount Electra. The mountain was previously known as Rock Lake Mountain. Around 1920, a 60-foot-tall (18 m) steel fire lookout tower was built on the mountain. The tower was dismantled in 1989 and left at the mountain top.

== History ==
Around 1920, the Webb Estate constructed a 60-foot-tall (18 m) Aermotor LS40 steel tower on the mountain. The tower was privately owned but cooperated with the Conservation Commission during periods of high fire danger. The State and Webb family had an agreement that the State would share in the cost of paying the observer but the Webb family would do the hiring. In the late 1970s, the mountain and the tower became a part of the New York State Forest Preserve. The land was added to the Five Ponds Wilderness Area, which classified the tower as a "non-conforming" structure. The tower was dismantled in 1989 and left at the mountain top.
