= Partlow Mountain =

Mountain in New York, United States

- Location within New York Adirondack Park Location within the United States

Highest point
- Elevation: 2,041 feet (622 m)
- Coordinates: 44°02′51″N 74°55′53″W

Geography
- Location: NNW of Little Rapids, New York, USA
- Topo map: USGS Five Ponds

Partlow Mountain is a summit in Herkimer County, New York in the Adirondack Mountains. It is located north-northwest of Little Rapids in the Town of Webb. Greenfield Mountain is located east of Partlow Mountain.
