= Old Forge Dam =

Coordinates: 43°42′45.7″N 074°58′09.7″W

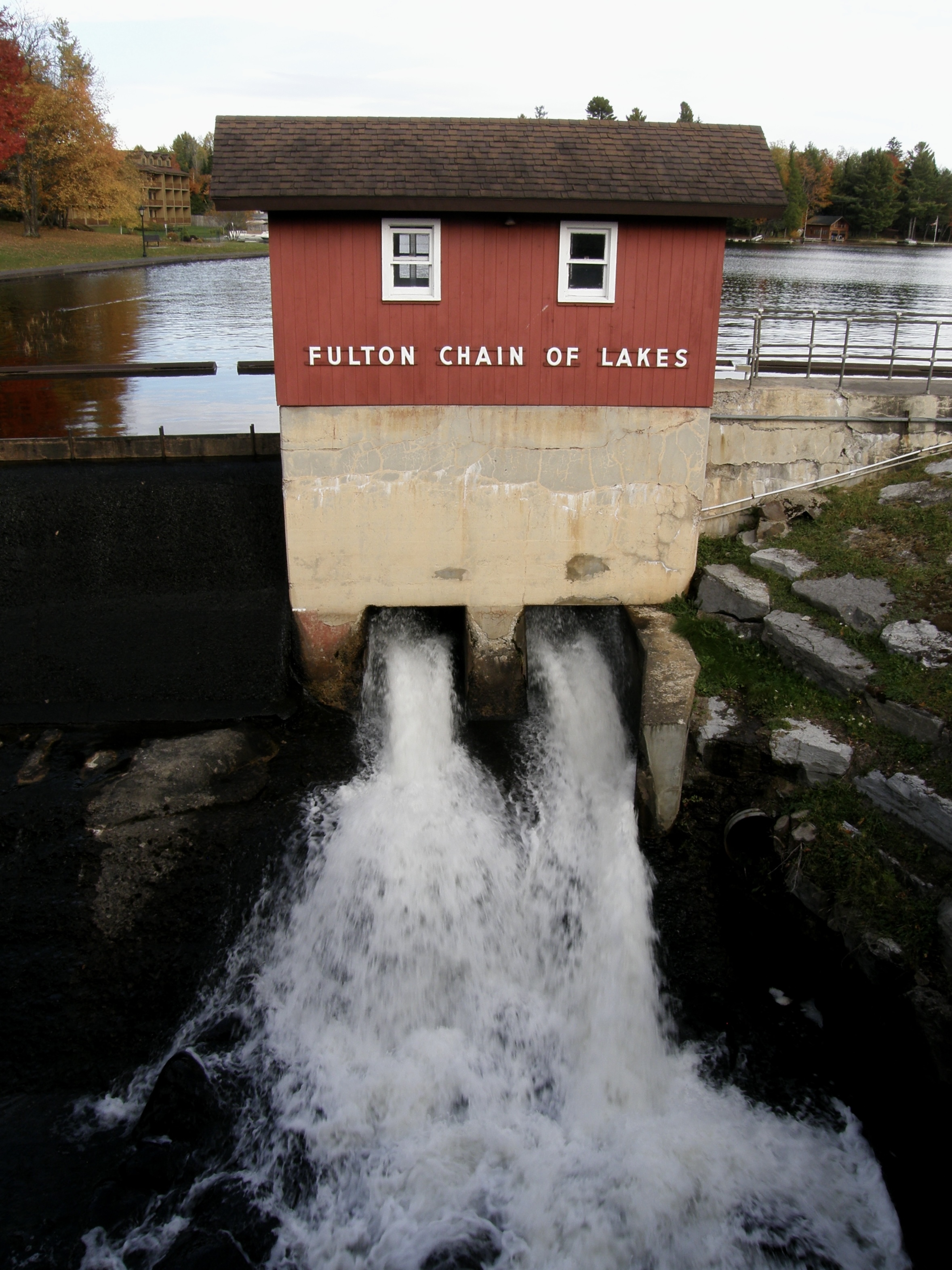
- 1905 postcard
- Interactive map of Old Forge Dam
- Location: Old Forge, New York

The Old Forge Dam is a dam located in Old Forge, New York. It holds water back from the Fulton Chain of Lakes to avoid flooding the Moose River.
