= Middle Settlement Lake =

- Location within New York Middle Settlement Lake (the United States)
- Location: Herkimer County, New York, United States
- Coordinates: 43°41′05″N 75°05′52″W
- Type: Lake
- Basin countries: United States
- Surface area: 42 acres (0.17 km^{2})
- Average depth: 8 feet (2.4 m)
- Max. depth: 36 feet (11 m)
- Shore length^{1}: 1.8 miles (2.9 km)
- Surface elevation: 1,726 feet (526 m)
- Settlements: Thendara, New York
- ^{1} Shore length is not a well-defined measure.

Middle Settlement Lake is located west of Thendara, New York. The outlet creek flows into Middle Branch. Fish species present in the lake are brook trout, and sunfish. There is trail access off Route 28. No motors are allowed on this lake.
