= First Lake (New York) =

Lake in Herkimer County, New York, United States

- Location within New York First Lake (the United States)
- Location: Herkimer County, New York
- Coordinates: 43°42′58″N 74°55′23″W
- Primary inflows: Second Lake
- Primary outflows: Middle Branch Moose River
- Basin countries: United States
- Surface elevation: 1,706 feet (520 m)
- Settlements: Old Forge, New York

First Lake is located in the Town of Webb in Herkimer County, New York, by the hamlet of Old Forge. First Lake is part of the Fulton Chain of Lakes. First Lake is the source of the Middle Branch Moose River.
