= South Pond (Herkimer County, New York) =

- Location within New York South Pond (the United States)
- Location: Herkimer County, New York
- Coordinates: 43°50′47″N 74°52′35″W, 43°50′54″N 74°52′30″W
- Type: Lake
- Basin countries: United States
- Surface area: 40 acres (0.16 km^{2})
- Average depth: 5 feet (1.5 m)
- Max. depth: 31 feet (9.4 m)
- Shore length^{1}: 1.6 miles (2.6 km)
- Surface elevation: 2,047 feet (624 m)
- Islands: 3
- Settlements: Big Moose, New York
- ^{1} Shore length is not a well-defined measure.

South Pond is a lake northeast of Big Moose, New York. The outlet creek flows into Twitchell Creek. Fish species present in the lake are brown trout, brook trout, and lake trout. There is trail access on the south shore. No motors are allowed on this lake.
