= Wolf Pond =

- Location within New York Wolf Pond (the United States)
- Location: Herkimer County, New York, United States
- Coordinates: 44°01′40″N 74°59′04″W
- Type: Lake
- Primary outflows: Wolf Pond Outlet
- Basin countries: United States
- Surface area: 76 acres (0.31 km^{2})
- Average depth: 6 feet (1.8 m)
- Max. depth: 18 feet (5.5 m)
- Shore length^{1}: 2 miles (3.2 km)
- Surface elevation: 1,772 feet (540 m)
- Settlements: Stillwater, New York
- ^{1} Shore length is not a well-defined measure.

Wolf Pond is a lake located north of Stillwater, New York. Fish species present in the lake are brook trout, brown bullhead, and sunfish. There is a trail leading to the lake from Cage Lake on the east shore. No motors are allowed on Wolf Pond.
