= Cage Lake =

Lake in New York, United States

- Location within New York Cage Lake (the United States)
- Location: Herkimer County, New York, United States
- Coordinates: 44°02′59″N 75°00′43″W
- Type: Lake
- Primary outflows: Cage Lake Outlet
- Basin countries: United States
- Surface area: 45 acres (0.18 km^{2})
- Average depth: 7 feet (2.1 m)
- Max. depth: 25 feet (7.6 m)
- Shore length^{1}: 1.6 miles (2.6 km)
- Surface elevation: 1,811 feet (552 m)
- Islands: 1
- Settlements: Stillwater, New York
- ^{1} Shore length is not a well-defined measure.

Cage Lake is a lake located north of Stillwater, New York. Fish present in the lake are brook trout. There is a trail leading to the lake from Buck Pond or Wolf Pond. No motors are allowed on Cage Lake.
