= Louie Ehrensbeck =

American biathlete (1944–2021)

John Robert "Louie" Ehrensbeck (September 19, 1944 – July 17, 2021) was an American biathlon skier who competed in the 1968 Winter Olympics. Ehrensbeck was born in Utica, New York and went to high school in Old Forge, New York, where he competed for his high school ski team. He joined the US Ski team in Alpine in 1961 and the Nordic team in 1963. In 1968 he was on the United States Olympic team in Grenoble, France competing in biathlon. He was part of the Men's 4 × 7.5 kilometers Relay (a new event in 1968) in which the United States finished eighth. He returned to upstate New York where he worked tuning ski equipment and coaching soccer and golf.
