= West Pond (Big Moose, New York) =

Lake in Herkimer County, New York, United States

- Location within New York West Pond (the United States)
- Location: Herkimer County, New York, United States
- Coordinates: 43°48′41″N 74°52′45″W, 43°48′49″N 74°52′29″W
- Basin countries: United States
- Surface area: 39 acres (0.16 km^{2})
- Average depth: 5 feet (1.5 m)
- Max. depth: 17 feet (5.2 m)
- Shore length^{1}: 1.3 miles (2.1 km)
- Surface elevation: 1,906 feet (581 m)
- Settlements: Big Moose, New York
- ^{1} Shore length is not a well-defined measure.

West Pond is located east of Big Moose, New York. The outlet creek flows into Big Moose Lake. Fish species present in the lake are brown trout, brook trout, and brown bullhead. There is carry down access on the north shore.
