= Gull Lake (McKeever, Herkimer County, New York) =

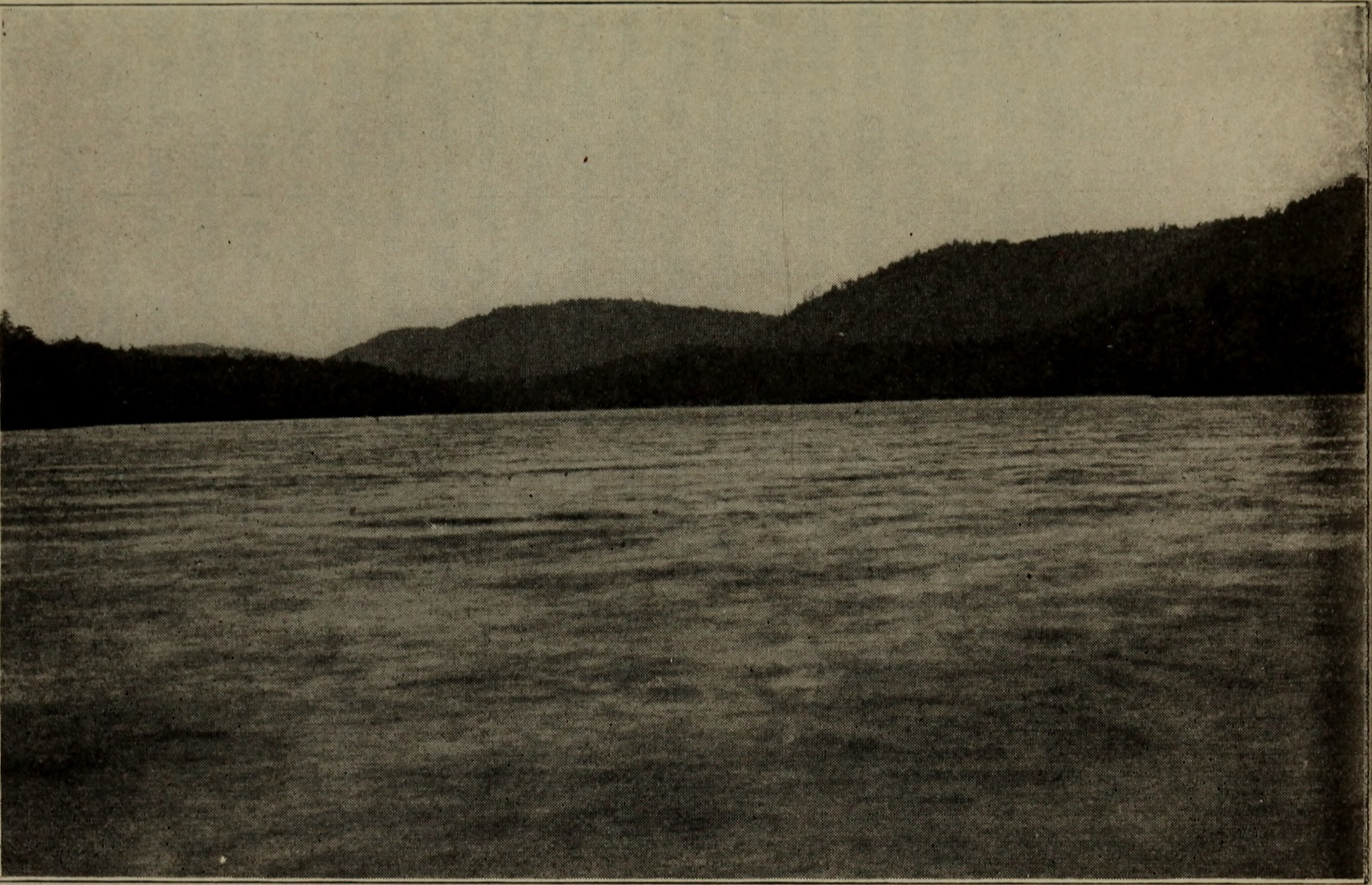
- Gull Lake pictured in The Adirondack Spruce (1898) by Gifford Pinchot

- Location within New York Gull Lake (the United States)
- Location: Herkimer County, New York, United States
- Coordinates: 43°33′11″N 75°03′30″W
- Type: Lake
- Basin countries: United States
- Surface area: 133 acres (0.54 km^{2})
- Average depth: 6 feet (1.8 m)
- Max. depth: 11 feet (3.4 m)
- Shore length^{1}: 3.4 miles (5.5 km)
- Surface elevation: 1,785 feet (544 m)
- Islands: 1
- Settlements: McKeever, New York
- ^{1} Shore length is not a well-defined measure.

Gull Lake is located southeast of McKeever, New York. Fish species present in the lake are yellow perch, and brown bullhead. There is carry-down access off Woodhull Road on the northwest shore.
