= Little Moose Lake =

Lake in Herkimer County, New York

- Location within New York Little Moose Lake (the United States)
- Location: Herkimer County, New York
- Coordinates: 43°41′28″N 74°55′19″W
- Type: Lake
- Basin countries: United States
- Surface area: 692 acres (280 ha)
- Surface elevation: 1,788 ft (545 m)
- Settlements: Old Forge

Little Moose Lake is located east-southeast of Old Forge in Herkimer County, New York. The lake drains south via Little Moose Outlet which flows into the South Branch Moose River. Panther Lake is located south of Little Moose Lake.

== See also ==
- List of lakes in New York
