= Bear Pond (Beaver River, New York) =

- Location within New York Bear Pond (the United States)
- Location: Herkimer County, New York
- Coordinates: 43°57′30″N 75°00′09″W, 43°57′36″N 75°00′00″W
- Type: Lake
- Basin countries: United States
- Surface area: 78 acres (0.32 km^{2})
- Average depth: 20 feet (6.1 m)
- Max. depth: 95 feet (29 m)
- Shore length^{1}: 2.4 miles (3.9 km)
- Surface elevation: 2,054 feet (626 m)
- Settlements: Stillwater, New York
- ^{1} Shore length is not a well-defined measure.

Bear Pond is a lake located northeast of Stillwater, New York. The outflow creek flows into Middle Branch Oswegatchie River. Fish species present in the lake are brown bullhead, and brook trout. Access via trail off Raven Lake Road on the south shore. No motors are allowed on Bear Pond.
