= Stillwater Mountain =

Mountain in New York, United States

- Location within New York Location within the United States

Highest point
- Elevation: 2,244 feet (684 m)
- Coordinates: 43°51′44″N 75°02′01″W

Geography
- Location: S of Stillwater, New York, U.S.
- Topo map: USGS Stillwater Mountain

Stillwater Mountain is a 2,244-foot-tall (684 m) mountain in Adirondack Mountains of New York. It is located south of Stillwater in the town of Webb in Herkimer County. In 1919, a 47-foot-tall (14 m) steel fire lookout tower was built on the mountain. At the end of the 1988 fire lookout season, the tower ceased fire lookout operation. The tower was restored and is open to the public except from the second Tuesday in October through December 20.

== Fire tower ==
In 1912, a wood fire lookout tower was built on the mountain by New York State Conservation Commission, now known as the New York State Department of Environmental Conservation. In 1919, the wood tower was replaced with a 47-foot-tall (14 m) Aermotor model LS-40 steel fire tower. At the end of the 1988 fire lookout season, the tower ceased fire lookout operation. The next year, the tower was officially closed when the Department of Environmental Conservation determined that aerial detection was better for fire lookout purposes. The tower remains on land owned by the Lyme Timber Company, and with an agreement with the Department of Environmental Conservation is open to the public except from the second Tuesday in October through December 20, which is during hunting season. A group, The Friends Of Stillwater Fire Tower, reorganized in 2015 and fully restored the tower by July, 2016. Volunteer stewards staff the tower on weekends during the summer.
