= Moose River (New York) =

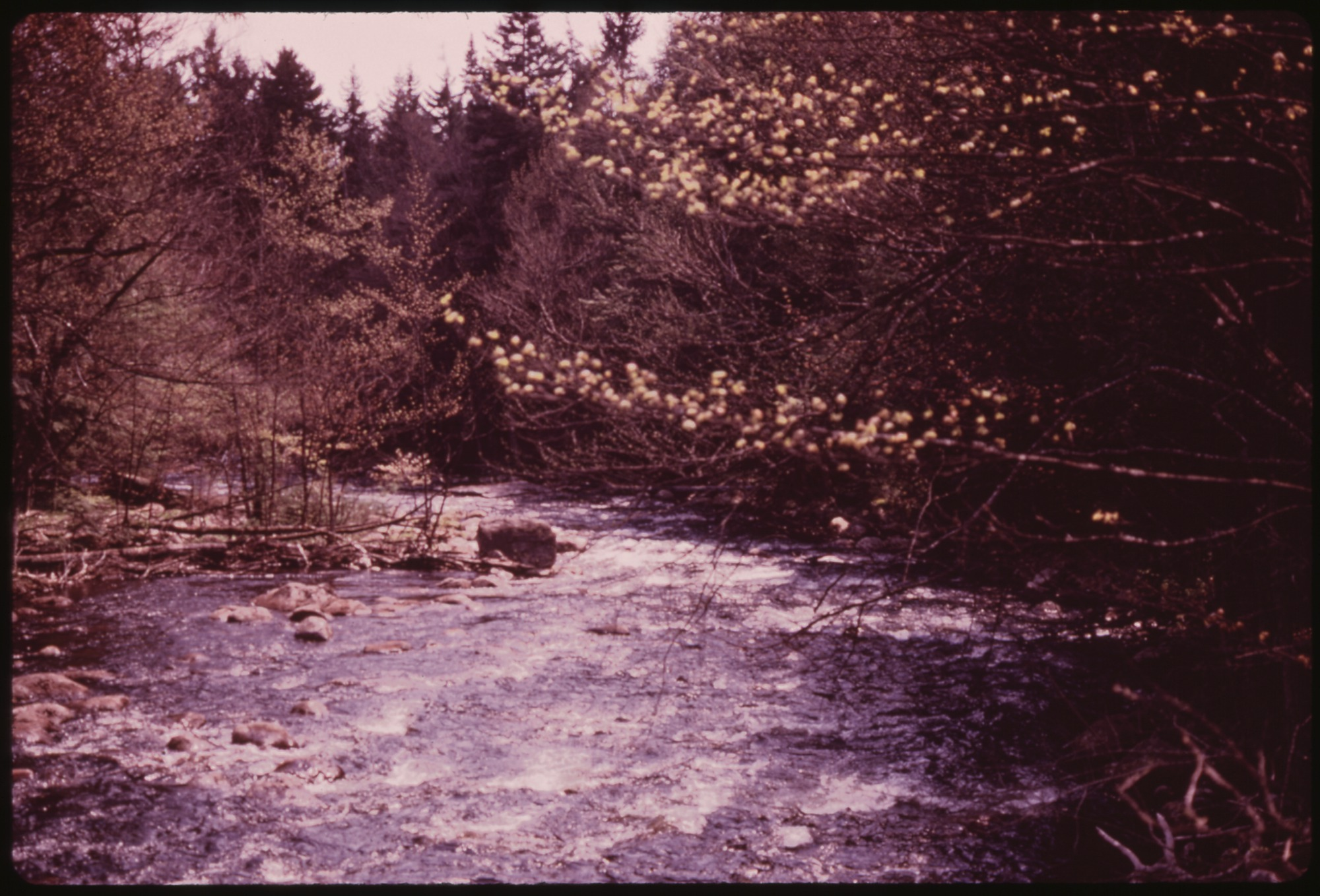
- North Branch Moose River in 1973

Location
- Country: United States
- State: New York

Physical characteristics
- Source: Middle Branch Moose River, South Branch Moose River
  - location: McKeever, New York
- Mouth: Black River
  - location: Lyons Falls, New York
  - coordinates: 43°36′47″N 75°20′12″W
  - elevation: 849 ft (259 m)
- Length: 15.8 m (52 ft)
- Basin size: 429 mi^{2} (1,110 km^{2})

The Moose River is a mountain waterway in upstate New York which consists of three branches: the North Branch, the Middle Branch and the South Branch. The outlet of Big Moose Lake forms the North Branch in northern Herkimer County. The Middle Branch originates at the Fulton Chain Lakes in Old Forge. And the Southern Branch has its headwaters in Little Moose Lake in Hamilton County. The North and Middle branches merge in old Forge, New York, then flow a few miles before merging with the South branch, and then becomes just Moose River. It flows generally westwardly through Herkimer County into Lewis County, reaching its confluence with the Black River in Lyons Falls.

== Geography ==
Owing to its high gradient as it drops out of the mountains, The Moose is a favorite destination for whitewater rafters, kayakers and canoeists. There are three whitewater sections below McKeever with increasing degrees of difficulty. The Middle Moose is a Class II-III section of river from the gaging station in McKeever to Rock Island. The Lower is a Class III-V section from Rock Island to just above Fowlerville Falls, which is run commercially in early spring and includes drops such as Tannery, Froth Hole, Mixmaster and Miller's Falls. The Bottom Moose is a Class V+ section from Fowlerville on. In the Spring and Fall of each year, hundreds of whitewater paddlers descend on the Moose from all parts of the US and eastern Canada. The Bottom Moose (see below), in particular, is a favorite run for paddlers who enjoy Class-V whitewater. This run has several waterfalls, ranging from straightforward and easy to difficult and dangerous.

Also because of its high gradient, there are several hydropower projects along the Moose's course.

== See also ==
- Adirondack League Club v. Sierra Club
- List of New York rivers
- Old Forge
