= Negro Lake (Herkimer County, New York) =

- Location within New York Negro Lake (the United States)
- Location: Herkimer County, New York, United States
- Coordinates: 43°59′37″N 74°52′30″W
- Type: Lake
- Basin countries: United States
- Surface area: 124 acres (0.50 km^{2})
- Average depth: 25 feet (7.6 m)
- Max. depth: 88 feet (27 m)
- Shore length^{1}: 3 miles (4.8 km)
- Surface elevation: 1,847 feet (563 m)
- Islands: 1
- Settlements: Partlow, New York
- ^{1} Shore length is not a well-defined measure.

Negro Lake is a lake located southwest of Partlow, New York. The outlet of the lake flows through an unnamed creek into Witchhopple Lake. Fish species present in Negro Lake are brook trout, white sucker, sunfish, yellow perch, and lake trout. Access by hiking Bushwhack Trail, located on northwest shore of Witchhopple Lake. No motors are allowed on Negro Lake.
