= Evergreen Lake (Herkimer County, New York) =

- Location within New York Evergreen Lake (the United States)
- Location: Herkimer County, New York, United States
- Coordinates: 43°55′06″N 75°00′57″W
- Type: Lake
- Basin countries: United States
- Surface area: 48 acres (0.19 km^{2})
- Average depth: 12 feet (3.7 m)
- Max. depth: 59 feet (18 m)
- Shore length^{1}: 1.7 miles (2.7 km)
- Surface elevation: 2,001 feet (610 m)
- Islands: 3
- Settlements: Stillwater, New York
- ^{1} Shore length is not a well-defined measure.

Evergreen Lake is a lake located northeast of Stillwater, New York. The outflow creek flows into Stillwater Reservoir. Fish species present in the lake are brown bullhead, and brook trout. Access via trail from the north shore of Stillwater Reservoir. No motors are allowed on Evergreen Lake.
