= Independence Lake (New York) =

- Location within New York Independence Lake (the United States)
- Location: Herkimer County, New York, United States
- Coordinates: 43°46′22″N 74°58′41″W
- Type: Lake
- Basin countries: United States
- Surface area: 56 acres (0.23 km^{2})
- Average depth: 9 feet (2.7 m)
- Max. depth: 16 feet (4.9 m)
- Shore length^{1}: 1.6 miles (2.6 km)
- Surface elevation: 1,939 feet (591 m)
- Settlements: Carter Station, New York
- ^{1} Shore length is not a well-defined measure.

Independence Lake is located west of Carter Station, New York. The outlet creek flows into Independence River. Fish species present in the lake are brown bullhead, brook trout, and white sucker. There is trail access off Webb-Inlet Trail.
