= Big Otter Lake =

Lake in New York, United States

- Location within New York Big Otter Lake (the United States)
- Location: Herkimer County, New York, United States
- Coordinates: 43°43′45″N 75°06′26″W
- Primary inflows: North Inlet, Lost Creek, South Inlet
- Primary outflows: Otter Creek
- Basin countries: United States
- Surface area: 245 acres (0.99 km^{2})
- Average depth: 7 feet (2.1 m)
- Max. depth: 26 feet (7.9 m)
- Shore length^{1}: 5.3 miles (8.5 km)
- Surface elevation: 1,585 feet (483 m)
- Islands: 5
- Settlements: Thendara, New York, Old Forge, New York
- ^{1} Shore length is not a well-defined measure.

Big Otter Lake is located west of Thendara, New York. Fish species present in the lake are brook trout, white sucker, sunfish, yellow perch, and black bullhead. Trail access off NY-28 via Big Otter Lake Trail. No motors are allowed on Big Otter Lake.
