= Old Forge Airport =

- IATA: none; ICAO: none; FAA LID: NK26

Summary
- Airport type: Private
- Owner: Adirondack Homes LLC
- Serves: Old Forge, New York
- Elevation AMSL: 1,753 ft (534 m)
- Coordinates: 43°43′31″N 074°58′34″W

Map
- Location within New York Adirondack Park

Runways
Direction	Length		Surface
Direction	ft	m	Surface
9/27	3,200	975	Turf
- Source: Federal Aviation Administration

Old Forge Airport (FAA LID: NK26) is a private use airport located one nautical mile (1.85 km) north of the central business district of Old Forge, a village in Herkimer County, New York, United States.

The Air Route Traffic Control Center for the airport is Boston Center, and Flight service station is the Buffalo Flight Service Station The airport is unattended and is privately owned. To land there, pilots must get permission from the owner, Adirondack Homes LLC .

== Facilities ==
Old Forge Airport covers an area of 18 acres (7.3 ha) at an elevation of 1,753 feet (534 m) above mean sea level. It has one runway designated 9/27 with a turf surface measuring 3,200 by 100 feet (975 x 30 m).
