= North Branch (New York) =

Location
- Country: United States
- State: New York

Physical characteristics
- Source: Little Rock Pond
  - location: Little Rapids, New York
  - coordinates: 43°57′51″N 74°54′18″W
- Mouth: Stillwater Reservoir
  - location: Little Rapids, New York
  - coordinates: 43°56′24″N 74°53′32″W
  - elevation: 1,686 ft (514 m)

South Branch is an American river. It flows out of Little Rock Pond northwest of Little Rapids, New York and flows into Stillwater Reservoir west of Little Rapids.
