= Gun Harbor =

- Location within New York Gun Harbor (the United States)
- Coordinates: 43°55′34″N 74°55′20″W
- Part of: Stillwater Reservoir

Gun Harbor is a bay located on Stillwater Reservoir in Herkimer County, New York. Gun Harbor Brook enters Stillwater Reservoir in Gun Harbor.
