= Moshier Reservoir =

- Location within New York Moshier Reservoir (the United States)
- Location: Herkimer County, New York, United States
- Coordinates: 43°53′32″N 75°05′17″W
- Type: Reservoir
- Primary inflows: Beaver River, Moshier Creek
- Primary outflows: Beaver River
- Basin countries: United States
- Surface area: 307 acres (1.24 km^{2})
- Average depth: 19 feet (5.8 m)
- Max. depth: 75 feet (23 m)
- Shore length^{1}: 6.3 miles (10.1 km)
- Surface elevation: 1,640 feet (500 m)
- Islands: 4
- Settlements: Moshier Falls, New York
- ^{1} Shore length is not a well-defined measure.

Moshier Reservoir is a reservoir located southeast of Moshier Falls, New York. Fish species present in the lake are rock bass, yellow perch, tiger muskie, white sucker, and black bullhead. There is state owned carry down trail access near the inlet.
