= Grass Pond (Thendara, New York) =

- Location of Grass Pond within New York
- Location: Herkimer County, New York
- Coordinates: 43°41′33″N 75°03′41″W
- Type: Lake
- Basin countries: United States
- Surface area: 23 acres (9.3 ha)
- Surface elevation: 1,798 ft (548 m)
- Settlements: Minnehaha

Grass Pond is a small lake north-northeast of Minnehaha in Herkimer County, New York. It drains southwest via an unnamed creek which flows into Cedar Pond.

== See also ==
- List of lakes in New York
