= Witchhopple Lake =

- Location within New York Witchhopple Lake (the United States)
- Location: Herkimer County, New York, United States
- Coordinates: 43°57′54″N 74°55′03″W
- Type: Lake
- Basin countries: United States
- Surface area: 96 acres (0.39 km^{2})
- Max. depth: 29 feet (8.8 m)
- Shore length^{1}: 3 miles (4.8 km)
- Surface elevation: 1,759 feet (536 m)
- Settlements: Keepawa, New York
- ^{1} Shore length is not a well-defined measure.

Witchhopple Lake is located near Keepawa, New York. The outlet flows into Salmon Lake and then from there into Stillwater Reservoir. Fish species present in Witchhopple Lake are brook trout, white sucker, sunfish, yellow perch, and splake. Access by trail from the north shore of Stillwater Reservoir. No motors are allowed on Witchhopple Lake. There is a trail that goes from Witchhopple Lake to Negro Lake called Bushwhack Trail.
