= Middle Branch Lake =

- Location within New York Middle Branch Lake (the United States)
- Location: Herkimer County, New York, United States
- Coordinates: 43°42′06″N 75°05′54″W
- Type: Lake
- Primary outflows: Middle Branch
- Basin countries: United States
- Surface area: 49 acres (0.20 km^{2})
- Average depth: 8 feet (2.4 m)
- Max. depth: 17 feet (5.2 m)
- Shore length^{1}: 1.6 miles (2.6 km)
- Surface elevation: 1,627 feet (496 m)
- Settlements: Thendara, New York
- ^{1} Shore length is not a well-defined measure.

Middle Branch Lake is located west of Thendara, New York. The outlet is Middle Branch. Fish species present in the lake are sunfish, brook trout, and white sucker. There trail access off Route 28 on north shore via Big Otter Lake Trail. No motors are allowed on this lake.
