= McKeever, New York =

- Hamlet
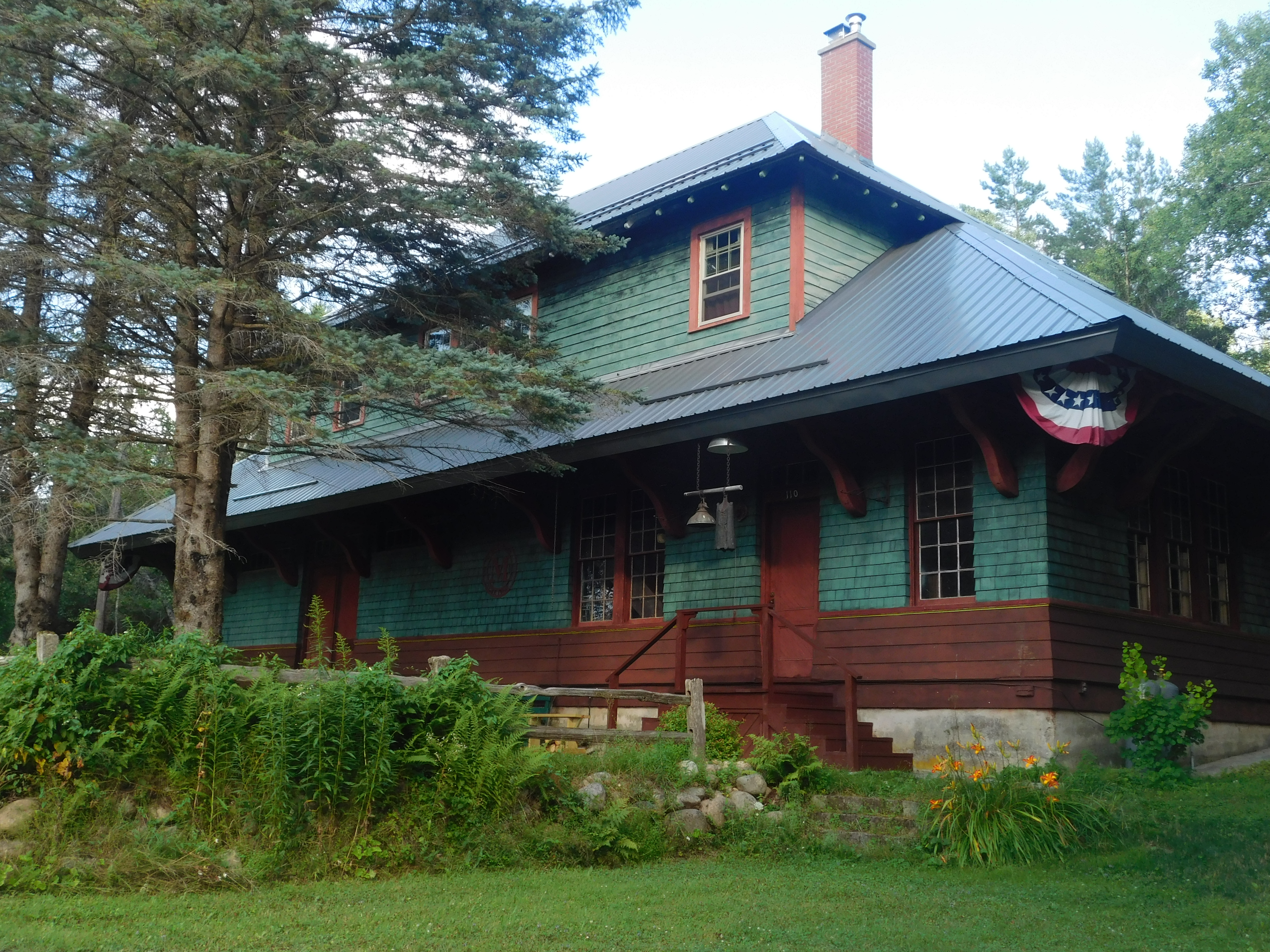
- The former New York Central Railroad station in McKeever in August 2022.

- Location within New York Location within the United States
- Coordinates: 43°36′43″N 75°05′56″W
- State: New York
- County: Herkimer
- Town: Webb
- Elevation: 465 m (1,526 ft)
- Time zone: UTC-5 (Eastern (EST))
  - Summer (DST): UTC-4 (EDT)

McKeever is a hamlet located in the Town of Webb in Herkimer County, New York, United States. The Moose River flows west through the hamlet.
