= Grass Pond (Stillwater Mountain, New York) =

- Location of Grass Pond within New York
- Location: Herkimer County, New York
- Coordinates: 43°47′20″N 75°04′27″W
- Type: Lake
- Basin countries: United States
- Surface area: 40 acres (16 ha)
- Surface elevation: 1,762 ft (537 m)
- Islands: 2
- Settlements: Stillwater

Grass Pond is a small lake south-southwest of Stillwater in Herkimer County, New York. It drains south via an unnamed creek which flows into the Independence River.

== See also ==
- List of lakes in New York
