= McCauley Mountain (New York) =

Mountain in New York, United States

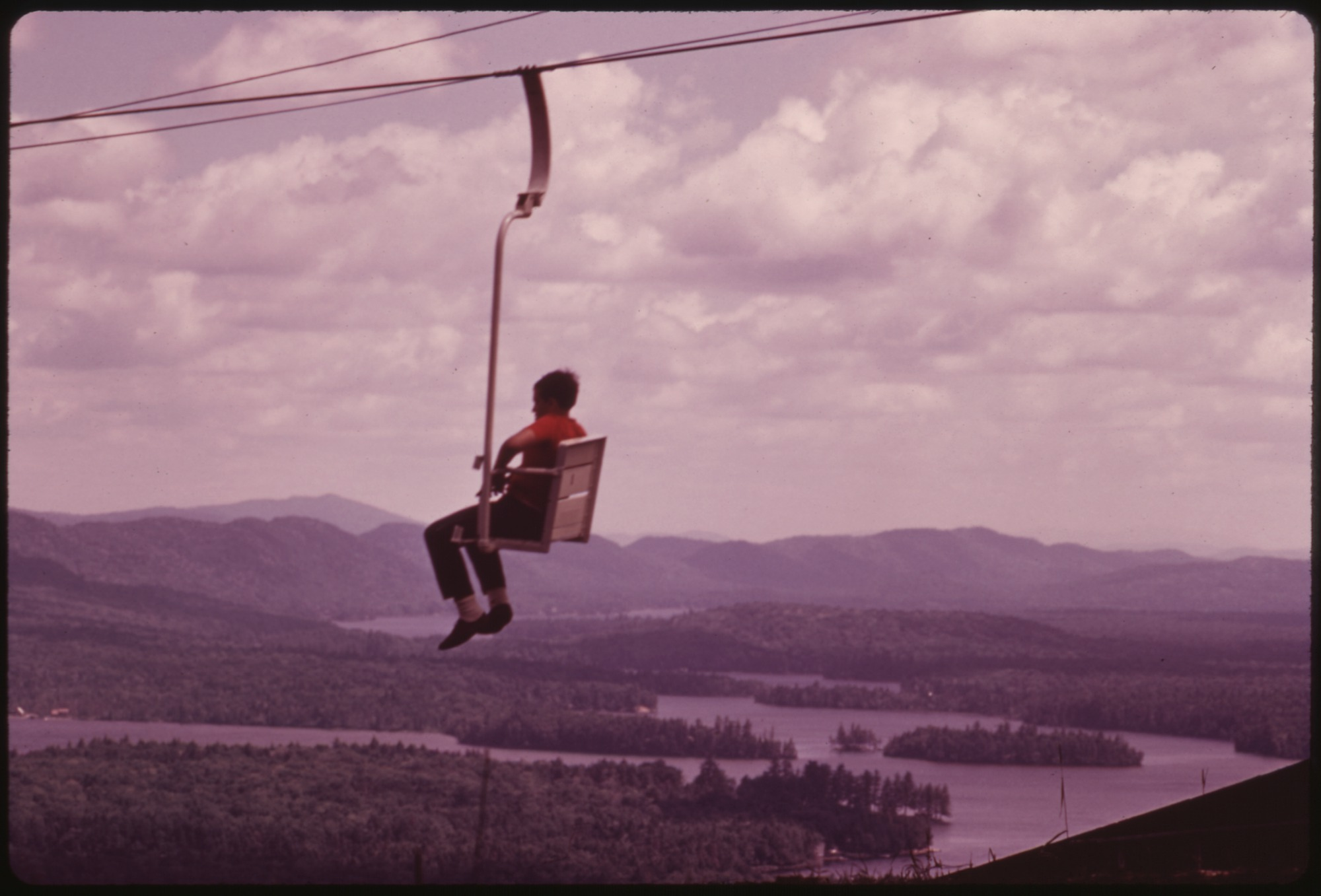
- McCauley Mountain chair lift, 1973. Photo by Anne LaBastille.

Highest point
- Elevation: 2,280 feet (690 m)
- Coordinates: 43°41′33″N 74°57′41″W

Geography
- Location within New York Adirondack Park Location within the United States
- Location: SE of Old Forge, New York, USA
- Topo map: USGS Old Forge

McCauley Mountain is a summit and ski resort in the Town of Webb, Herkimer County, New York. It is located just outside the hamlet of Old Forge, in the south-western area of the Adirondack Mountains.

Opened in 1958, it was the hometown hill of Olympic skier Hank Kashiwa.

The summit of McCauley Mountain is at an elevation of 2,280 feet (690 m). The hill features a 633-foot (193 m) vertical drop, 21 ski trails of between three and 5,000 feet (1,500 m), two T-bar tows, two rope tows, and one double chairlift.
