= Middle Branch Moose River =

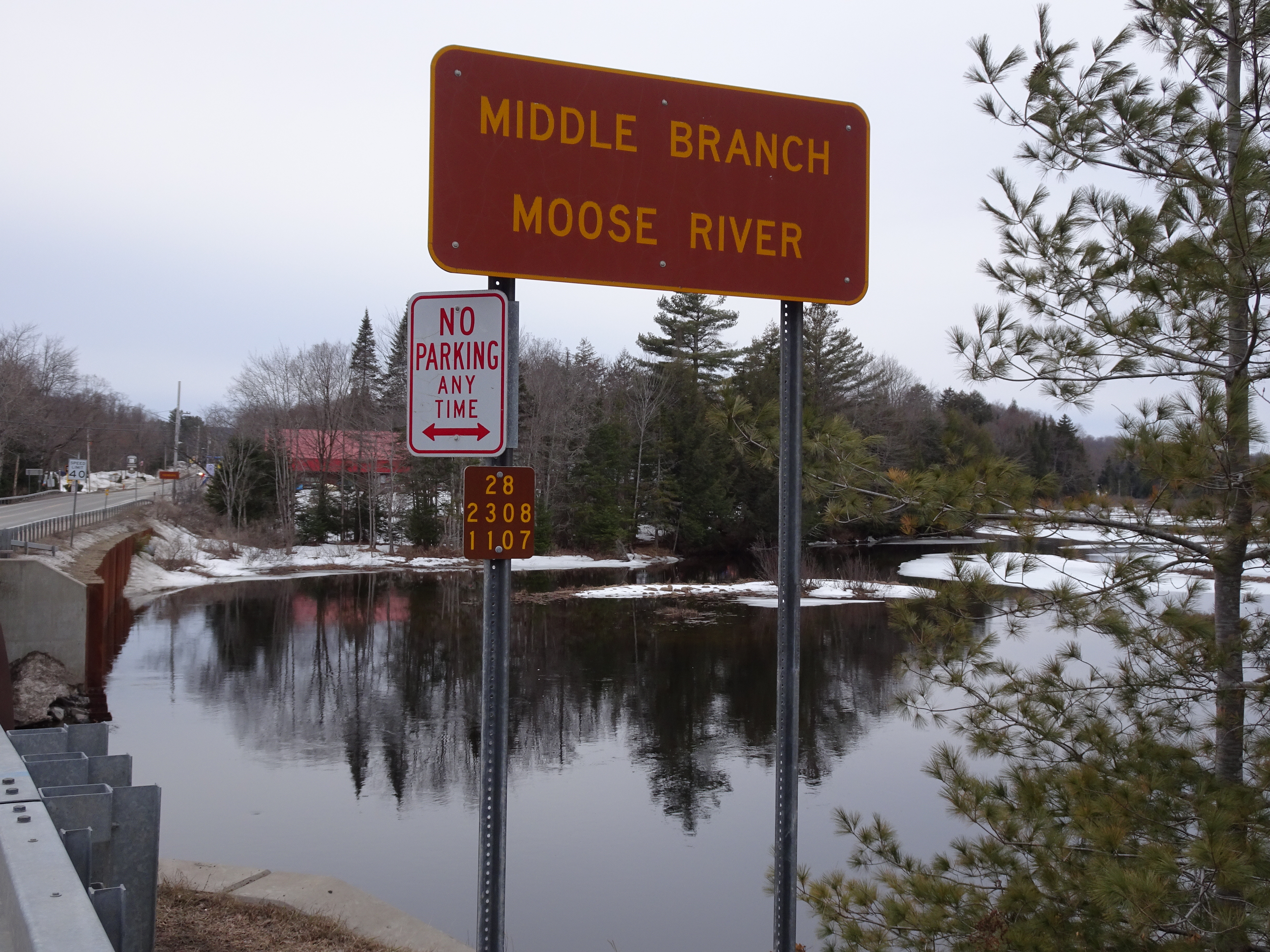
- Crossing Route 28 in Old Forge

- Location of the mouth within New York Middle Branch Moose River (the United States)

Location
- Country: United States
- State: New York

Physical characteristics
- Source: First Lake
  - location: Old Forge, New York
  - coordinates: 43°42′46″N 74°58′12″W
  - elevation: 1,706 feet (520 m)
- Mouth: Moose River
  - location: Mckeever, New York
  - coordinates: 43°37′16″N 75°04′39″W
  - elevation: 1,512 ft (461 m)
- Basin size: 151 sq mi (390 km^{2})

Basin features
- Tributaries
  - left: Nelson Lake
  - right: North Branch Moose River

Middle Branch Moose River starts in Old Forge, New York at the outlet of First Lake and flows into the Moose River in Mckeever, New York.
