= Lake Kan-ac-to =

- Location of Lake Kan-ac-to within New York
- Location: Herkimer County, New York
- Coordinates: 43°45′06″N 74°55′35″W
- Type: Lake
- Basin countries: United States
- Surface area: 11 acres (4.5 ha)
- Surface elevation: 1,742 ft (531 m)
- Settlements: Old Forge

Lake Kan-ac-to is a small lake northeast of Old Forge in Herkimer County, New York.

== See also ==
- List of lakes in New York
