= Salmon Lake (New York) =

Lake in Herkimer County, New York, United States

- Location within New York Salmon Lake (the United States)
- Location: Herkimer County, New York, United States
- Coordinates: 43°56′47″N 74°56′25″W
- Basin countries: United States
- Surface area: 110 acres (0.45 km^{2})
- Average depth: 24 feet (7.3 m)
- Max. depth: 50 feet (15 m)
- Shore length^{1}: 3.1 miles (5.0 km)
- Surface elevation: 1,722 feet (525 m)
- Settlements: Brandreth, New York
- ^{1} Shore length is not a well-defined measure.

Salmon Lake is located west of Brandreth, New York. The outlet of the lake flows through an unnamed creek into Trout Pond. Fish species present in the lake are brook trout, brown trout, sunfish, black bullhead, yellow perch, and lake trout. Access by hiking a trail from Trout Pond off Stillwater Reservoir. No motors are allowed on Salmon Lake.
