= Stillwater Reservoir =

Man made lake in New York, United States

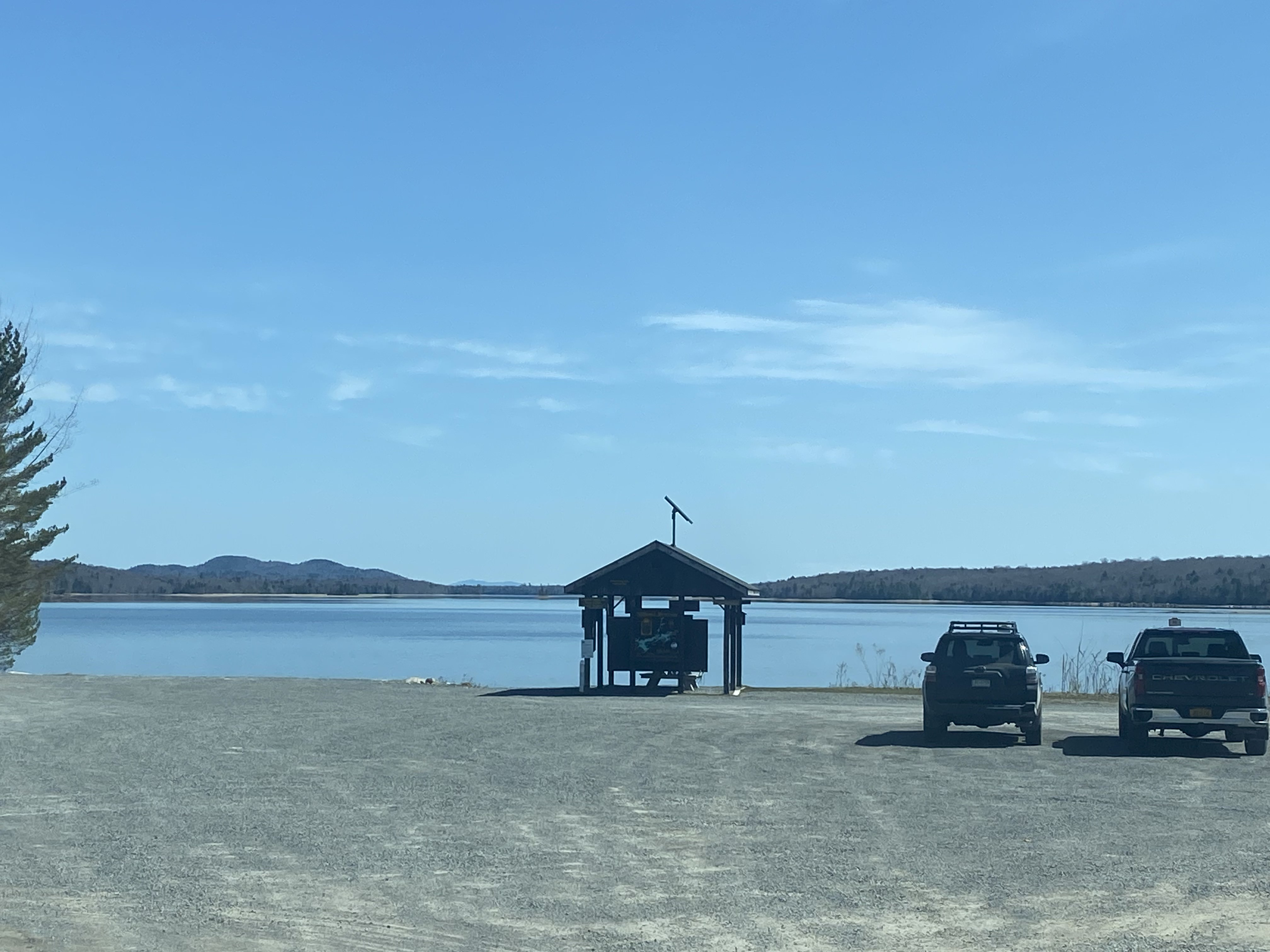
- Stillwater Reservoir as seen from the hamlet of Stillwater.

- Location within New York
- Location: Town of Webb, Herkimer County, New York, United States
- Coordinates: 43°54′45″N 74°57′16″W, 43°53′26″N 75°01′21″W
- Type: Reservoir
- Primary inflows: Beaver River, North Branch, Twitchell Creek, Gun Harbor Brook, West Branch Beaver River, South Branch
- Primary outflows: Beaver River
- Basin countries: United States
- Surface area: 6,233 acres (25.22 km^{2})
- Max. depth: 62 feet (19 m)
- Shore length^{1}: 75 miles (121 km)
- Surface elevation: 1,680 feet (510 m)
- Islands: 97
- Settlements: Beaver River, New York, Stillwater, New York
- ^{1} Shore length is not a well-defined measure.

Stillwater Reservoir is a man-made lake located by Beaver River, New York within the Western Adirondacks. The lake has a large amount of recreational uses including camping, canoeing, boating, fishing, hunting, snowmobiling, and cross-country skiing. The lake has undeveloped edges with remote camping on both the islands and the shoreline. Camping permits and lake information may be obtained from the hamlet of Stillwater at the Forest Ranger Headquarters. Fish species present in the reservoir are smallmouth bass, splake, rock bass, yellow perch, sunfish and brown trout. There is a state owned hard surface ramp on Stillwater Road, 28 miles east of Lowville, New York. the record low temperature for the state of New York of −52 °F (−47 °C) took place at Stillwater Reservoir, and was later tied by Old Forge on February 17, 1979.

== Climate ==
Stillwater Reservoir recorded the coldest temperature in New York State on February 9, 1934 at -52°F (-47°C). This record was tied when Old Forge recorded the same temperature on February 18, 1979.

Climate data for Stillwater Reservoir, New York, 1991–2020 normals, extremes 1926-2020: 1690ft (515m)
Month	Jan	Feb	Mar	Apr	May	Jun	Jul	Aug	Sep	Oct	Nov	Dec	Year
Record high °F (°C)	61 (16)	61 (16)	77 (25)	86 (30)	90 (32)	93 (34)	97 (36)	93 (34)	93 (34)	83 (28)	73 (23)	65 (18)	97 (36)
Mean maximum °F (°C)	48 (9)	47 (8)	57 (14)	72 (22)	81 (27)	84 (29)	84 (29)	83 (28)	80 (27)	73 (23)	61 (16)	51 (11)	86 (30)
Mean daily maximum °F (°C)	26.1 (−3.3)	28.4 (−2.0)	36.5 (2.5)	49.9 (9.9)	63.8 (17.7)	71.4 (21.9)	75.0 (23.9)	73.9 (23.3)	67.1 (19.5)	54.7 (12.6)	42.0 (5.6)	31.6 (−0.2)	51.7 (11.0)
Daily mean °F (°C)	14.9 (−9.5)	16.3 (−8.7)	24.9 (−3.9)	38.7 (3.7)	52.7 (11.5)	61.0 (16.1)	65.0 (18.3)	64.0 (17.8)	56.9 (13.8)	45.1 (7.3)	33.5 (0.8)	22.2 (−5.4)	41.3 (5.2)
Mean daily minimum °F (°C)	3.8 (−15.7)	4.2 (−15.4)	13.2 (−10.4)	27.5 (−2.5)	41.6 (5.3)	50.6 (10.3)	55.0 (12.8)	54.0 (12.2)	46.6 (8.1)	35.4 (1.9)	25.0 (−3.9)	12.8 (−10.7)	30.8 (−0.7)
Mean minimum °F (°C)	−26 (−32)	−21 (−29)	−12 (−24)	12 (−11)	28 (−2)	37 (3)	46 (8)	44 (7)	34 (1)	23 (−5)	7 (−14)	−14 (−26)	−29 (−34)
Record low °F (°C)	−42 (−41)	−52 (−47)	−34 (−37)	−12 (−24)	17 (−8)	27 (−3)	37 (3)	29 (−2)	21 (−6)	6 (−14)	−20 (−29)	−46 (−43)	−52 (−47)
Average precipitation inches (mm)	3.71 (94)	2.83 (72)	3.19 (81)	3.79 (96)	4.40 (112)	4.55 (116)	5.09 (129)	4.61 (117)	4.32 (110)	5.48 (139)	4.04 (103)	4.22 (107)	50.23 (1,276)
Average snowfall inches (cm)	42.2 (107)	31.5 (80)	21.8 (55)	5.8 (15)	0.2 (0.51)	trace	trace	trace	trace	1.4 (3.6)	13.1 (33)	33.7 (86)	149.7 (380.11)
Source 1: NOAA
Source 2: XMACIS (snowfall, temp records & monthly max/mins)

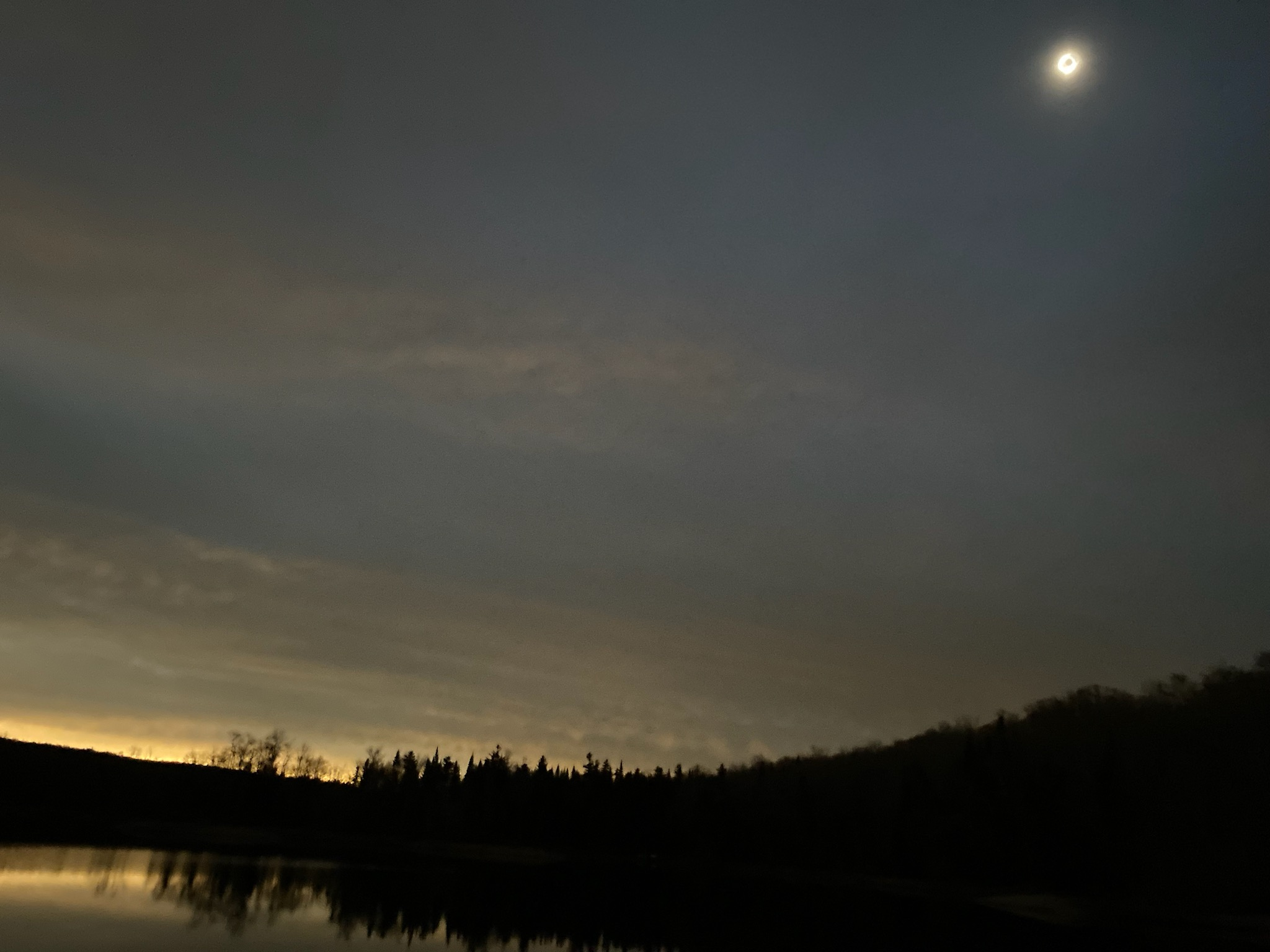
A total solar eclipse from the northern side of Stillwater Reservoir.

== Islands and locations ==
- Bay Island – Located off Bay Island Point.
- Big Burnt Lake – A lake connected to Stillwater Reservoir located northwest of the hamlet of Beaver River.
- Big Island – Located by Grassy Point.
- Canfield Island
- Chicken Island
- Fly Island – Located by Gun Harbor.
- Fox Island – Located near the outlet of Halfway Brook. Has a primitive campsite on the island.
- Georges Island – Located off the Tower Trail campsite point.
- Grassy Island – Located by Grassy Point.
- Gull Island
- Gull Rock
- Gun Harbor– A bay located north-northeast of the hamlet of Beaver River.
- Hotel Island
- Long Island – Has two primitive campsites on each end of the island.
- Loon Island – Located in the Loon Lake section of the reservoir. Has a primitive campsite on the island.
- Melody Island – Located near Devil's Hole. Has a primitive campsite on the island.
- Needle Island – Located in the Big Burnt Lake section of the reservoir
- Nest Island – Located by Round Island.
- North Island – Located by Gun Harbor.
- Picnic Island – Located off Picnic Point. Has two primitive campsites on the island.
- Picnic Point West Island – East of picnic island. Has a primitive campsite on the island.
- Rapshaw Island
- Rock Island – Located by the inlet of Twitchell Creek.
- Round Island – Located off Little Burnt Point.
- Sand Island – Located off Dead Man's Curve.
- South Island – Located south of the Wild Forest.
- Spruce Island – Located off Hat Point. Has a primitive campsite on the island.
- State Island
- Trout Pond – A bay located north of Big Burnt Lake bay. It is where the outlet of Salmon Lake enters the reservoir.
- Twin Pine Island – Located off The Notch Point. Has a primitive campsite on the island.
- Van Sickle Island – Located by the outlet of the reservoir.
- Island #2 – Located by the inlet of Twitchell Creek. Has two primitive campsites on the island.
- Island #16 – Located by Little Burnt Point, and has a primitive campsite on the island.
- Island #26 – Has a primitive campsite on the island.
- Island #33 – Located in the Big Burnt Lake section of the reservoir. Has a primitive campsite on the island.
