= Beaver River, New York =

- Hamlet
- Location in New York
- Coordinates: 43°54′13″N 74°54′36″W
- Country: United States
- State: New York
- County: Herkimer
- Town: Webb

Beaver River is a hamlet that is six-tenths of a mile square, at the east end of Stillwater Reservoir, in the town of Webb in Herkimer County, New York, United States. The hamlet is surrounded by the Adirondack Park. The hamlet has a year-round population of eight that increases during the summer, as many people have camps in this wilderness area. There are 125 private properties and three commercial businesses. No roads lead to the hamlet; it is accessible only by hiking, small self-propelled private track speeder or boat in the summer and by snowmobile, snowshoes or cross country skis in the winter. There is no electrical service. The town is named for the Beaver River, which was impounded to form the Stillwater Reservoir. The Beaver River is a west-flowing tributary of the Black River and part of the Lake Ontario watershed. The former New York Central Railroad right of way, on the National Register of Historic Places, passes through the hamlet; an existing bunkhouse is a part of the historic property. The Adirondack Railroad will resume tourist passenger service from Utica to Tupper Lake, via Beaver River, in 2023: 42 years since the last passenger train ran on its trackage. The last New York Central Railroad passenger train left Beaver River on April 24, 1965.

== History ==
Beaver River was created in 1892 by railroad builder Dr. William Seward Webb as a stop on his newly completed Adirondack and St. Lawrence Railway, which became the Mohawk and Malone Railway and ultimately, the New York Central. Webb owned some 200,000 acres (810 km^{2}) in the area, which was popular with hunters and fishermen. Extensive logging began at the turn of the century. In 1902, the Norridgewock Hotel was built, which became the social hub of the community. A school house was built in 1912 by early settler Ben Bullock; the school continued to operate until 1965.

== See also ==
- List of car-free places

== Sources ==
- Bill Donnelly, "Beaver River History", from A Short History of Beaver River, Town of Webb Historical Association, Old Forge, NY
- Beaver River Property Owners Association
