= Salmon Lake =

Lake of Ontario, Canada

- Location within Ontario
- Location: Ontario
- Coordinates: 44.8172652°N 78.4440347°W
- Basin countries: Canada
- Surface area: 172 hectares (430 acres)
- Average depth: 11.3 metres (37 ft)
- Max. depth: 34.4 metres (113 ft)
- Shore length^{1}: 10.9 kilometres (6.8 mi)
- Surface elevation: 322 metres (1,056 ft)
- Islands: 2+
- ^{1} Shore length is not a well-defined measure.

Salmon Lake is a lake of Ontario, Canada. It is located between Queen Elizabeth II Wildlands Provincial Park and the Kawartha Highlands Provincial Park.

== See also ==
- List of lakes in Ontario
