= Eagle Bay, New York =

Hamlet and CDP in Upstate New York, United States

- Hamlet and CDP
- Location within New York
- Coordinates: 43°46′07″N 74°49′01″W
- Country: United States
- State: New York
- County: Herkimer
- Town: Webb
- Time zone: UTC−5 (EST)
  - Summer (DST): UTC−4 (EDT)
- ZIP Code: 13331
- Area code: 315

Eagle Bay is a hamlet (and census-designated place) on Route 28 in the town of Webb in Herkimer County, New York, United States. Eagle Bay is on the border of Herkimer and Hamilton counties, and borders Fourth Lake.

As of the 2020 census, Eagle Bay had a population of 54.

== Nearby communities ==
- Big Moose
- Inlet
- Old Forge
