= North Branch Moose River =

Location
- Country: United States
- State: New York

Physical characteristics
- Source: Big Moose Lake
- Mouth: Middle Branch Moose River
  - location: Old Forge, New York
  - coordinates: 43°42′17″N 74°59′09″W
  - elevation: 1,693 ft (516 m)
- Basin size: 77.8 mi^{2} (202 km^{2})

North Branch Moose River starts at Big Moose Lake and flows into Middle Branch Moose River in Old Forge, New York.
