= Minnehaha, New York =

- Hamlet
- Location within New York Location within the United States
- Coordinates: 43°39′42″N 75°04′05″W
- Country: United States
- State: New York
- County: Herkimer
- Town: Webb
- Elevation: 1,683 ft (513 m)
- Time zone: UTC-5 (Eastern (EST))
  - Summer (DST): UTC-4 (EDT)

Minnehaha is a hamlet located in the Town of Webb in Herkimer County, New York, United States in the western part of the Adirondacks.
