= Webb, New York =

- Town
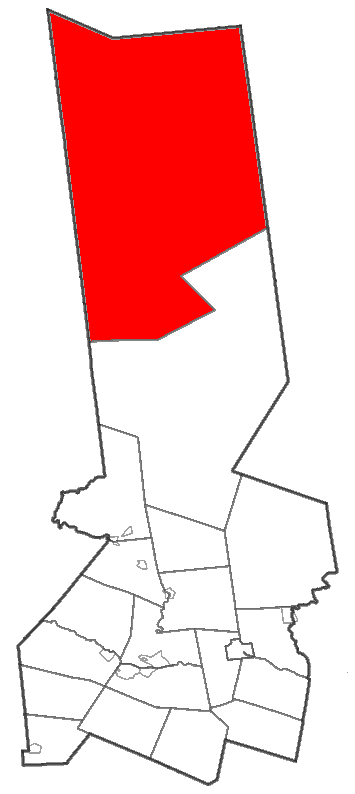
- Location within Herkimer County

- Location within New York Location within the United States
- Coordinates: 43°46′4″N 74°56′41″W
- Country: United States
- State: New York
- County: Herkimer

Government
  - Type: Town Council
  - Town Supervisor: Bonnie Baker
  - Town Council: Michael Ross, Kyle Lindsay, Ben Hannah, and Tom Greco

Area
  - Total: 484.35 sq mi (1,254.45 km^{2})
  - Land: 452.34 sq mi (1,171.56 km^{2})
  - Water: 32.00 sq mi (82.89 km^{2})
- Elevation: 1,732 ft (528 m)

Population (2020)
  - Total: 1,797
- Time zone: UTC-5 (Eastern (EST))
  - Summer (DST): UTC-4 (EDT)
- ZIP Codes: 13331 (Eagle Bay); 13420 (Old Forge); 13472 (Thendara); 13338 (Forestport); 13367 (Lowville)
- FIPS code: 36-043-78927
- GNIS feature ID: 0979613
- Website: www.townofwebbny.gov

Webb (sometimes referred to as Webb Town) is the northernmost town in Herkimer County, New York, United States. As of the 2020 Census it had a population of 1,797.

It is named after William Seward Webb, president of the Raquette Lake Transportation Company, the Fulton Chain Railway Company, Fulton Navigation Company, and the Mohawk and Malone Railway. The railroads in Webb were instrumental in opening the Adirondacks to the tourism rush of the mid-to-late 19th century. The Adirondack Railroad resumed tourist passenger service through the town in 2022.

== History ==
Attempts were made to settle Webb circa 1800 and 1811, but both efforts failed due to extreme climate, harsh weather and poor land for farming. The first permanent settlers, Otis Arnold and family, arrived in approximately 1837 and began their try at the land. The Arnolds ultimately succeeded in cultivating and selling hay feed, vegetables, milk and fruit. Eventually, map makers and guidebooks made note of the settlement. The Arnolds opened their house as a hotel of sorts, and the area became known for its beautiful rivers, lakes and mountains.

In 1836, the town of Wilmurt was formed from parts of the towns of Ohio and Russia. Only the south part of Wilmurt was heavily settled. Webb was formed from the northern part of the now-defunct town of Wilmurt in 1896. Part of Wilmurt was returned to the town of Ohio.

When Dr. William Seward Webb's Mohawk and Malone Railway reached the town in 1892, it precipitated twenty years of prosperity from lumbering and tourism.

== Geography ==
According to the United States Census Bureau, the town has a total area of 484.3 square miles (1,254.3 km^{2}), of which 452.3 square miles (1,171.4 km^{2}) are land and 32.0 square miles (82.9 km^{2}), or 6.61%, are water. Webb has the most land area of any town in New York State, although Brookhaven covers a larger area when including water.

Webb is in the Adirondack Park. One end of the Fulton Chain Lakes is located in the town. New York State Route 28 crosses the southern part of the town from west to east, passing through the communities of Old Forge and Thendara.

== Demographics ==
Historical population
Census	Pop.	Note	%±
1900	920		—
1910	1,250		35.9%
1920	1,357		8.6%
1930	1,785		31.5%
1940	1,373		−23.1%
1950	1,308		−4.7%
1960	1,562		19.4%
1970	1,616		3.5%
1980	1,701		5.3%
1990	1,637		−3.8%
2000	1,912		16.8%
2010	1,807		−5.5%
2020	1,797		−0.6%
U.S. Decennial Census

All data in this section is from the 2020 United States census. As of 2020, there were 1,797 people, 685 households, and 659 families residing in the town. The racial makeup of the town was 94.37% White, 0.38% African American, 0.44% Native American, 0.38% Asian, 0.44% from other races, and 3.95% from two or more races. Hispanic or Latino of any race were 1.44% of the population.

There were 685 households, out of which 12% had children under the age of 18 living with them, 80.3% were married couples living together, and 6.4% had a female householder with no husband present. The average family size was 2.27.

In the town, the population was spread out, with 10.01% under the age of 18, 1.5% from 18 to 24, 22.59% from 25 to 44, 21.8% from 45 to 64, and 33.4% who were 65 years of age or older. The median age was 56.5 years.

The median income for a household in the town was $102,873, and the median income for a family was $105,227. About 3.7% of the population were below the poverty line.

== Settlements and geographical features ==
=== Settlements ===
- Big Moose – A hamlet on County Route 1 west of Big Moose Lake.
- Bisby Lodge – A historic location.
- Brandreth – A location near the eastern town border.
- Beaver River – A location the south side of Stillwater Reservoir.
- Camp Rondaxe – A location near the junction of Routes NY-28 and 93.
- Carter Station – A historic location.
- Eagle Bay – A hamlet on the northern side of Fourth Lake at the junction of Routes 1 and 28.
- Keepawa – A hamlet by the eastern town line.
- Little Rapids – A location at the eastern end of the Stillwater Reservoir.
- McKeever – A hamlet on Route 28 at the western town border.
- Minnehaha – A hamlet near the western side of the town, east of McKeever on Route 28.
- Moshier Falls – A hamlet on the western border of the town with Lewis County.
- Mountain Lodge – A location on Route 118 southeast of Old Forge.
- Old Forge – A hamlet on Route 28. Old Forge often records the lowest winter temperatures in New York. Old Forge is the principal community in the region, and, along with the adjacent community Thendara, forms an extensive business district.
- Stillwater – A hamlet by Stillwater Reservoir.
- Thendara – A hamlet on Route 28 immediately to the west of Old Forge.
- Woods Lake – A hamlet in the northeastern part of the town.

=== Geographical features ===
- Bald Mountain – An elevation located northeast of Old Forge.
- Bear Lake – A lake located east of Otter Lake.
- Bear Pond – A lake north of Stillwater Reservoir.
- Beaver Dam Pond – A lake located east of Witchhopple Lake.
- Big Otter Lake – A lake located west of Old Forge on the border of Lewis County.
- Bisby Lodge – A bench located northeast of Trusty Mountain.
- Bottle Mountain – An elevation located northeast of Old Forge.
- Bubb Lake – A lake located west of Eagle Bay.
- Cage Lake – A lake located on the northern town border.
- Clear Lake – A lake located north of Witchhopple Lake.
- Evergreen Lake – A lake located northeast of Stillwater.
- Fernow Mountain – An elevation located east of Old Forge.
- Flatrock Mountain – An elevation located northeast of Minnehaha.
- Fourth Lake – A large lake shared with Hamilton County. Fourth Lake is actually the last part of a larger lake with each section having an ordinal designation. This system is the Fulton Chain Lakes.
- Gull Lake – A lake located south of McKeever on the southern town line. The lake is partially in the town of Ohio.
- Gull Lake – A lake located north-northeast of Little Rapids.
- Gull Lake – A lake located southwest of Minnehaha.
- Independence Lake – A lake located west of Carter Station.
- Jones Mountain – An elevation located east of Minnehaha.
- Lake Rondaxe – A lake located east of Carter Station.
- Little Moose Lake – A lake located southeast of Old Forge.
- Little Moose Mountain – A mountain located southeast of Old Forge.
- Little Roundtop – An elevation located east of Jones Mountain.
- Little Safford Lake – A lake located southeast of Carter Station.
- McCauley Mountain – A mountain located south of Old Forge.
- Middle Branch Lake – A lake west of the hamlet of Thendara near the western town border.
- Middle Settlement Lake – A lake west of the hamlet of Thendara, south of Middle Branch Lake.
- Moose River Mountain – An elevation located northeast of Minnehaha.
- Moshier Reservoir – A Reservoir west of Stillwater Reservoir.
- Moss Lake – A small lake located northwest of Eagle Bay.
- Moulin Mountain – An elevation located north of Old Forge.
- Neejer Hill – An elevation located south of Minnehaha.
- Nelson Lake – A lake located south of the hamlet of Minnehaha. The lake features an outlet creek that flows into Middle Branch Moose River, and an access trail with a hand launch off an unimproved road from NY Route 28. The lake hosts many species of fish.
- Nicks Lake – A lake located south of Old Forge.
- Odor Pond – A small pond located north of Salmon Lake.
- Old Forge Pond – A small lake located by Old Forge.
- Panther Mountain – An elevation located southeast of Old Forge. Partially in the Town of Ohio.
- Panther Mountain – An elevation located north of Stillwater Reservoir.
- Peaked Mountain Lake – A lake north of Stillwater Reservoir.
- Rose Mountain – An elevation located east-southeast of Minnehaha.
- Salmon Lake – A lake located north of Stillwater Reservoir.
- Sitz Mountain – An elevation north of Stillwater Reservoir.
- Slide Off Mountain – A mountain located northeast of Old Forge.
- Sis Lake – A small lake west of Eagle Bay.
- South Pond – A lake located east of Twitchell Lake.
- Stillwater Mountain – A mountain located south of Stillwater Reservoir.
- Stillwater Reservoir – A large lake in the northern part of the town.
- Sugarloaf Mountain – An elevation located northeast of Old Forge.
- Tooker Mountain – An elevation located southeast of Minnehaha.
- Trusty Mountain – An elevation located east-southeast of Minnehaha.
- Twitchell Lake – A lake located northeast of Big Moose.
- West Pond – A lake located east of Big Moose.
- Witchhopple Lake – A lake located north of Stillwater Reservoir.
- Wolf Pond – A lake located northeast of Stillwater.
- Woodhull Mountain – An elevation located east-southeast of Minnehaha.

== Departments ==
Webb's public services include the Webb Police Department, the Department of Public Works, and the Highway Department.

=== Webb Police Department ===
The Webb Police Department provides law enforcement services for Town of Webb and is headed by Chief Jason Mulcahy. Upon a look into the public perception of the department in February 2021, the Town of Webb government concluded that residents, overall, were "very pleased" and "highly complimentary of the members of the police departments and their performance and professionalism".
