= Central New York Region =

Term to describe the central region of New York for tourism purposes

Coordinates: 43°N 75°W

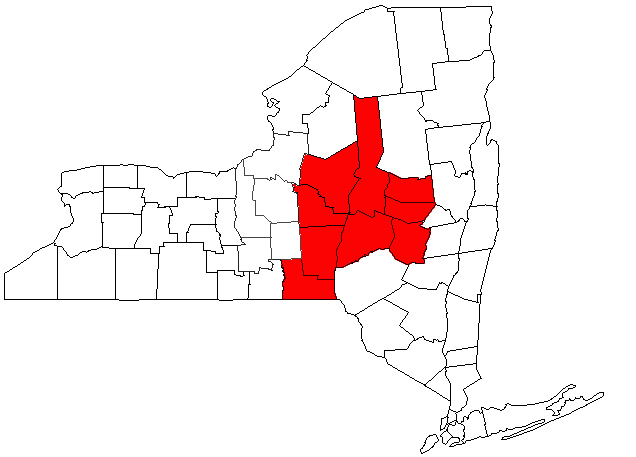
Central New York Region

The Central New York Region (formerly the Central-Leatherstocking Region, also known as Leatherstocking Country) is a term used by the New York State Department of Economic Development to broadly describe the central region of New York for tourism purposes. The region roughly corresponds to the Mohawk and upper Susquehanna valleys. It is one of two partially overlapping regions that collectively identify as Central New York, the other being roughly equating to the Syracuse metropolitan area.

== Geography ==
The region includes the following counties and cities:

Broome County	– Binghamton
Chenango County	– Norwich
Herkimer County	– Little Falls
Madison County	– Oneida
Montgomery County	– Amsterdam
Oneida County	– Utica, Rome, Sherrill (smallest city in New York)
Otsego County	– Oneonta, Cooperstown
Schoharie County	– Cobleskill

The region has a population of 764,240, according to the 2000 Census.

== Travel and tourism ==
The Central region of New York (formerly the Central-Leatherstocking Region) is a tourism region in New York State defined by the New York State Division of Tourism (I Love NY). It includes elements of the surrounding regions, forming a microcosm of the state as a whole, with hills and rivers, cities and farms, and places of hard work and recreation.

The eight-county area is known for its fresh produce and homemade goods from numerous family-run farms and farm stands, an abundance of B&Bs, country houses and inns offering overnight accommodations and culinary experiences, live musical and theatrical performances at various venues, year-round festivals, museums and exhibits exploring cultural heritage and ancestry, and trailblazing opportunities throughout its many forests and lakeside areas.

The National Baseball Hall of Fame and Museum and the International Boxing Hall of Fame are both located within this region.

== Popular culture ==
- Leatherstocking Country refers to the fictional character Natty Bumppo, featured by author James Fenimore Cooper in his collection of stories, Leatherstocking Tales, set in this region. Leatherstocking is a term for the leather leggings often worn by Native Americans to protect their legs from brush and briars in the woods.
