= Old Forge, New York =

- Hamlet and CDP
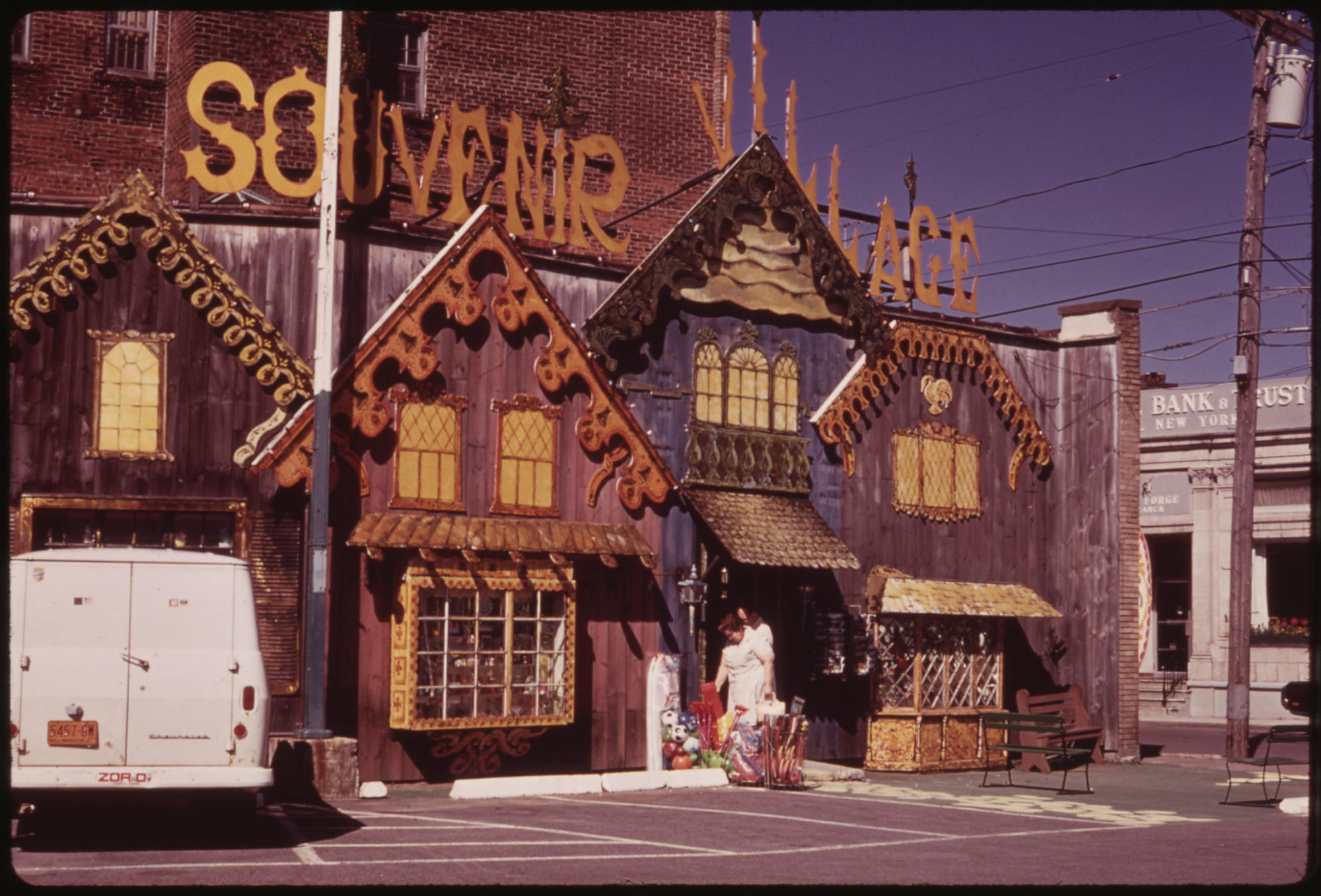
- Souvenir shop in Old Forge, 1973

- Location within New York Location within the United States
- Coordinates: 43°42′23″N 74°58′09″W
- Country: United States
- State: New York
- County: Herkimer
- Town: Webb
- Settled: 1798
- Incorporated: October 1903
- Dissolved: March 31, 1936

Area
  - Total: 1.97 sq mi (5.09 km^{2})
  - Land: 1.79 sq mi (4.63 km^{2})
  - Water: 0.18 sq mi (0.46 km^{2})
- Elevation: 1,857 ft (566 m)

Population (2023)
  - Total: 727
  - Density: 407.0/sq mi (157.15/km^{2})
- Time zone: UTC−5 (EST)
  - Summer (DST): UTC−4 (EDT)
- ZIP Code: 13420
- Area code: 315
- FIPS code: 36-54639
- GNIS feature ID: 2631633

Old Forge is a hamlet (and census-designated place) on New York State Route 28 in the town of Webb in Herkimer County, New York, United States. As of the 2020 census, Old Forge had a population of 727. Old Forge was formerly a village but dissolved its incorporation in 1936; it remains the principal community in the region. As one of the western gateway communities of the Adirondack Park, Old Forge has an extensive business district primarily directed at tourism, especially during the summer months. The local school is the Town of Webb UFSD, a K–12 institution with the Timberwolves as its mascot (changed from Eskimos in 2023). Old Forge often records the lowest winter temperatures in New York. On February 17, 1979, the record low temperature for New York was set in Old Forge at −52 °F (−47 °C).

== History ==
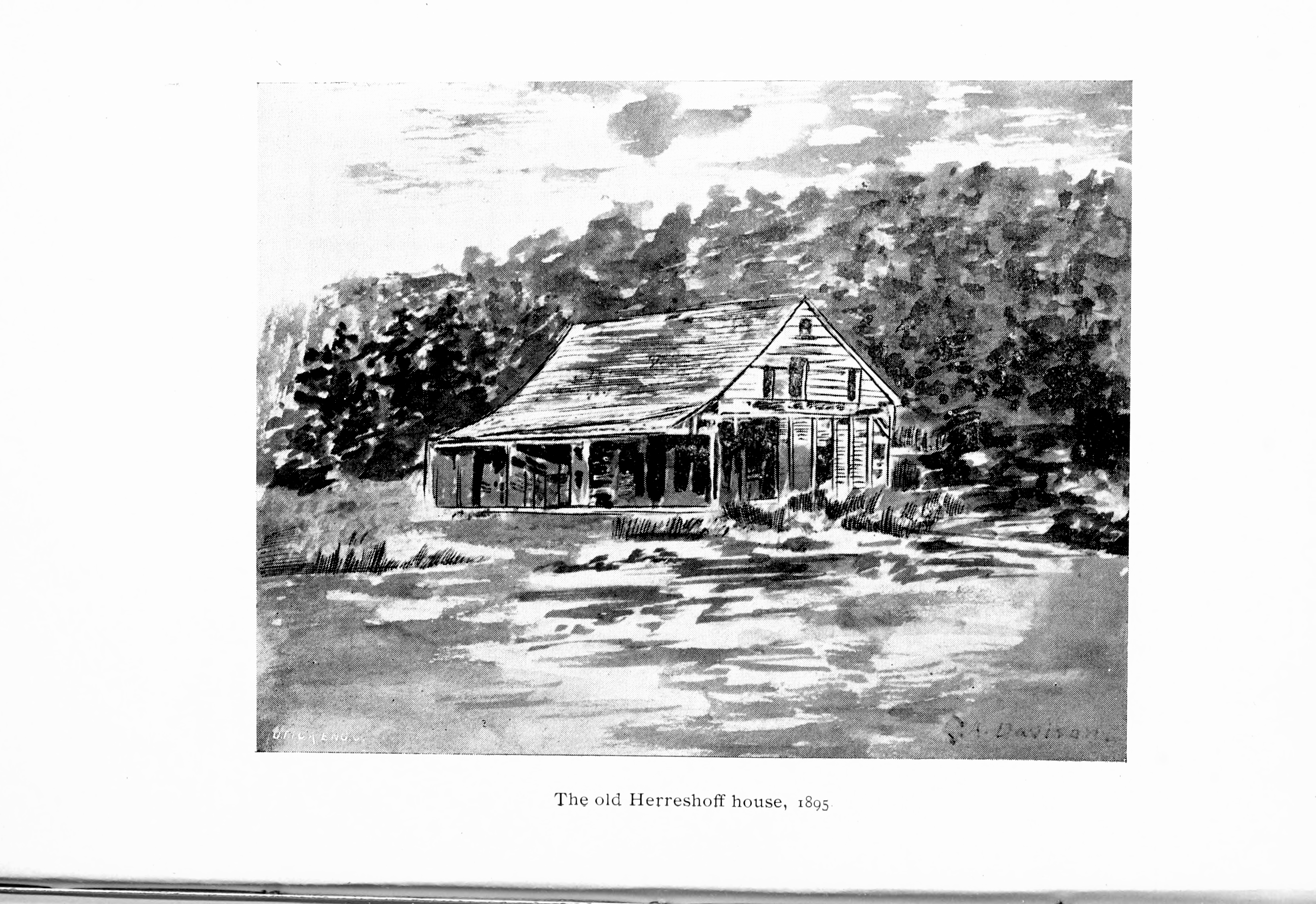
Herreshoff House in 1895

In 1798, the 210,000-acre (85,000 ha) area including Old Forge came into possession of the Brown family of Rhode Island, through a transaction involving Aaron Burr. John Francis Brown built a 25-mile (40 km) wagon trail from Remsen and attempted to settle about 20 families in the area. The land was unsuitable for farming, these attempts failed, and the area was abandoned by 1803.

One of John Brown's daughters, Sarah "Sally" Brown (1773–1846), married in 1801 Charles Frederick Herreshoff II (1763–1819). Together, they moved to the area and attempted to raise sheep, opened an iron mine, and built the first forge. These ventures again failed, and Herreshoff committed suicide in 1819. (see Herreshoff family) A few settlers remained, including Nat Foster.

The railroad was built in 1888, originally horse-drawn with wooden rails. Before the railroad was completed, the plans were changed to use steam power rather than horses. A station was constructed at nearby Thendara.

Old Forge was incorporated as a village in October 1903. The incorporation would be short-lived, as residents voted to dissolve the village on July 11, 1933, 117 to 96, due to the high cost of government operations. A second vote for the final dissolution plan took place on October 21, 1933, also in favor. The New York Supreme Court, 5th Judicial District, handed down a court order three months later suspending the dissolution process due to a lawsuit claiming the special election in October was illegal based on taxpayer and distribution factors within the plan. After an appeal to the New York Supreme Court, Appellate Division, Fourth Department, the Village of Old Forge was officially able to dissolve on March 31, 1936.

== Notable features ==
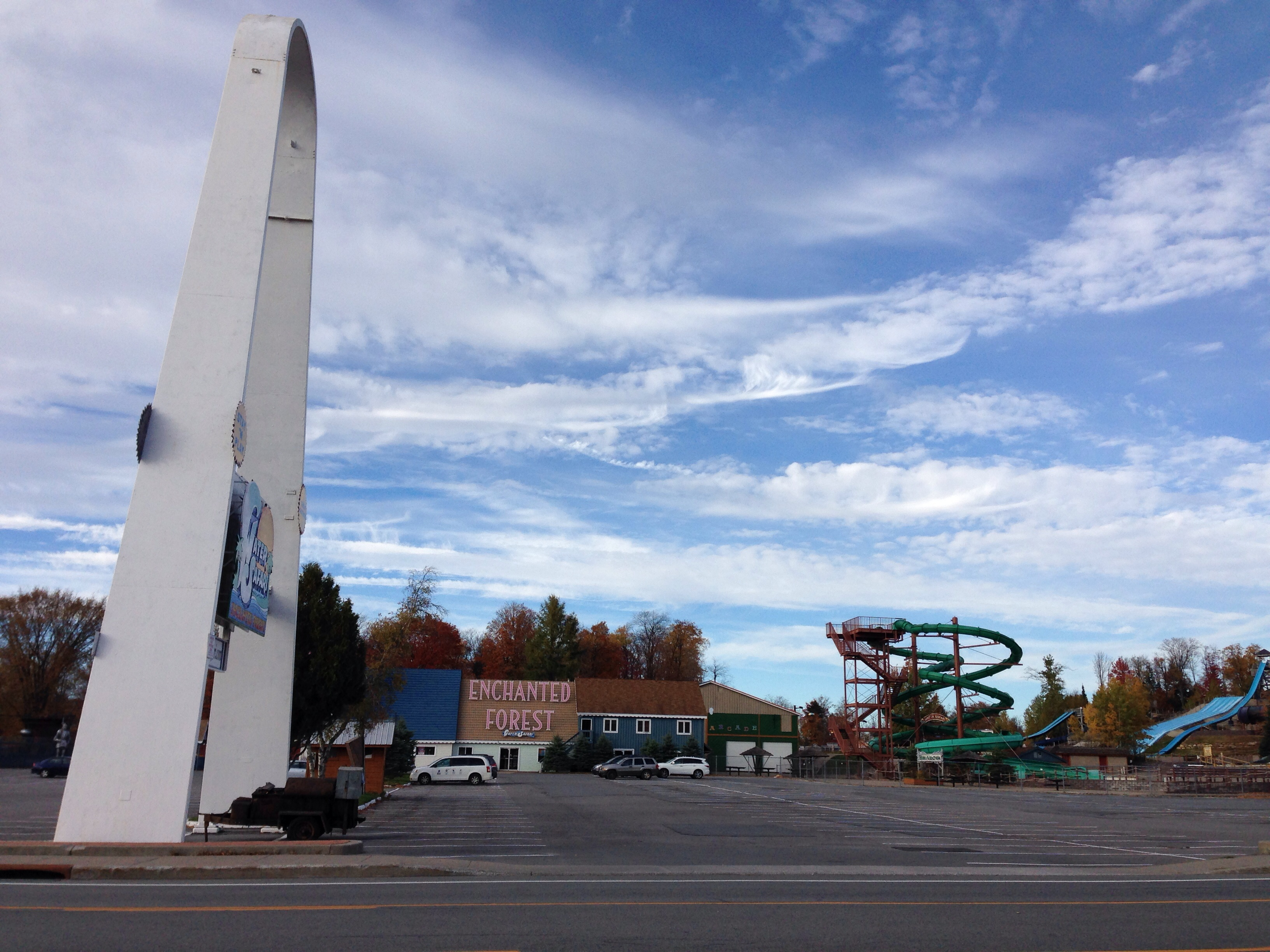
Enchanted Forest Water Safari

Many peaks can be seen from the village, including McCauley Mountain, home of McCauley Mountain Ski Resort. As Old Forge is frequently affected by lake-effect snow, and with 65% snowmaking capabilities, McCauley averages a base of 120 inches (3,000 mm) and 105 days of skiing.

Snowfall totals also contribute to the area's other primary winter draw, snowmobiling. Dubbed the "Snowmobile Capital of the East" by USA Today, Old Forge controls primary access to more than 500 miles (800 km) of groomed trails. These trails, combined with operative sidewalk and limited street use, often ridable frozen lakes (especially the adjoining Fulton Chain of Lakes), and connection to other large trail systems, offer substantial area for the sport.

The western terminus of the Northern Forest Canoe Trail is found near Old Forge. The water trail continues on for approximately 700 miles (1,100 km) to the eastern terminal in Fort Kent, Maine. The route was completed in 2006 and runs through both public and private lands. It is based on routes once used by Native Americans and pioneers and is the longest water trail in the United States.

The Goodsell House was listed on the National Register of Historic Places in 2006.

Enchanted Forest Water Safari in Old Forge is New York's largest water theme park as of 2026.

View Arts Center is a community center that offers a broad range of activities, including exhibitions, performances, events and workshops, in addition to on-going offerings of yoga, private painting and pottery lessons and group classes.

== Airport and dam ==
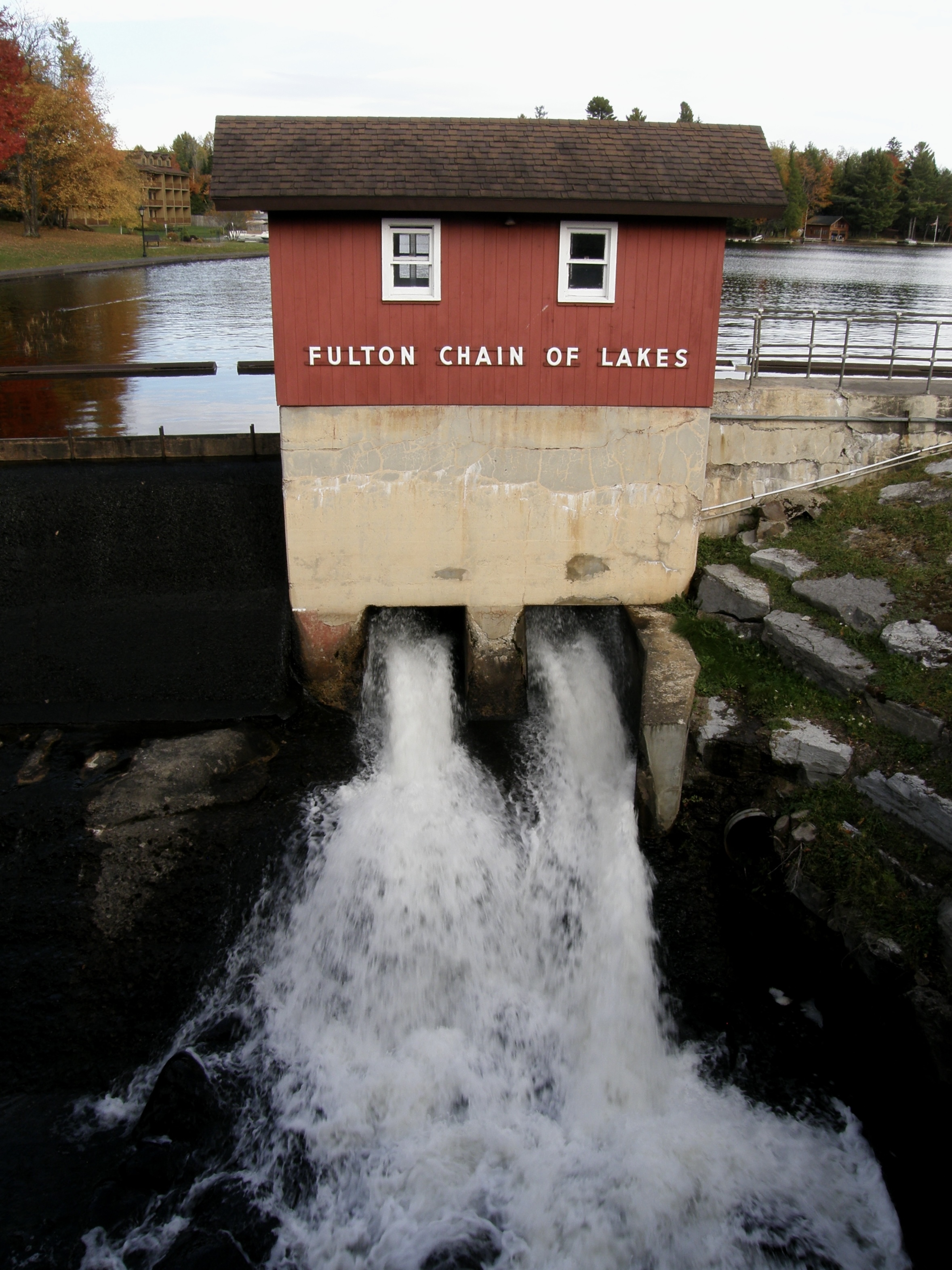
Dam on Old Forge Pond

Old Forge Airport is a small grass-field airport that is one mile north of the actual town. There are two runways. The airport is unattended and is privately owned. Permission must be obtained before landing. The Old Forge Dam separates the Fulton Chain of Lakes and the Moose River.

== Geography and climate ==
Old Forge is located in northern Herkimer County at 43°42′23″N 74°58′09″W, in the southern part of the town of Webb. The community lies within the Adirondack Mountains, a southern extension of the Canadian Shield and an important geologic feature of New York. As with any settlement in Adirondack Park, development both inside and outside the hamlet of Old Forge is somewhat restricted, and land use policies set forth by the Adirondack Park Agency must be observed.

According to the United States Census Bureau, the CDP has a total area of 2.0 square miles (5.1 km^{2}), of which 1.8 square miles (4.6 km^{2}) are land and 0.2 square miles (0.5 km^{2}), or 9.06%, are water.

The primary highway passing through Old Forge is New York State Route 28, leading east 22 miles (35 km) to Raquette Lake and southwest 26 miles (42 km) to Route 12 at Alder Creek. Old Forge lies along the Moose River at the western end of the Fulton Chain of Lakes. The climate is warm summer humid continental.

Climate data for Old Forge, New York, 1991–2020 normals, extremes 1907–2021
Month	Jan	Feb	Mar	Apr	May	Jun	Jul	Aug	Sep	Oct	Nov	Dec	Year
Record high °F (°C)	64 (18)	61 (16)	76 (24)	86 (30)	93 (34)	92 (33)	95 (35)	93 (34)	94 (34)	84 (29)	76 (24)	62 (17)	95 (35)
Mean maximum °F (°C)	50.8 (10.4)	49.4 (9.7)	57.8 (14.3)	73.0 (22.8)	81.6 (27.6)	84.0 (28.9)	84.5 (29.2)	83.7 (28.7)	81.7 (27.6)	73.0 (22.8)	62.4 (16.9)	51.4 (10.8)	87.0 (30.6)
Mean daily maximum °F (°C)	26.1 (−3.3)	28.7 (−1.8)	36.3 (2.4)	49.9 (9.9)	63.8 (17.7)	71.1 (21.7)	74.7 (23.7)	73.7 (23.2)	67.4 (19.7)	54.8 (12.7)	42.0 (5.6)	31.2 (−0.4)	51.6 (10.9)
Daily mean °F (°C)	15.8 (−9.0)	17.7 (−7.9)	25.7 (−3.5)	39.4 (4.1)	52.5 (11.4)	60.8 (16.0)	64.6 (18.1)	63.6 (17.6)	56.9 (13.8)	45.2 (7.3)	33.6 (0.9)	22.8 (−5.1)	41.6 (5.3)
Mean daily minimum °F (°C)	5.5 (−14.7)	6.6 (−14.1)	15.0 (−9.4)	28.9 (−1.7)	41.1 (5.1)	50.5 (10.3)	54.5 (12.5)	53.4 (11.9)	46.4 (8.0)	35.6 (2.0)	25.2 (−3.8)	14.5 (−9.7)	31.4 (−0.3)
Mean minimum °F (°C)	−24.8 (−31.6)	−18.8 (−28.2)	−10.7 (−23.7)	13.7 (−10.2)	26.7 (−2.9)	35.4 (1.9)	43.4 (6.3)	40.9 (4.9)	31.1 (−0.5)	21.7 (−5.7)	6.0 (−14.4)	−11.1 (−23.9)	−28.1 (−33.4)
Record low °F (°C)	−43 (−42)	−52 (−47)	−36 (−38)	−10 (−23)	16 (−9)	24 (−4)	30 (−1)	23 (−5)	18 (−8)	3 (−16)	−20 (−29)	−43 (−42)	−52 (−47)
Average precipitation inches (mm)	4.31 (109)	3.21 (82)	3.20 (81)	3.58 (91)	4.45 (113)	4.67 (119)	4.42 (112)	4.32 (110)	4.15 (105)	5.15 (131)	4.21 (107)	4.09 (104)	49.76 (1,264)
Average snowfall inches (cm)	46.7 (119)	30.9 (78)	22.6 (57)	5.3 (13)	0.5 (1.3)	0.0 (0.0)	0.0 (0.0)	0.0 (0.0)	0.0 (0.0)	2.2 (5.6)	14.9 (38)	34.8 (88)	157.9 (399.9)
Average precipitation days (≥ 0.01 in)	19.4	15.4	13.9	12.5	13.8	12.4	12.7	12.0	11.9	14.1	15.6	18.1	171.8
Average snowy days (≥ 0.1 in)	17.0	13.0	9.9	3.2	0.5	0.0	0.0	0.0	0.0	1.2	7.0	14.6	66.4
Source 1: NOAA
Source 2: National Weather Service

== Demographics ==
Historical population
Census	Pop.	Note	%±
2020	727		—
U.S. Decennial Census

As of the census of 2010, there were 756 people, 371 households, and 208 families residing in the CDP. The population density was 420.0 inhabitants per square mile (162.2/km^{2}). The racial makeup of the CDP was 97.0% White, 0.4% Black or African American, 0.7% Native American, 0.3% Asian, 0.0% Pacific Islander, 0.1% from other races, and 1.6% from two or more races. Hispanic or Latino of any race were 1.2% of the population.

There were 371 households, out of which 19.4% had children under the age of 18 living with them, 46.1% were married couples living together, 5.9% had a female householder with no husband present, and 43.9% were non-families. 38.0% of all households were made up of individuals, and 15.4% had someone living alone who was 65 years of age or older. The average household size was 2.04 and the average family size was 2.67.

In the CDP, the population was spread out, with 19.0% under the age of 20, 5.2% from 20 to 24, 19.5% from 25 to 44, 37.4% from 45 to 64, and 19.1% who were 65 years of age or older. The median age was 47.9 years. For every 100 females, there were 95.3 males. For every 100 females age 18 and over, there were 97.2 males.

The median income for a household in the CDP was $32,539, and the median income for a family was $62,708. Males had a median income of $32,750 versus $31,761 for females. The per capita income for the CDP was $26,662. About 3.3% of families and 10.9% of the population were below the poverty line, including 0.0% of those under age 18 and 10.6% of those age 65 or over.

=== Housing ===
There were 778 housing units at an average density of 432.2 per square mile (166.9/km^{2}). 407 units, or 52.3%, were vacant, of which 351 were for seasonal or recreational use.

There were 371 occupied housing units in the CDP. 231 were owner-occupied units (61.3%), while 140 were renter-occupied (37.7%). The homeowner vacancy rate was 4.1% of total units. The rental unit vacancy rate was 18.1%.

== Transportation ==
New York Route 28, running northeast–southwest, the commercial center of the village.

Old Forge Airport, a private use airport is one mile north of Old Forge.

Until 1965, the New York Central Railroad ran passenger service to Thendara station, two miles to the southwest.

== Notable people ==
- Lowell Bailey, U.S. Olympic athlete in biathlon and World Cup skier, resided and learned to ski as a youth in Old Forge
- Louie Ehrensbeck: U.S. Olympic athlete in biathlon
- Richard Evans, US Army brigadier general
- Robert Hazard, singer
- Patrick Farmer, NCAA and professional women's soccer coach
- Benjamin Harrison, 23rd President of the United States built a summer camp named Berkley Lodge
- Hank Kashiwa, US National ski champion, U.S. Olympic skier, and sports commentator
- Martin E. Lind, US Army major general, lived in Old Forge during retirement
- Alexandra Waterbury, model and ballet dancer
