= China Railway (disambiguation) =

China Railway is the national railway operator in the People's Republic of China.

China Railway may refer to companies related to defunct Ministry of Railways:

- China Railway Engineering Corporation, former construction company, now holding company
  - China Railway Group Limited, construction company
    - China Railway No.2 Group
    - China Railway Seventh Group
- China Railway Construction Corporation, former construction company, now holding company
  - China Railway Construction Corporation Limited, construction company
- China Railway Materials
- Rail transportation in China
