= Van Paesschen =

Van Paesschen is a surname, used primarily in Belgium. Notable people with the surname include:

- Bram Van Paesschen (1979–2025), Belgian film director and editor
- Stanny Van Paesschen (born 1957), Belgian Olympic equestrian

== See also ==
- Hans Hendrik van Paesschen (c. 1510–1582), a Flemish architect
