= Empire of Dust =

2011 film by Bram Van Paesschen

- Directed by: Bram Van Paesschen
- Produced by: Bart Van Langendonck
- Cinematography: Emmanuel Gras
- Edited by: Dieter Diependaele; Bram Van Paesschen
- Production companies: Savage Productions; Eyeworks; Flanders Audiovisual Fund; Media Development Programme of the EU; Belgian Development Cooperation; RTBF; Beursschouwburg; Belgian Taxshelter for Film Financing
- Distributed by: Savage Film
- Release date: 2011
- Running time: 77 minutes
- Country: Belgium
- Languages: French; Mandarin; Swahili; English creole

Empire of Dust is a 2011 Belgian documentary film directed by Bram Van Paesschen.

The film documents the struggle of a Chinese railroad logistics worker and his Congolese interpreter attempting to rebuild a crumbling road in Central Africa with local workers who are unmotivated to work.

== Plot ==
The film opens on June 17, 2010 at the China Railway Seventh Group (CREC-7) compound in Kolwezi, located in the Katanga province of the Democratic Republic of the Congo. The Congolese government has a contract with the Chinese to develop their national infrastructure in exchange for access to the country's mineral rights, so CREC is attempting to rebuild a road that spans 296 kilometers (184 miles) from Kolwezi to the province's capital, Lubumbashi. The road had been built by the Belgians in 1954 and is in ruins because of a lack of maintenance after the Belgians left the continent during the 1960s Decolonisation of Africa. CREC plans to stay for 20 years after its completion to ensure that the road is being maintained. The two men who primarily deal with this task are CREC's head of logistics, Chinese expatriate Lao Yang and his translator, Eddy, also called "Eternal Dragon", a native from Kinshasa who is fluent in Mandarin, French, English and Swahili. The Chinese have a contract with the government requiring the laborers to be Congolese natives, but Lao struggles to deal with the locals due to cultural differences: the locals do not take their work seriously and steal from the company often.

Needing two truckloads of a specific gravel, Lao and Eddy travel to the nearby gravel pit to pick up the gravel. On the way, Lao lectures Eddy that he does not know anything about the history of his own country because he claims that the railroad's bridge was built twenty years later than it was. Eddy argues that the country is "too vast". Once they arrive at the gravel pit, Lao is baffled to see that the workers are standing around aimlessly and the trucks they were told to pick up are empty. The two men wait for the manager of the gravel company to arrive so the workers can get direction on what to do. The manager stalls them before explaining that they will get the gravel loaded later. With nothing left to do, the men return to the compound without their gravel.

On July 1, 2010, soon after the country's 50th anniversary of independence from Belgian rule, Lao explains that they have had to start measuring their gasoline because the workers have been siphoning it. Two Chinese supervisors discuss their frustrations with the local workers: the locals are not motivated to work and frequently quit, do not listen to directions and leave for the day before their work has been completed. They are also frustrated with the thievery and discuss how they wish they could pay the police to beat up thieves in front of the workers to send a message. After the workers stop what they are doing to yell at a passing vehicle for not waiting long enough to pass one of the CREC vehicles, the laborers make fun of the supervisor's attempt to communicate with them. One of the Chinese supervisors says "I feel sorry for them. But sometimes I also hate them."

After a truckload of pipes are delivered to the job site, a count reveals that there are only 21 when there should be 38. Eddy explains in broken English to the truck's driver, a Kenyan, that he needs to make sure the correct number of pipes are loaded into the truck before delivery, and realizes that his sunglasses have been stolen from the vehicle. Lao asks Eddy if he contacted the manager of the gravel company, and Eddy claims that he has, but he will not answer the phone in the morning. Lao points out that it is afternoon and tells Eddy to keep trying, but Eddy claims that it will not do any good because he will not pick up the phone. Lao, growing increasingly frustrated with the impossibility of accomplishing what should be simple tasks, says "It's all so tiresome." (A screenshot of this has become an Internet meme.)

Attempting to make some progress on the infrastructure, Lao attempts to buy some rocks for wall construction instead of the gravel, but the quarry refuses, afraid that the Chinese will start making their own gravel and put them out of business. After being unable to agree on a price for the rocks, they leave empty-handed. Lao, increasingly impatient with the gravel company's continued delays, goes to a competitor and places an order for some gravel. Later, before sleeping, the locals laugh about being compared to apes by their Chinese employers and then in turn also make a racist joke by claiming that the Chinese "look like pigs".

CREC, blaming Lao for the delays, grows impatient and tells him that they need the gravel by the end of the month. Before going to pick up the gravel, Lao realizes that the dump truck, driven irresponsibly by the locals, has been damaged and the tailgate now will not close properly. Lao fears that even if they brace it, the truck will lose the gravel on the way back. On the way to the quarry, Lao realizes that the area's railroad, built in the 1930s by the Belgians, is now abandoned and in disrepair. Lao is irritated by this because even China did not have such a sophisticated rail system at that time, and the Congolese squandered the valuable infrastructure.

At the quarry, they weld the tailgate shut so the gravel can be transported to the job site. Lao attempts to measure the gravel with a tape measure, but it is broken. Eddy claims that it is because the tape measure was made in China. The locals attempt to fill the truck to the brim, but Lao warns them that the tires will explode if they load it too heavy and forces them to remove some of the gravel. Lao laments that $2.1 billion has been spent in the Congo so far and the Chinese have yet to get any return on their investment. Lao claims that the Congolese have no sense of time and it's hard to adapt to life there.

The gravel is delivered back to the job site and construction on the road can finally begin. That night, a local radio announcer proclaims that it is only a matter of time before the Chinese, too, give up on the country and wonders who will be next to exploit their resources. The next day, a ceremony is held to commemorate the building of the road, but the ceremony is rapidly concluded so the locals can watch the World Cup.

In late July, Lao and Eddy sit down and talk while on break. Lao laments about how he still has to get rocks for wall construction, an undertaking he has been working on for six months and has made no progress on. Lao tells an impassive Eddy that it will take generations to change the culture of the Congo. The film concludes with a voice-over from Lao about the native Congolese: "On payday, the men go crazy. Two days later, they come asking to loan them money. They don't hold their drink that well, they just like drinking. They stand at the bar drinking a beer and then start shaking their behinds. It's wonderful."

== Reception ==
The film won Best Belgian Documentary at the 7th edition Docville.
