= China Overseas Engineering Group =

Chinese construction and engineering company

- Native name: 中国海外工程有限责任公司
- Formerly: China National Overseas Engineering Corporation
- Company type: Subsidiary
- Headquarters: China
- Area served: Africa
- Parent: China Railway Group Limited
- Website: en.covec.com

China Overseas Engineering Group Co., Ltd.
- Simplified Chinese: 中国海外工程有限责任公司
- Traditional Chinese: 中國海外工程有限責任公司
Transcriptions

China Overseas Engineering Group Co., Ltd. known as COVEC is a Chinese construction and engineering company that is subsidiary of China Railway Group Limited, which is organized as a large collection of engineering and design firms.

The company premiered in South Africa in 2006 when it won a 425-million rand public tender held by Trans-Caledon Tunnel Authority, the state agency responsible for bulk water infrastructure. The selection of COVEC was described by a local trade publication as unsettling to the other short listed bidders, two local construction consortia. One consisted of Group Five Construction, Grinaker-LTA, Rainbow Construction and WBHO Construction; the other was Vaal Civils, made up of Concor, CCC, Kgalagadi Multi Projects, Thuso Water, SET-MAK Civils, Mascrete and Betsy Building. COVEC's bid was 25% below the lowest other bid, and as a consequence local construction companies expressed fears about downward price pressure that would end hopes they had of a strong rebound in the construction market with better profit margins.

In Morocco, COVEC built the 67 km section of the Fez-Oujda road extending from Taza to Guercif. The project presented difficulties in terrain and geology for COVEC, requiring the levelling of hills and valleys and provision of porous materials that would provide adequate drainage in a region with water absorbing soil.

In Poland, COVEC, won the bid for construction of a highway linking Warsaw with city of Berlin in September 2009, but didn't manage to complete construction and withdrew its operations from Poland, and is now facing the threat of a €200 million compensation claim, which include four month of projected toll losses and 10 percent fine. Highway was planned to be ready for use at the time when UEFA Euro 2012 in Poland would begin, BÖGL a KRÝSL took construction after COVEC reneged contract and finished it on time.
