= Old Market (Siem Reap) =

Coordinates: 13.35382°N 103.85514°E

- ផ្សារចាស់
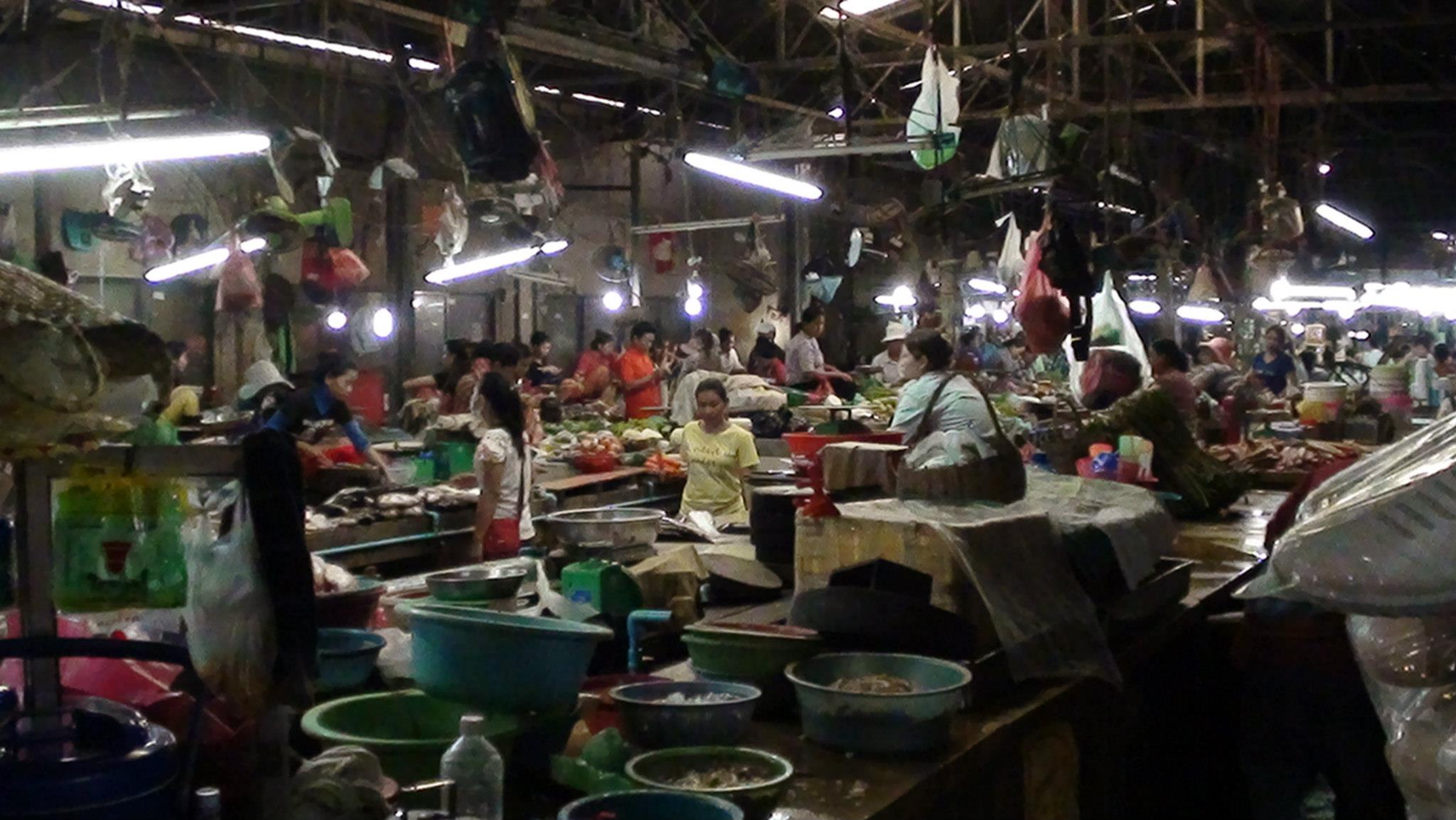
- An open view of the Old Market
- Location: 2 Thnou Street, Siem Reap, Cambodia
- Floors: 1

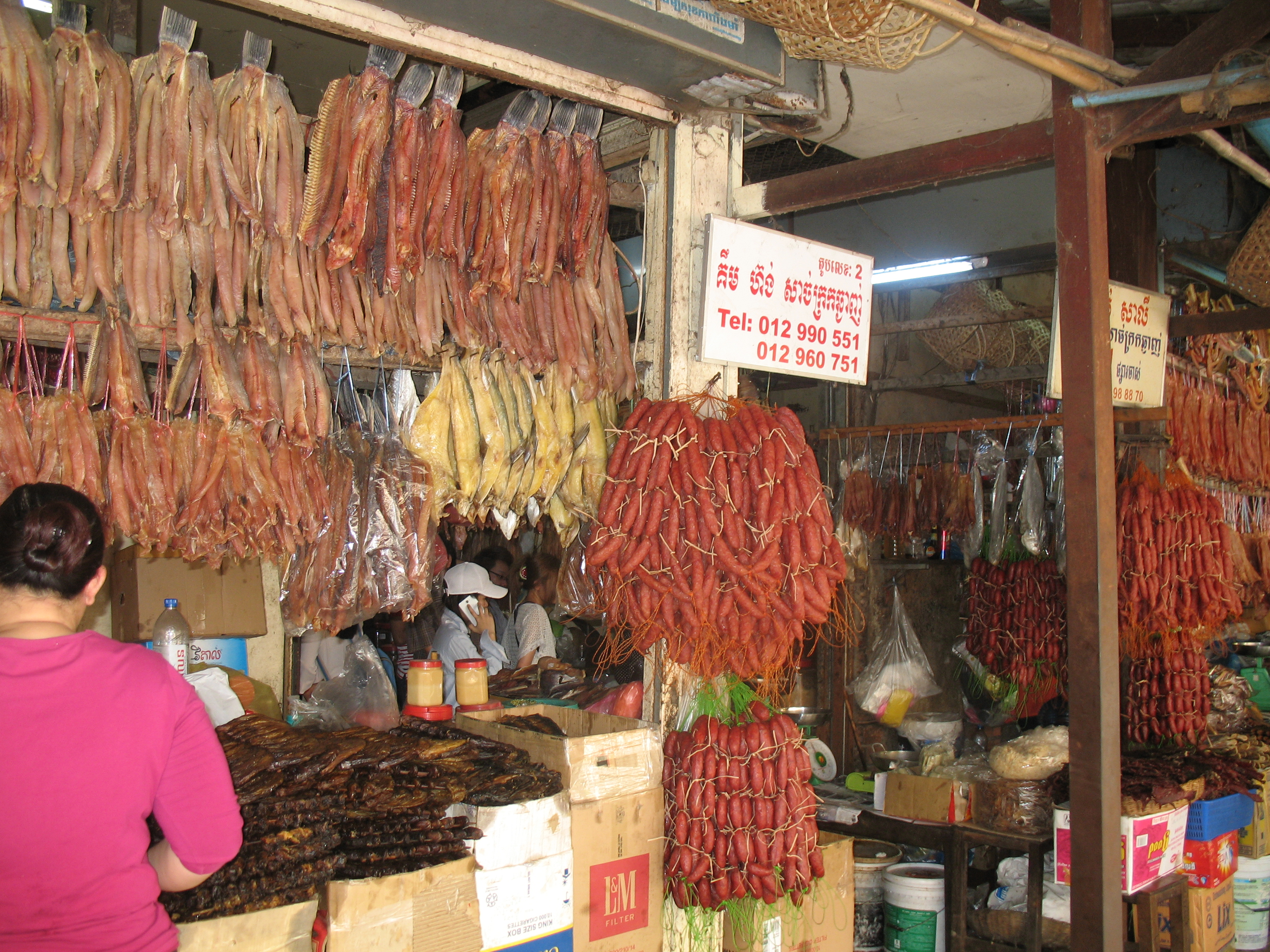
Dried fish and pork sausages for sale in the Old Market

Old Market (Khmer: ផ្សារចាស់, Phsār Cās [pʰsaː cah]), also commonly romanized as Psah Chas, Phsar Chas, Psar Chas or Psar Chaa, is a market in Siem Reap in northern Cambodia. Not to be confused with the similarly named Old Market in Phnom Penh that is geared toward locals, this market in the south of the city caters to locals and tourists alike. The market is such a fixture in Siem Reap that many businesses give their address in relation to the Old Market.

The market is popular with tourists in the city and sells souvenirs, including T-shirts, silverware, silk, wood and stone carvings, Buddhas, and other items. It is also known for its stalls offering variety of Cambodian food, such as rice, dried fish and pork sausages, vegetables and fruits, prahok, baguettes, soups and stuffed grilled frogs.

== See also ==
- Central Market (Phnom Penh)
- Old Market (Phnom Penh)
