= China Railway Engineering Equipment Group =

Chinese construction company

China Railway Engineering Equipment Group Co., Ltd.
- Native name: 中铁工程装备集团有限公司
- Company type: State-owned enterprise
- Industry: Equipment manufacturing
- Predecessor: China Railway Tunnel Equipment Manufacturing Co., Ltd.
- Founded: 22 December 2009; 16 years ago
- Headquarters: No. 99, Sixth Avenue, Zhengzhou Economic and Technological Development Zone, Henan Province, China
- Key people: Lin Junke (legal representative, chairman)
- Products: Tunnel boring machine
- Services: Equipment leasing and overhaul, electromechanical engineering construction, technical services, etc.
- Revenue: 2.5 billion RMB (2013)
- Number of employees: 1,300 (2015)
- Subsidiaries: China Railway Engineering Equipment Group Shield Machine Manufacturing Co., Ltd. China Railway Engineering Equipment Group Tunnel Equipment Manufacturing Company; China Railway Engineering Equipment Group Technology Service Co., Ltd. China Railway Engineering Equipment Group Mechanical and Electrical Engineering Co., Ltd. China Railway Engineering Equipment Group Drill Rig Manufacturing Co., Ltd.
- Website: www.crectbm.com

China Railway Engineering Equipment Group Co., Ltd. (Chinese: 中铁工程装备集团有限公司, abbreviated as CERG ("中铁装备")) is a construction machinery manufacturing enterprise under China Railway Group Limited, registered in Zhengzhou, Henan Province. Its most well-known product is the Tunnel boring machine.

As of 2025, the company has received more than 1,800 orders for shield machines and TBMs in total, with its products exported to 34 countries and regions worldwide.

== History ==
On 22 December 2009, China Railway Tunnel Equipment Manufacturing Co., Ltd. was established in Zhengzhou National Economic and Technological Development Zone, which is the predecessor of China Railway Engineering Equipment Group.

On 29 June 2012, the company signed a procurement contract for the CTE6630 shield machine with MMC–GAMUDA in Kuala Lumpur of Malaysia, marking the first time that China Railway's shield equipment entered the international market.

In November 2013, the company completed the acquisition of the intellectual property and brand usage rights related to hard rock tunnel boring machines and shaft drilling rigs from the German company Aker Wirth GmbH, marking the beginning of Chinese enterprises independently mastering core shield machine technologies.

In 2014, the world's largest rectangular shield machine independently developed by the company was successfully launched in Zhengzhou.

Starting from 2023, the company's shield equipment has been used in overseas construction projects such as the São Paulo Metro in Brazil and the KK highway tunnels in Georgia.

On 30 July 2025, China Railway Engineering Equipment Group customized and developed two super-large-diameter shield machines, "Patigarrang" and "Barangaroo", for the Western Harbour project in Sydney. Both machines have an excavation diameter of 15.7 metres, an overall length of about 113 metres, and a weight of more than 4,300 tonnes. They are used for the twin-bore road tunnel of the Western Harbour undersea tunnel in Sydney. The tunnel follows an overall S-shaped alignment, with a maximum overburden depth of about 52 metres below sea level and passes through a variety of complex strata.

== See also ==
- China Railway Group Limited
