= Bram Van Paesschen =

Belgian film director (1979–2025)

- Van Paesschen in 2011
- Born: 1979; Vilvoorde, Belgium
- Died: 10 January 2025 (aged 45); Laeken, Belgium
- Occupations: Film director and editor
- Known for: Empire of Dust

Bram Van Paesschen (1979 – 10 January 2025) was a Belgian film director and editor.

== Life and career ==
Van Paesschen was born in Vilvoorde in 1979. He moved to Brussels where he studied film at Sint-Lukas Hogeschool. His 2002 mockumentary graduation project Rookgordijn over Brussel about the 1967 L'Innovation department store fire was shown after his graduation at several international film festivals, including FID Marseille and the Buenos Aires Festival Internacional de Cine Independiente. The film became a Belgian cult classic.

The second film he directed, World of Blue / Land of O. (2005), won an award.

He directed the 2011 Empire of Dust, a documentary about the China Railway Seventh Group building a road in the Democratic Republic of the Congo. The film won the 2012 Docville Best Belgian documentary. He also directed ICI (Une lettre à Chantal Akerman) (2007), Pale Peko Bantu Mambo Ayikosake (2008), I'm New Here (2017) and De aanbidding (2017). In addition he edited films of among others Jeroen Van Der Stock, Jonas Govaerts and Rachida El Gara, including Silent Visitors and Wild Beast.

Van Paesschen died in Laeken on 10 January 2025, at the age of 45.
