= China Railway No.2 Group =

Chinese construction company

China Railway Erju
- Native name: 中国中铁二局 (Chinese)
- Company type: Subsidiary (former public)
- Traded as: SSE: 600528 (former)
- Industry: Construction
- Founded: 1950; 1978; 1998 (as limited company); 1999 (as listed company); 2017 (privatization)
- Successor: China Railway Hi-tech Industry; (the listing status only)
- Headquarters: Chengdu, China
- Revenue: ▼CN¥51.242 billion (2016)
- Operating income: ▼CN¥49 million (2016)
- Net income: CN¥168 million (2016)
- Total assets: CN¥56.146 billion (2016)
- Total equity: ▲CN¥6.243 billion (2016)
Owner
Chinese Central Government	(54.39% indirectly)
general public	(45.61% indirectly)
- Parent: China Railway Group Limited

Chinese name
- Simplified Chinese: 中国中铁二局集团有限公司
- Traditional Chinese: 中國中鐵二局集團有限公司
Transcriptions
Standard Mandarin
- Hanyu Pinyin: Zhōngguó Zhōngtiěèrjú Jítuán Yǒuxiàn Gōngsī

China Railway Erju Co., Ltd.
- Simplified Chinese: 中国中铁二局股份有限公司
- Traditional Chinese: 中國中鐵二局股份有限公司
Transcriptions
Standard Mandarin
- Hanyu Pinyin: Zhōngguó Zhōngtiě èrjú Gǔfèn Yǒuxiàn Gōngsī

China Railway Erju Engineering Co., Ltd.
- Simplified Chinese: 中铁二局工程有限公司
- Traditional Chinese: 中鐵二局工程有限公司
Transcriptions
Standard Mandarin
- Hanyu Pinyin: Zhōngtiě èrjú Gōngchéng Yǒuxiàn Gōngsī
- Website: 2j.crec.cn
- Footnotes / references in consolidated financial statement

China Railway No.2 Group Co., Ltd. and China Railway Erju Engineering Co., Ltd. were two closely connected companies. They are formerly parent-subsidiary via China Railway Erju Co., Ltd. (CREC). The group is a Chinese construction company based in Chengdu.

China Railway Erju is formerly listed on the Shanghai Stock Exchange; In turn, Erju (literally means the second bureau [of the former Ministry of Railways]) is an indirect subsidiary of China Railway Group Limited (also abb. CREC, successor of China Railway Engineering Corporation), which in turn indirectly supervised by the State-owned Assets Supervision and Administration Commission of the State Council.

In January 2017, China Railway Group Limited backdoor listing some assets, as well as privatized China Railway Erju's subsidiary China Railway Erju Engineering Co., Ltd. (Chinese: 中铁二局工程有限公司). China Railway Erju was renamed to China Railway Hi-tech Industry (CRHIC) after the transactions.

== History ==
=== Predecessor ===
The predecessor of the company was found in 1998 (China Railway No.2 Group Co., Ltd., Chinese: 中铁二局集团有限公司), which could be traced back to 1978, as the Second Bureau of Engineering of the Ministry of Railways. (Chinese: 铁道部第二工程局) The original second bureau could traced back the history to 1950, but in 1978 the bureau was split into the [new] second bureau and the fifth bureau.

=== IPO ===
In 2000, China Railway Engineering Corporation, the parent company at that time, was independent from the ministry. In 1999, most of the assets of "China Railway No.2 Group Co., Ltd." was injected into a new subsidiary China Railway Erju Co., Ltd. and floats in the Shanghai Stock Exchange in 2001. In 2007, an intermediate parent company China Railway Group Limited was formed, and also listed in the stock exchanges.

In 2015, a subsidiary China Railway Erju Engineering (Chinese: 中铁二局工程) was incorporated.

=== Privatization ===
In January 2017 China Railway Erju Engineering was sold back to China Railway Group Limited (making China Railway Erju Engineering and China Railway No.2 Group Co., Ltd. were sister company but no parent-subsidiary connection), at the same time China Railway Group Limited inject some asset to China Railway Erju Co., Ltd. as backdoor listing, renaming to China Railway Hi-tech Industry.

China Railway Erju Construction Co., Ltd. (Chinese: 中铁二局集团建筑有限公司) is a company that owned by both China Railway Erju Engineering and China Railway No.2 Group directly and indirectly by China Railway Group Limited.

== Projects ==
- Hangzhou Bay Bridge (sub-contractor)
- Datong–Xi'an Passenger Railway
- Xiamen–Shenzhen Railway
- Shuangliu Airport Railway Station
- A'ergelete Mountain Tunnel
- Guangfo Metro
- Lanzhou–Xinjiang High-Speed Railway
- (Ethiopia) Addis-Sebeta-Mieso Railway
- Khartoum-Port Sudan Railway
