= Cambodian Cultural Village =

Cambodian theme and museum park

- ភូមិវប្បធម៏កម្ពុជា
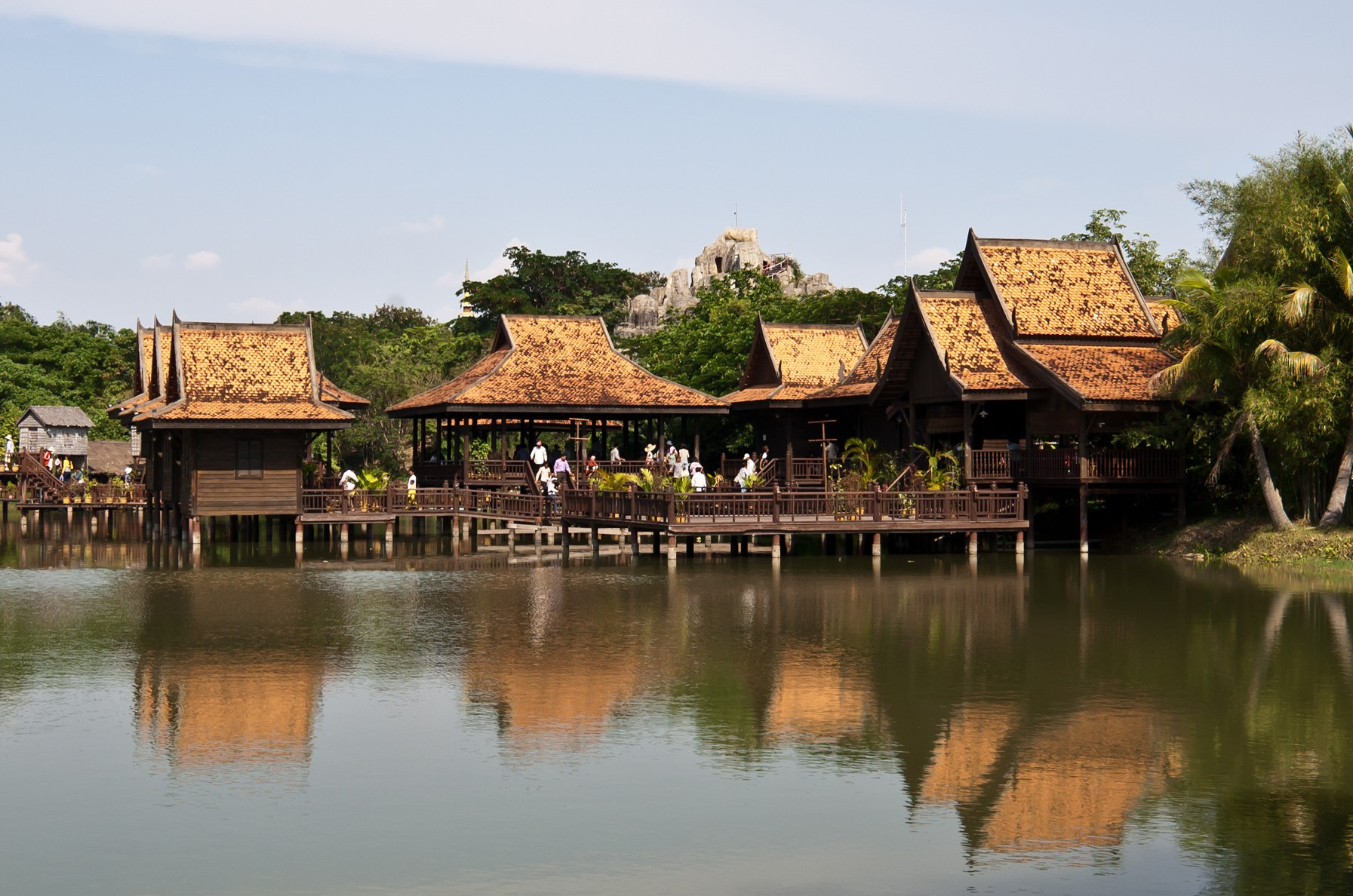
- Established: 2001 (opened 24 September 2003), (reopened June 18, 2022)
- Dissolved: 7 November 2020
- Location: Siem Reap, Cambodia
- Coordinates: 13.3751°N 103.8306°E
- Type: Cambodia and Ethnic groups in Cambodia Heritage
- Website: cambodianculturalvillage.com

Cambodian Cultural Village (Khmer: ភូមិវប្បធម៌កម្ពុជា; CCV) was a theme park and cultural museum in Siem Reap, Cambodia. It was located on road no. 6, three kilometres (1.9 mi) from the airport, six kilometres (3.7 mi) from the town and five kilometres (3.1 mi) from the famous Angkor Wat temple complex.

The theme park was constructed in 2001 and opened to the public on 24 September 2003. It covers a total area of 210,000 square meters. The CCV presents miniature versions of important historical buildings and structures, together with local customs. There are eleven unique villages, representing the varied culture heritage of nineteen ethnic groups. At each village are wood houses, carvings in stone, traditional performances in different styles such as Apsara dancing, performances of ethnic minorities from the northeastern part of Cambodia, traditional wedding ceremony rites, circuses, folk games, peacock dancing, acrobatics, elephant shows, boxing, caves of hell and more.

Cambodian Cultural Village was considered by some as "kitsch", but was popular with Cambodians and other Asian visitors. It includes a wax museum displaying scenes from the culture and history of Cambodia.

Cambodian Cultural Village permanently closed in November 2020 following the collapse in the tourism industry caused by the COVID-19 pandemic. On June 18, 2022, the park was reopened under the name of “Angkor Green Gardens Park” and operated by Dara Group Company.
