= Siem Reap =

Second-largest city in Cambodia

Siem Reap ក្រុងសៀមរាប Siĕm Riĕp
- City
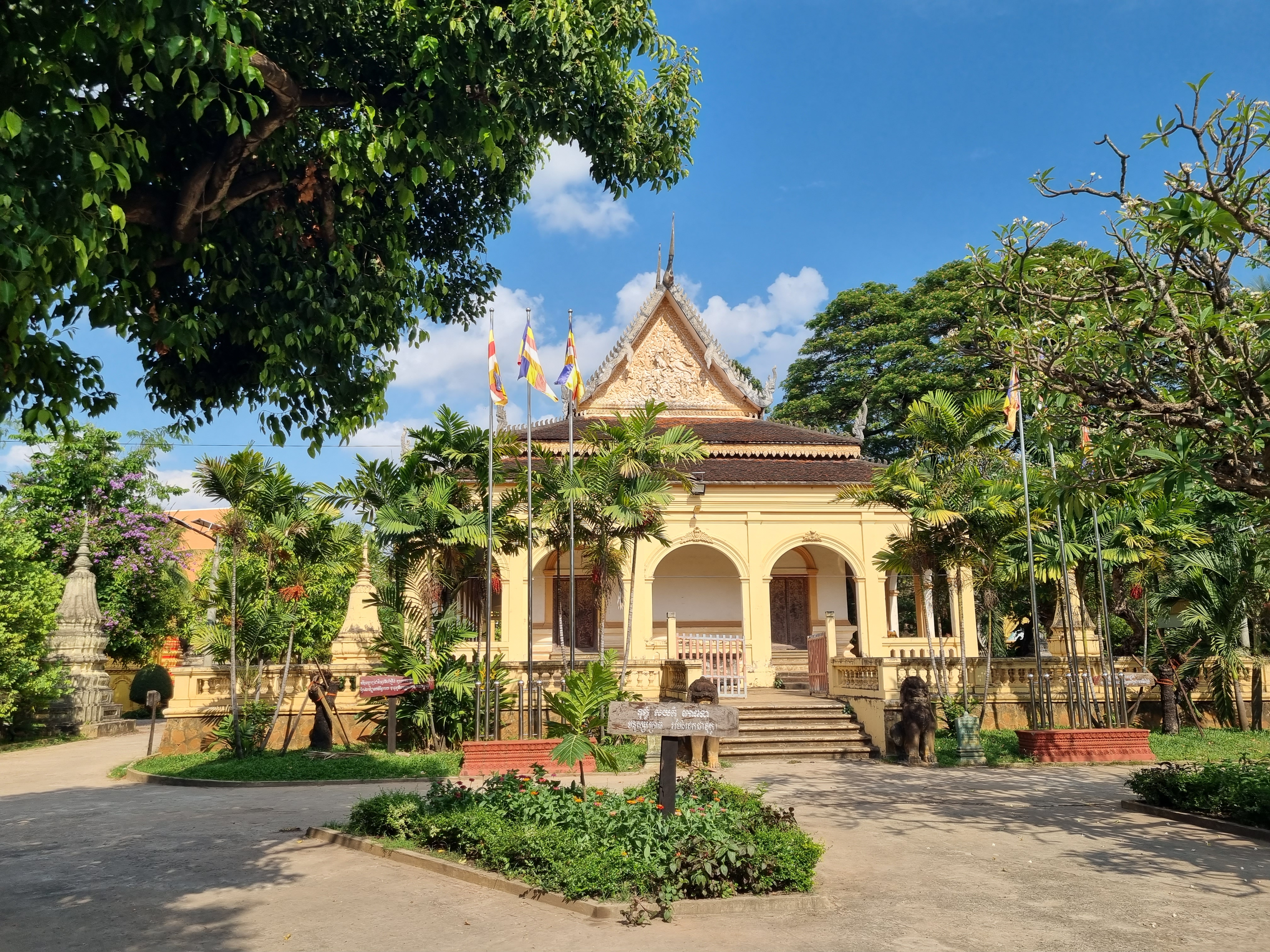
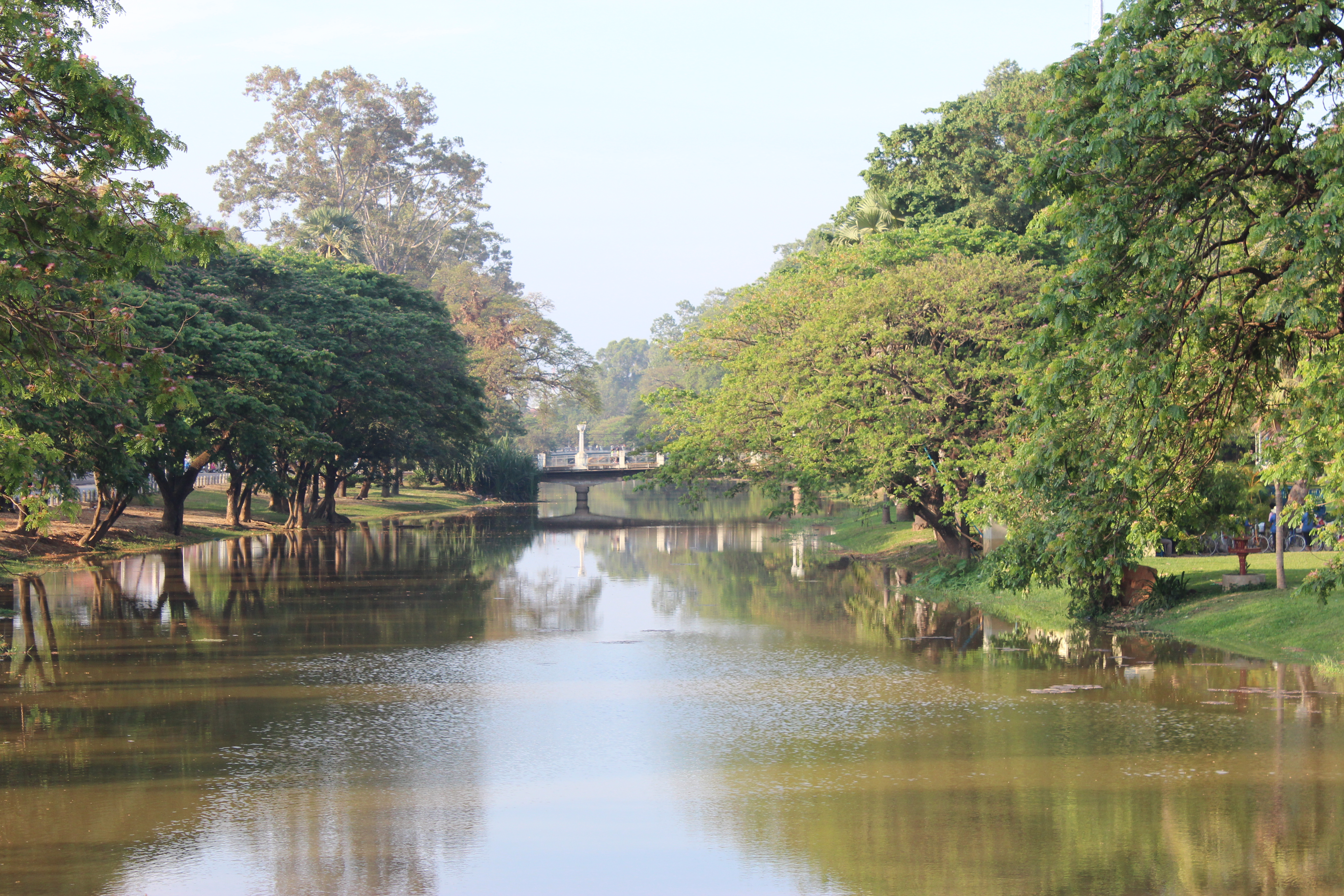
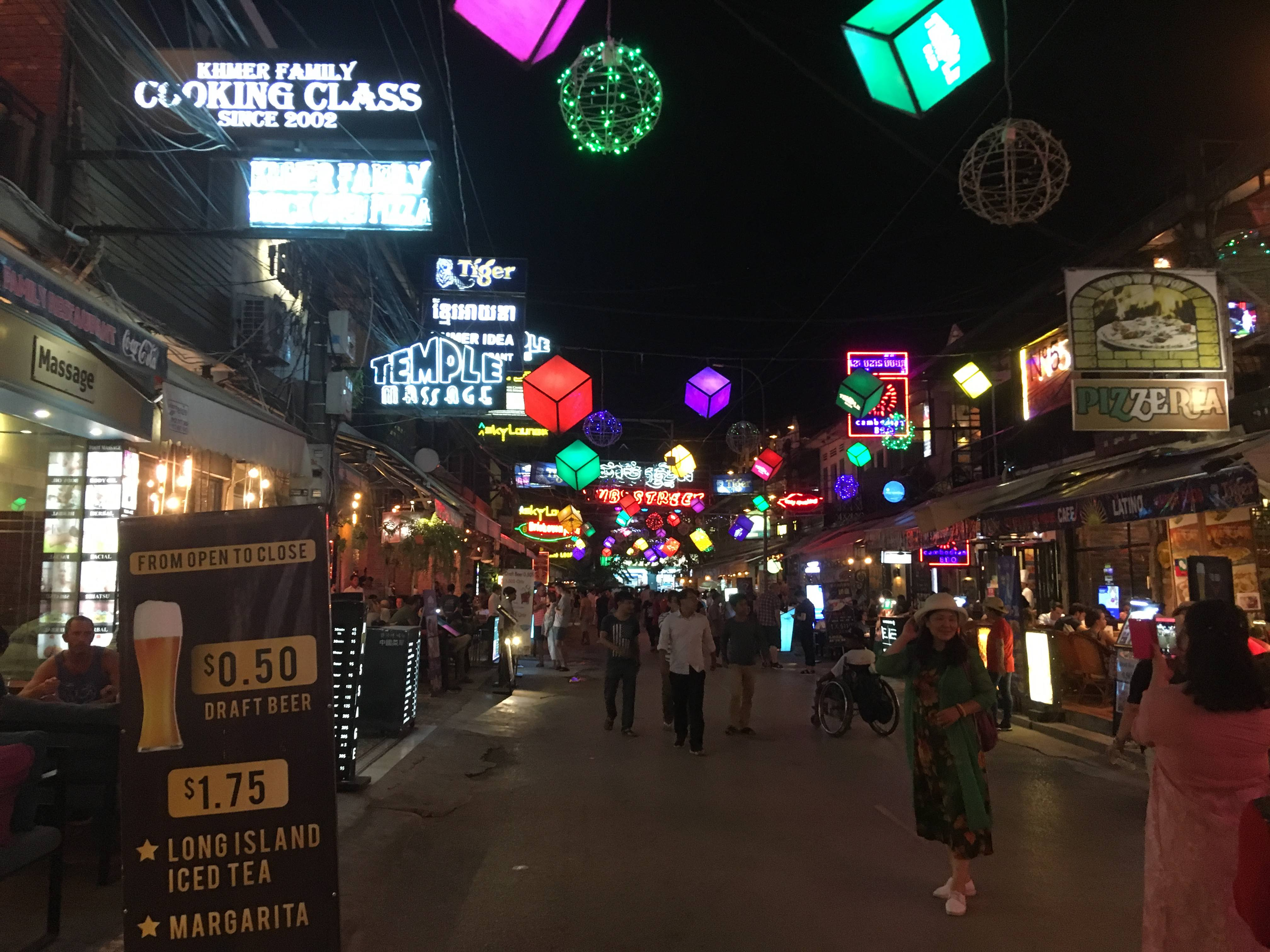
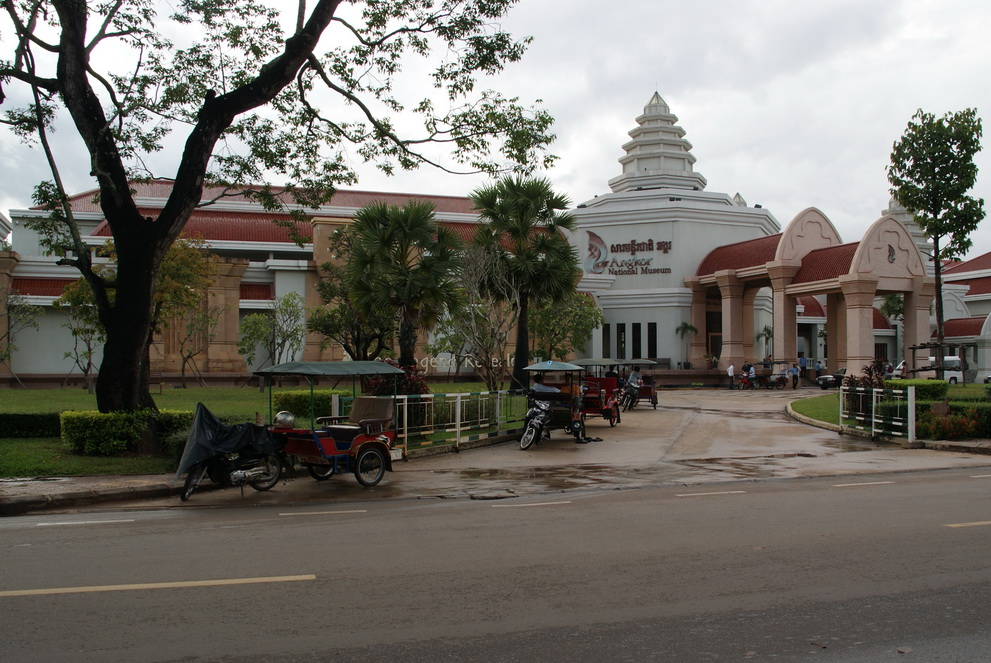
- From top, left to right: Wat Damnak, Siem Reap River, Pub Street, Angkor National Museum
- Nickname: Temple Town
- Location within Cambodia Location within Asia
- Coordinates: 13°21′44″N 103°51′35″E
- Country: Cambodia
- Province: Siem Reap
- Municipality: Siem Reap
- Settled: Before 968
- Official: 1907

Government
  - Mayor: Nuon Putheara
- Elevation: 18 m (59 ft)

Population (2019)
  - Total: 245,494
  - Rank: 2nd
- Time zone: UTC+7 (ICT)

Siem Reap (សៀមរាប, Siĕm Riĕp; Khmer pronunciation: [siəm riəp]) is the second-largest city of Cambodia, as well as the capital and largest city of Siem Reap province in northwestern Cambodia.

Siem Reap possesses French-colonial and Chinese-style architecture in the Old French Quarter and around the Old Market. The city is a major hub for tourism in Cambodia due to its close proximity to the ancient temples of Angkor constructed during the Khmer Empire. In and around the city there are museums, traditional Apsara dance performances, a Cambodian cultural village, souvenir and handicraft shops, silk farms, rice paddies in the countryside, fishing villages and a bird sanctuary near Tonlé Sap, and a cosmopolitan drinking and dining scene.

Siem Reap was named the ASEAN City of Culture for the period 2021–2022 at the 9th Meeting of the ASEAN Ministers Responsible for Culture and Arts (AMCA) organized on 22 October 2020.

== History ==
=== Angkor period settlement of Dvijendrapura ===
During the Angkor period, according to R. C. Majumdar, Siem Reap was the site of a town called Dvijendrapura, whose former site is probably marked by the old temple of Prah Einkosei. An old stele inscription at Prah Einkosei, written in both Sanskrit and Old Khmer and dated to 890 and 892 of the Shaka era (corresponding to 968 and 970 CE), records religious endowments made by the princess Indralakṣmī (daughter of Rājendravarman II) and her husband Divākara-bhaṭṭa in those two years, including an image of Viṣṇu called Dvijendra and an āśrama. They also founded a temple at a place called Madhuvana, which Majumdar identified with present-day Prasat Komphus near Phnom Sandak. A corresponding inscription at Prasat Komphus states that the temples at Dvijendrapura and Madhuvana were jointly endowed with a commonly shared property (miśrabhoga) so that "the territories of the gods of Madhuvana and Dvijendrapura are joined together".

=== Post-Angkor period ===
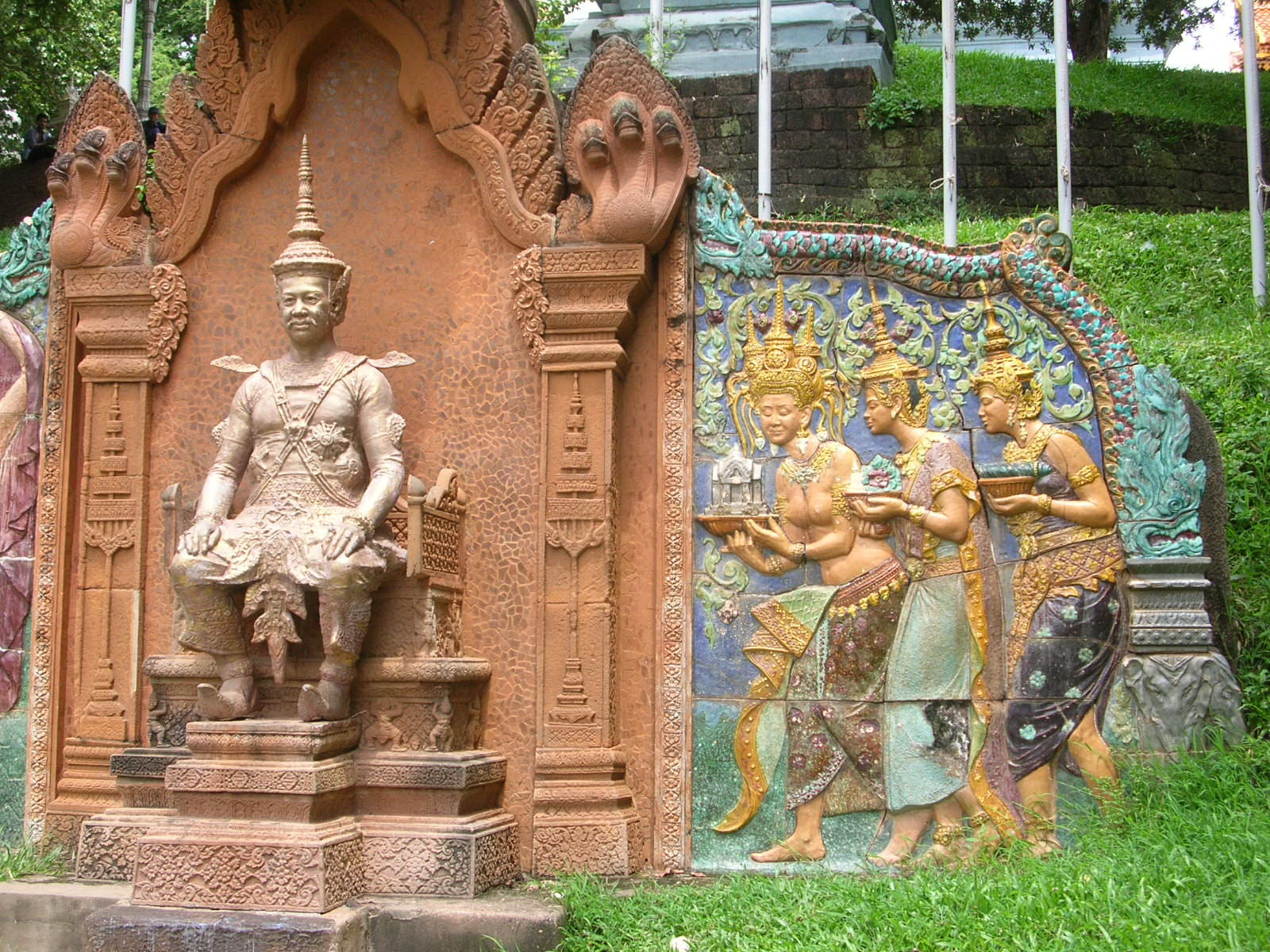
Sisophon, Battambang, and Angkor returned to King Sisowath, 1907

The name "Siem Reap" can be translated to mean 'defeat of Siam' (siem in Khmer) and is commonly taken as a reference to an incident in the centuries-old conflict between the Siamese and Khmer kingdoms, although this is probably apocryphal. According to oral tradition, King Ang Chan I (1516–1566) had named the town "Siem Reap" after he repulsed an army sent to invade Cambodia by the Thai king Maha Chakkraphat in 1549. Scholars such as Michael Vickery consider this derivation to be simply a modern folk etymology, and maintain that while the names Siem Reap and Chenla, the old Chinese name for Cambodia, may perhaps be related, the actual origin of the name is unknown.

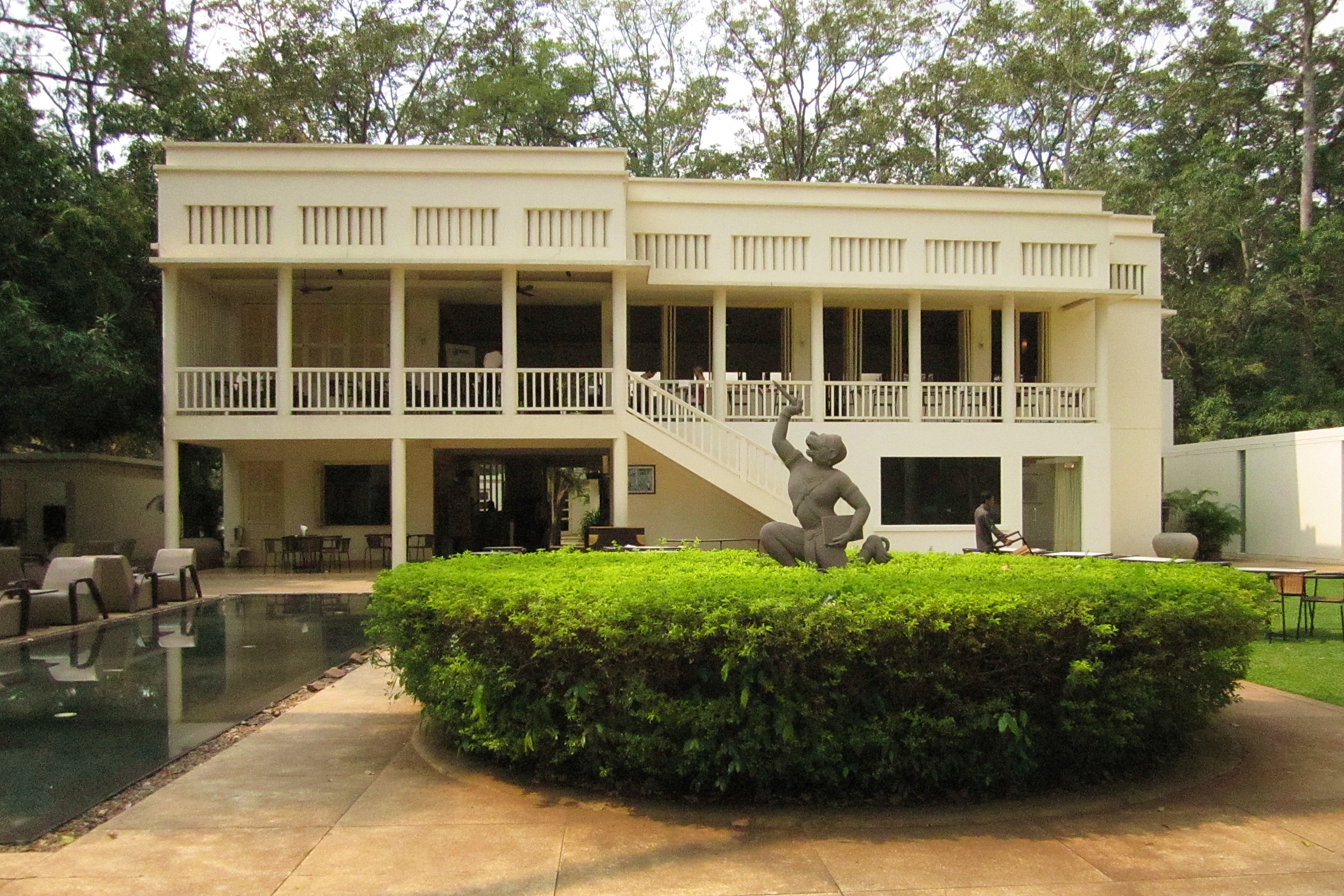
Former residence of the French governor of Siem Reap; repurposed in 2019 as the FCC Angkor hotel (an affiliate of FCC Phnom Penh)

The traditional tale claims that King Ang Chan of Cambodia tried to assert greater independence from Siam, which was then struggling internally. The Siamese king Chairacha had been poisoned by his concubine, Lady Sri Sudachan, who had committed adultery with a commoner, Worawongsathirat, while the king was away leading a campaign against the Kingdom of Lan Na. Sudachan then placed her lover on the throne. The Thai nobility lured them outside the city on a royal procession by barge to inspect a newly discovered white elephant. After killing the usurper, along with Sudachan and their new-born daughter, they invited Prince Thianracha to leave the monkhood and assume the throne as King Maha Chakkraphat (1548–1569). With the Thais distracted by internal problems, King Ang Chan attacked. He seized the Siamese city of Prachinburi in 1549, sacking the city and making slaves of its inhabitants. Only then did he learn that the succession had been settled and that Maha Chakkraphat was the new ruler. Ang Chan immediately retreated to Cambodia, taking captives with him. King Maha Chakkraphat was furious over the unprovoked attack, but Burma had also chosen to invade through Three Pagodas Pass. The Burmese army posed a much more serious threat, as it captured Kanchanaburi and Suphanburi. It then appeared before Ayutthaya itself.

The Thai army managed to defeat the Burmese, who quickly retreated through the pass. Maha Chakkraphat's thoughts then turned to Cambodia. Not only had Ang Chan attacked and looted Prachinburi, turning its people into slaves, but he also refused to give Maha Chakkraphat a white elephant he had requested, rejecting even this token of submission to Siam. Maha Chakkraphat ordered Prince Ong, the governor of Sawankhalok, to lead an expedition to punish Ang Chan and recover the Thai captives. The rival armies met, and Ang Chan killed Prince Ong with a lucky musket shot from an elephant's back. The leaderless Thai army fled, and Ang Chan allegedly captured more than 10,000 Siamese soldiers. To celebrate his great victory, King Ang Chan supposedly named the battleground "Siem Reap", meaning 'the total defeat of Siam'.

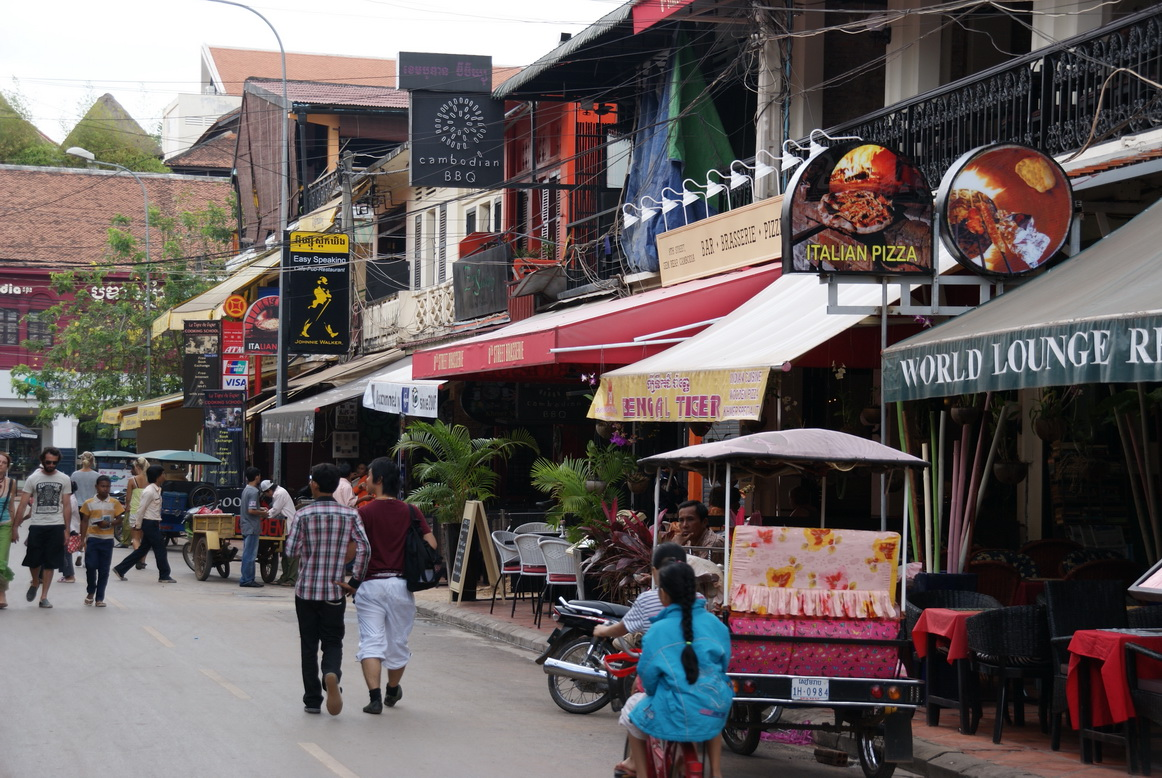
Pub Street, Siem Reap

In reality, surviving historic sources make this derivation appear unlikely, since they date the decline of Angkor to more than a century before this, when a military expedition from Ayutthaya captured and sacked Angkor Wat, which began a long period of vassal rule over Cambodia. The 1431 capture coincided with the decline of Angkor, though the reasons behind its abandonment are not clear. They may have included environmental changes and failings of the Khmer infrastructure.

From the 16th to the 19th centuries, infighting among the Khmer nobility led to periodic intervention and domination by both of Cambodia's more powerful neighbors, Vietnam and Siam. Siem Reap, along with Battambang (Phra Tabong) and Sisophon, major cities in northwest Cambodia, was under Siamese administration and the provinces were collectively known as Inner Cambodia from 1795 until 1907, when they were ceded to French Indochina.

=== "Re-discovery" of Angkor ===
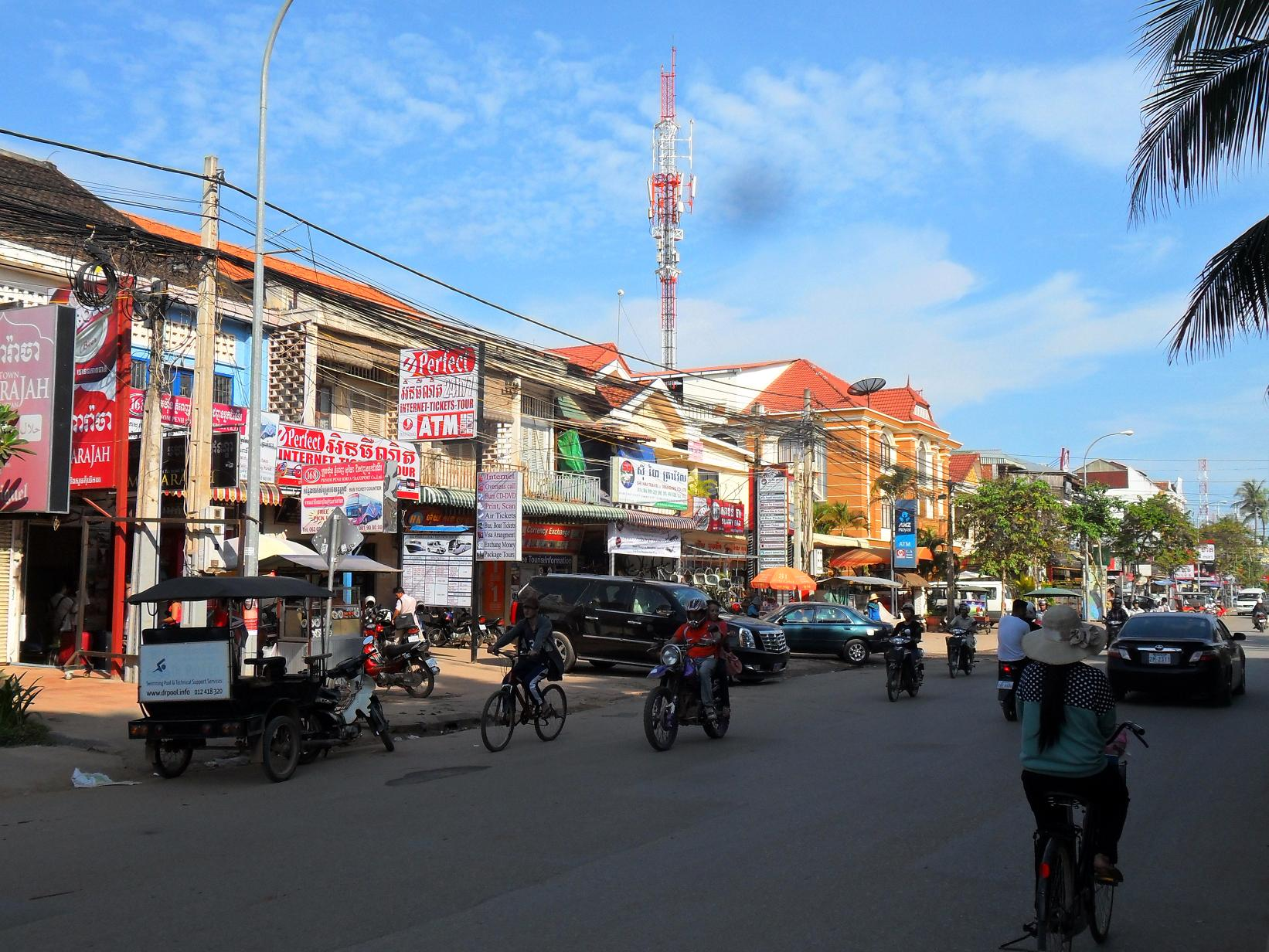
Sivutha Boulevard downtown

Siem Reap was little more than a village when French explorers such as Henri Mouhot "re-discovered" Angkor in the 19th century. However, European visitors had visited the temple ruins much earlier, including António da Madalena in 1586. In 1901, the École française d'Extrême-Orient (EFEO) ('French School of the Far East') began a long association with Angkor by funding an expedition into Siam to the Bayon. The EFEO took responsibility for clearing and restoring the whole site. In the same year, the first Western tourists arrived in Angkor, a total of about 200 in just three months. Angkor had been "rescued" from the jungle and was assuming its place in the modern world.

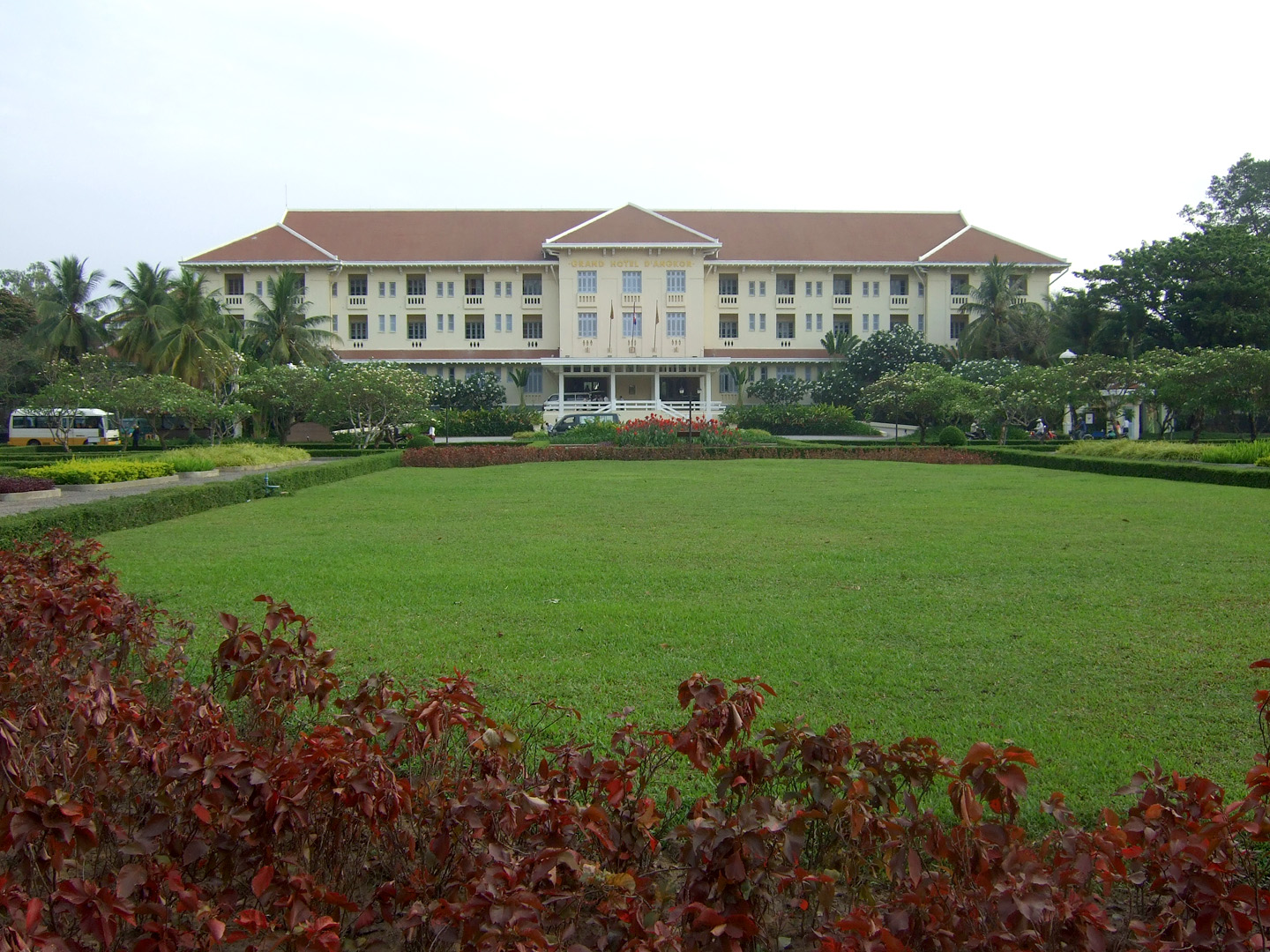
The Grand Hotel d'Angkor, built in the mid-1920s.

With the acquisition of Angkor by the French in 1907 following a Franco-Siamese treaty, Siem Reap began to grow. The Grand Hotel d'Angkor opened in 1929 and the temples of Angkor became one of Asia's leading draws until the late-1960s, when civil war kept tourists away. In 1975, the population of Siem Reap, like all other Cambodian cities and towns, was driven into the countryside by the communist Khmer Rouge.

Siem Reap's recent history is colored by the horror of the Khmer Rouge regime. Since Pol Pot's death in 1998, however, relative stability and a rejuvenated tourist industry have revived the city and province.

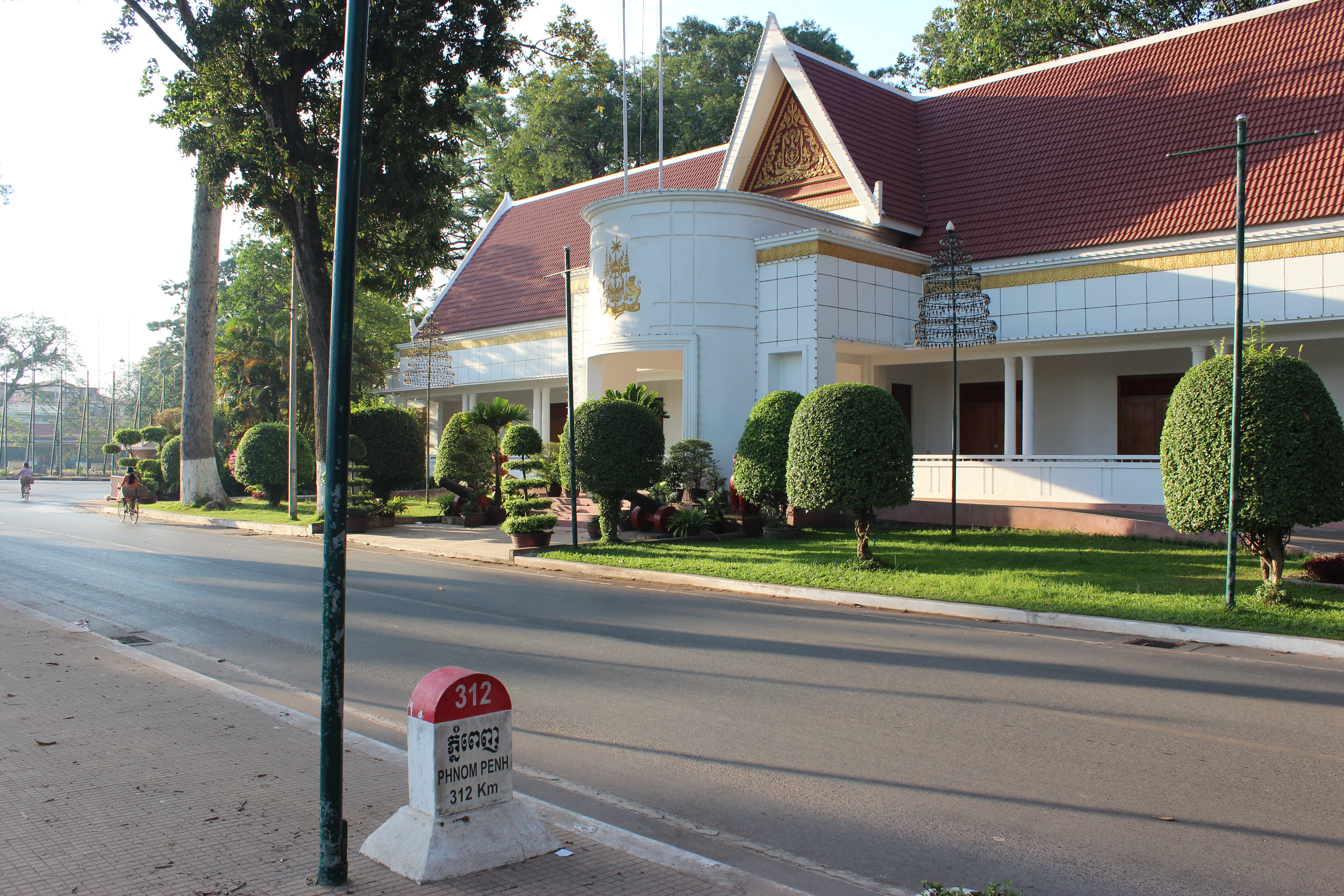
Royal Residence, Siem Reap

Siem Reap now serves as a small gateway town to the world heritage site of Angkor Wat. In recent years, the city has regularly ranked in the top ten for "Best Destination" lists produced by entities such as TripAdvisor, Wanderlust Magazine, and Travel+Leisure.

== Economy ==
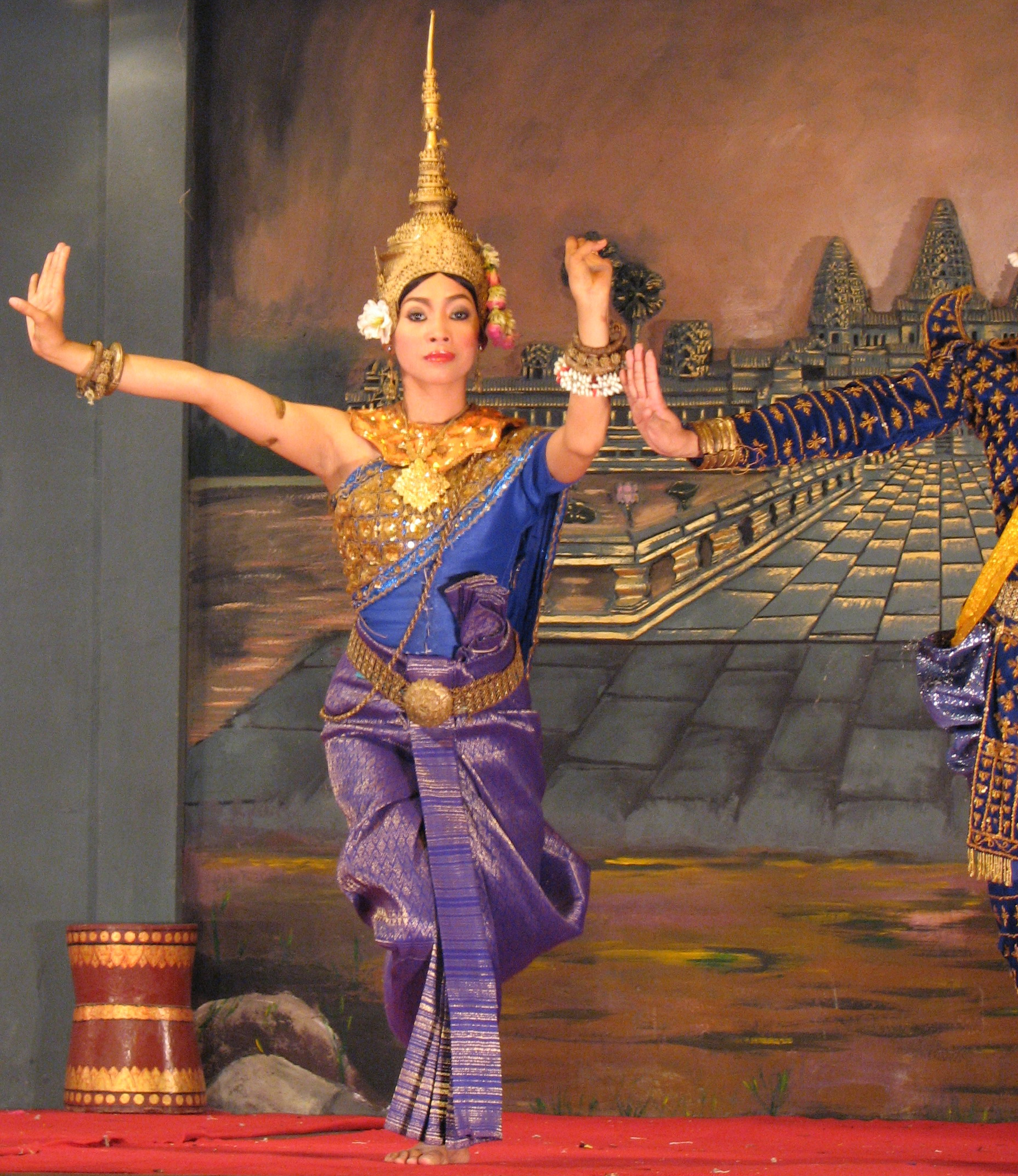
Dancer performing for tourists at a restaurant

Tourism is a very important aspect of the economy of Siem Reap: it was estimated in 2010 that over 50% of jobs in the town were related to the tourism industry. The city has seen a massive increase in tourist arrivals in the decades since the end of the Khmer Rouge era, and businesses centered on tourism have flourished due to the tourism boom. Visitor numbers were negligible in the mid-1990s, but by 2004, over half a million foreign visitors had arrived in Siem Reap Province that year, approximately 50% of all foreign tourists in Cambodia. By 2012, tourist numbers had reached over two million.

== Attractions ==
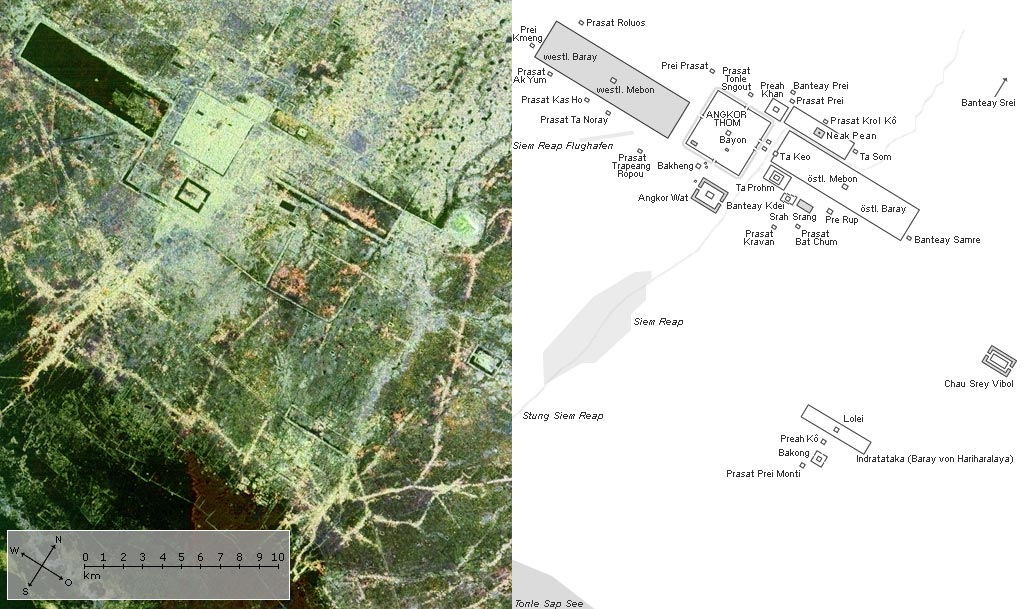
Satellite view of Siem Reap (to the left in the satellite image) in relation to Angkor archaeological sites such as Angkor Wat and Angkor Thom

=== Angkor Wat ===
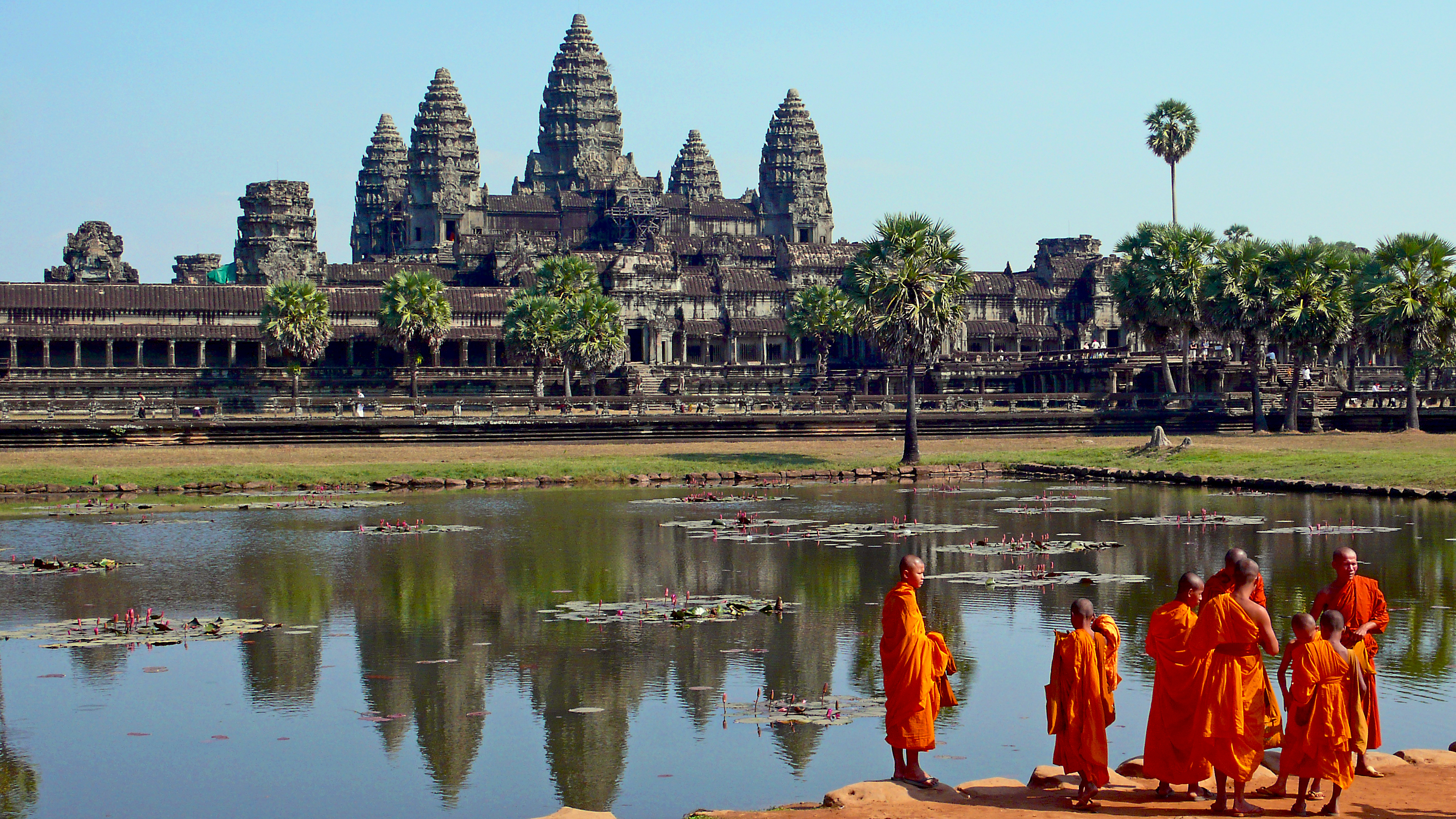
Buddhist monks in front of Angkor Wat

Angkor Wat (Wat temple) is the central feature of the Angkor UNESCO World Heritage Site, containing the remains of the Khmer civilization. Angkor Wat's rising series of five towers culminates in an impressive central tower that symbolizes the mythical Mount Meru. Thousands of feet of wall space are covered with carvings depicting scenes from Hindu mythology. The most important are the carved bas-reliefs of the Hindu narratives. They tell a story about gods fighting demons in order to reclaim order, which can only be achieved by recovering the elixir of life known as amrita. The gods and demons must work together to release it and then battle to attain it.

=== Angkor Thom ===
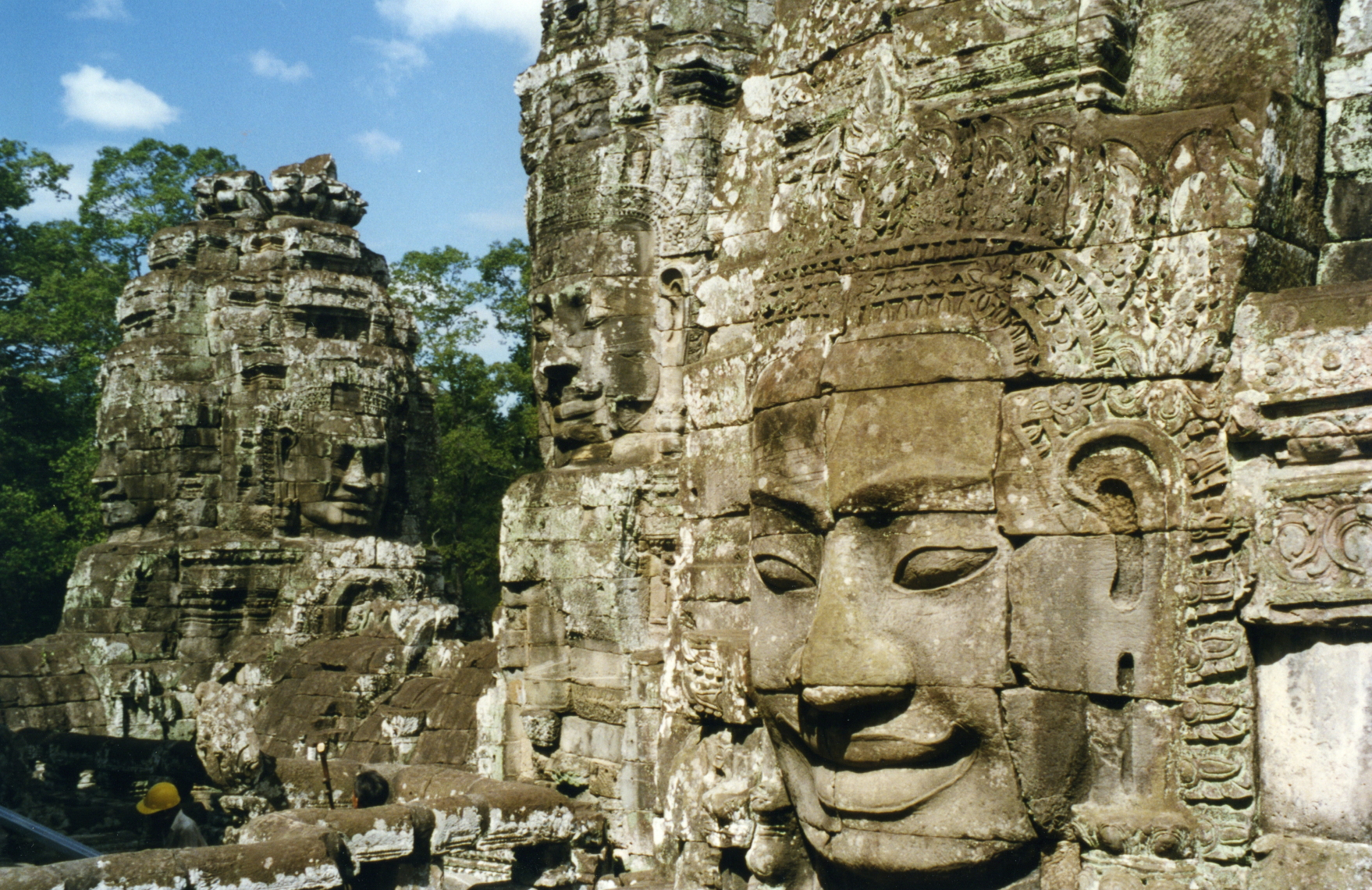
The towers of Bayon in Angkor Thom

Angkor Thom is an inner royal city built by Jayavarman VII, the Empire's famed 'Warrior King', at the end of the 12th century and is renowned for its temples, in particular the Bayon. Other notable sites are Baphuon, Phimeanakas, the Terrace of the Elephants, and the Terrace of the Leper King. The city can be accessed through five city gates, one at each cardinal point and the Victory Gate on the eastern wall.

=== Other temples ===
A number of significant temples are dotted around Angkor Wat and Angkor Thom within the Angkor Archaeological Park, including Ta Prohm, Preah Khan, Banteay Kdei, Phnom Bakheng, Ta Keo, Ta Som, East Mebon, Pre Rup, and Neak Pean. These temples may be visited along the grand circuit or the small circuit routes. Other sites are the Roluos group of temples located to the east of Siem Reap.

=== The Cambodia Landmine Museum and Relief Center ===
The Landmine Museum offers tourists and Cambodians the chance to see (safe) landmines up close, understand how they work, and what they can do to help rid Cambodia and the world of their continuing threat. It is approximately 25 km north of Siem Reap (30 minutes by tuk tuk), 7 km south of the Banteay Srey Temple complex in Angkor National Park. Some two dozen at-risk Khmer children are educated and live, along with staff, at the Relief Center on the museum property.

=== Lotus Silk Farm ===
Opened on 2023, Lotus Silk Farm is a sustainable social enterprise dedicated to reviving the ancient art of lotus silk weaving in Cambodia. The farm showcases the entire process, from harvesting lotus stems to creating exquisite fabrics. Visitors can learn about the eco-friendly production methods, witness skilled artisans at work, and even participate in workshops.

=== War Museum Cambodia ===
The War Museum Cambodia covers the last three decades of the 20th century when the Khmer Rouge was active in Cambodia. There is a vast array of vehicles, artillery, weaponry, landmines, and equipment on display. The museum is making use of guides who are war veterans who fought for the Cambodian army, the Khmer Rouge, or the Vietnamese army.

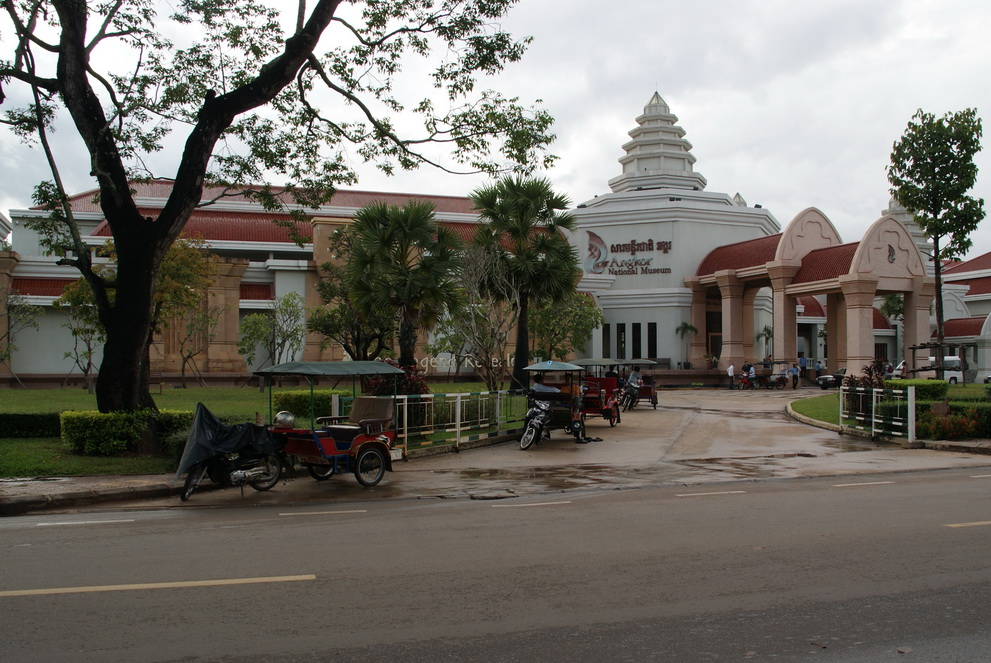
Angkor National Museum

=== Angkor National Museum ===
Opened on 12 November 2007, the Angkor National Museum offers visitors a better understanding of the area's archaeological treasures. The Golden Era of the Khmer Kingdom is presented, including the use of state-of-the-art multimedia technology. The museum covers Khmer history, civilization, and cultural heritage in eight galleries. Today, the museum is filled with expensive jewelry being sold to tourists. The museum is also popular among local tourists during special holidays especially during the Khmer New Year and Christmas time.

=== Markets ===
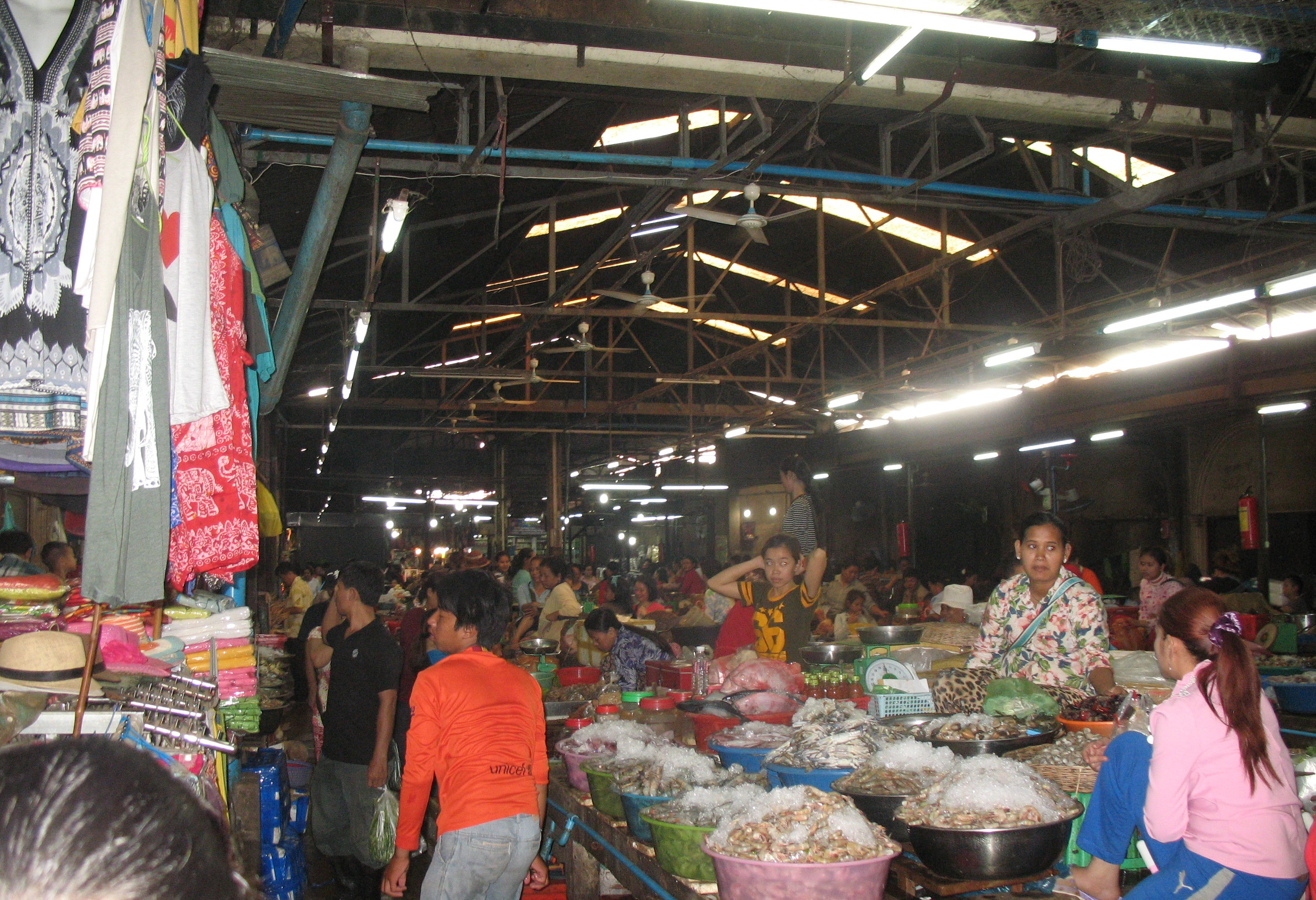
The Old Market in Siem Reap

The Old Market is between Pub Street and the Siem Reap River, and offers a mixture of souvenirs for tourists and a variety of food produce and other items meant for locals.

Other markets in Siem Reap include the Angkor Night Market which is off Sivutha Street, Phsar Kandal (the Central Market) on Sivutha Street which mainly caters to tourists, and Phsar Leu (the Upper Market) which is further away along National Road 6 but is the biggest market of Siem Reap used by the locals. The Made in Cambodia Market (initially called "Well Made in Cambodia") is a night market for tourists in Siem Reap where all the products sold are made in Cambodia. The market hosts daily shows and other events in King's Road. In July 2020, authorities issued an order banning the buying, selling and butchering of dogs for food.

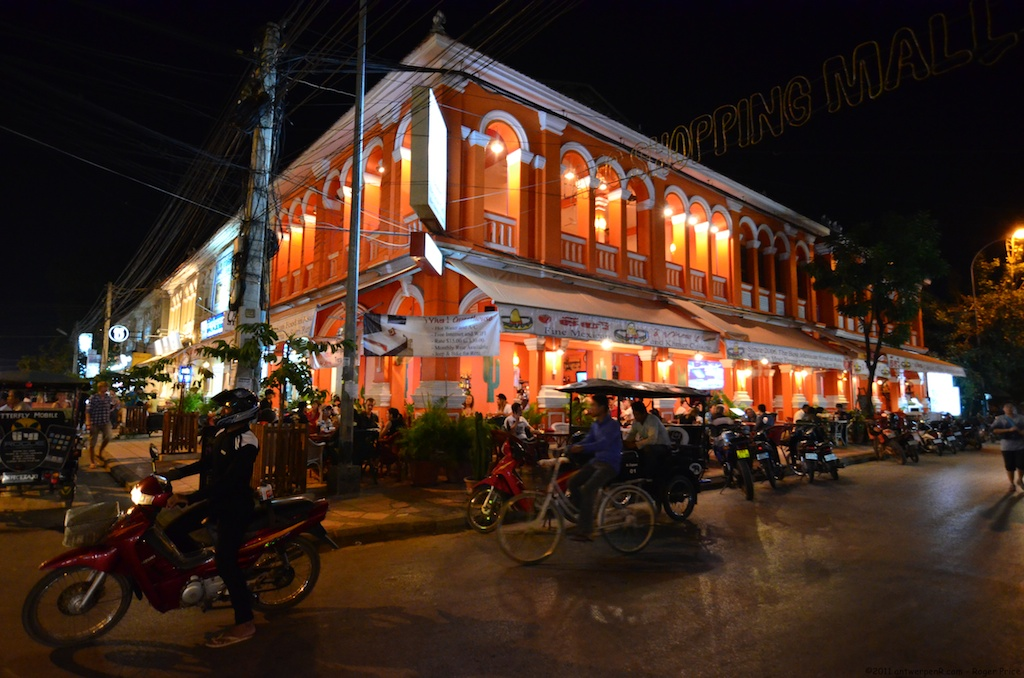
Nightlife in Siem Reap

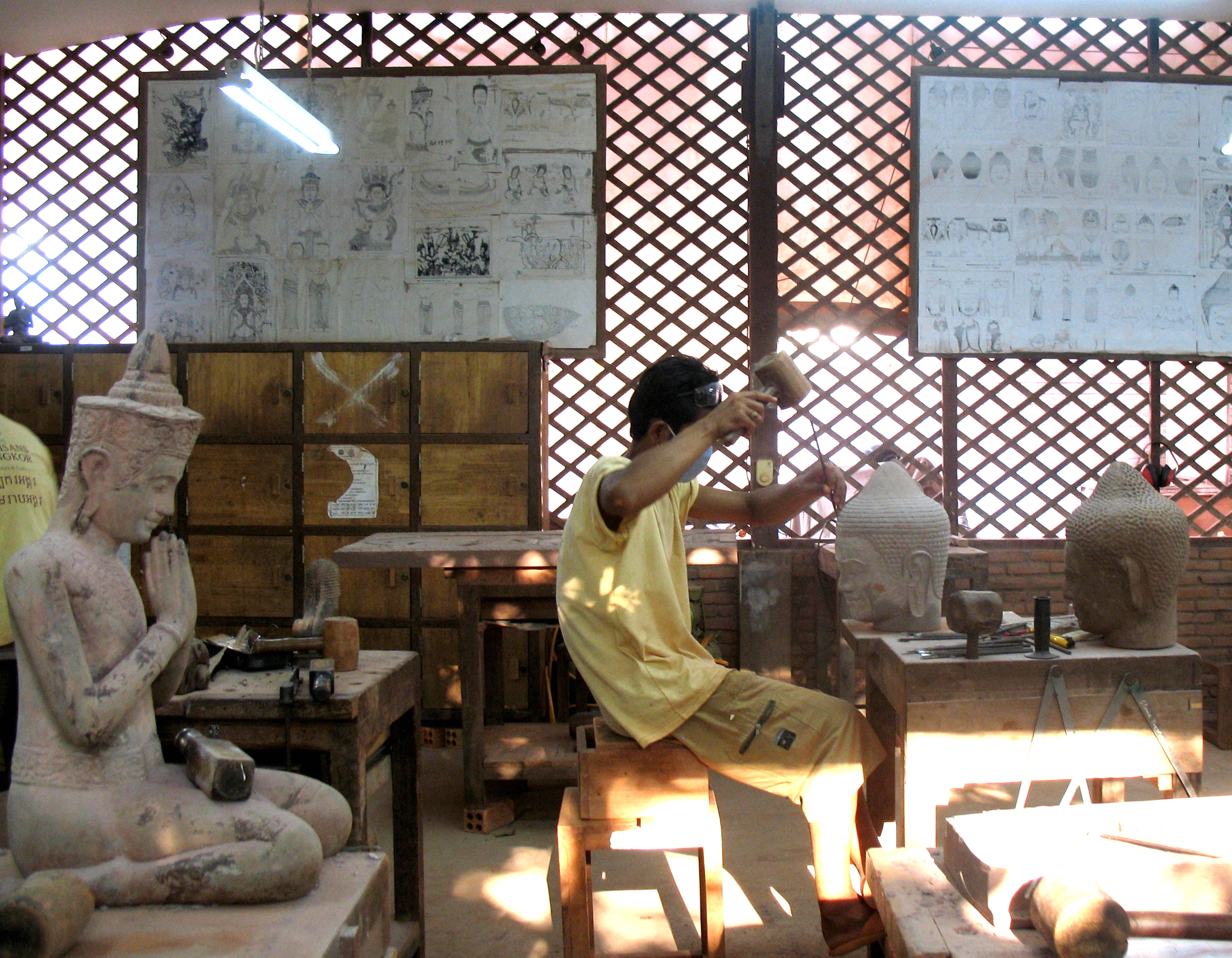
Craftsman at Artisans Angkor creating Buddha images in stone

=== Artisans Angkor ===
Artisans Angkor is a semi-public company founded in 1992 which aims to revive traditional Khmer craftsmanship and provide employment for rural artisans. It is also associated with a silk farm where visitors may learn about sericulture and weaving. It also participates in the restoration of historical Angkor sites by repairing and replacing damaged sculptures.

=== Cambodian Cultural Village ===
The Cambodian Cultural Village is closed since November 2020, due to economic and financial issues.

Opened on 24 September 2003, the Cambodian Cultural Village assembles all the miniatures of famous historical buildings and structures of Cambodia. There are 11 unique villages, which represent different culture heritages, local customs, and characteristics of 21 multi races.

=== Angkor Panorama Museum ===
The Angkor Panorama Museum is closed since December 2019, reportedly due to UN sanctions on North Korea that requires member states to send North Korean workers home in mid-December.

Opened in 2015, Angkor Panorama Museum housed a panorama mural depicting 3D scenes from the Khmer Empire. The museum was financed and built by North Korea, which will receive all profits for the first ten years, and half thereafter.

== Notable sites near Siem Reap ==
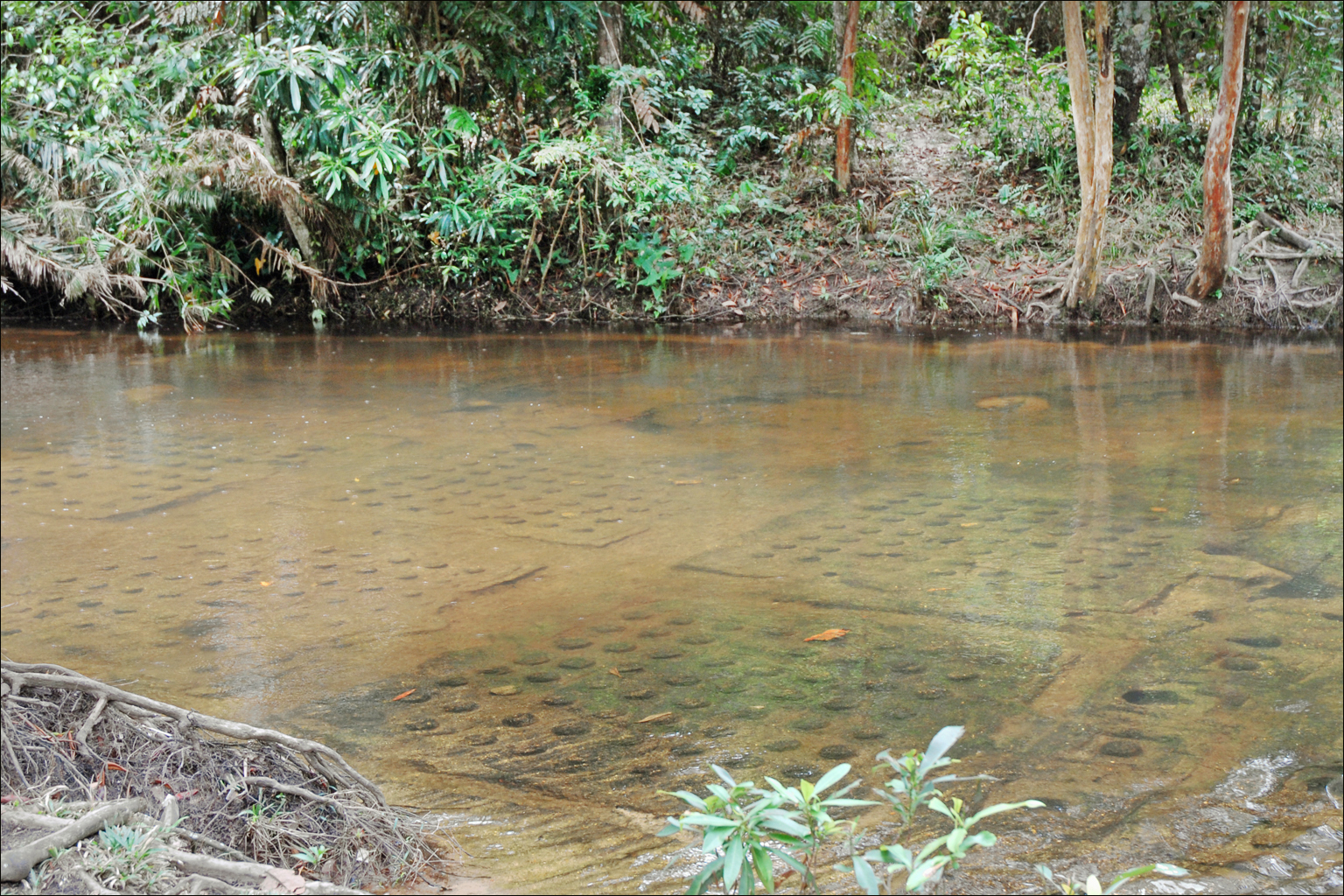
Lingas carved into the riverbed of Kbal Spean.

=== Phnom Kulen ===
Phnom Kulen National Park is about 48 km from Siem Reap and contains a number of attractions such as its two waterfalls and the Kbal Spean's 'river of 1000 lingas'. It is also home to Preah Ang Thom, an active, 16th century pagoda that is home to the largest reclining Buddha in Cambodia.

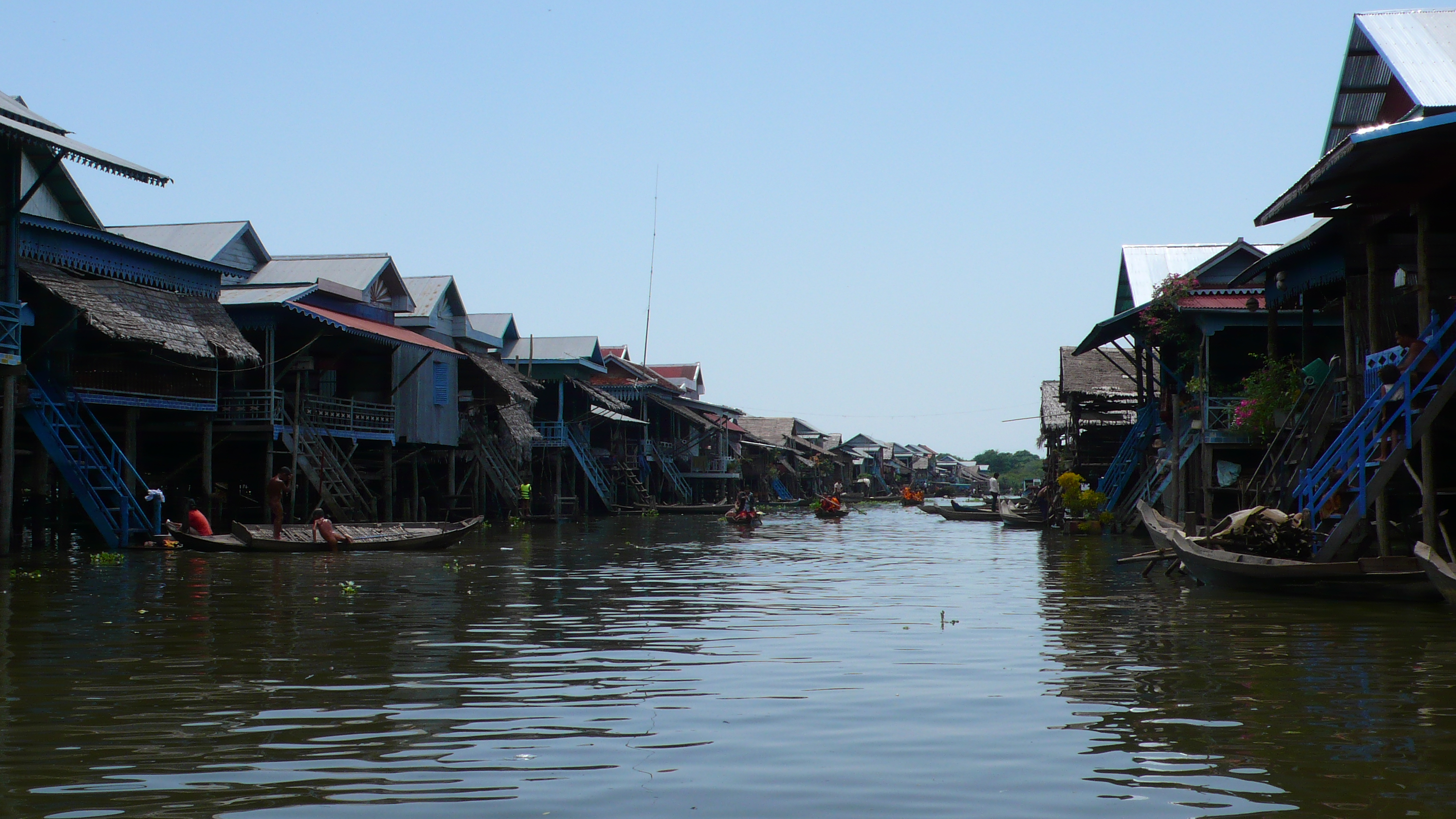
Floating Village of Kampong P'luk

=== Floating villages ===
There are four floating villages around Siem Reap: Kompong Khleang, Kompong Phluk, Chong Kneas, and Meychrey, home to a bird sanctuary. Kompong Khleang is considered the largest and most authentic, and Chong Kneas the least authentic but most visited due to its proximity to the city.

=== Tonlé Sap ===
Tonlé Sap, Khmer for 'vast body of fresh water' and more commonly translated as 'great lake', is a combined lake and river system of major importance to Cambodia. It is in the heart of Cambodia and is home to many floating villages. Tonle Sap is 30 minutes south of downtown Siem Reap at the port of Chong Kneas. The lake and its villages have many unique features and attractions, making Tonle Sap tours popular with tourists. The area around the Tonle Sap including the province of Siem Reap is part of the greater Tonle Sap Biosphere Reserve.

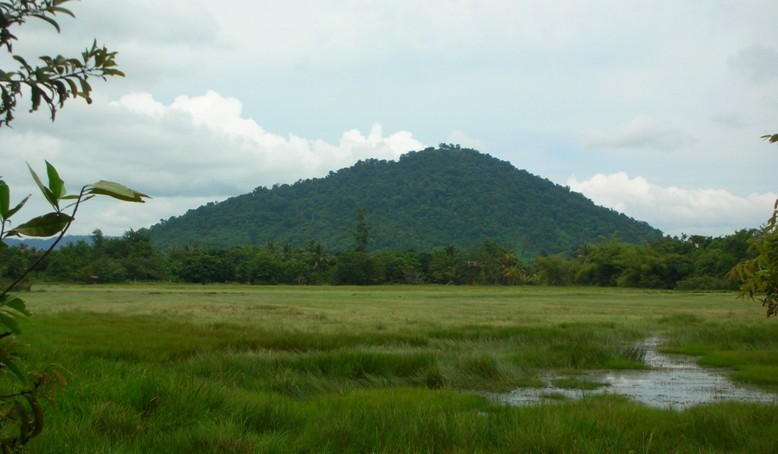
Phnom Dei

=== Phnom Dei ===
Phnom Dei is a hill near Siem Reap.

=== Banteay Srei ===
Banteay Srei is a 10th-century temple about 30 km northeast of Siem Reap. It is notable for its fine intricate decorative carvings on rose pink sandstone.

== Local specialties ==
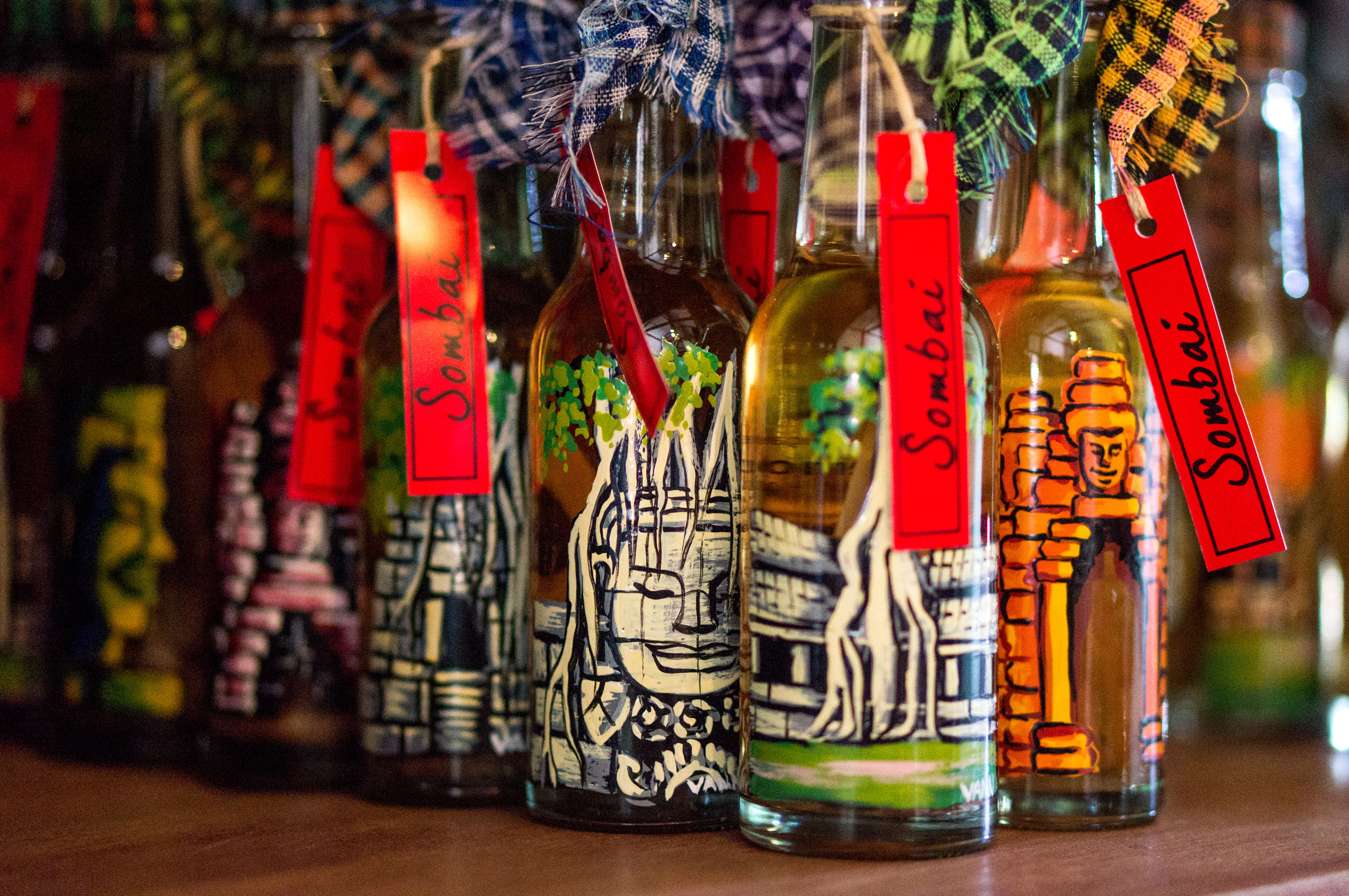
Bottles of Sombai infused rice wine with hand-painted images of Angkor temples

=== Sombai infused rice wine ===
A product that has become symbolic of Siem Riep are the Sombai premium infused rice wines drawing inspiration from the Cambodian traditional infused rice wine sraa tram (Khmer: ស្រាត្រាំ) filled in hand-painted bottles. The Sombai workshop and tasting parlour set up in the artist's Leang Seckon's house have also become a tourist attraction.

=== Prahok ===
Prahok made by the villages in Siem Reap is often regarded as the best in the country.

=== Cashew nut apples and mango brandy ===
Made in Siem Reap from cashew apples, the fruit that grows on top of the cashew nut, its 80% juice and is discarded as a by-product of cashew cultivation, and ripe yellow mangoes. '

== Climate ==
According to the Köppen climate classification, Siem Reap features a tropical wet and dry climate. The city is generally hot throughout the course of the year, with average high temperatures never falling below 30 °C or 86 °F in any month. Siem Reap has a relatively lengthy wet season which starts in May and ends in October. The dry season covers the remaining six months. The city averages approximately 1,406 millimetres or 55 inches of rainfall per year.

Climate data for Siem Reap, Cambodia (averages: 1997–2010, extremes: 1906–2010)
Month	Jan	Feb	Mar	Apr	May	Jun	Jul	Aug	Sep	Oct	Nov	Dec	Year
Record high °C (°F)	35.0 (95.0)	36.7 (98.1)	38.9 (102.0)	41.2 (106.2)	41.2 (106.2)	38.9 (102.0)	35.7 (96.3)	35.2 (95.4)	34.7 (94.5)	33.9 (93.0)	34.4 (93.9)	34.4 (93.9)	41.2 (106.2)
Mean daily maximum °C (°F)	31.7 (89.1)	33.5 (92.3)	34.9 (94.8)	35.8 (96.4)	34.8 (94.6)	33.6 (92.5)	32.9 (91.2)	32.4 (90.3)	31.7 (89.1)	31.5 (88.7)	31.2 (88.2)	30.6 (87.1)	32.9 (91.2)
Daily mean °C (°F)	26.0 (78.8)	27.8 (82.0)	29.5 (85.1)	30.5 (86.9)	29.9 (85.8)	29.2 (84.6)	28.9 (84.0)	28.8 (83.8)	28.1 (82.6)	28.0 (82.4)	26.9 (80.4)	25.6 (78.1)	28.3 (82.9)
Mean daily minimum °C (°F)	20.4 (68.7)	22.4 (72.3)	24.1 (75.4)	25.4 (77.7)	25.4 (77.7)	25.1 (77.2)	24.9 (76.8)	25.1 (77.2)	24.7 (76.5)	24.5 (76.1)	22.6 (72.7)	20.7 (69.3)	23.8 (74.8)
Record low °C (°F)	9.4 (48.9)	12.8 (55.0)	15.0 (59.0)	17.8 (64.0)	18.9 (66.0)	17.8 (64.0)	18.9 (66.0)	18.9 (66.0)	20.0 (68.0)	17.2 (63.0)	12.2 (54.0)	10.0 (50.0)	9.4 (48.9)
Average precipitation mm (inches)	3.7 (0.15)	4.7 (0.19)	29.0 (1.14)	57.3 (2.26)	149.7 (5.89)	214.1 (8.43)	192.6 (7.58)	208.9 (8.22)	287.7 (11.33)	199.6 (7.86)	51.3 (2.02)	7.3 (0.29)	1,405.9 (55.36)
Average rainy days	1.5	0.7	3.2	7.6	17.0	18.0	17.6	17.6	17.4	15.4	6.4	2.0	124.4
Average relative humidity (%)	59	59	58	59	66	70	71	73	75	75	68	64	66
Source 1: Deutscher Wetterdienst
Source 2: The Yearbook of Indochina (1932–1933)

== Transportation ==
Siem Reap-Angkor International Airport

The city is 50 kilometres (31 mi) from the new Siem Reap–Angkor International Airport, and is accessible by direct flights from many Asian cities, as well as by land from Phnom Penh and to the Thai border. The old airport is now closed, with all existing flights permanently transferred to Siem Reap–Angkor. There are buses from Phnom Penh and Battambang, with buses between Phnom Penh and Siem Reap taking about 5 hours. It is also accessible by boat (via Tonle Sap lake). The city also has a sizable tuk-tuk presence supporting mainly tourist transportation, with an estimated 6,000 drivers working as of 2019.

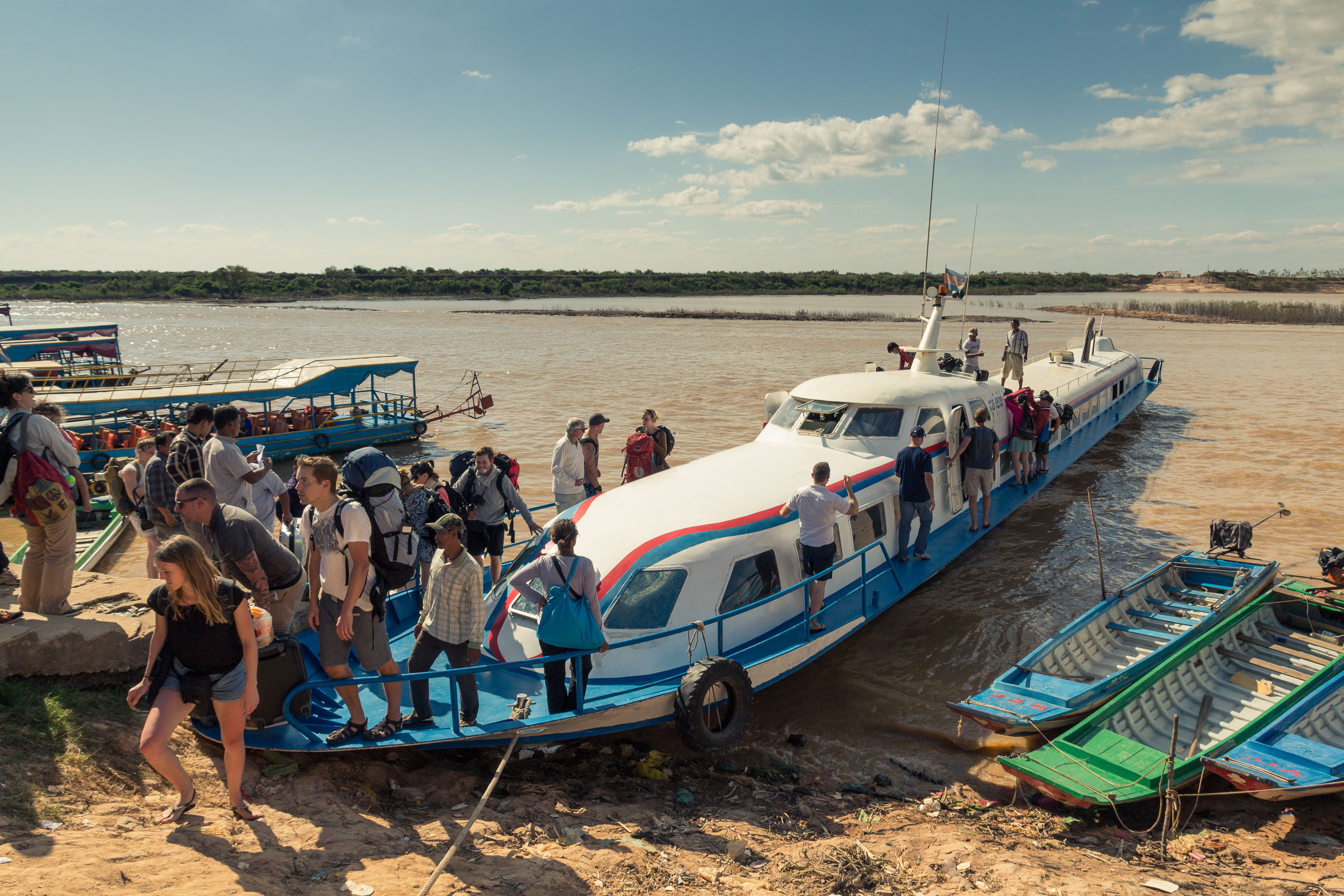
Water transport from Phnom Penh to Siem Reap

It is possible to get from Bangkok to Siem Reap via Poipet. The road from Poipet to Siem Reap is in good condition. If travelers take a taxi from Bangkok to Poipet and from Poipet to Siem Reap, it is possible to complete the whole journey in 6–10 hours, depending on border-crossing times. This journey is also possible by bus, minibus or van. Getting to Siem Reap from Bangkok is also possible by train right to the borderstation Rong Kluea market and later via shared mini-buses or taxis to Siem Reap.

A high-speed rail connection between Siem Reap and Phnom Penh is, as of 2022, in the planning stages, with feasibility studies being conducted by the China Railway Engineering Corporation.

== Notable people ==
- Dith Pran (1942–2008), photojournalist and subject of the movie The Killing Fields
- Aki Ra, soldier and CNN Hero award recipient

== Sister cities ==
- Bagan, Myanmar
- Fontainebleau, France, since 11 June 2000
- Sankt Goar, Germany, since 13 May 2015
- Jiangxi Province, China
- (United States) Orland Park, Illinois
- Kōta, Aichi, Japan
