= China Railway Group Limited =

Chinese listed construction company

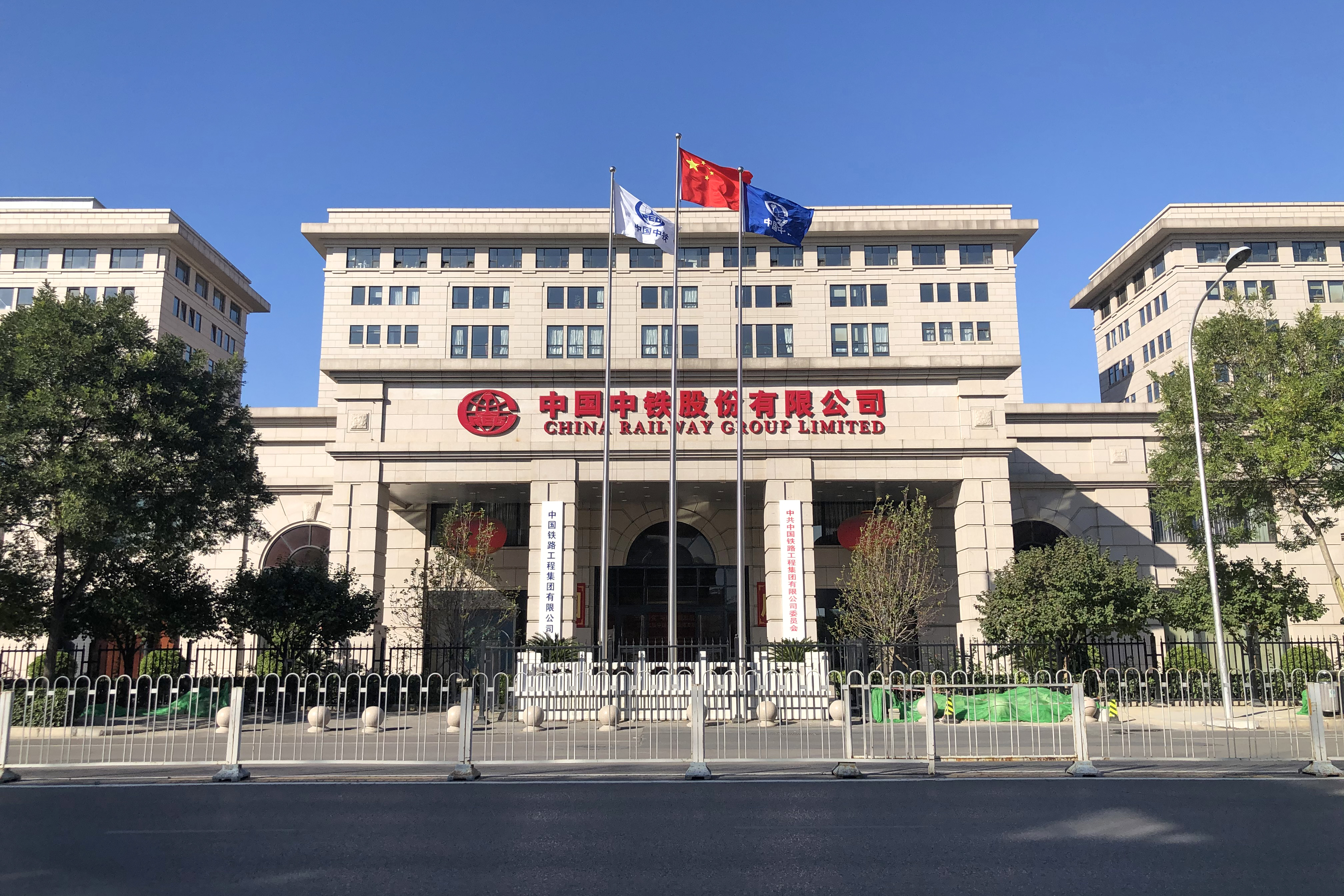
- Trade name: CREC
- Native name: 中国中铁股份有限公司 (Chinese)
- Type: Public
- Traded as: SSE: 601390 (A share); SEHK: 390 (H share); CSI A100
- Industry: Construction
- Founded: 2007
- Headquarters: Beijing, China
- Area served: Worldwide
- Key people: Chairman: Li Changjin
- Products: Railways; highways; installation; design; survey; manufacturing; real estate; resources; investments; mining
- Owner: Chinese Government (via China Railway Engineering Corporation)
- Number of employees: 282,256 (2020)
- Parent: China Railway Engineering Corporation

Chinese name
- Simplified Chinese: 中国中铁股份有限公司
- Traditional Chinese: 中國中鐵股份有限公司
- Literal meaning: China Chinese Railway Company Limited by Shares
Transcriptions
Standard Mandarin
- Hanyu Pinyin: Zhōngguó zhōngtiě gǔfèn yǒuxiàn gōngsī

Chinese short name
- Simplified Chinese: 中国中铁
- Traditional Chinese: 中國中鐵
Transcriptions
Standard Mandarin
- Hanyu Pinyin: Zhōngguó zhōngtiě
- Website: www.crec.cn

China Railway Group Limited, known as CREC (the acronym of its predecessor and parent company China Railway Engineering Corporation), is a Chinese construction company which is traded on the Shanghai and Hong Kong stock exchanges. The major shareholder of the company is the state-owned China Railway Engineering Corporation (CRECG).

By revenue, CREC is the largest construction company in the world in the 2015 Engineering News-Record "Top 225 Global Contractors". In 2016, CRECG ranks in the 57th place among Fortune Global 500 Enterprises and the 7th place among Top 500 Chinese Enterprises.

== Business areas ==
CREC holds a large share of the Chinese construction market and participates in many large-scale infrastructure projects overseas (especially in countries in Southeast Asia and Africa). In addition to the core business of construction, the company does business in surveying and designing, installation, manufacturing, R&D, technical consulting, capital management, as well as international economic and trade activities.

== History ==
In November 2007, CREC announced that it would be listing A shares and H shares on the Shanghai and Hong Kong respectively. The IPO price of A share ranged from 4 to 4.8 Chinese yuan while that of H share ranged from 5.03 to 5.78 Hong Kong dollars. CREC joined the Hang Seng China Enterprises Index from 10 March 2008.

In support of a cross country railway building boom in Venezuela, CREC began construction in 2009 of the Anaco-Tinaco railroad, an 800 million USD project to building a 471 km high speed railway line through the agriculture belt.

This company appeared to break new ground in the European Union in 2009 when the COVEC subsidiary along with two Chinese partners were awarded the tender to construct two parts of the A2 highway in Poland. The project began well in the design and preparation stages with COVEC demonstrating "technical acumen" but work ran aground at later stages because of mismanagement within a tight regulatory framework, ending in failure for COVEC and replacement by other contractors.

In 2016, the group subsidiary China Railway Engineering Equipment Group supplied the first commercial rectangular tunnel boring machine, used for an underpass of Singapore's Thomson–East Coast MRT line.

== In the media ==
The works of a CREC subsidiary active in the Democratic Republic of the Congo are the focal point of the 2011 documentary Empire of Dust. The film is directed by Belgian filmmaker Bram Van Paesschen.

On 28 March 2025 at 12:50:52 MMT (06:20:52 UTC), a 2025 Myanmar earthquake M_{w} 7.7 earthquake struck the Sagaing Region of Myanmar. This caused extensive damage in Bangkok, Thailand. These tremors led to the collapse of a 30-story building under construction for Thailand's State Audit Office (SAO) in Chatuchak district built by a joint venture between Italian-Thai Development PLC and China Railway Number 10 (Thailand) Co., Ltd., a CREC subsidiary.

== Subsidiaries ==
As of April 2020

CREC received former no.1 to 10 bureau of Ministry of Railways, which became:

- China Railway First Group Co., Ltd.
- China Railway No.2 Group Co., Ltd.
- China Railway No.3 Engineering Group Co., Ltd.
- China Tiesiju Civil Engineering Group Co., Ltd. (CTCE)
- China Railway No.5 Engineering Group Co., Ltd.
- China Railway Sixth Group Co., Ltd.
- China Railway Seventh Group Co., Ltd.
- China Railway No.8 Engineering Group Co., Ltd.
- China Railway No.9 Engineering Group Co., Ltd.
- China Railway No.10 Engineering Group Co., Ltd.
- China Railway Electrification Bureau Group Co., Ltd.

CREC also had the following subsidiaries

- China Overseas Engineering Group Co., Ltd.
- China Railway Major Bridge Engineering Group Co., Ltd.
- China Railway Electrification Engineering Group Co., Ltd.
  - China Railway Electrification Engineering Group Nanjing Co., Ltd. (30%)
- China Railway Construction Group Co., Ltd.
- China Railway Tunnel Group Co., Ltd.
- China Railway Engineering Equipment Group (CREG)
- China Railway BAOJI Bridge Group
- China Railway Science & Industry Group
- China Railway International Group Co., Ltd. (CRECGI)
- China Railway Shanhaiguan Bridge Group Co., Ltd.
- China Railway Real Estate Group Co., Ltd.
- China Railway Resources Group Co., Ltd.
- China Railway Trust Co., Ltd.
- China Railway Finance Co., Ltd.
- Yichun Luming Mining Company

former design bureau

- China Railway Eryuan Engineering Group Co. Ltd. (CREEC or CREEGC)

non-wholly owned subsidiaries that have material non-controlling interests

- Yunnan Fuyan Expressway Co., Ltd. (10%)
- Guangxi Cenxing Expressway Development Co., Ltd. (34%)
