= China Railway Engineering Corporation =

Chinese state-owned holding company

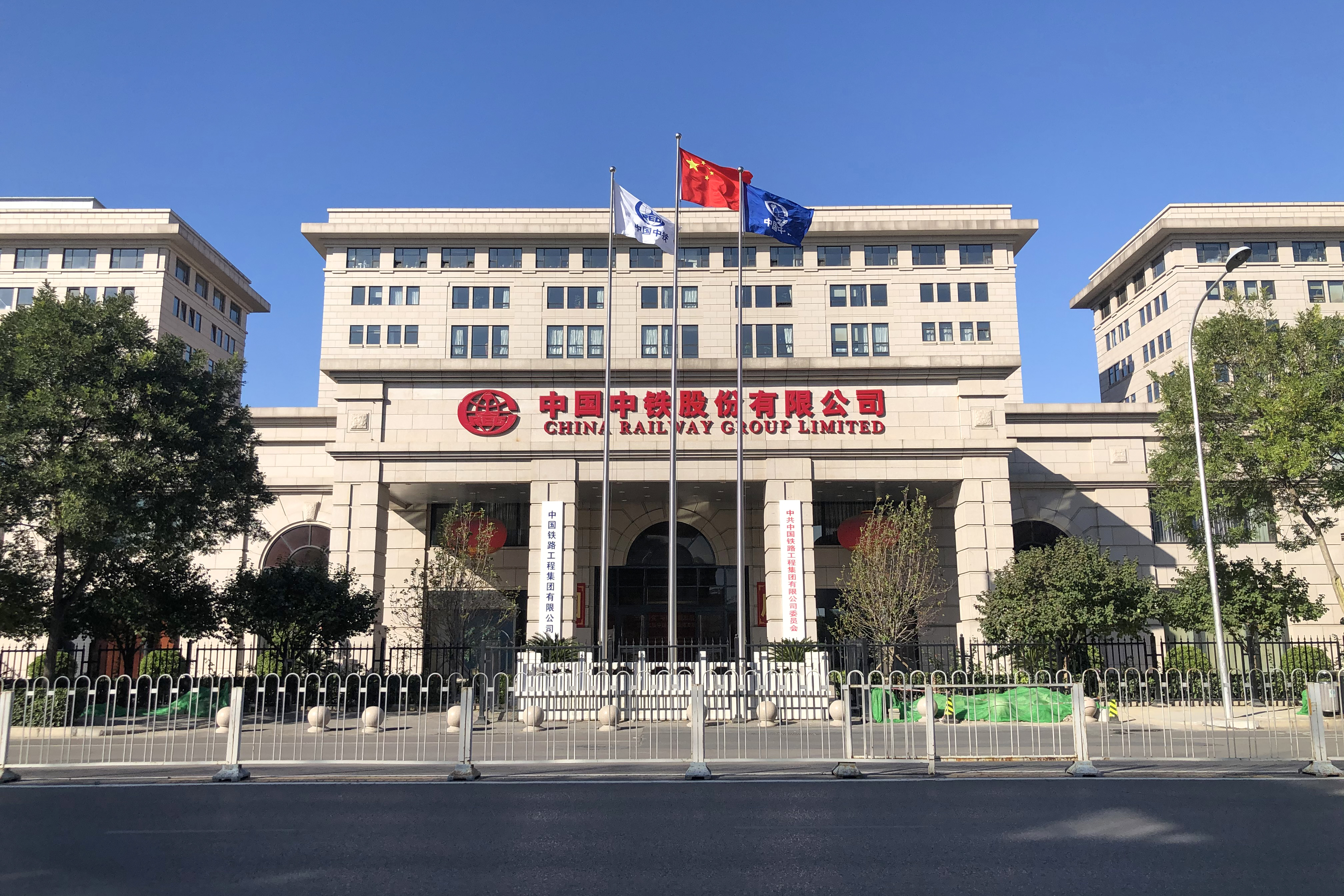
- Native name: 中国铁路工程集团有限公司
- Romanized name: Zhōngguó Tiělù Gōngchéng Jítuán Yǒuxiàn Gōngsī
- Formerly: General Bureau of Capital Construction of the Ministry of Railways (1950–1989); China Railway Engineering Company (1990–2017)
- Type: State-owned enterprise
- Industry: Civil engineering; Construction; Heavy equipment manufacturing; Mining
- Founded: 1950; 76 years ago; 1990 (as a corporate enterprise)
- Headquarters: Beijing, China
- Area served: Worldwide
- Key people: Chen Wenjian (Chairman); Zhao Dianlong (General Manager)
- Products: Tunnel boring machines & shield tunneling equipment; Railway turnouts (switches) & track components; Steel structures for bridges and transit hubs; Commercial and residential real estate; Copper, cobalt, & molybdenum minerals
- Services: General contracting & civil engineering; EPC turnkey contracting; Surveying, architectural design & consulting; Infrastructure operation & maintenance (toll roads, utilities); Financial leasing, trust & asset management
- Revenue: ▼CN¥ 1.159 trillion / US$ 160.8 billion (2024)
- Operating income: ▼CN¥ 38.64 billion / US$ 5.36 billion (2024)
- Net income: ▼CN¥ 28.51 billion / US$ 3.96 billion (2024)
- Total assets: ▲CN¥ 1.912 trillion / US$ 265.3 billion (2024)
- Total equity: ▲CN¥ 426.8 billion / US$ 59.2 billion (2024)
- Owner: SASAC (Central People's Government) (100%)
- Number of employees: 308,420 (2024)
- Subsidiaries: China Railway Group Limited (54.39%); China Railway Real Estate Group; China Railway Trust; China Railway Resources Group
- Website: www.crecg.com

China Railway Engineering Corporation
- Simplified Chinese: 中国铁路工程总公司
- Traditional Chinese: 中國鐵路工程總公司
Transcriptions

The China Railway Engineering Corporation (CREC) is a state-owned holding company of China, which is under the supervision of the State Council. The company is the major shareholder of China Railway Group Limited (CRGL), its subsidiary. CREC is one of the world's largest transportation infrastructure contractors.

== History ==
The history of the company could be traced back to 1950 which two bureaus of the Ministry of Railways were formed (Chinese: 工程总局; lit. 'construction bureau' and Chinese: 设计总局; lit. 'design bureau'). In 1958, the design bureau and the construction bureau were merged to form the General Bureau of Capital Construction of the Ministry of Railways (Chinese: 铁道部基本建设总局). From 1950 to 1990, the General Bureau was a government agency for many railway construction as well as highway bridge. A subsidiary of the General Bureau, The Major Bridge Engineering Bureau, now China Railway Major Bridge Engineering Group was said to construct over 1,000 bridges from 1953 to 2009.

In 1989, the Ministry of Railways formed China Railway Engineering Corporation (Chinese: 中国铁路工程总公司; CRECG), which held former Ministry assets. CRECG was formally registered on 7 March 1990.

In 2000, CREC was placed within the oversight of the Central Large-Scale Enterprise Work Commission. In 2003, CREC was placed under supervision of State-owned Assets Supervision and Administration Commission (SASAC), a commission of the State Council.

Numbers of former subsidiary of CRECG were now belongs to CRCCG, such as China Railway First Survey and Design Institute Group.

In 2006, Shi Dahua became the Chairman and Party Secretary of CREC. Shi oversaw limited diversification of CREC's core business (constructing transportation infrastructure and municipal projects) into the related areas of real estate, trade, and logistics. During Shi's tenure, CREC transferred, restructured, or sold, almost 100 subsidiaries unrelated to its core business. As part of its limited diversification, CREC created the subsidiary China Railway Real Estate Group. CREC focused primarily on China's domestic market, but Shi increased its international business as well.

During Shi's tenure, CREC acquired 22 railway construction SOEs. These acquisitions increased CREC's assets by 25%.

In 2007, CREC created the subsidiary China Railway Group Limited and listed some of its shares for sale on the Hong Kong Stock Exchange and the Shanghai Stock Exchange the next year.

In 2010, Shi was appointed to SASAC's board of supervisors and left CREC. Li Changjin became the Chairman and Party Secretary of CREC. Li maintained his predecessor's limited diversification policy and oriented CREC's business more to the international side. As part of its diversification, CREC expanded into the areas of airport construction, finance, hydropower, and dredging.

During his tenure, Li has overseen a trend towards flattening out CREC's organizational structure, shortening the lines of authority between the CREC holding company and its subsidiaries.

In 2013, CREC established the subsidiary China Railway International Group Limited, which became CREC's main platform for international business.

Li Changjin's tenure at CREC ended in 2019.

During the Russo-Ukrainian war, CREC was added to Ukraine's International Sponsors of War list for continuing its operations in Russia. While numerous global corporations scaled back or fully exited the Russian market in response to the war and subsequent international sanctions, CREC chose to maintain its presence. Research conducted by the Yale School of Management categorized CREC in the "Grade F" tier of "Digging In," indicating its refusal to reduce or terminate activities in Russia.

CREC is a leading developer of transportation infrastructure both domestically and in other countries. As of 2024, it is the second-largest global infrastructure contractor in the world.

== Selected projects ==
- Cambodia CRECG with Ministry of Public Works and Transport planned the Siem Reap–Phnom Penh–Doun Kaev–Kampot High Speed Railway.
- Jordan China Railway Engineering Corporation with Ministry of Transport of Jordan planned the Amman Metro.
- Thailand A joint venture between Italian Thai Development and a CRECG subsidiary planned the construction of a new State Audit Office headquarter that collapsed during the 2025 Myanmar earthquake
