= China Railway Seventh Group =

Chinese civil engineering company

China Railway Seventh Group Co. Ltd
- Native name: 中铁七局集团有限公司
- Industry: Civil engineering
- Headquarters: Zhengzhou, Henan, China
- Website: www.crsg.cn

China Railway Group Limited
- Simplified Chinese: 中铁七局集团有限公司
- Traditional Chinese: 中鐵七局集團有限公司
Transcriptions

The China Railway Seventh Group (CRSG) is a subsidiary of the construction conglomerate, China Railway Group Limited (China Railway Engineering Corporation).

== International projects ==
In overseas projects, the company has operations in Africa and Saudi Arabia. In West Africa, it is active in Guinea, Mali, Senegal, and Sierra Leone, and operates in other parts of the continent in Tanzania, Mozambique, and Zambia. In these countries the CRSG has been heavily involved in bridge building, including the Dinghiraye and Niger Bridges in Guinea, the Medinandiathbe River in Senegal, the Mpiji Bridge and Ruvu Bridge in Tanzania, and the Gao Bridge in Mali. It is also active in Bolivia.

In Sierra Leone, the company started work in December 2011 on the Regent to Grafton and Kossor Town road, using $US 30 million in development assistance funds from the Chinese government. Other major projects include construction of the 35 km Makeni-Matotoka highway, the 65 km Bo-Kenema Highway, 62 km Port Loko-Lungi axis, and major urban thoroughfares, including the Wilkinson Road and Spur Road. At the ceremony to open construction, Sierra Leone President Ernest Bai Koroma praised CRSG for being "honest people, competent people, and a trustworthy company".
