= Phnom =

Phnom (Khmer: ភ្នំ), occasionally transliterated as Phnum, is a Khmer word that means 'hill' or 'mountain'. It may refer to:

== Geography ==
- Phnom Penh, capital of Cambodia
- Phnom Aural
  - Phnom Aural Wildlife Sanctuary
- Phnom Bakheng
- Phnom Bok
- Phnom Chhnork
- Phnom Da
- Phnom Dei
  - Phnom Dei Commune
- Phnom Doh Kromom
- Phnom Kmoch
- Phnom Kong Rei
- Phnom Krom
  - Phnom Krom railway
- Prasat Phnom Krom
- Phnom Kulen
  - Phnom Kulen National Park
- Phnom Malai
- Phnom Nam Lyr
  - Phnom Nam Lyr Wildlife Sanctuary
- Phnom Samkos
  - Phnom Samkos Wildlife Sanctuary
- Killing caves of Phnom Sampeau
- Phnom Sampov
- Phnom Santuk
- Phnom Sorsia
- Phnom Srok (town)
- Phnom Srok district
- Phnom Sruoch District
- Phnom Tamao Wildlife Rescue Centre
- Phnom Tumpor
- Phnom Voar
- Wat Ek Phnom
