= East Pond =

East Pond may refer to:

- East Pond, The Royal Palace, Angkor Thom, Cambodia
- East Pond (Ontario), a lakes in Ontario, Canada
- East Pond, one of the Belgrade Lakes in Maine, U.S.
- East Pond, Piscataquis County, a lakes in Maine, U.S.
- East Pond, Acushnet, Massachusetts, U.S.
- East Pond (Eagle Bay, New York), U.S.
- East Pond, Fallsburg, New York, U.S.
- East Pond, Jamaica Bay Wildlife Refuge, New York City, U.S.
- East Pond (Old Forge, New York), U.S.
- East Pond (Thendara, New York), U.S.

== See also ==
- East Pond Plantation, original name of Newport, Maine, U.S.
