= Twitchell =

Twitchell (also spelled Twichell) is a surname, and may refer to:

- Chase Twichell, American poet
- Jenny Twitchell Kempton (1835–1921), American operatic contralto
- Rev. Dr. Joseph Twichell, New England reverend, friend of Mark Twain
- Karl Twitchell, American engineer and surveyor
- Kent Twitchell, American artist
- Mark Twitchell, Canadian filmmaker convicted of murder
- Marshall H. Twitchell, Louisiana state senator and carpetbagger during the Reconstruction Era in the United States
- Paul Twitchell, American religious leader
- Ralph Twitchell, American architect
- Wayne Twitchell, American baseball player

== See also ==
- Twitchell Reservoir, in California
- Twitchell Creek, in New York
- Twitchell Lake (disambiguation)
- Twitchell Mountain, in New York
- Twitchett
- Twichell, a dialect term for an alley
- Commonwealth v. Twitchell
- The dictionary definition of twitchel at Wiktionary
