= Phnom Dei =

Hill in Siem Reap, Cambodia

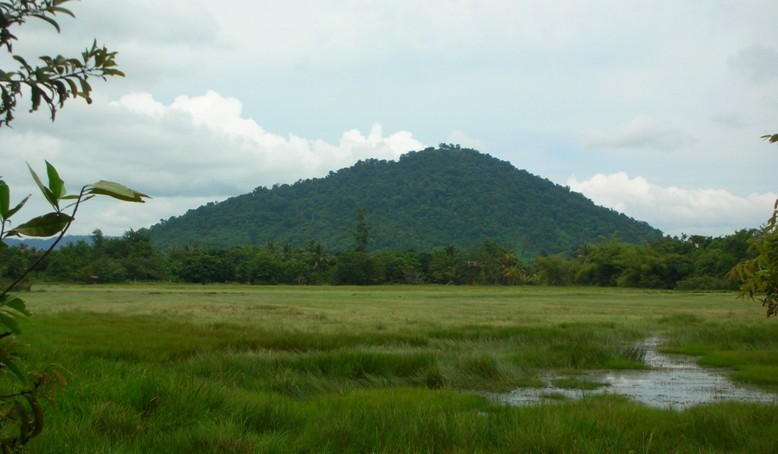
- View of Phnom Dei

Highest point
- Elevation: 272 m (892 ft)
- Coordinates: 13°35′45″N 103°59′1″E

Naming
- Native name: ភ្នំដី

Geography
- Location within Cambodia
- Location: Siem Reap Province, Cambodia

Geology
- Mountain type: Sandstone

Climbing
- Easiest route: Drive to Banteay Srei, then hike

Phnom Dei (Khmer: ភ្នំដី [pʰnom ɗəj]) is a 272 m high hill close to Siem Reap, Cambodia.

== Location ==
Phnom Dei is located to the southeast of the Banteay Srei, one of the major Angkorian temples, and south of Phnom Kulen. It is part of the temple complex in Angkor, the area that was the capital of the Khmer Empire.

== Angkorian temple ==
There is a temple on top of the hill that was built during the reign of King Yasovarman I (889-910 AD).

Phnom Dei is only one of the hilltop temples built during King Yasovarman I's reign, the others being Phnom Bakheng, Phnom Bok and Phnom Krom.
