= Prasat Phnom Krom =

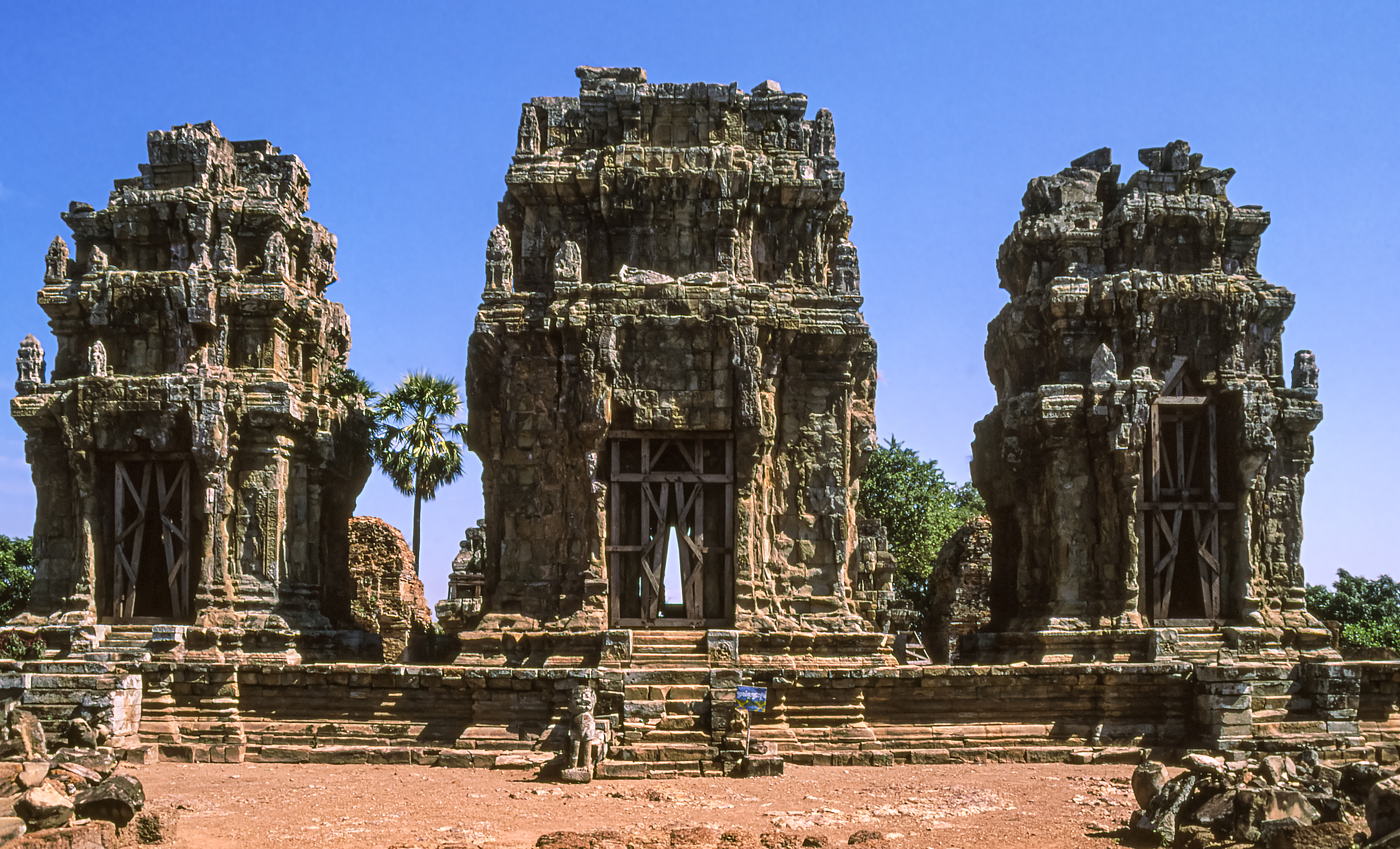
- View of Phnom Krom temple

- Location in Cambodia

Religion
- Affiliation: Hinduism
- Province: Siem Reap
- Deity: Shiva, Vishnu and Brahma

Location
- Location: On Phnom Krom hill, about 10km southwest of Siem Reap
- Country: Cambodia
- Interactive map of Prasat Phnom Krom
- Coordinates: 13°17′08″N 103°48′44″E

Architecture
- Type: Khmer (Bakheng style)
- Creator: Yasovarman I
- Completed: Late 9th to early 10th century AD
- Temple: 3 towers

Prasat Phnom Krom (Khmer: ប្រាសាទភ្នំក្រោម, lit. "downstream hill temple") is an Angkorian temple located on top of Phnom Krom in Siem Reap, Cambodia. The temple was built at the end of the 9th century, during the reign of King Yasovarman (889 A.D.-910 A.D.) and is dedicated to Shiva, Vishnu and Brahma.

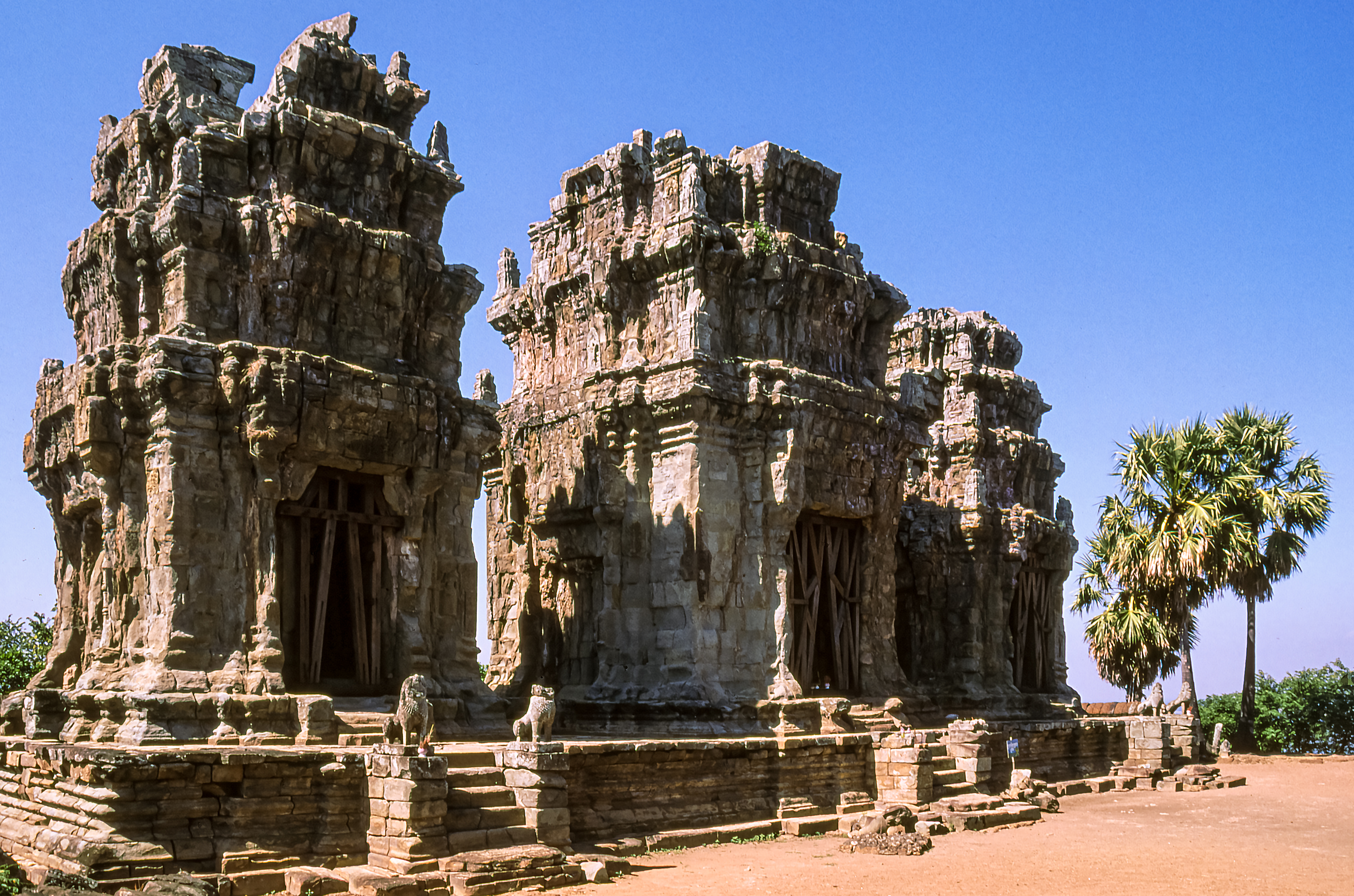

Oriented toward the east, the hilltop temple is enclosed by a wall built of laterite blocks. A cornice runs along the top of the walls. Gates bisect the walls at each of the four cardinal directions. Just inside the east gate are four small buildings arrayed in a north-south row, possibly formerly used as crematoria. Inside the walls on the north and south sides are three halls, now collapsed.

The temple's focus is three towers, also in a row running north to south. They sit atop a platform reached by staircases of seven steps. The south tower is dedicated to Brahma, the central to Shiva, and the north to Vishnu. Its layout is identical to Phnom Bok which must have been built at the same time.

They were built of sandstone; much of their carving and detail has been lost to erosion including the lintels, in very poor condition, that feature garlands and inward-facing makaras. Octagonal colonettes decorate the doorways.

Phnom Krom is the southernmost of three hilltop temples built in the Angkor region during the reign of Yasovarman. The other two are Phnom Bakheng and Phnom Bok.

== See also ==
- Phnom Krom
