= The Royal Palace, Angkor Thom =

The Royal Palace
- Location in Cambodia
- 13°26′44″N 103°51′21″E
- Type: Archaeological site
- Periods: Middle ages
- Location: Siem Reap, Cambodia
- Region: Southeast Asia
- Part of: Angkor Thom

History
- Built: 11th to 13th century AD
- Built by: Suryavarman I and others
- Abandoned: 16th century AD

Site notes
- Length: 585 m (1,919 ft)
- Width: 246 m (807 ft)
- Area: 14.4 ha (36 acres)
- Circumference: 1662 m
- Architectural style: Bakheng to Bayon
- Condition: Ruined
- Public access: Ticket required for foreigners

The Royal Palace was first built by king Suryavarman I and used continuously from the 11th to the late 16th century AD. During that period, the area was transformed and restored several times. Recent excavations have revealed many remains, such as a 10th-century temple which was built by a minister to Yasovarman I, was probably considered to be this minister's residence.

Most of the royal palace buildings were constructed by using perishable materials because they would have been non-religious in nature.

== Plan ==
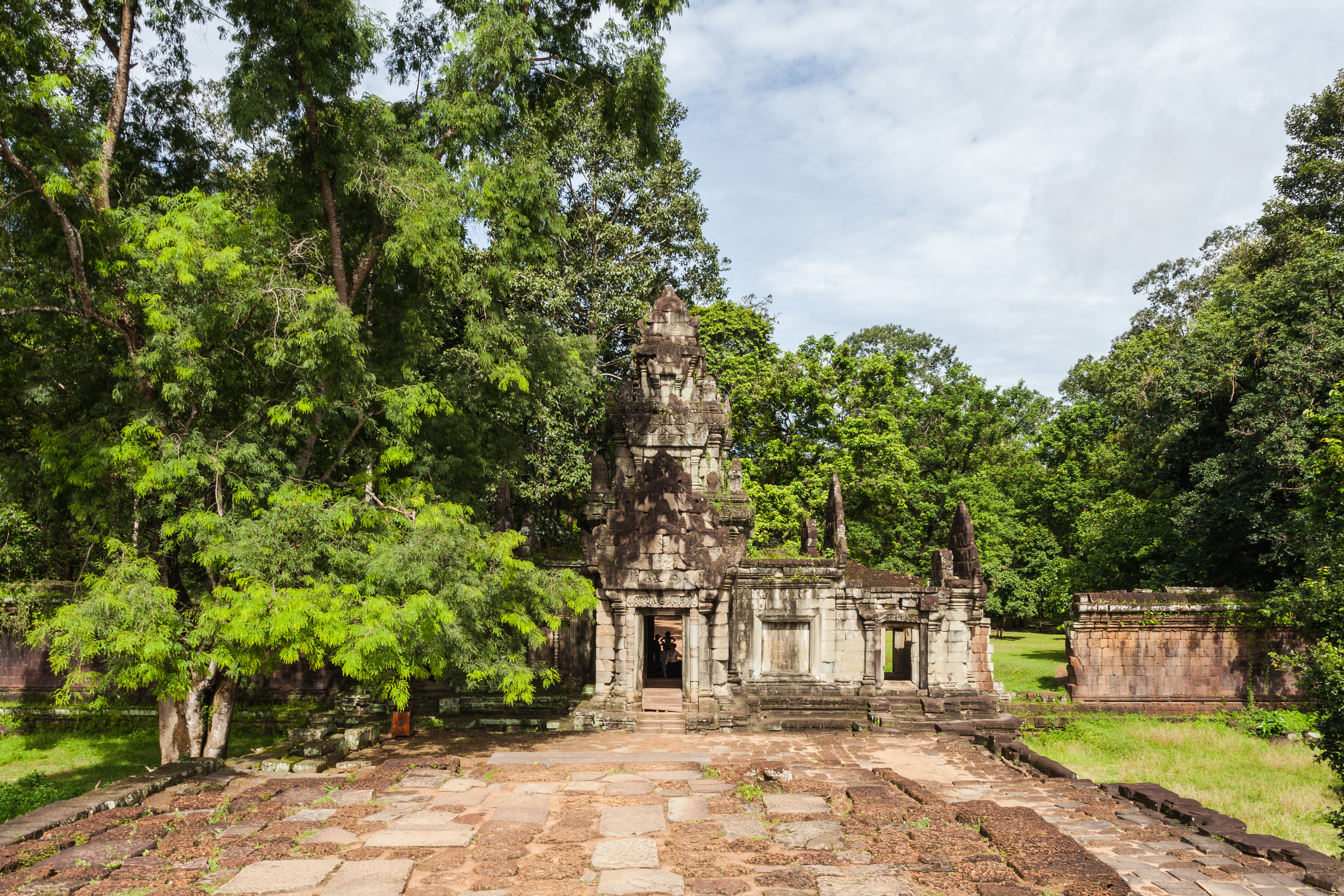
East gopura of the Royal Palace

The rectangular place of the royal palace was surrounded by a 5 meters high laterite wall with 246 meters along the north-south axis and 585 meters along the east-west axis, covering an area of more than 14 hectares. Five sandstone gopuras with steps served as the entrance to the palace. Two gupuras are located on the south, other two are on the north, the largest one faces to the east and aligned with the Elephant Terrace and Victory Gate. The first group of buildings, built by king Suryavarman I, was surrounded by a moat on the east. The ground inside the palace compound is 1.2 meters higher than outside that necessitating a double course of stone on the exterior of the entrances and in some places, the ground has been raised even higher.

== The Large Pond ==
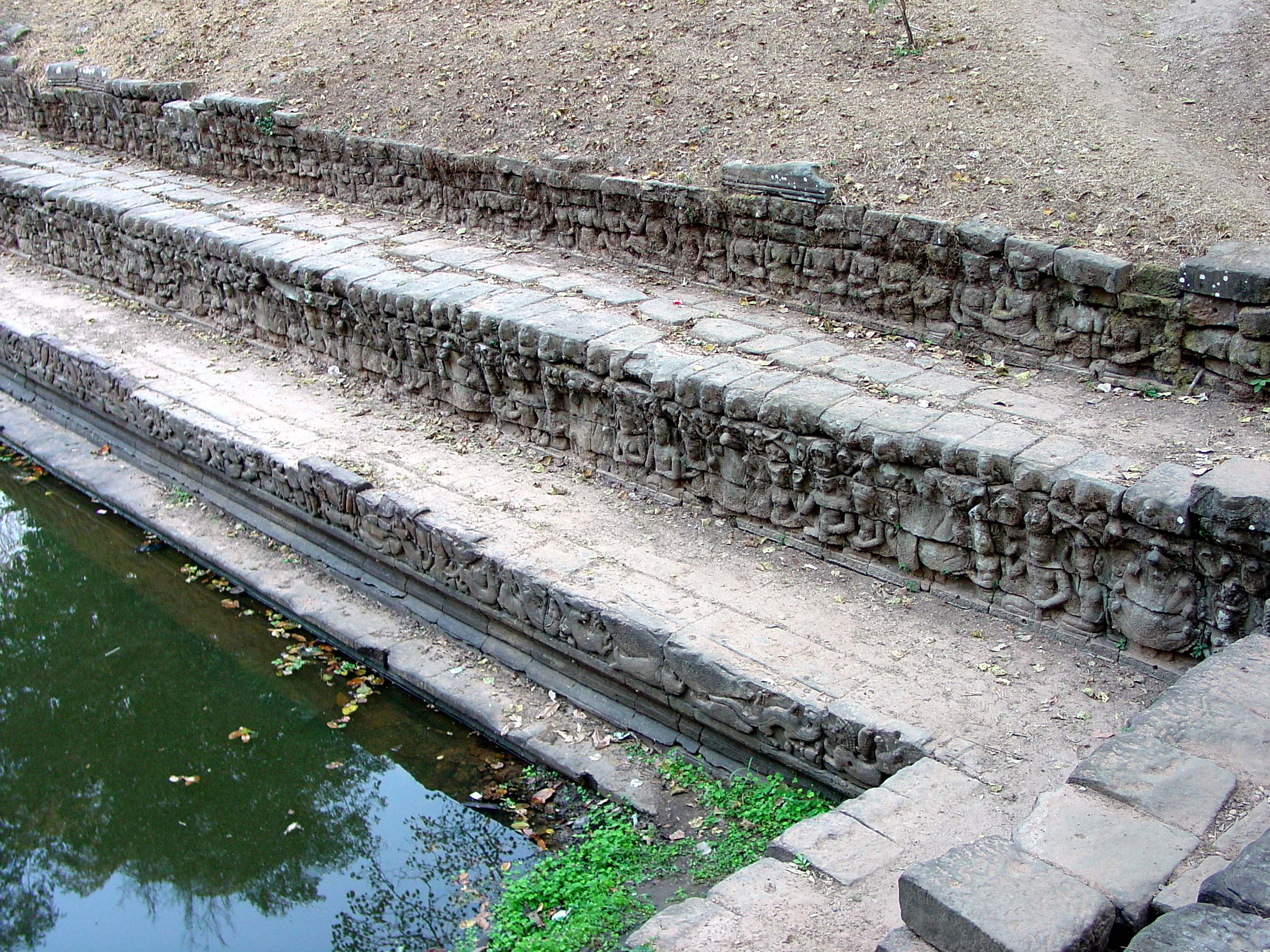
Large Pond with carving sandstone embankment

The 5625 square meters pond, probably built by king Jayavarman VIII, is faced with sandstone around its circumference. 13 tiers of steps descend 5.32 meters to the laterite paving. A wall was built on the south and to a lesser extent on the west which probably retain the embankment that extends to the pond from Phimeanakas. Dominating the pond on top of the wall is a paved terrace.

The walls are completely carved with bas-reliefs the lower sections show marine lives, heads of cow or horse, There are two rows of princes and naga princesses in the middle part which is similar to Terrace of the Leper King that located above winged figures, male and female guardian figures.

== The East Pond ==
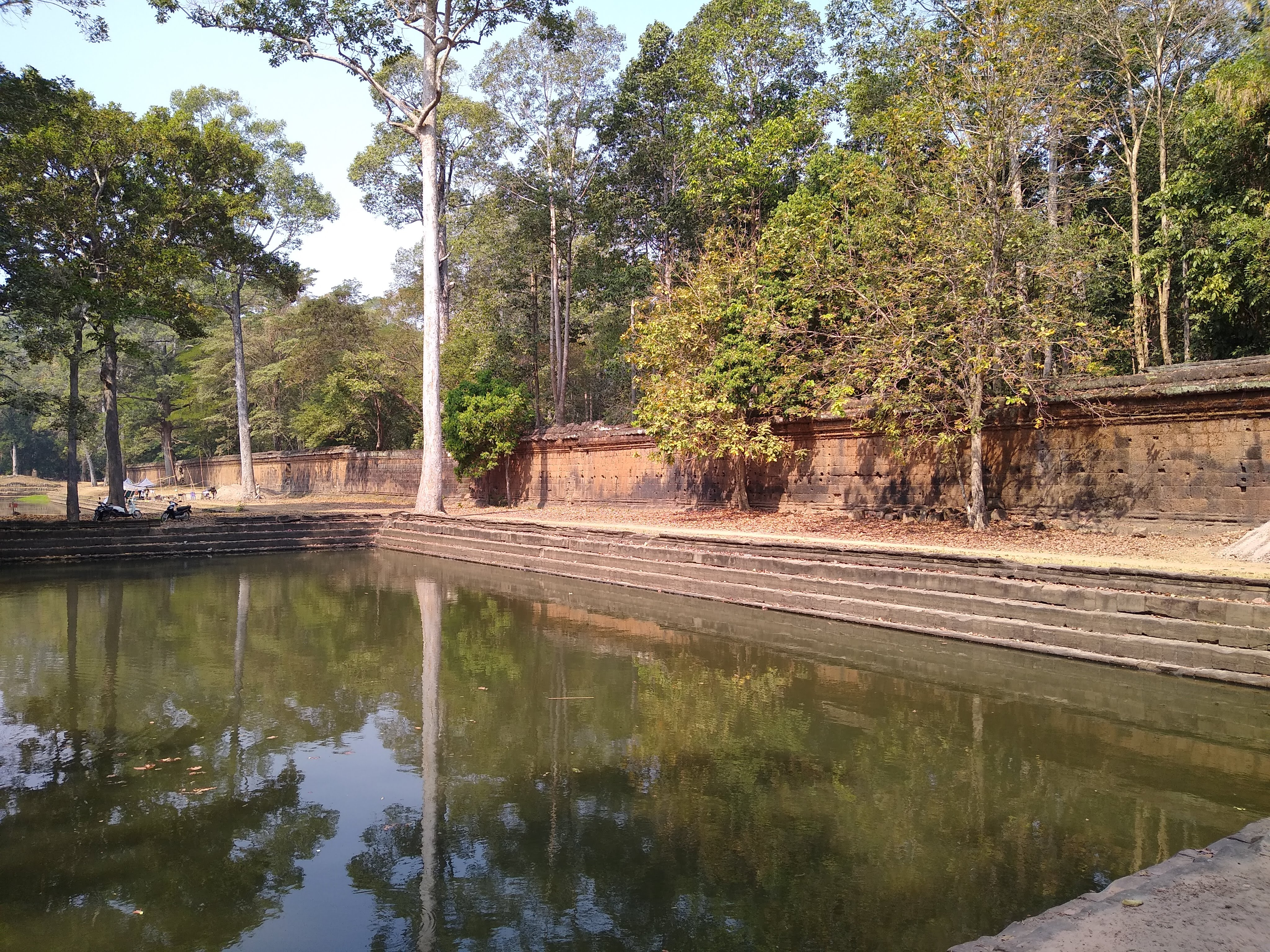
The East Pond

An 800 square meters sandstone pond, situated near the east gopura, was probably part of the first palace.

== Terrace and the West Pond ==
A small pond and low terrace are located to the west of the Large Pond that both connected by a laterite wall to the west northern gopura of the royal palace. The walls are carved with fascinating bas-reliefs of a procession of people, elephants and horses above a frieze of hamsas.

== Terrace to the east ==
The cruciform terrace with round column and overhanging top was typically built in the 16th century AD.

== Four small sanctuaries to the east ==
The four small sanctuaries were constructed in the early phase, which evidenced by their floor level. They are opening to the west and parallel to the southeast of the second part of the Royal Palace.

== See also ==
- Angkor Thom Foundry
