= Little Rock Pond =

Little Rock Pond may refer to:

- Little Rock Pond (Big Moose, New York)
- Little Rock Pond (Beaver River, New York)

== See also ==
- Little Rocky Pond (Massachusetts)
