= Lost Pond (Big Moose, New York) =

Lake in New York, United States

- Location of Lost Pond within New York
- Location: Herkimer County, New York
- Coordinates: 43°50′05″N 74°58′35″W
- Type: Lake
- Basin countries: United States
- Surface area: 5 acres (2.0 ha)
- Surface elevation: 1,841 ft (561 m)
- Settlements: Big Moose

Lost Pond is a small lake west-northwest of Big Moose in Herkimer County, New York. It drains south via an unnamed creek that flows into Twitchell Creek.

== See also ==
- List of lakes in New York
