= Little Rock Pond (Big Moose, New York) =

- Location of Little Rock Pond within New York
- Location: Herkimer County, New York
- Coordinates: 43°50′02″N 74°56′34″W
- Type: Lake
- Basin countries: United States
- Surface area: 8 acres (3.2 ha)
- Surface elevation: 1,919 ft (585 m)
- Settlements: Big Moose

Little Rock Pond is a small lake northwest of Big Moose in Herkimer County, New York. It drains south via an unnamed creek that flows into Twitchell Creek.

== See also ==
- List of lakes in New York
