= South Branch (New York) =

Location
- Country: United States
- State: New York

Physical characteristics
- Source: East Pond
  - location: NE of Big Moose
  - coordinates: 43°51′56″N 74°52′02″W
- Mouth: Stillwater Reservoir
  - location: Big Moose
  - coordinates: 43°54′37″N 74°52′53″W
  - elevation: 1,699 ft (518 m)

South Branch flows out of East Pond, northeast of Big Moose, New York. Consequently, it flows into Stillwater Reservoir, southwest of Little Rapids, New York.
