= Lost Pond =

Lost Pond may refer to:

- Lost Pond (Big Moose, New York)
- Lost Pond, a former name of Big Deer Pond, Hamilton County, New York
- Lost Pond (Oswegatchie SW, New York)
