= Angkor Thom Foundry =

Bronze workshop in Angkor royal compound

Site information
- Location: Siem Reap, Cambodia
- Type: Archaeological site

History
- Part of: Angkor Thom
- Use: 11th-13th Centuries AD
- Phase: Bronze Age
- Discovered: 1926
- Discovered by: Henri Marchal

The Angkor Thom Foundry references a metallurgy workshop associated with The Royal Palace of Angkor Thom, the capital city of Angkor during the time of the Foundry's use. This workshop is believed to have specialised in bronze production.

== Location and use ==
The foundry is located west of the Terrace of the Leper King, just north of the palace. The stratigraphic sequence of metals and slag remains uncovered suggest that the site was in use between the 11th and 13th century. The foundry is large, having been measured at just over 2 hectares. Bronze cast statues of deities were produced at this location for throughout the dynasty, for use in buildings, on jewellery and accessories, and furnishings.

The reduction in use of this site occurs around the same time as major religious changes in Angkor, as it was towards the end of the 12th century that King Jayaraman VII made Buddhism the religion of Angkor, replacing Hinduism. Bronze statues reflecting Buddhist concepts and Hindu gods are found across Angkor and Pre-Angkor sites.

Bronze artefacts are able to be associated with cities by examining factors that are regionally different, such as composition of the alloy, method of production, and distinct decorative choices, such as patterns of gilding.

Angkor Thom, as the capital of Angkor, was a significant participant of southeast Asian trade economy. While there is evidence for the production of bronze at the site, there is more limited evidence for iron smelting, leading archaeologists to believe that part of the bronze trade relied on trade from nearby cities that relied on iron more heavily. Copper was received in ingots and cast using the lost-wax casting technique, producing bronze casting on an industrial scale.

This foundry would have been capable of producing large amounts and large size bronze castings, with the furnace found able to hold eighteen kilograms of bronze. Analysis of the sprue size indicates that the foundry was capable of creating castings that weighed hundreds of kilograms. It is further believed that there may have been multiple furnaces at this site.

== Discovery and excavation ==
The evidence for a foundry was first discovered by French archaeologist Henri Marchal in 1926. He initially identified two sculptures representing divinity, one of which has now been identified as Visnu, and went on to discover other bronze artefacts during his work there.

In the late nineteenth century, Jean Moura noted that the name of two of the towers near this area, prāsāda jāṅ daa, translated to 'jeweller's towers'. Bronze objects continued to be unearthed during the 1950s in a series of excavations run by Bernard Phillippe Goslie, before another excavation in 2009 which unearthed more sculptures. More recently the site was excavated in 2012 and 2013, excavating 150m³ of soil and recovering over 2000 artefacts that support the metallurgy hypothesis. This included a number of fragments of bronze sculpture, foundry waste and slags, hammering waste, tools such as chisels, ceramic shards and a basin furnace.

In Angkor Thom more generally, bronze artefacts have been recovered throughout the city, such as statues that represent Hindu and Buddhist deities, ceremonial items, including utensils and bells, unsuccessful casting, and casting materials including moulds and copper ingots.

== Significance ==
The foundry being placed so close to the palace indicates that Angkorian kings may have placed value on the bronze items. This is supported by the presence of rare and imported products such as mercury in bronze products.

It was a duty of the Palace to provide art depicting the gods for temple. Statue making is a significant aspect of both Hindu and Buddhist religion, with a noted historical and continued significance in cultural aspects of Hindu spaces. Deity statues represented the role of Jayavarman VII as a connection between earth and heaven. The importance of bronze is further indicated by its continued presence in burials throughout pre-Angkorian and Angkorian sites.

In Angkor Thom, under Jayavarman VII, a number of religious buildings were constructed, which would require decoration with statues of deities and ceremonial items. Bronze metallurgy in Angkor generally was driven by royalty – their preferences, deities they worshipped and command of construction, as is described in contemporary descriptions. Some of the inscriptions found describe how Queen Jayarajadevi, spouse of Jayavarman VII, would donate bronze statues to make merit, the accumulation of good karma following a good deed.

Archaeologically, it is significant as it is the first and only royal foundry in Southeast Asia, and the first prehistoric bronze workshop.

== Bronze in Pre-Angkor and Angkor ==
Bronze statues and art are commonly associated with Angkorian history, generally used in statues depicting gods of the Hindu religion and Buddhist religious concepts, sacred items or items for ritual, and as a display of wealth. Such statues are found all through pre-Angkorian and Angkorian sites. Further to bronze artefacts, it is believed that many gold statues may have been gilded bronze, and it was a feature of some structural elements in buildings, such as floors.

While the quality of bronze items discovered varies from expensive artefacts to mass produced pieces, categorised but aesthetic quality, radiographic imaging reveals that the quality of production was consistently high, and further that the production process was well-developed.

There are several features of the bronze statues that are distinctive during this period, for example Angkorian and pre-Angkorian bronze consistently contains tin, and imperfections in the chemical make-up indicate that there was a consistent and single source used for most copper. Copper was not a local resource in the Cambodian area, and therefore had to be gained from trade, so this finding indicates that it must have come from a consistent trading relationship, although from who was not determined. This could possibly be from Vietnamese pre-Angkorian sites, where there is evidence of copper mining as early as the 2nd millennium BC. Despite the significance of bronze in Cambodian history and somewhat consistent composition of the bronze, there is no evidence of a recipe.

The first evidence of bronze artefacts is seen in pre-Angkorian burials and sites in Thailand during the 11th and 10th centuries BC, at Ban Non Wat, Ban Chiang, Ban Lum Khao and Non Nok Tha. It has been proposed that bronze metallurgy arrived in southeast Asia from China and persisted through the bronze and iron age.
