= Twitchell Mountain =

Mountain in New York, United States

- Location within New York Location within the United States

Highest point
- Elevation: 2,352 feet (717 m)
- Coordinates: 43°51′41″N 74°54′00″W

Geography
- Location: NNE of Big Moose, New York, U.S.
- Topo map: USGS Big Moose

Twitchell Mountain is a summit in the Central New York Region of New York located in the Town of Webb in Herkimer County, north-northeast of Big Moose. Twitchell Lake is located southeast of Twitchell Mountain. Mount Tom is located east of Twitchell Mountain.
