= Twitchett =

Twitchett is a surname. Notable people with the surname include:

- Cyril Twitchett (1890–1950), Anglican archdeacon and chaplain
- Denis Twitchett (1925–2006), British Sinologist and historian

== See also ==
- Twitchell
