= Sugarloaf (New York) =

Mountain in New York, United States

- Location within New York Adirondack Park Location within the United States

Highest point
- Elevation: 2,201 feet (671 m)
- Coordinates: 43°49′58″N 74°49′20″W

Geography
- Location: SE of Little Rapids, New York, USA
- Topo map: USGS Eagle Bay

Sugarloaf is a summit in Herkimer County, New York and partly in Hamilton County, New York in the Adirondack Mountains. It is located southeast of Little Rapids in the Town of Webb. Mount Tom is located north-northwest of Sugarloaf.
