= Twitchell Lake =

Twitchell Lake may refer to:

- Twitchell Lake (New York), a lake in New York
- Twitchell Reservoir, a reservoir in California
