= East Pond (Eagle Bay, New York) =

Lake in Herkimer County, New York, United States

- Location of East Pond within New York
- Location: Herkimer County, New York
- Coordinates: 43°51′50″N 74°51′47″W
- Type: Lake
- Primary outflows: South Branch
- Basin countries: United States
- Surface area: 26 acres (0.041 mi^{2}; 11 ha)
- Surface elevation: 2,152 feet (656 m)
- Settlements: Big Moose

East Pond is a small lake northeast of Big Moose in Herkimer County, New York. It drains northwest via South Branch which flows into Stillwater Reservoir.

== See also ==
- List of lakes in New York
