= Twitchell Lake (New York) =

- Location within New York Twitchell Lake (the United States)
- Location: Herkimer County, New York, United States
- Coordinates: 43°51′00″N 74°53′07″W
- Type: Lake
- Primary outflows: Twitchell Creek
- Basin countries: United States
- Surface area: 142 acres (0.57 km^{2})
- Average depth: 10 feet (3.0 m)
- Max. depth: 34 feet (10 m)
- Shore length^{1}: 4 miles (6.4 km)
- Surface elevation: 2,051 feet (625 m)
- Islands: 1
- Settlements: Big Moose, New York
- ^{1} Shore length is not a well-defined measure.

Twitchell Lake is a lake located northeast of Big Moose, New York. The outlet is Twitchell Creek which flows into Stillwater Reservoir. Fish species present in the lake are brook trout, yellow perch, and black bullhead. There is a state owned beach launch located on Twitchell Road. There is not a horsepower motor limit on Twitchell Lake. Twitchell Mountain is located northwest of Twitchell Lake.

A webpage for the lake is located at http://www.twitchelllake.com
