= Mount Tom (Herkimer County, New York) =

Mountain in New York, United States

- Location within New York Adirondack Park Location within the United States

Highest point
- Elevation: 2,444 feet (745 m)
- Coordinates: 43°51′18″N 74°50′07″W

Geography
- Location: SE of Little Rapids, New York, USA
- Topo map: USGS Eagle Bay

Mount Tom is a summit in Herkimer County, New York in the Adirondack Mountains. It is located southeast of Little Rapids in the Town of Webb. Twitchell Mountain is located west and Sugarloaf is located south-southeast of Mount Tom.
