= East Pond (Old Forge, New York) =

Lake in Herkimer County, New York, United States

- Location of East Pond within New York
- Location: Herkimer County, New York
- Coordinates: 43°41′40″N 74°53′46″W
- Basin countries: United States
- Surface area: 36 acres (0.056 mi^{2}; 15 ha)
- Surface elevation: 1,818 feet (554 m)
- Settlements: Old Forge

East Pond is a small lake east-southeast of Old Forge in Herkimer County, New York, United States. It drains south via an unnamed creek that flows into Limekiln Creek.

== See also ==
- List of lakes in New York
