= Phnom Krom railway =

Former narrow gauge railway in Cambodia

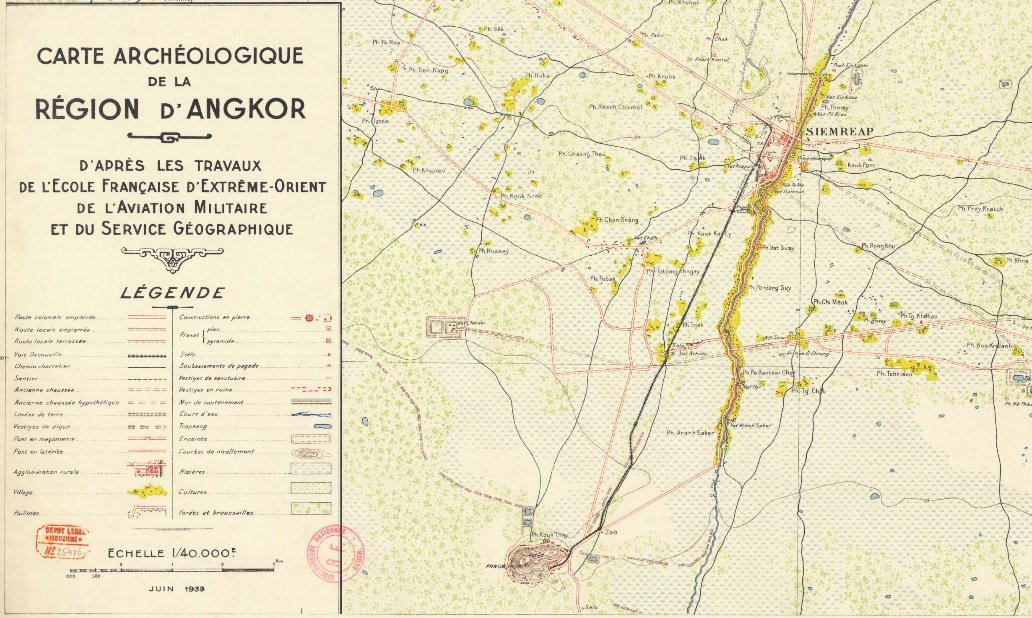
Route of the Decauville railway on an archeological map of 1939

The Phnom Krom railway was a 600 mm (1 ft 11 5/8 in) gauge narrow gauge railway that ran approximately 6 miles (9.5 km) from the town of Siem Reap, Cambodia in the north to the temple hill of Phnom Krom in the south. Very little historical evidence remains about this railway, its original purpose, date of construction or date of closure.

== Historical evidence ==
The primary source of historical evidence for the existence of the Phnom Krom railway is its appearance on a number of maps. For example, a 1962 US Army Corps of Engineers map of the area shows the railway clearly marked, and its demarcation is as a ‘narrow gauge’ railway, as opposed to standard gauge (which, in keeping with the standard gauge of Cambodia and much of South East Asia, is listed as 1 metre). The railway also shows up in the same position on a number of other maps of Siem Reap from the 1960s.

== Description of route ==
The railway ran 6 miles (9.5 km) in a south-westerly direction from what was then the western side of Siem Reap town, in a straight line to Phnom Krom. According to the available maps, the northern terminus of the railway was just north of National Highway 6, in what was then a military area.

== Conjecture on origin, use and removal ==
Though no evidence is known to exist on the origins and use of the Phnom Krom railway, it is possible to hazard some guesses based on the pattern of French colonial railway construction in the rest of South East Asia, and remaining physical evidence on the ground.

=== Origin and use ===
It is most probable that the railway originated as a quarrying railway, transporting stone from extensive quarries on the north eastern and south eastern faces of Phnom Krom (which are still evident, though now defunct) to provide material for the construction of the French colonial administrative centre at Siem Reap. It is impossible to speculate when the railway was constructed, but most likely it would have between around 1890 (when the French were, among other things, undertaking extensive construction in Phnom Penh which also included the use of narrow gauge railways) and perhaps as late as the 1920s, when work on the Grand Hotel D'Angkor was being undertaken (a project which would have required large quantities of building materials).

=== Removal ===
Some maps from the 1960s with the railway marked mark it as disused, as it would almost certainly have been by that time. Again, it is possible the tracks were lifted a lot earlier, and the maps of this time are merely marking a railway that had long since disappeared on the ground, by compiling and copying information from earlier maps. If the track did survive in situ into the 1960s, it would have certainly been removed during the 1970s and the conflict that swept over Cambodia during that decade.

== Surviving evidence ==
=== Trackbed ===
The trackbed survives largely intact. Starting at Phnom Krom, most likely the southern terminus of the railway was in a cluster of buildings that are now used by the RCAF, under an old quarry face on the southern side of the hill. It then runs on the road leading to the Tonlé Sap for a short distance, before turning off to the north and taking a more direct route into Siem Reap. The majority of the length of the trackbed is a raised, red earth embankment, though no original bridges seem to have survived. It enters Siem Reap from the south, where the trackbed becomes a nameless street leading in a straight line leading due northwest, and passes in front (i.e. to the east) of what is now the Angkor Night Market. At the extreme northern end, it seems that the trackbed has been converted through a recent construction project into an open culvert for rainwater run-off, this runs as far as National Highway 6. Where the railway might once have terminated just north of the highway, the modern Hotel Sokha now stands.

=== Rails ===
On Phnom Krom itself is a winding road leading up to a Buddhist monastery, and an Angkorian temple. Lining this road are a series of old lampposts, no longer functional, with cast concrete bases and rails providing the pole. These rails, still extant in 2011, are consistent with 600 mm (1 ft 11 5/8 in) gauge narrow gauge rails, and are at any rate far ‘lighter’ than that used for the Cambodian standard gauge of 1 metre. It is impossible to conjecture whether the rail-lampposts were placed there by the railway itself (perhaps an attempt to develop Phnom Krom as a tourist location), or by another party after the railway had ceased to function.

== See also ==
- Rail transport in Cambodia
