= East Pond (Thendara, New York) =

Lake in Herkimer County, New York, United States

- Location of East Pond within New York
- Location: Herkimer County, New York
- Coordinates: 43°44′26″N 75°02′55″W
- Basin countries: United States
- Surface area: 59 acres (0.092 mi^{2}; 24 ha)
- Surface elevation: 1,824 feet (556 m)
- Islands: 3
- Settlements: Minnehaha

East Pond is a small lake north-northeast of Minnehaha in Herkimer County, New York. It drains west via an unnamed creek that flows into Lost Creek.

== See also ==
- List of lakes in New York
