= Phnom Dei Commune =

Phnom Dei ឃុំភ្នំដី
- Commune
- Location within Cambodia
- Coordinates: 13°45′57″N 103°22′59″E
- Country: Cambodia
- Province: Banteay Meanchey
- District: Phnom Srok District
- Villages: 9
- Time zone: UTC+07
- Geocode: 010306

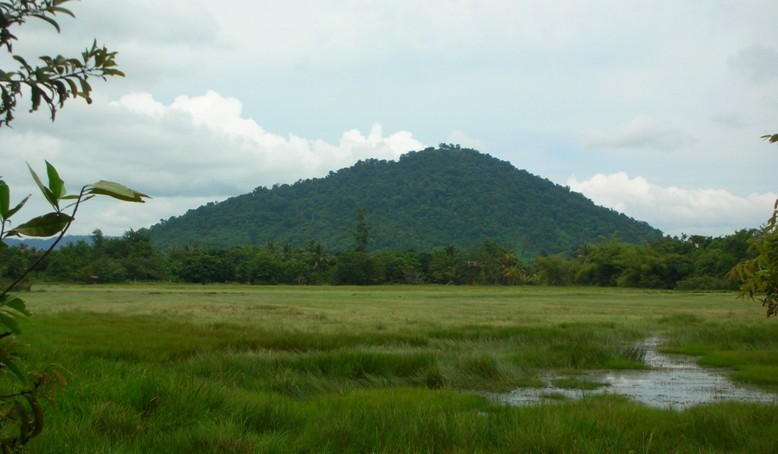
Phnom Dei

Phnom Dei is a khum (commune) of Phnom Srok District in Banteay Meanchey Province in western Cambodia.

== Villages ==
- Phnom Dei
- Ponley
- Kouk Seh
- Thnal Dach
- Bos Sbov
- Trapeang Prei
- Kamping Puoy
- Spean Kmeng
- Trang
