= Twitchell Creek =

Location
- Country: United States
- State: New York

Physical characteristics
- Source: Twitchell Lake
  - location: Big Moose, New York
  - coordinates: 43°50′28″N 74°53′38″W
- Mouth: Stillwater Reservoir
  - location: Woods Lake, New York
  - coordinates: 42°48′45″N 74°59′58″W
  - elevation: 1,716 ft (523 m)

Basin features
- Tributaries
  - left: Birch Creek

Twitchell Creek flows out of Twitchell Lake northwest of Big Moose, New York and flows into Stillwater Reservoir west of Woods Lake, New York.
