= Phnom Krom =

Mountain in Cambodia

- ភ្នំក្រោម
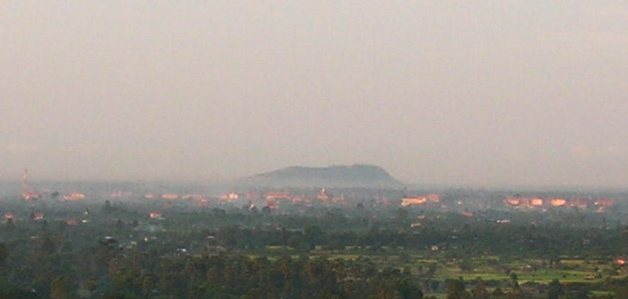
- View of Phnom Krom at dawn

Highest point
- Elevation: 140 m (460 ft)
- Coordinates: 13°17′09″N 103°48′44″E

Geography
- Location within Cambodia
- Location: Siem Reap Province, Cambodia

Geology
- Mountain type: Sandstone

Climbing
- Easiest route: Drive, then hike

Phnom Krom (Khmer: ភ្នំក្រោម, lit. "downstream hill") is a 140 m high hill close to Siem Reap city, Cambodia. There is a temple on the top which derived its name from the hill, Prasat Phnom Krom (Khmer: ប្រាសាទភ្នំក្រោម).

== Location ==
Phnom Krom is about 12 kilometers southwest of Siem Reap town.

Phnom Krom hill is very rocky; local legend has it that the rocks were exposed by the monkey general Hanuman during a hunt for medicine in the Ramayana epic. The area beyond the temple’s west gate affords views of the Tonle Sap lake.

== Phnom Krom railway ==
Phnom Krom was at the southern end of the Phnom Krom railway, a narrow-gauge French colonial railway that was most likely constructed to take stone from the now-defunct quarries on Phnom Krom to Siem Reap.

== Gallery ==
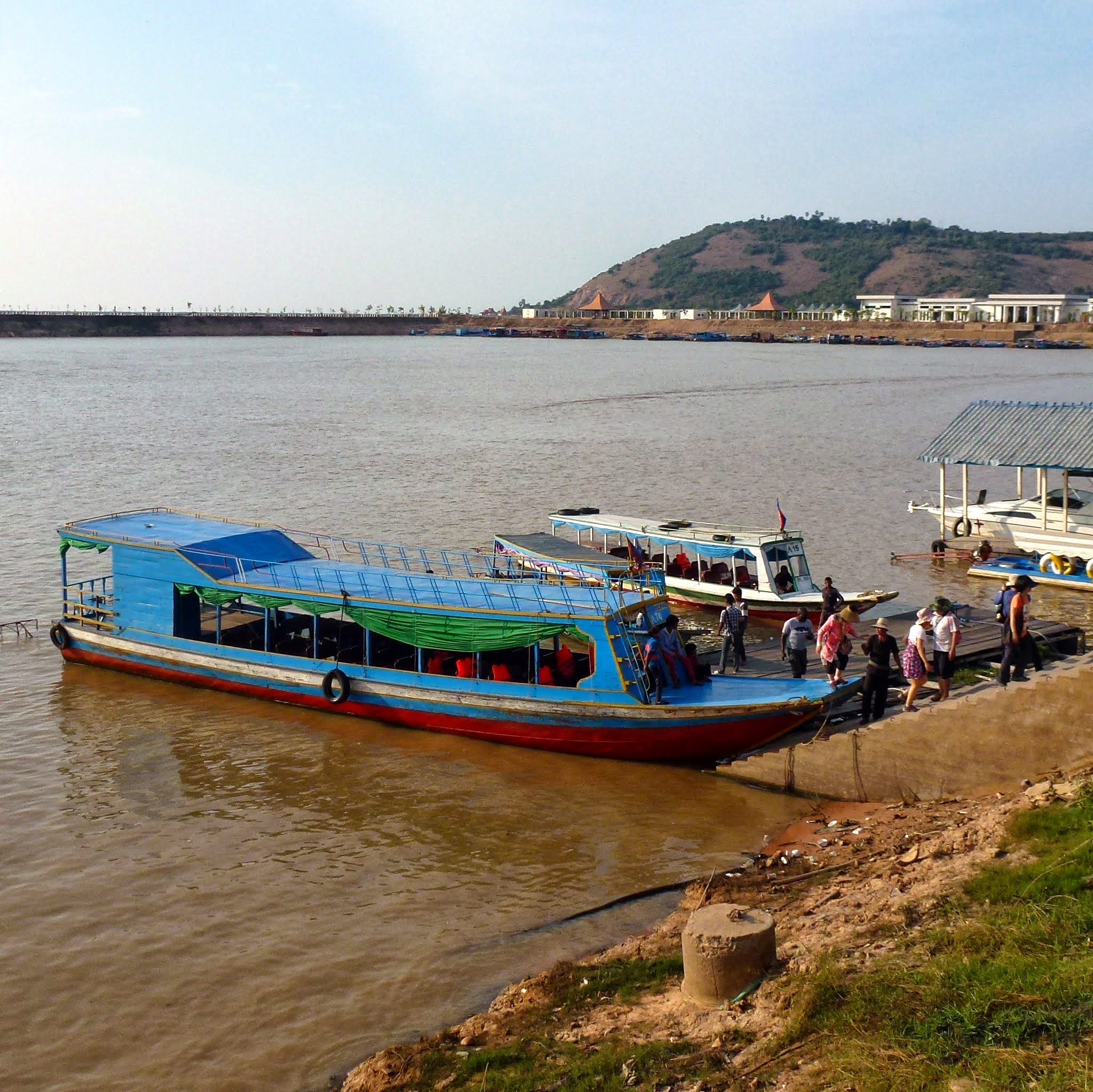
Tonle Sap lake and Phnom Krom hill

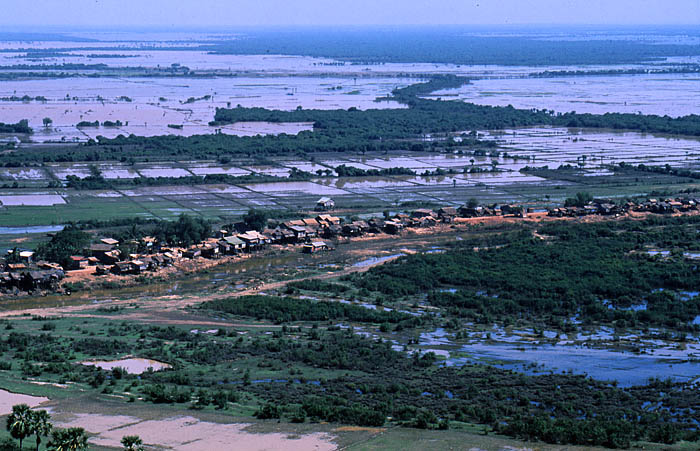
Tonle Sap lake and Chong Kneas village viewed from Phnom Krom hill

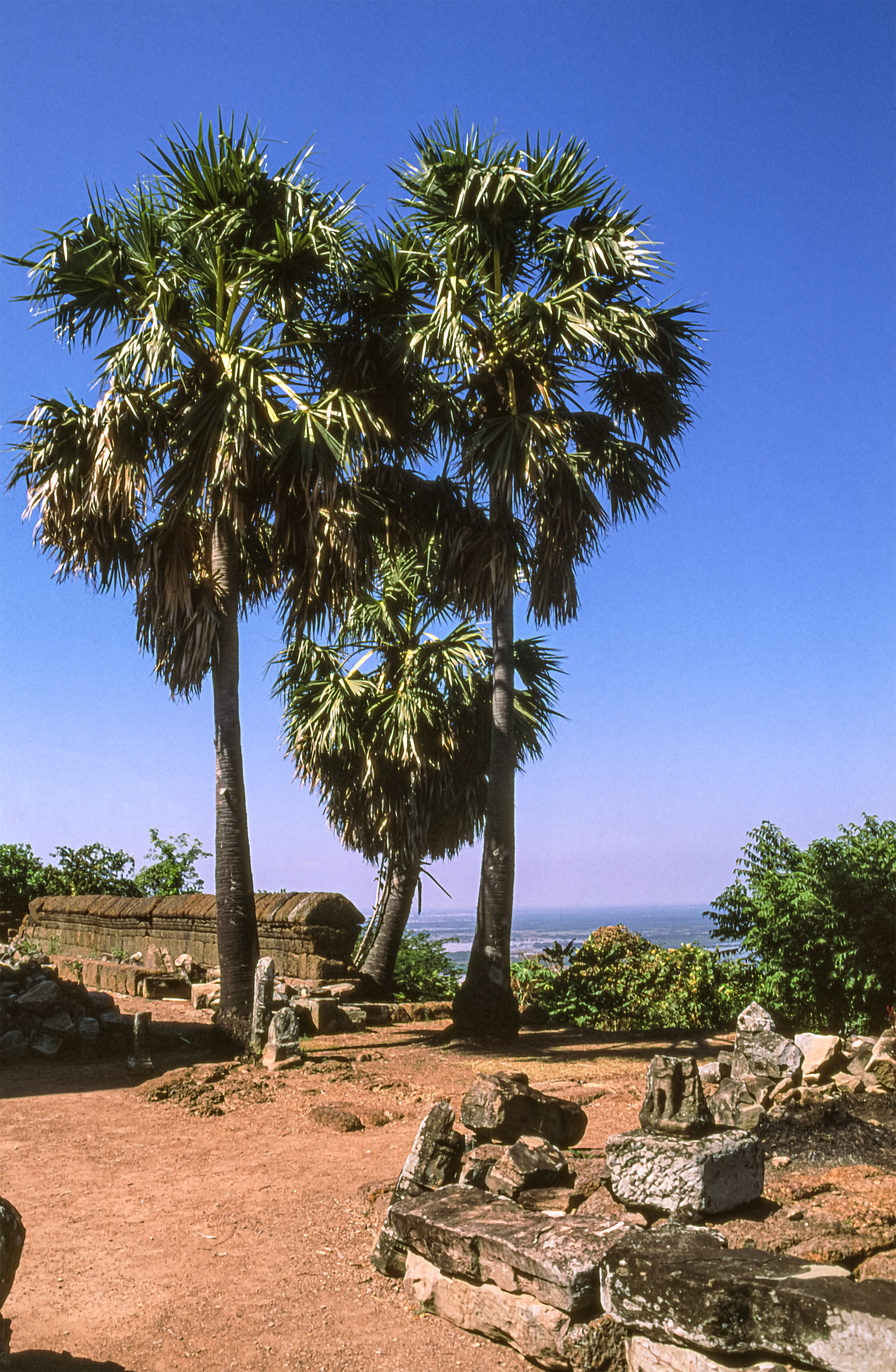
Sugar palm trees on the hill

== See also ==
- Phnom Bakheng
- Phnom Bok
