= Terrace of the Leper King =

Archaeological site in Cambodia

Coordinates: 13°26′54″N 103°51′31″E

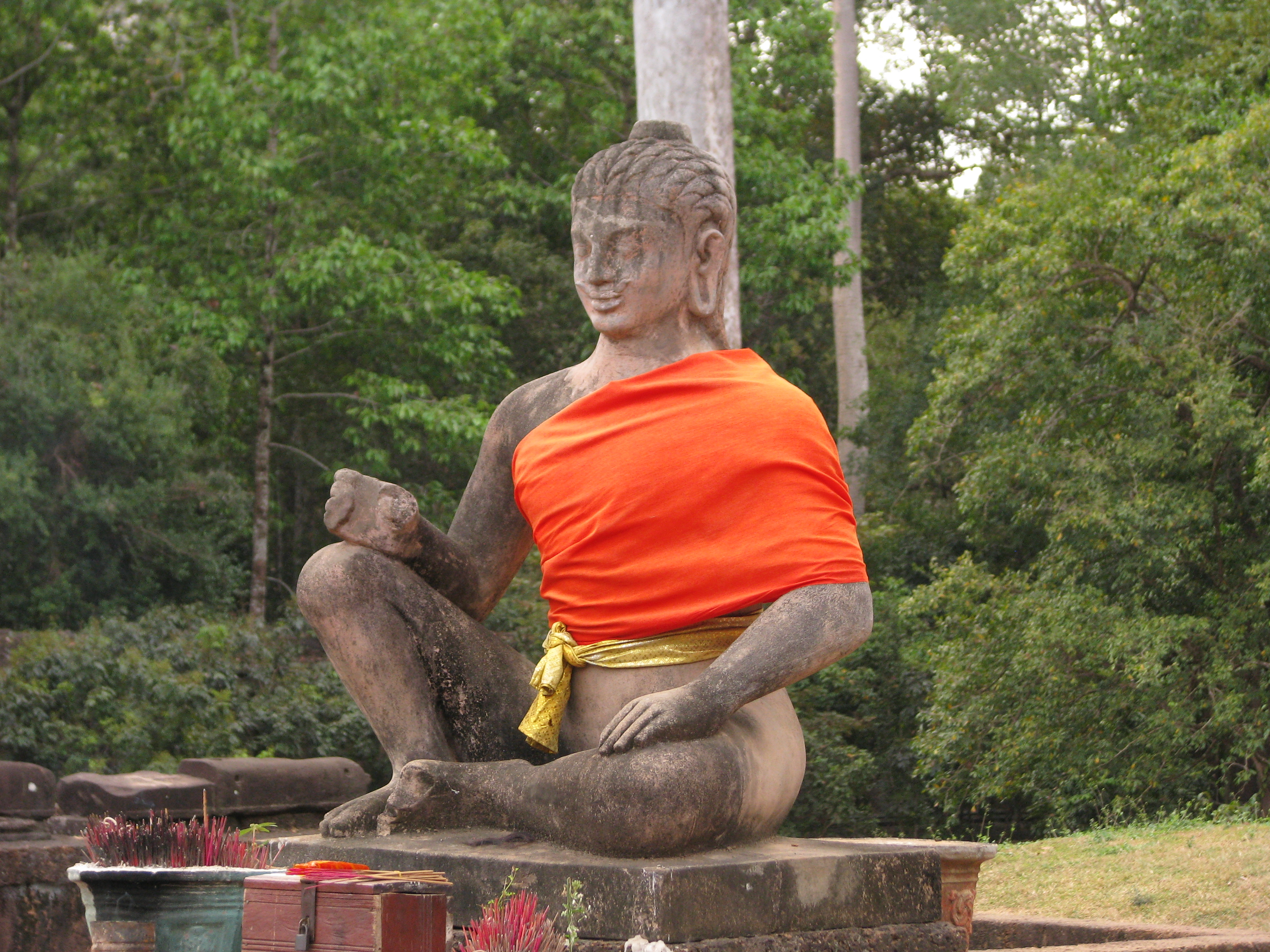
Leper King's altar

The Terrace of the Leper King (or Leper King Terrace; Khmer: ព្រះលានស្តេចគម្លង់ Preah Lean Sdach Kumlung) is a statue located in the northwest corner of the Royal Square of Angkor Thom, Cambodia.

It was built in the Bayon style under Jayavarman VII, though its modern name is from an 8th-century sculpture discovered at the site. A datable inscription of the 14th-15th century identifies it with Dharmaraja, the "Dharma King", which is an epithet of Yama, the Indic god of death and ruler of the underworld.

The statue was called the "Leper King" because discolouration and moss growing on it looked similar to the symptoms of leprosy, connecting it to the Cambodian legend of Angkorian king Yasovarman I having the disease. The name Cambodians know the image as is Dharmaraja, as this is what was etched at the bottom of the original statue.

The U-shaped structure is thought by some to have been used as a royal cremation site.

== Legacy ==
Yukio Mishima's final play before his death in 1970 was Raiō no Terasu (癩王のテラス; The Terrace of the Leper King). The play revolves around King Jayavarman VII returning triumphant from his battle against the Chams and commissions the Temple of Bayon. After announcing the project, the king's sees his perfect skin show the first signs of leprosy. His leprosy spreads apace with the construction of the temple; he eventually goes blind and dies at its completion.

== Gallery ==
Terrace of the Leper King

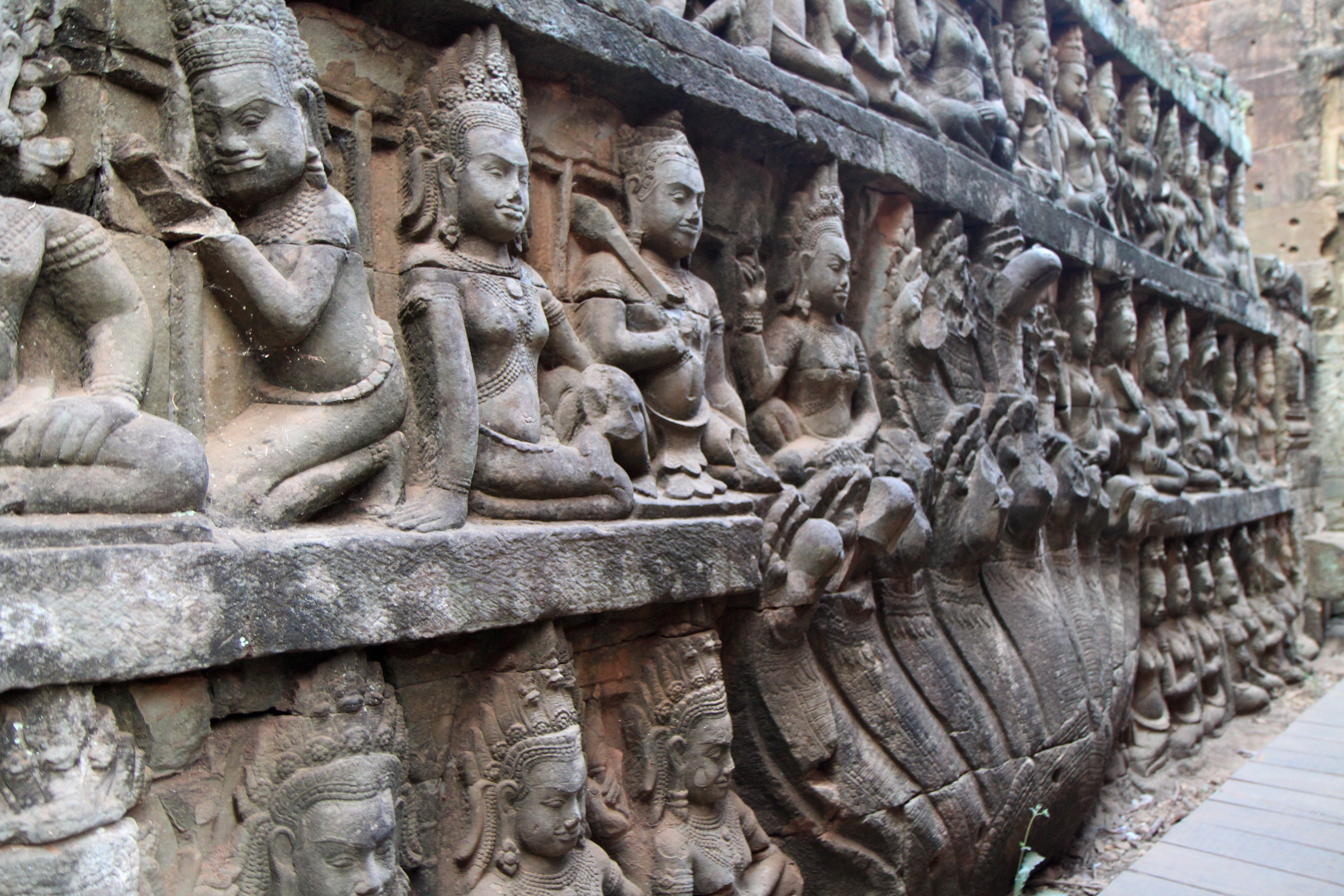
Terrace of the Leper King

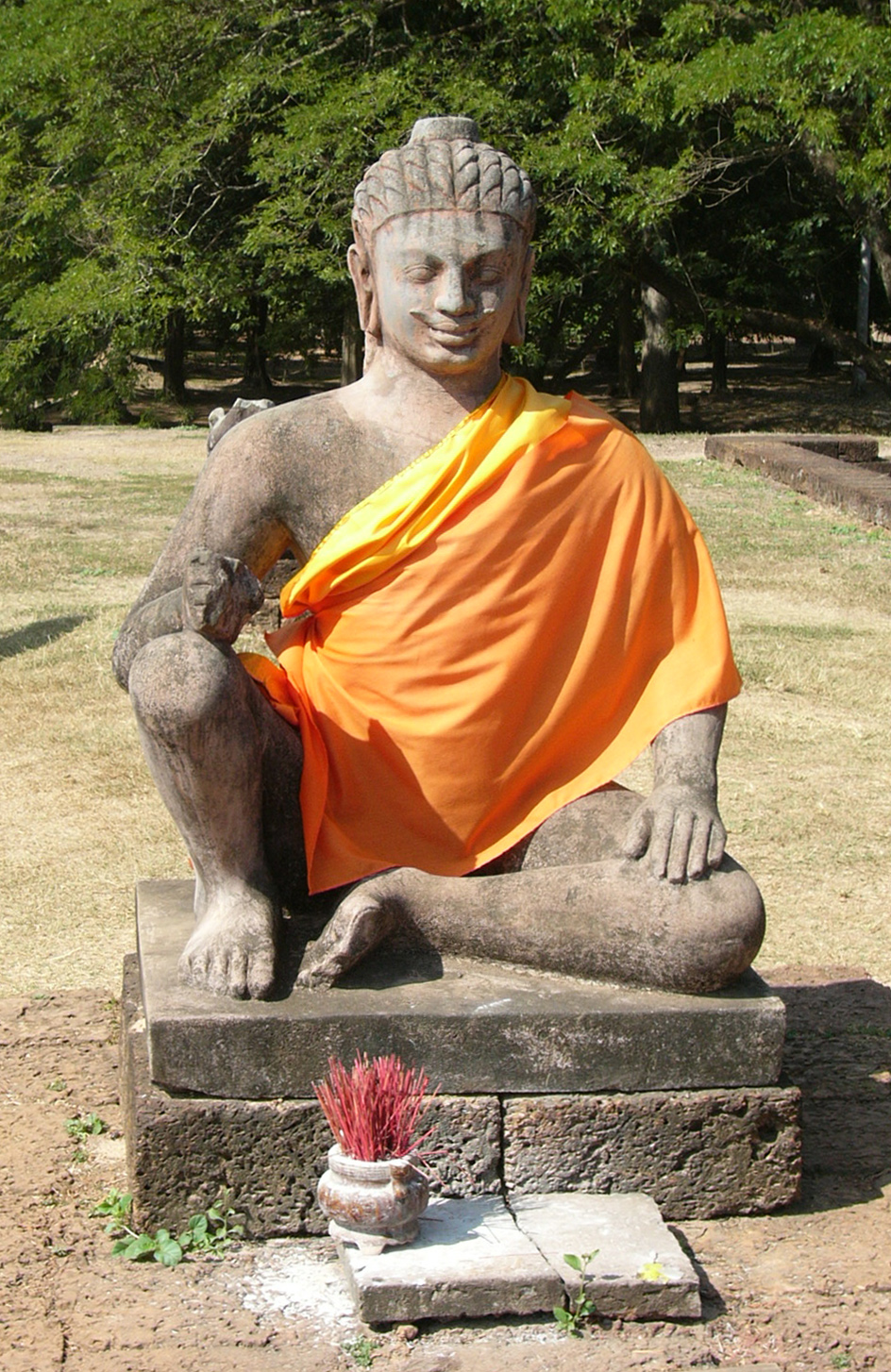
The statue which gave the terrace its name has been replaced by a replica.
