= Phnom Bok =

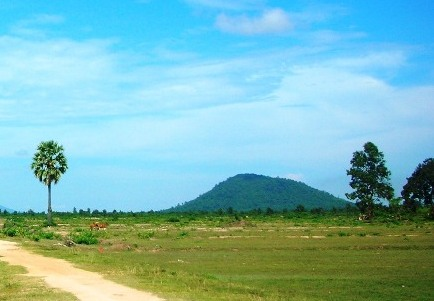
- Phnom Bok hill

Highest point
- Elevation: 205 m (673 ft)
- Coordinates: 13°27′57″N 103°58′59″E

Geography
- Location in Cambodia
- Location: Siem Reap, Cambodia

Climbing
- Easiest route: drive or hike

Phnom Bok Temple
- Prasat Phnom Bok
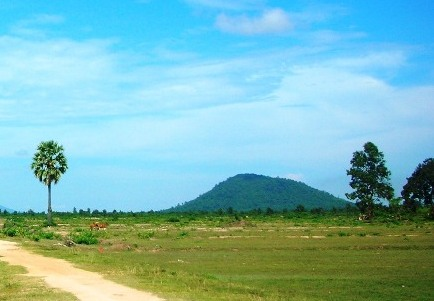

- Location in Cambodia

Religion
- Affiliation: Hinduism
- Province: Siem Reap
- Deity: Shiva, Vishnu and Brahma

Location
- Location: Angkor
- Country: Cambodia
- Coordinates: 13°27′58″N 103°58′55″E

Architecture
- Type: Bakheng style of Khmer architecture
- Creator: King Yasovarman I (889–910 AD)
- Completed: 9th–10th century

Specifications
- Temple: Three
- Elevation: 221 m (725 ft)

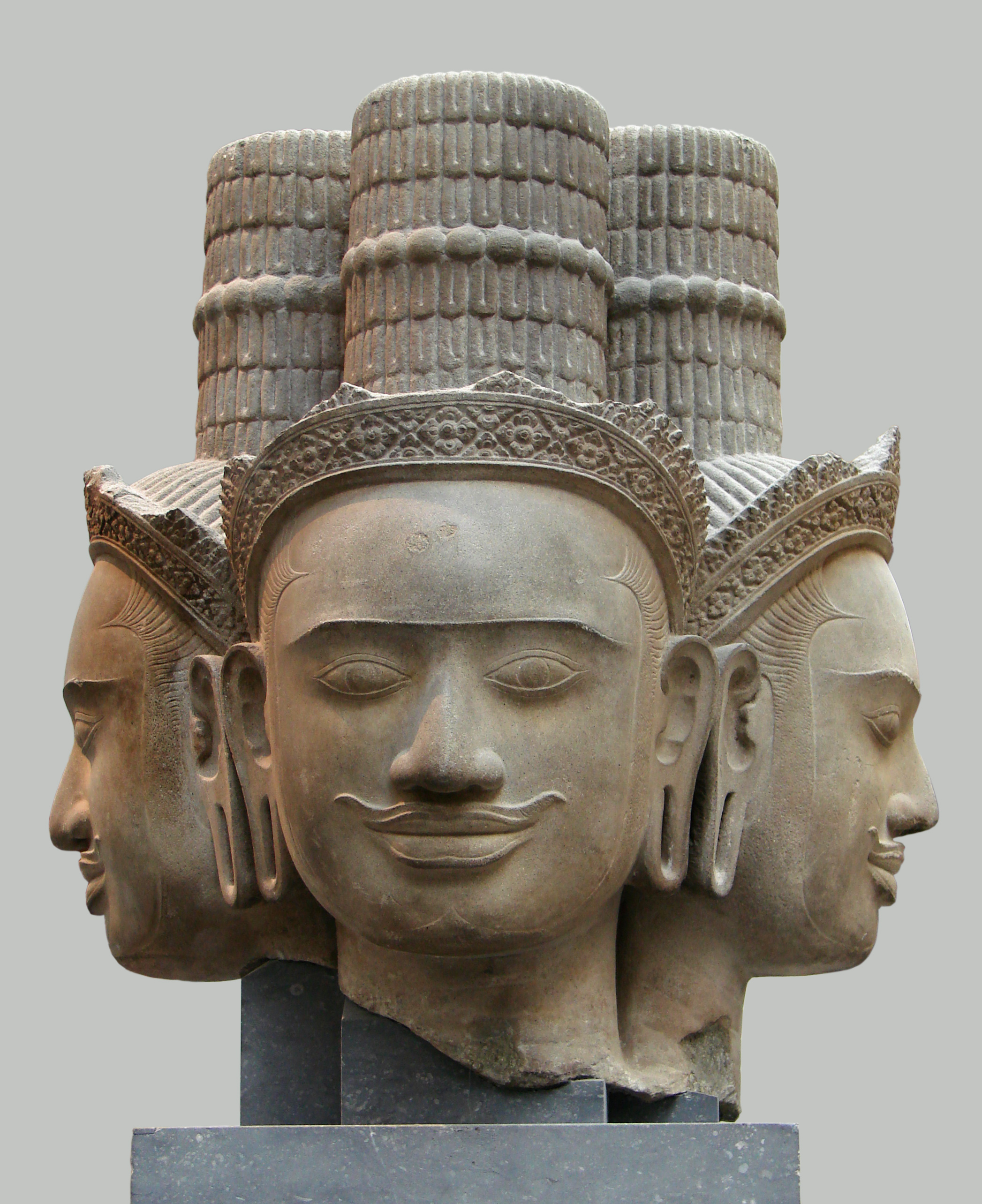
Head of Brahma in sandstone from the Phnom Bok in Bakheng style now in Guimet Museum in Paris.

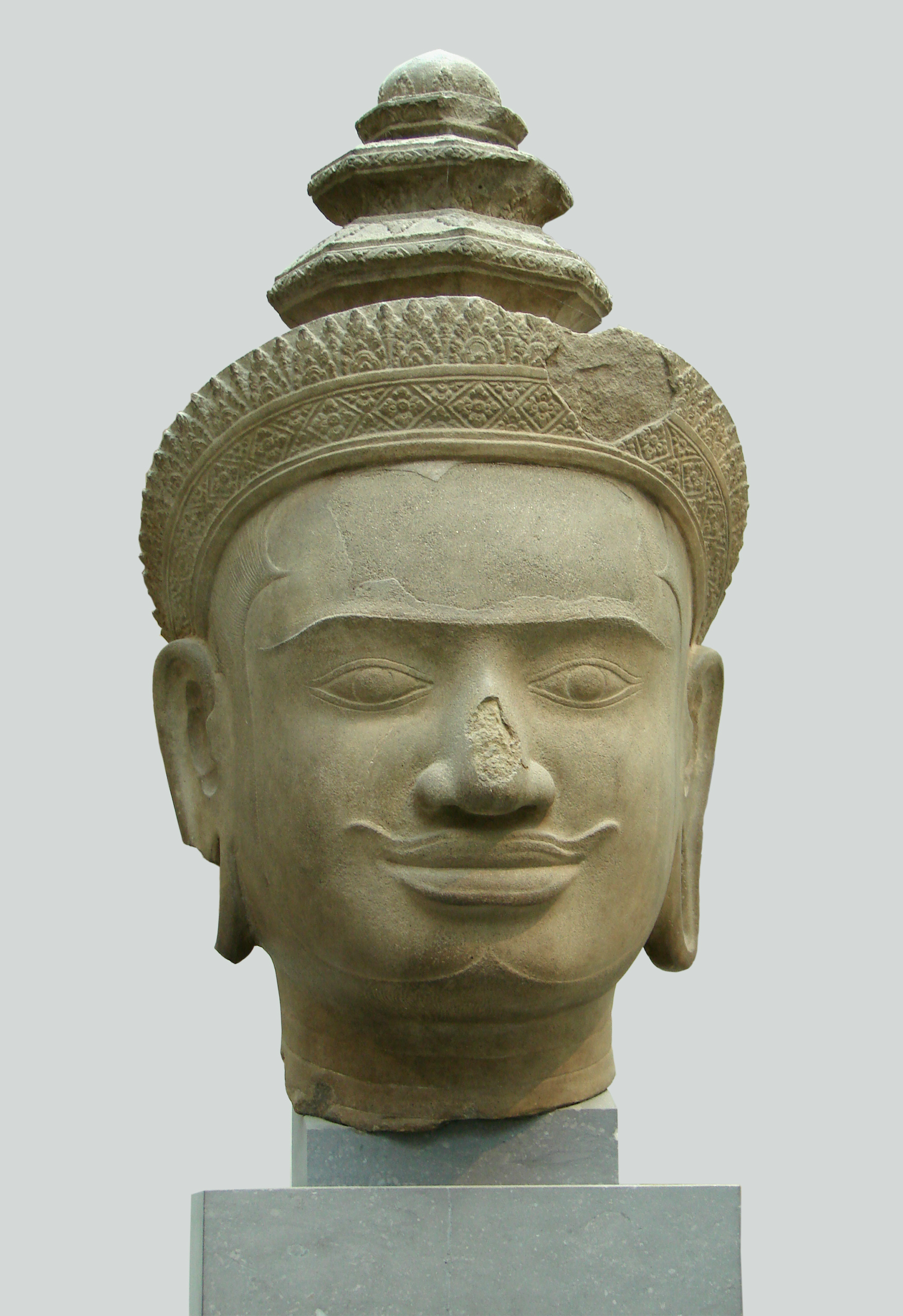
Head of Vishnu in sandstone from the Phnom Bok in Bakheng style now in Guimet Museum in Paris.

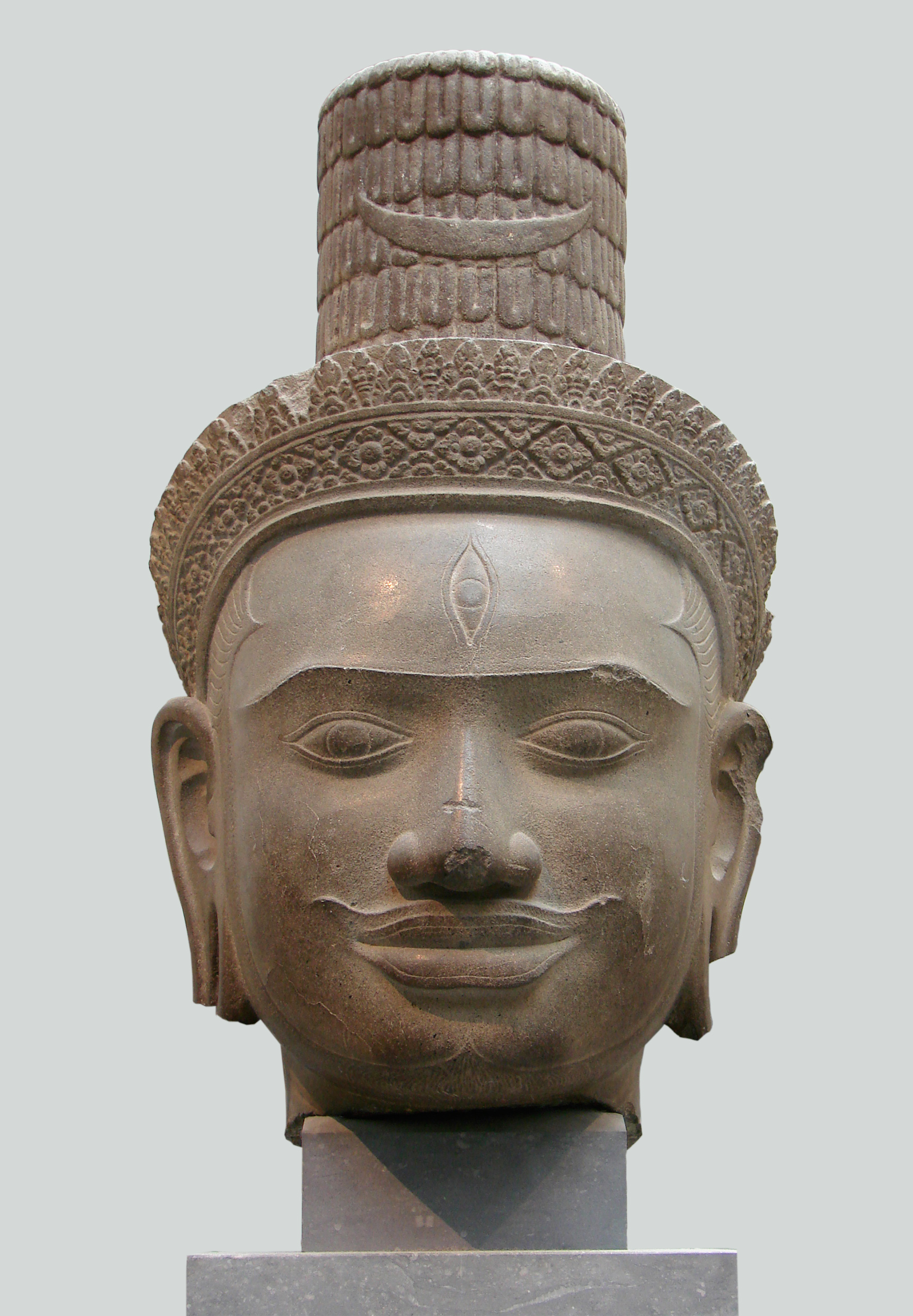
Head of Shiva in sandstone from the Phnom Bok in Bakheng style now in Guimet Museum in Paris of the trimurti or trimvarite of Hindu pantheon

Phnom Bok (Khmer: ភ្នំបូក) is a hill in the northeast of Eastern Baray in Cambodia, with a prasat (temple) (Khmer: ប្រាសាទភ្នំបូក) of the same name built on it. It is one of the "trilogies of mountains", each of which has a temple with similar layout. The creation of the temple is credited to the reign of Yasovarman I (889–910) between 9th and 10th centuries; established after he moved his capital to Angkor and named it Yasodharapura. The two other sister temples, named after the contiguous hills, are the Phnom Bakheng and Phnom Krom.

The site of the three hills was chosen by Yashovarman I along with the Eastern Baray (where only the base of the central shrine is surviving). In the 10th century, these shrines had high religious value during the Angkorian rule. The temples called as part of an "architectural triad" brought about an element of experimentation in architectural style in the Angkorian period. From the astronomical references planned for three temples, out of the four noted alignments three, namely, equinox and winter and Solar Solstices could be observed from inside the western entrance of Phnom Bok hill temple, which is also known for the triple sanctuary dedicated to the Trimurti.

== Geography ==
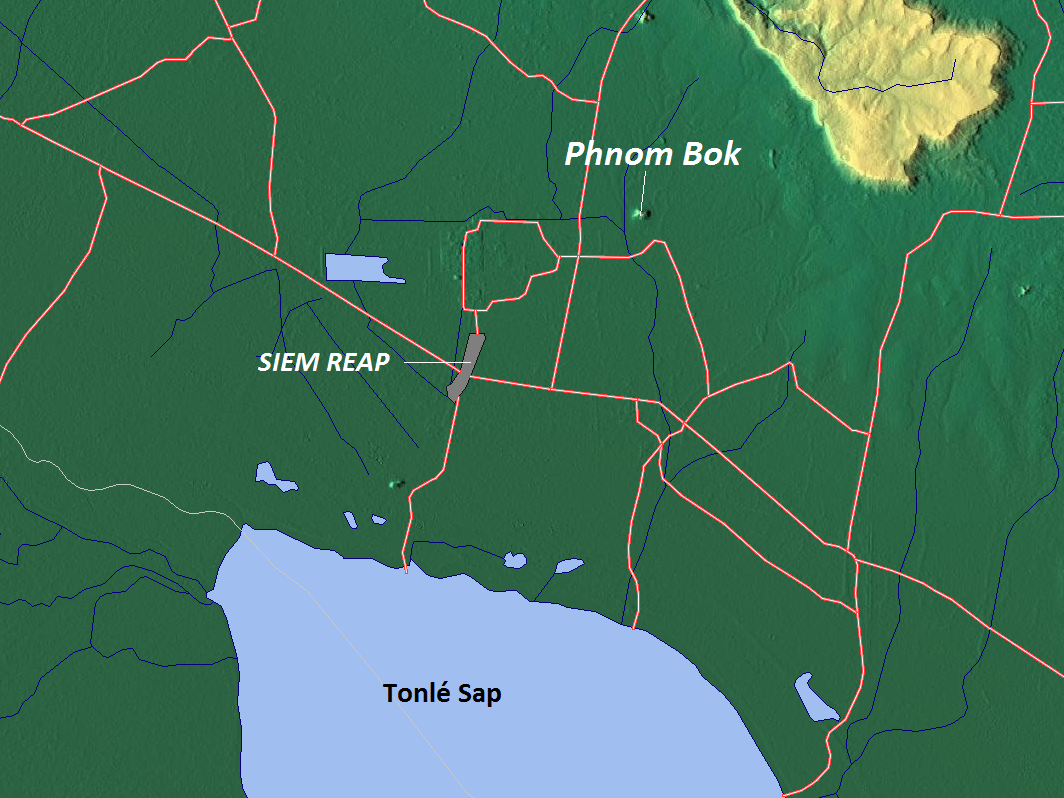
Map

Phnom Bok is the third natural hill site. Its elevation is 221 metres (725 ft). The hill is about 25 kilometres (16 mi) northeast of Siem Reap. It is approached from the road to Banteay Srei. An eastbound road leads to Banteay Samré for another 6 kilometres (3.7 mi) from whence the hill is approached through 635 wide steps leading to the top where the Phnom Bok temple is situated. From the top of this mountain, though the temple is seen mostly in ruins, the panoramic vistas seen all round are of the Tonlé Sap Lake, the Phnom Kulen to the north and vast plains of rice fields to the south. Like Phnom Krom, Phnom Bok consists of sandstone which has a relatively high magnetic susceptibility.

== History ==
Yasovarman I, son of Indravarman I (his capital was at Hariharalaya), shifted the capital to Yashodarapura (the first Angkor capital meaning "The City That Bears Glory"). The temples that he built, apart from Phnom Bok in 910 AD consisted of the Lolei (893 AD), Preah Vihear (893 AD), Phnom Bakheng, the Royal temple (900 AD) and Phnom Krom (910 AD). However, Yashovarman did not choose Phnom Bok as the capital city, near the city of Hariharalaya, as he considered it unsuitable due to its "awkward and too high" a location to mark as the centre of the city. He did not choose Phnom Krom hill either, as he considered it too close to the Tonle Sap Lake. Eventually, Phnom Bakhen of the triumvirate of hills was chosen as the capital city due its low height and large expanse of land available to establish a capital city. His objective was also to build a temple for housing a linga, which surpassed his father's Indresvara and named it as Yashodaresvara. He also named his capital as Yashodarapura, which became the first capital city of Angkor. He, however, installed the Trimurtis in the temples on the other two hills of Phnom Bok and Phnom Krom. Statues of the Hindu Trimurti were found at both Phnom Bok and Phnom Krom.

== Architecture ==
Prasat Phnom Bok, rectangular in shape and attributed to the reign of Yasovarman I, is similar in design to the Phnom Krom prasat. However, while the Phnom Krom central tower is higher than the other two flanking towers, the Phnom Bok prasat has three identical sanctum towers in a row on a single terrace.

The temple is an Angkor monument. It is dedicated to the Trimurti of the Hindu pantheon: the Brahma, Vishnu and Maheshwara or Shiva. It was built in Bakheng style (893–927) and designed with individual sanctums, which have door openings to the east and west. These are raised on a foundation with a plinth made of laterite stone. Frontons of Bakheng and Phnom Bok are said to "represent heads of the entire thirty-three deities of the Hindu pantheon. There is said to be a "fine example of the head of Shiva in the Chandrasekhara form with the moon prominent on his locks" at the temple. The summer solstice occurring over Phnom Bok hill temple, which had the images of Trimurtis defied in it, can be observed from the temple's western entrance.

Angkor monuments built in Angkor period architecture in Bakheng style were made of sandstone and laterite but brickwork was also adopted. Laterite has been used for the walls, platforms and pavements. Greyish yellow sandstone was the main stonework used in the temples.

Though the temple is in a good condition, there is over growth of two large frangipani (Plumeria) trees over the ruined temple towers. It is said that when the flowers bloom on these trees, the appearance of "some sort of extravagant haircut" is discerned.
