= Phnom Bakheng =

- ភ្នំបាខែង
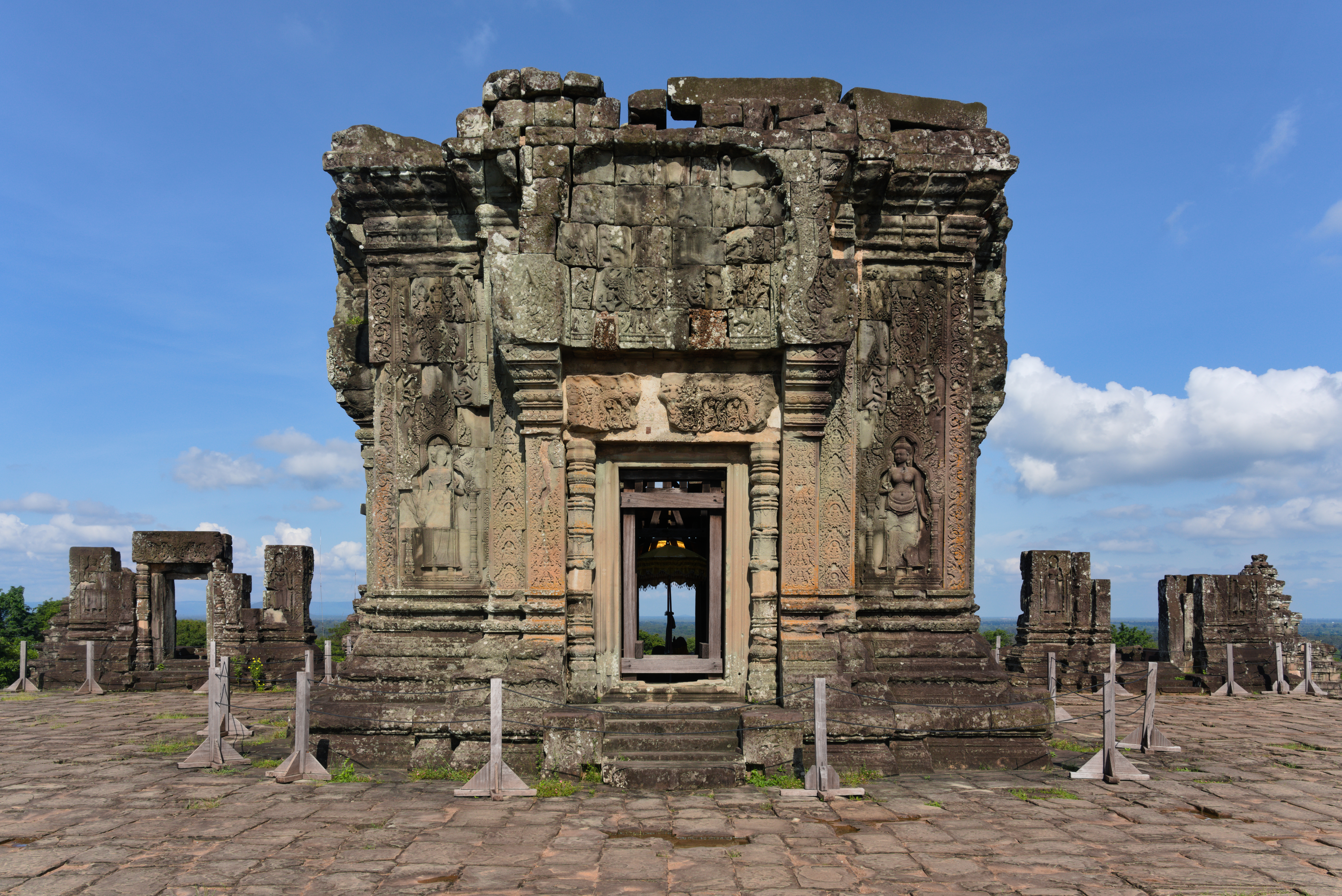
- The central tower of the temple, September 2022

- Location in Cambodia

Religion
- Affiliation: Hinduism
- Deity: Shiva

Location
- Location: Angkor, Siem Reap Province
- Country: Cambodia
- Coordinates: 13.42418°N 103.85601°E

Architecture
- Type: Khmer (Bakheng style)
- Creator: Yasovarman I
- Completed: 889–910 AD

Phnom Bakheng
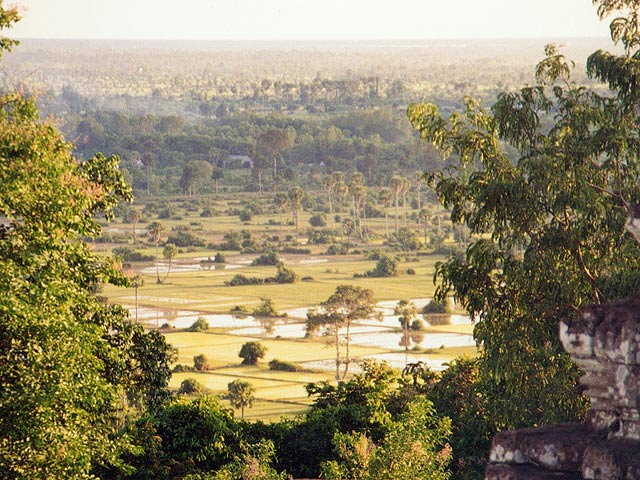
- View from the hill

Highest point
- Elevation: 79 m (259 ft)
- Coordinates: 13°25′25″N 103°51′22″E

Geography
- Location in Cambodia
- Location: Angkor, Siem Reap Province, Cambodia

Climbing
- Easiest route: Hiking

Phnom Bakheng (Khmer: ភ្នំបាខែង [pʰnom baːkʰaeŋ]) is a Buddhist temple in the form of a temple mountain at Angkor, in Siem Reap Province, Cambodia. Originally a Hindu temple dedicated to Shiva, it was built at the end of the 9th century, during the reign of King Yasovarman (r. 889–910). Located atop a hill, it is nowadays a popular tourist spot for sunset views of the much bigger temple Angkor Wat, which lies amid the jungle about 1.5 km to the southeast. The large number of visitors makes Phnom Bakheng one of the most threatened monuments of Angkor. Since 2004, the World Monuments Fund has been working to conserve the temple in partnership with APSARA.

== History ==
Phnom Bakheng, built more than two centuries before Angkor Wat, was once the main temple in the Angkor region. It was the central architectural feature of a new capital called Yasodharapura, established by Yasovarman when he moved the court from the old capital, Hariharalaya, in the southeast Roluos area.

An inscription dated 1052 AD and found at the Sdok Kak Thom temple in present-day Thailand states in Sanskrit: "When Sri Yasovardhana became king under the name of Yasovarman, the able Vamasiva continued as his guru. By the king's order, he set up a linga on Sri Yasodharagiri, a mountain equal in beauty to the king of mountains." Scholars believe that this passage refers to the consecration of the Phnom Bakheng temple approximately a century and a half earlier.

Phnom Bakheng is one of 3 hilltop temples in the Angkor region that are attributed to Yasovarman's reign. The other two are Phnom Krom to the south near the Tonle Sap Lake, and Phnom Bok, northeast of the East Baray reservoir.

Workers built a protective outer moat around the mountain and temple.Avenues were extending in the north, south, east, and west directions from the mountain. A raised pathway, first going northwest to southeast from the old capital to the new capital's outer moat and then turning to go east to west, connected directly to the east entrance of the temple.

Later in its history, Phnom Bakheng was converted into a Buddhist temple. A monumental Sitting Buddha, now lost, was created on its upper tier. Across its west side, a Reclining Buddha of similar scale was crafted in stone. The outlines of this figure are still visible.

== Symbolism ==
Phnom Bakheng is a symbolic representation of Mount Meru, home of the Hindu gods, a status emphasized by the temple's location atop a steep hill 65 m above the surrounding plain. The temple is built in a pyramid form of seven levels, representing the seven heavens. At the top level, five sandstone sanctuaries, in various states of repair, stand in a quincunx pattern—one in the center and one at each corner of the level's square. Originally, 108 small towers were arrayed around the temple at ground level and on various of its tiers; most of them have collapsed.

Jean Filliozat of the Ecole Francaise, a leading Western authority on Indian cosmology and astronomy, interpreted the symbolism of the temple. The temple sits on a rectangular base and rises in five levels and is crowned by five main towers. One hundred four smaller towers are distributed over the lower four levels, placed so symmetrically that only 33 can be seen from the center of any side. Thirty-three is the number of gods who dwelt on Mount Meru. Phnom Bakheng's total number of towers is also significant. The center one represents the axis of the world and the 108 smaller ones represent the four lunar phases, each with 27 days. The seven levels of the monument represent the seven heavens and each terrace contains 12 towers which represent the 12-year cycle of Jupiter. According to University of Chicago scholar Paul Wheatley, it is "an astronomical calendar in stone."

Following Angkor's rediscovery by the outside world in the mid-19th century, decades passed before archaeologists grasped Phnom Bakheng's historical significance. For many years, scholars' consensus view was that the Bayon, the temple located at the center of Angkor Thom city, was the edifice to which the Sdok Kak Thom inscription referred. Later work identified the Bayon as a Buddhist site, built almost three centuries later than originally thought, in the late 12th century, and Phnom Bakheng as King Yasovarman's state temple.

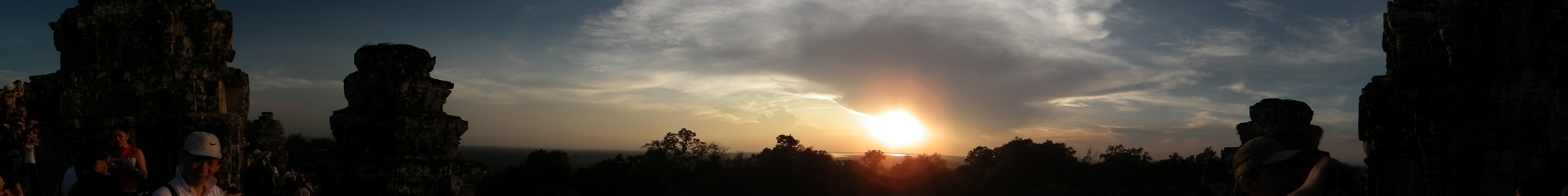
Sun set of Phnom Bakheng

== Phnom Bakheng in popular media ==
The view of Angkor Wat from the top of Phnom Bakheng is featured in the movie Tomb Raider (when Lara Croft looks through the binoculars upon arriving in Cambodia).

== Gallery ==
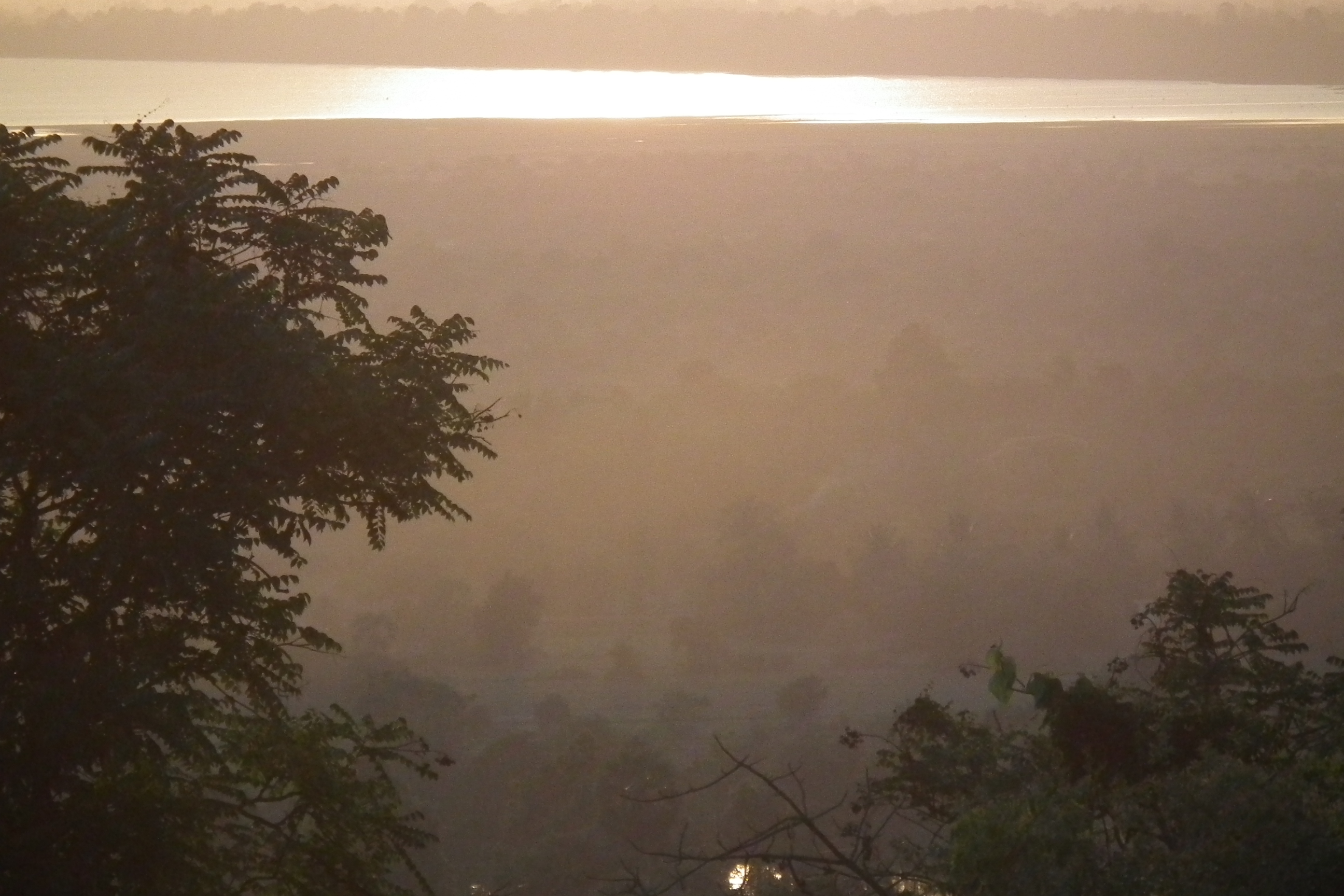
Tonlé Sap seen from Phnom Bakheng

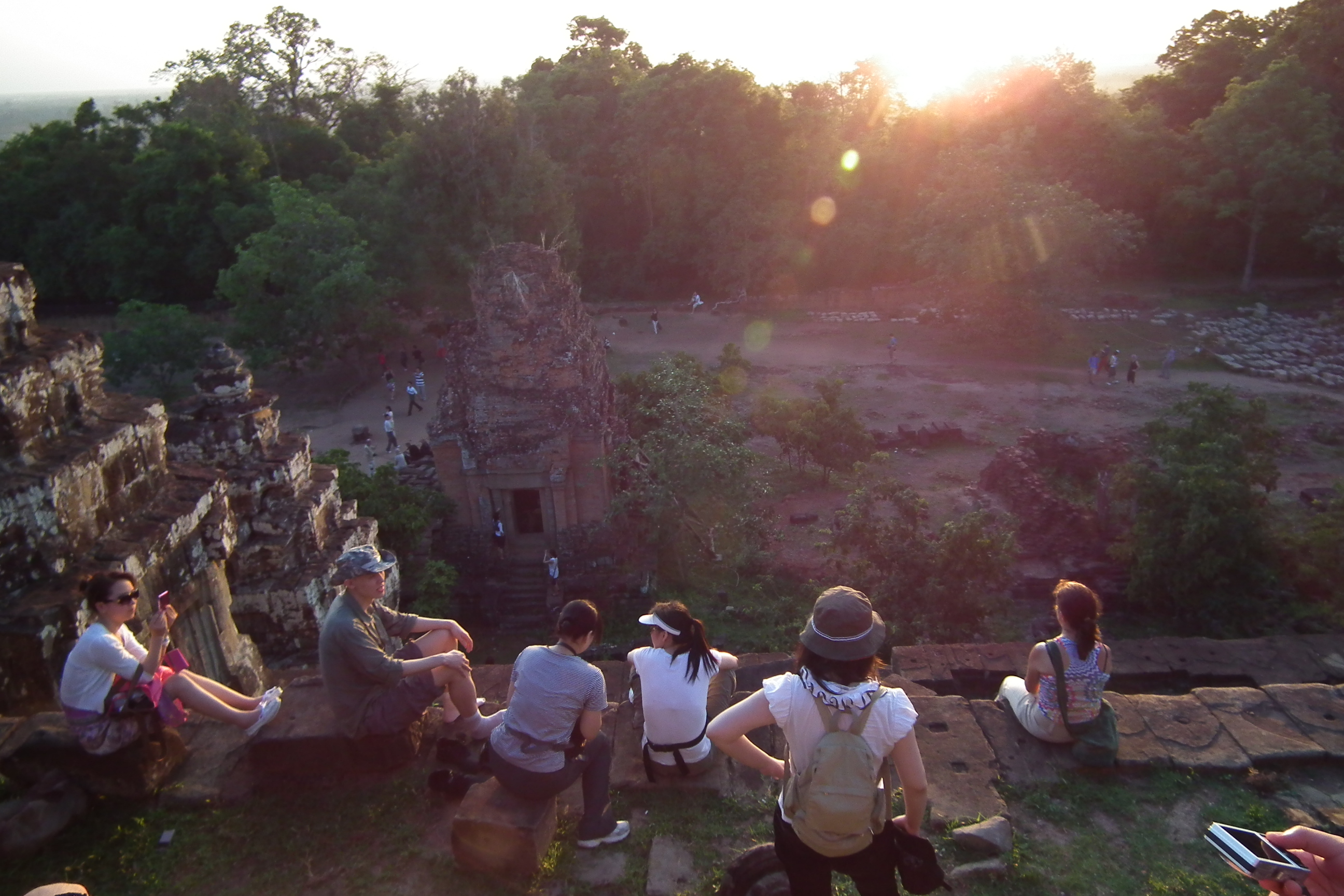
Phnom Bakheng is a viewpoint of the setting sun

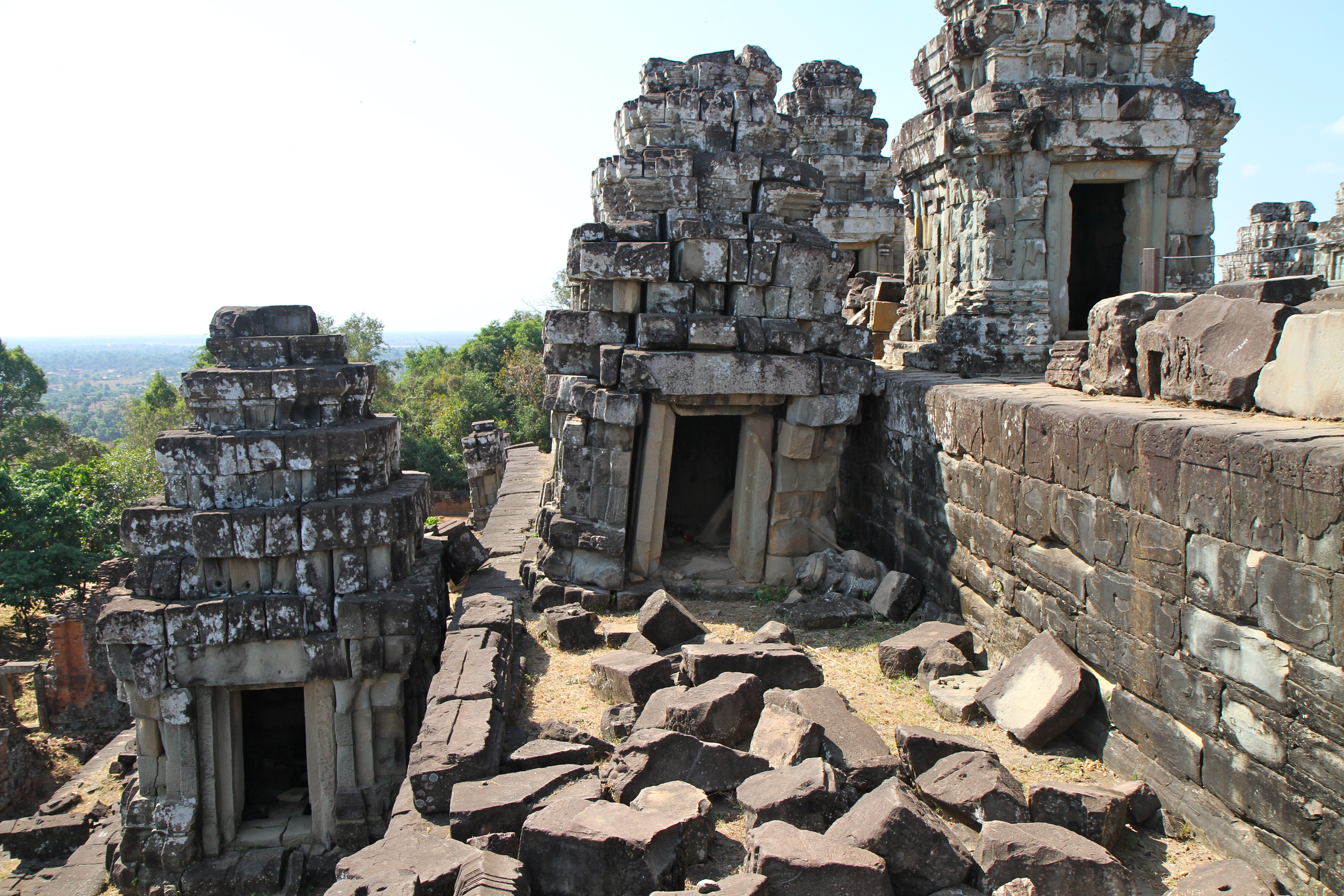
Phnom Bakheng

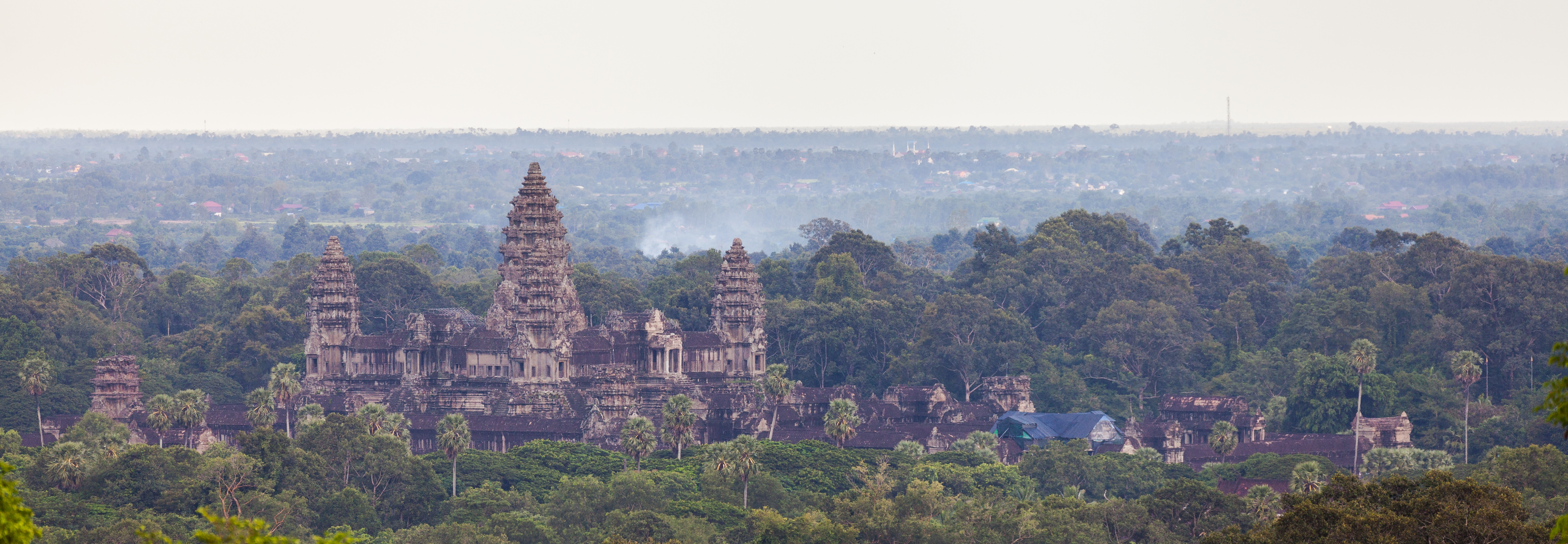
Angkor Wat seen from Phnom Bakheng at sunset

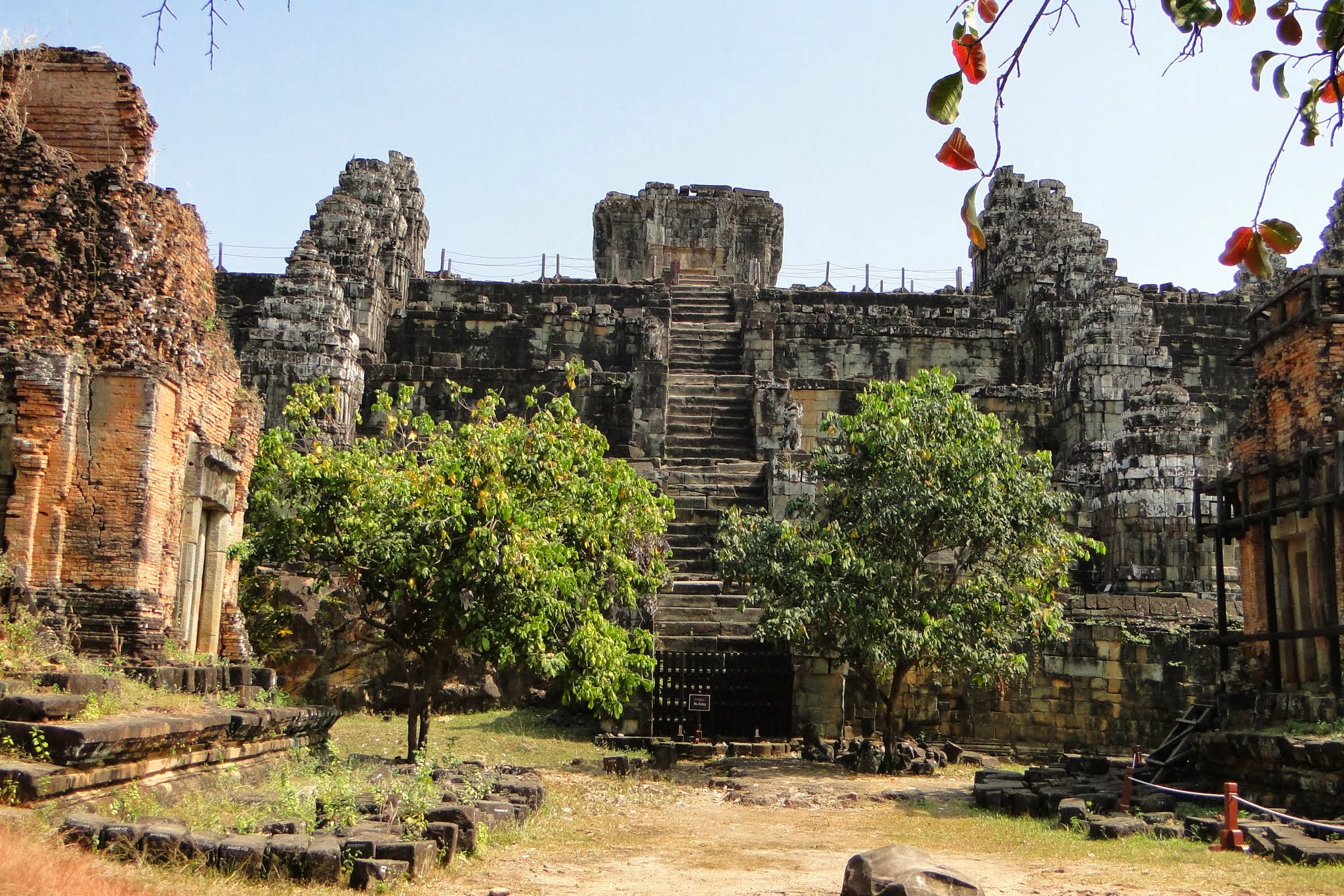
General view

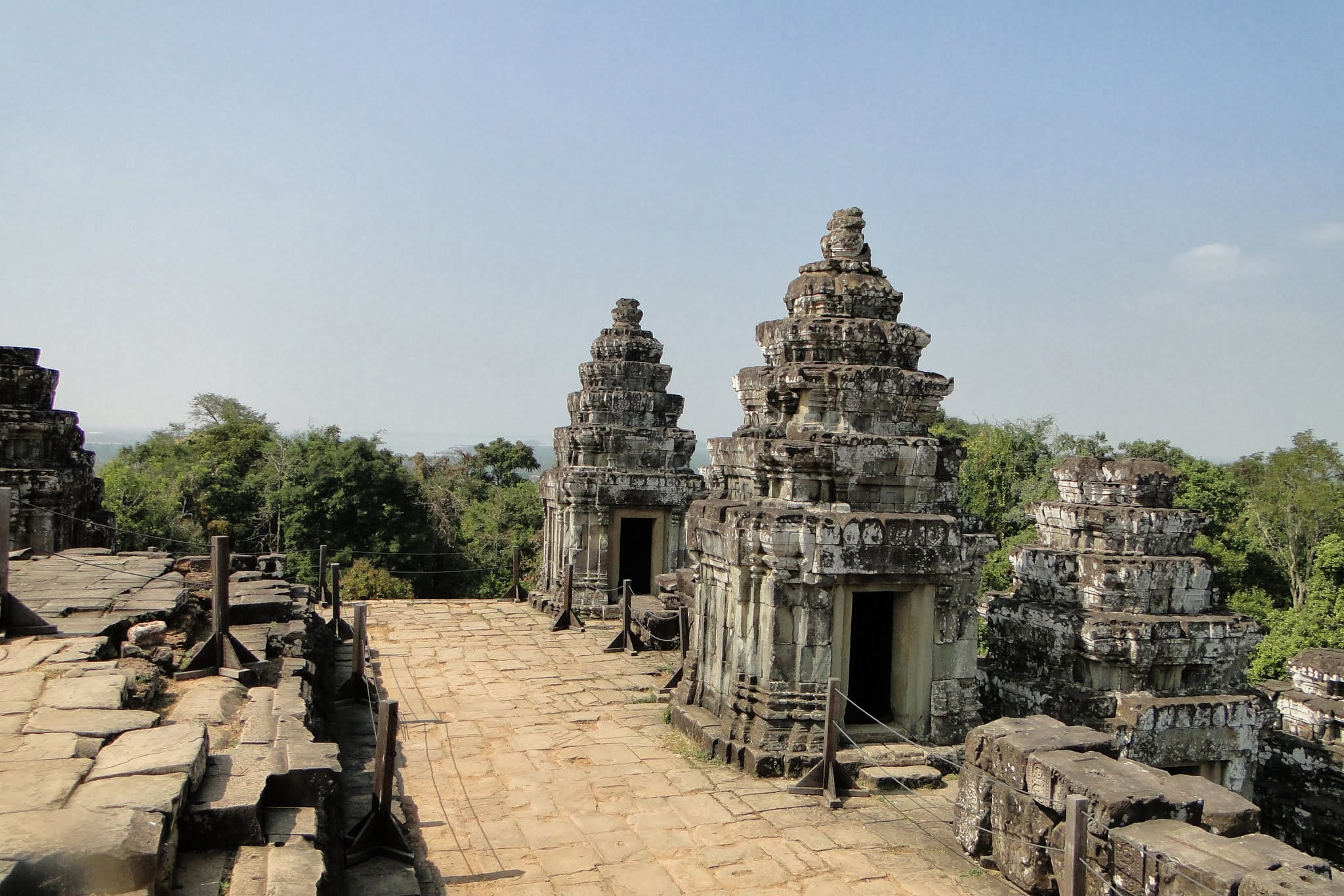
Upper terrace

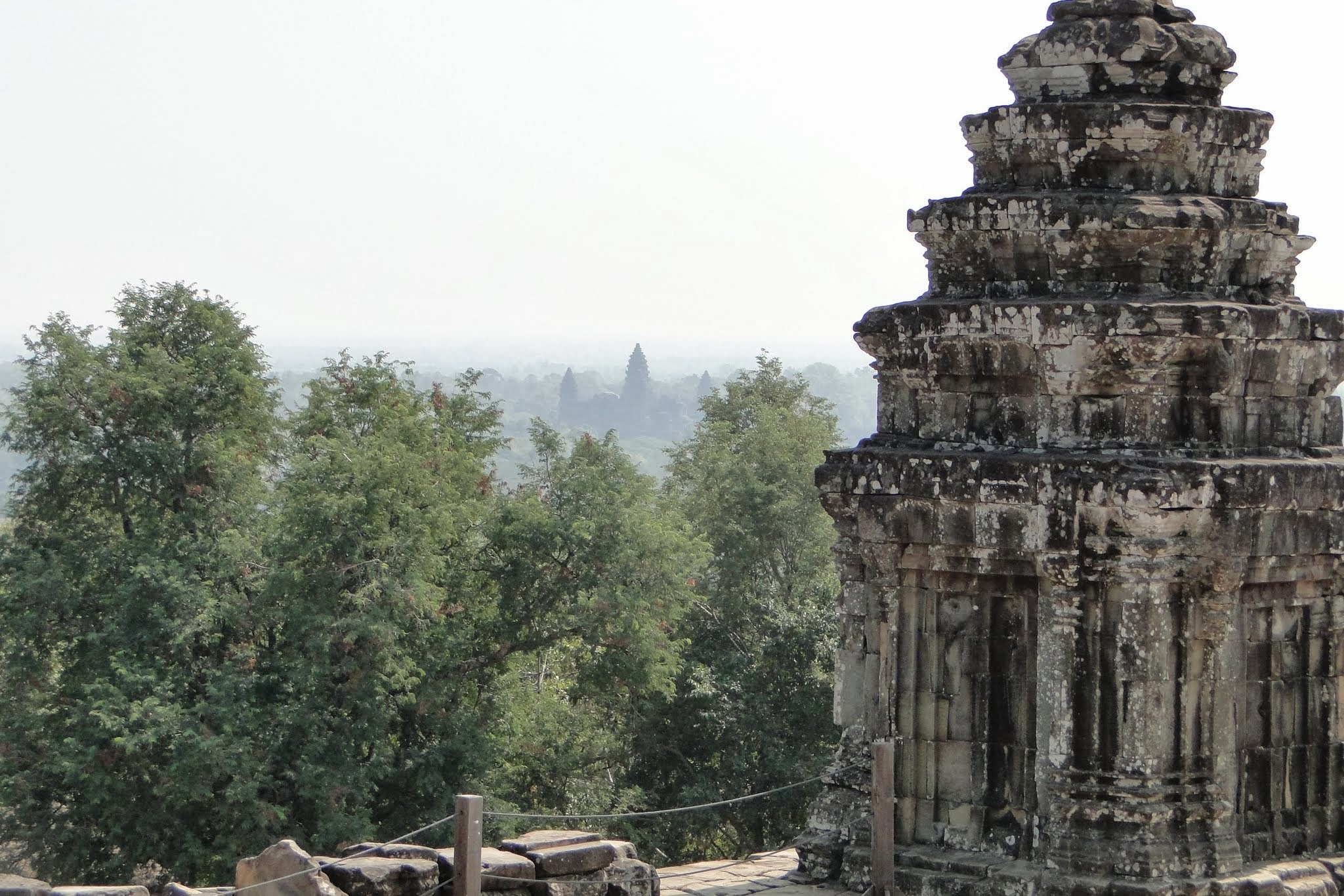
Stone tower and Angkor Wat far afield

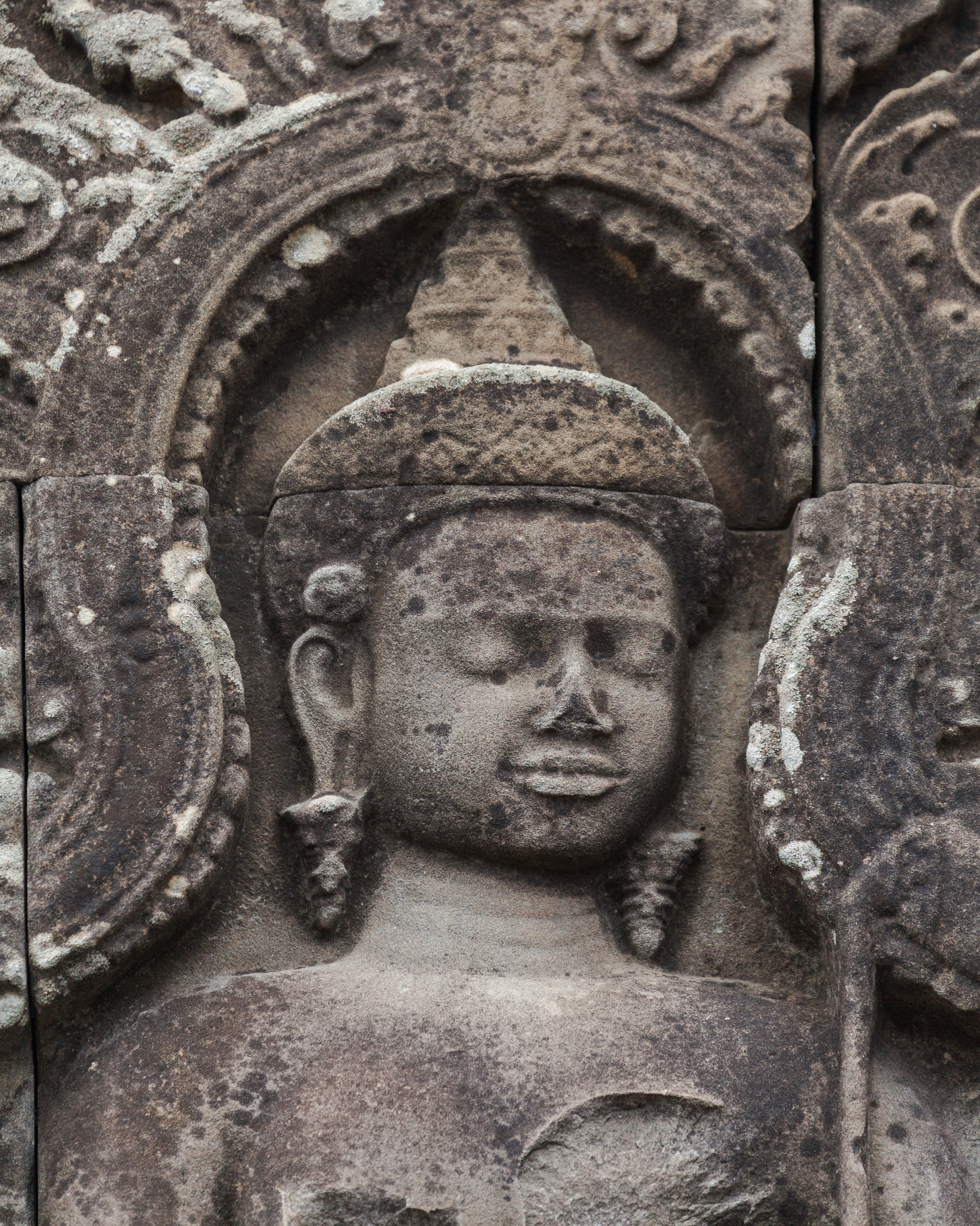
Bas-relief in Phnom Bakheng

== See also ==
- Angkor
- Architecture of Cambodia
- List of archaeoastronomical sites by country
