= Big Moose, New York =

- Hamlet
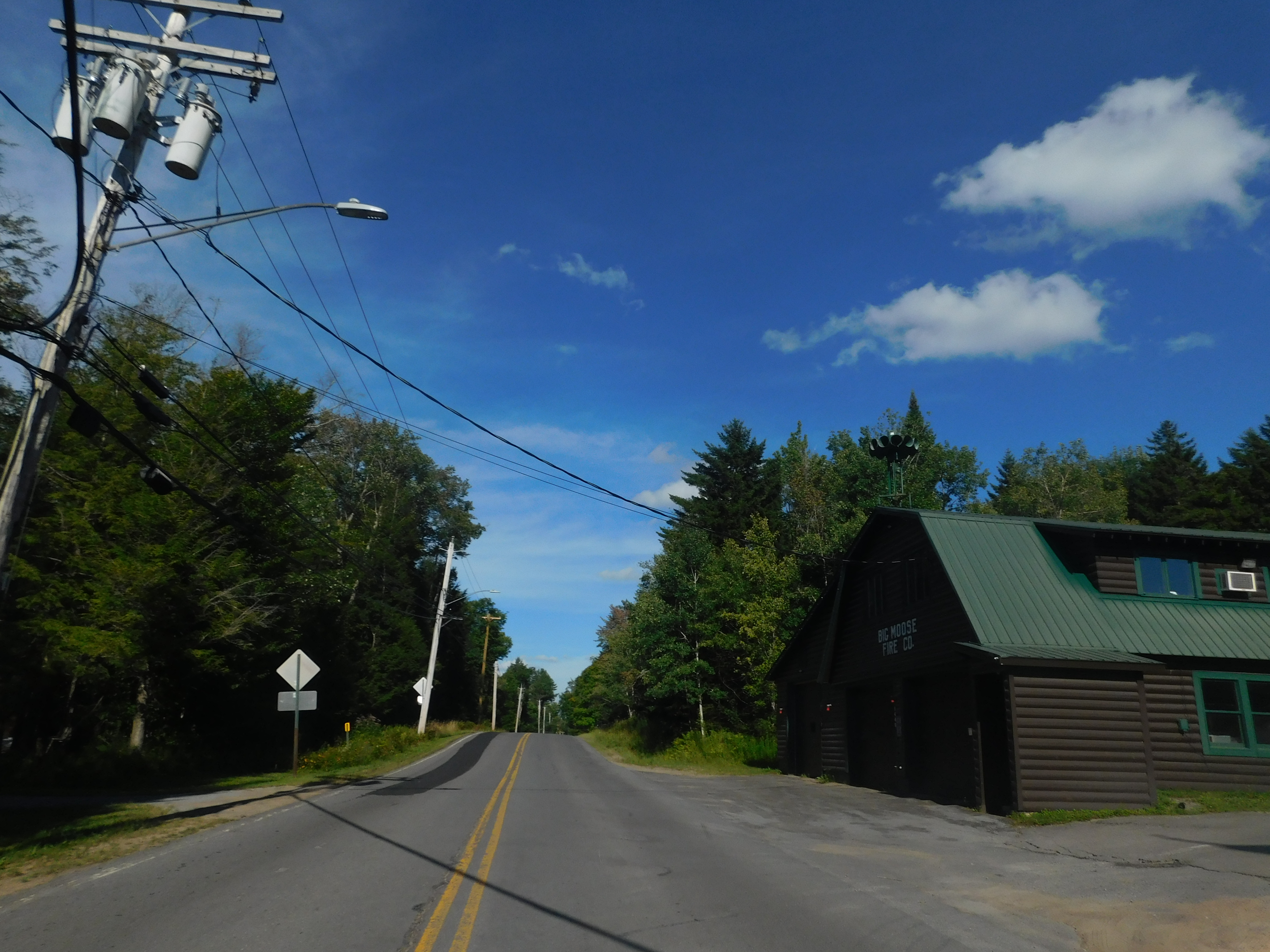
- Herkimer County Route 1 southbound at the Big Moose fire station.

- Location within New York Location within the United States
- Coordinates: 43°49′06″N 74°54′55″W
- State: New York
- County: Herkimer
- Town: Webb
- Elevation: 626 m (2,054 ft)
- Time zone: UTC-5 (Eastern (EST))
  - Summer (DST): UTC-4 (EDT)

Big Moose is a hamlet located in the Town of Webb in Herkimer County, New York, United States. Big Moose Lake is located east-northeast of the hamlet of Big Moose.

== Climate ==
Climate data for Big Moose, New York, 1991–2020 normals: 1760ft (536m)
Month	Jan	Feb	Mar	Apr	May	Jun	Jul	Aug	Sep	Oct	Nov	Dec	Year
Record high °F (°C)	59 (15)	60 (16)	78 (26)	88 (31)	91 (33)	92 (33)	92 (33)	93 (34)	95 (35)	82 (28)	69 (21)	60 (16)	95 (35)
Mean maximum °F (°C)	49 (9)	49 (9)	60 (16)	74 (23)	84 (29)	87 (31)	88 (31)	86 (30)	84 (29)	76 (24)	63 (17)	50 (10)	89 (32)
Mean daily maximum °F (°C)	27.9 (−2.3)	31.4 (−0.3)	40.0 (4.4)	53.8 (12.1)	67.6 (19.8)	75.2 (24.0)	78.8 (26.0)	78.3 (25.7)	71.4 (21.9)	57.7 (14.3)	44.1 (6.7)	32.6 (0.3)	54.9 (12.7)
Daily mean °F (°C)	17.4 (−8.1)	18.9 (−7.3)	27.9 (−2.3)	41.2 (5.1)	54.5 (12.5)	62.6 (17.0)	66.5 (19.2)	65.4 (18.6)	58.6 (14.8)	46.4 (8.0)	34.6 (1.4)	23.4 (−4.8)	43.1 (6.2)
Mean daily minimum °F (°C)	6.9 (−13.9)	6.4 (−14.2)	15.7 (−9.1)	28.5 (−1.9)	41.3 (5.2)	50.0 (10.0)	54.2 (12.3)	52.5 (11.4)	45.8 (7.7)	35.2 (1.8)	25.2 (−3.8)	14.1 (−9.9)	31.3 (−0.4)
Mean minimum °F (°C)	−27 (−33)	−22 (−30)	−15 (−26)	9 (−13)	25 (−4)	34 (1)	40 (4)	38 (3)	29 (−2)	19 (−7)	4 (−16)	−15 (−26)	−30 (−34)
Record low °F (°C)	−45 (−43)	−38 (−39)	−29 (−34)	−4 (−20)	17 (−8)	25 (−4)	32 (0)	30 (−1)	18 (−8)	8 (−13)	−18 (−28)	−38 (−39)	−45 (−43)
Average precipitation inches (mm)	3.99 (101)	2.91 (74)	3.07 (78)	3.56 (90)	4.71 (120)	4.57 (116)	4.69 (119)	4.47 (114)	4.43 (113)	5.52 (140)	3.78 (96)	4.07 (103)	49.77 (1,264)
Average snowfall inches (cm)	40.90 (103.9)	34.00 (86.4)	23.20 (58.9)	6.00 (15.2)	0.20 (0.51)	0.00 (0.00)	0.00 (0.00)	0.00 (0.00)	0.00 (0.00)	2.00 (5.1)	12.50 (31.8)	34.70 (88.1)	153.5 (389.91)
Source 1: NOAA
Source 2: XMACIS (records & monthly max/mins)
