= Shelter (disambiguation) =

A shelter is an architectural structure or natural formation providing protection from the environment

Shelter may also refer to:

== Places ==
- Port Shelter, Hong Kong
- Shelter Bay (disambiguation), various locations
- Shelter Cove (disambiguation), various locations
- Shelter Island (disambiguation), various locations
- Shelter Point, in Blue Whale Harbour, South Georgia Island

== Arts, entertainment, and media ==
=== Films ===
- Shelter (1937, 1955, 1979), Encyclopædia Britannica education shorts - see List of Encyclopædia Britannica Films titles
- Shelter, a 1998 film starring John Allen Nelson. Distributed by Showcase Entertainment, currently owned by Notorious Pictures worldwide
- Shelter (2007 film), by Jonah Markowitz
- Shelter (2010 film), directed by Måns Mårlind and Björn Stein
- Shelter (2012 film), directed by Adam Caudill and Wrion Bowling
- Shelter (2014 film), written and directed by Paul Bettany
- Shelter, a 2016 short film produced by A-1 Pictures
- Shelter, a 2017 film produced by Eran Riklis
- Shelter (2026 film), directed by Ric Roman Waugh

=== Television ===
- Harlan Coben's Shelter, a 2023 television series adaptation of Harlan Coben's novel
- "The Shelter" (The Twilight Zone), an episode of the television series

=== Literature ===
- Shelter, a 1941 novel by Marguerite Steen
- Shelter, a 1999 novel by Chaz Brenchley
- Shelter (Palwick novel), a 2007 novel by Susan Palwick
- Shelter (Coben novel), a 2011 novel by Harlan Coben

=== Music ===
==== Groups and labels ====
- Shelter (band), an American Krishnacore band (1991–2018)
- Shelter Records, an American record label (1969–1981)

==== Albums ====
- Shelter (Lone Justice album), 1986
- Shelter (Brand New Heavies album), 1997
- Shelter (Alcest album), 2014
- Shelter (Olivia Chaney album), 2018
- Shelter (soundtrack), a 2008 album from the eponymous 2007 movie
- Shelter, a 2003 album by Rasa
- Shelter, a 2013 album by Ghost Mice and Ramshackle Glory

==== Songs ====
- "Shelter" (The xx song), 2011
- "Shelter" (Porter Robinson and Madeon song), 2016
- "Shelter" (Finneas song), 2019
- "Shelter", a song from Sounding a Mosaic by Bedouin Soundclash
- "Shelter", a song from Everything or Nothing by Carrollton
- "Shelter", a song from Undeceived by Extol
- "Shelter", a song from Lonely God by Fit for a King
- "Shelter", a song from Strange in Stereo by In the Woods...
- "Shelter", a song from The Shelter by Jars of Clay
- "Shelter", a song from The Eye of Every Storm by Neurosis
- "Shelter", a song from Trouble by Ray LaMontagne
- "Shelter", a song from Sundowning (deluxe edition) by Sleep Token
- "Shelter", a song from You Are Here by thenewno2

=== Other uses in arts, entertainment, and media ===
- Shelter (video game), a 2013 video game

== Other uses ==
- Shelter (automobile), a Dutch experimental city car of the 1950s
- Shelter (charity), a UK charitable organisation
- USS Shelter (AM-301), an American minesweeper

== See also ==
- Animal shelter, a place where homeless, lost, or abandoned animals, mostly dogs and cats, are housed
- Homeless shelter, a place providing food and accommodation for the homeless
- Women's shelter, a refuge for women escaping domestic violence and intimate partner violence
- Shelter rule, a doctrine in the common law of property
- The Shelter (disambiguation)
