= Dollar Island =

Island in Hamilton County, New York, United States

- Location within New York

Geography
- Location: Fourth Lake
- Coordinates: 43°45′39″N 74°48′22″W
- Highest elevation: 1,706 ft (520 m)

Administration
- United States
- State: New York
- County: Hamilton
- Town: Inlet

Dollar Island is an island on Fourth Lake in Hamilton County, New York. It is less than an acre in size and sits no more than six feet above the water. As the Fulton Chain of Lakes began to develop following the construction of a dam in Old Forge in 1811, a letter written in 1849 refers "a small island called Dollar Island from the rotundity of its shape." The Camp on Dollar Island was constructed by guide Fred Hess for Dr. Edward Gaylord, an early summer resident of the area, in the mid 1880s. Dr. Gaylord died in 1925 bequeathing the Camp to his long-time nurse/companion, Edith Smith, who continued to summer on the Island until 1960. The two-story log structure remains largely original with the addition of a solar powered water pump, 12v DC lighting, and propane powered kitchen. It has been occupied continuously since its construction in the 1880's and was placed on the National Register of Historic Places in 2017.
