= Upper Browns Tract Pond =

- Location within New York Location within the United States
- Location: Hamilton County, New York
- Coordinates: 43°48′00″N 74°42′35″W
- Type: Lake
- Primary inflows: Lower Browns Tract Pond
- Basin countries: United States
- Surface area: 51 acres (0.21 km^{2})
- Average depth: 8 feet (2.4 m)
- Max. depth: 27 feet (8.2 m)
- Shore length^{1}: 1.2 miles (1.9 km)
- Surface elevation: 1,765 feet (538 m)
- Settlements: Inlet, New York
- ^{1} Shore length is not a well-defined measure.

Upper Browns Tract Pond is located northeast of Inlet, New York. The inlet flows through a creek from Lower Browns Tract Pond. Fish species present in the lake are largemouth bass, black bullhead, yellow perch, and sunfish. There is a carry down in the campground off Browns Tract Pond Road. No motors are allowed on this lake.
