= Alger Island (New York) =

Island in New York

- Location within New York

Geography
- Location: Fourth Lake
- Coordinates: 43°44′41″N 74°52′40″W, 43°44′43″N 74°52′47″W
- Highest elevation: 1,706 ft (520 m)

Administration
- United States
- State: New York
- County: Herkimer
- Town: Webb

Alger Island, also known as Big Island, is a small island located on Fourth Lake, part of the Fulton Chain of Lakes, within the Adirondack Park in New York State. The island is located in the Town of Webb, in Herkimer County, New York.

Alger Island was called Deer Island in the late 18th century. It was later called Big Island. Alger Island came from the family name of its longtime owners, father and son Mort and Ollie Alger.

Alger Island was purchased by the state of New York on January 16, 1950. Lean-tos were constructed during the 1960s. Today, the island is operated as a state campground, managed by the New York State Department of Environmental Conservation. The island is accessible only by boat.
