= East Coast of the United States =

Atlantic coastal region of the United States

- Coastline
- The East Coast of the United States. States with a coastline on the Atlantic Ocean are highlighted in dark blue. States considered part of the East Coast but without a coastline on the Atlantic (as well as the District of Columbia, which is not a state) are highlighted in light blue.
- Country: United States
- Principal cities: Portland; Boston; Providence; Hartford; New York City; Newark Philadelphia; Baltimore; Washington, D.C.; Richmond; Virginia Beach; Raleigh; Charlotte; Charleston; Atlanta; Jacksonville; Orlando; Tampa; Miami
- Largest city: New York City
- Largest metropolitan area: New York metropolitan area

Population (2020 census)
  - Total: 122,601,503 (Note: The population totals consist of the combined population of Connecticut, Delaware, the District of Columbia, Florida, Georgia, Maine, Maryland, Massachusetts, New Hampshire, New Jersey, New York, North Carolina, Pennsylvania, Rhode Island, South Carolina, Vermont, Virginia, and West Virginia, according to the 2020 United States census and 2024 Census Bureau estimates.)
  - Estimate (2024): 127,509,444

Time zones
- most of East Coast: UTC– 05:00 (Eastern)
  - Summer (DST): UTC– 04:00 (EDT)
- Florida Panhandle west of the Apalachicola River: UTC– 06:00 (Central)
  - Summer (DST): – 05:00

The East Coast of the United States, also known as the Eastern Seaboard, the Atlantic Coast, and the Atlantic Seaboard, is the region encompassing the coastline where the Eastern United States meets the Atlantic Ocean; it has always played a major socioeconomic role in the development of the United States.

The region is generally understood to include the U.S. states that border the Atlantic Ocean: Connecticut, Delaware, Florida, Georgia, Maine, Maryland, Massachusetts, New Hampshire, New Jersey, New York, North Carolina, Rhode Island, South Carolina, and Virginia, as well as some landlocked states (Pennsylvania, Vermont, West Virginia, and the district of Washington, D.C.).

== Toponymy and composition ==
The toponym derives from the concept that the contiguous 48 states are defined by two major coastlines, one at the western edge and one on the eastern edge. Other terms for referring to this area include the Eastern seaboard, which is another term for coastline, Atlantic Coast, and Atlantic Seaboard because the coastline lies along the Atlantic Ocean.

The 14 states that have a shoreline on the Atlantic Ocean are (from north to south) Maine, New Hampshire, Massachusetts, Rhode Island, Connecticut, New York, New Jersey, Delaware, Maryland, Virginia, North Carolina, South Carolina, Georgia, and Florida. Pennsylvania and Washington, D.C. border the Delaware River and the Potomac River, respectively, both of which are tidal arms of the Atlantic Ocean.

== Colonial history ==
The original Thirteen Colonies of Great Britain in North America all lay on or near the East Coast. (Note: Those colonies were New Hampshire, Massachusetts Bay, Rhode Island and Providence Plantations, Connecticut, New York, New Jersey, Pennsylvania, Delaware, Maryland, Virginia, North Carolina, South Carolina, and Georgia. While Pennsylvania is not directly along the Atlantic shoreline, it borders the tidal portion of the Delaware River and the city of Philadelphia was a major seaport.)

Two additional U.S. states on the East Coast were not among the original Thirteen Colonies: Maine became part of Massachusetts Bay Colony in 1677 and Florida was held by the British from the end of the French and Indian War until 1781 and was part of New Spain until 1821.

In present-day Florida, Spanish explorer Juan Ponce de León made the first textual records of the state during his 1513 voyage. The state was initially named for Ponce de León, who called the peninsula La Pascua Florida in recognition of the verdant landscape and because it was the Easter season.

Delaware Colony and the provinces of New Jersey, New York, and Pennsylvania had been colonized by the Dutch as New Netherland until they were ceded to the British in the mid- to late-17th century. From 1777 to 1791, Vermont was an independent nation as the Vermont Republic.

== Geography and climate ==
Climate map of the contiguous United States, according to the Trewartha climate classification

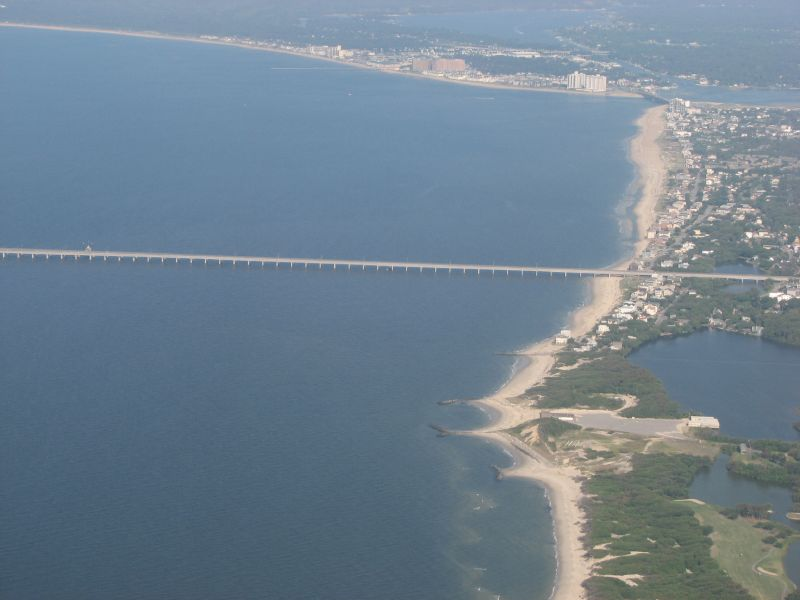
Aerial view of the Virginia Beach entrance to the Chesapeake Bay Bridge–Tunnel

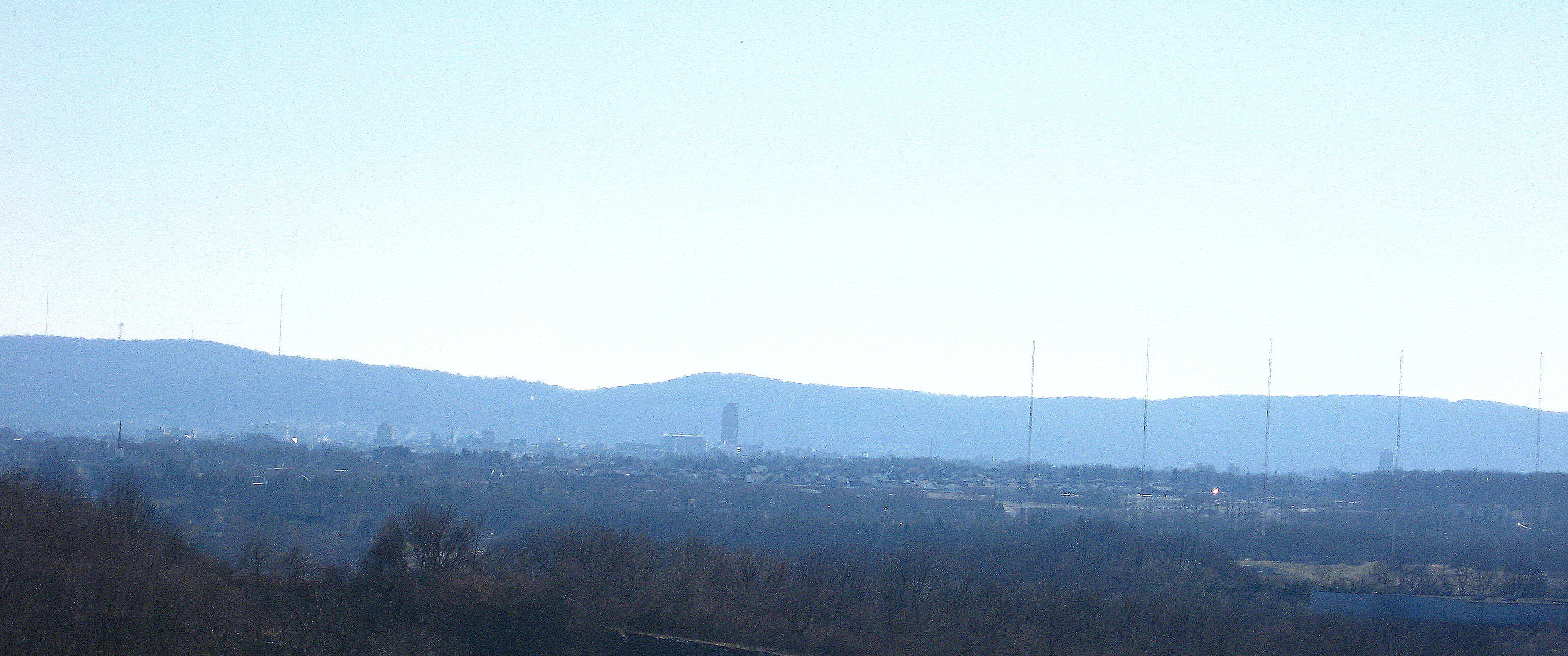
South Mountain in eastern Pennsylvania with Allentown in the foreground in December 2010

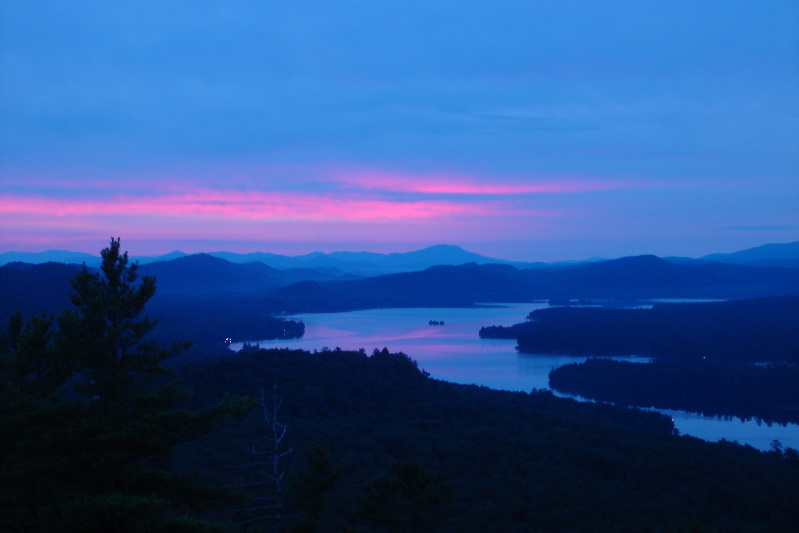
The Fulton Chain of Lakes in Adirondack Park in Upstate New York in August 2007

In simplest terms, three (3) basic climate regions occur on the East Coast; 1) A cold-winter continental climate, from the US-Canadian border south to southern Rhode Island and western Maryland, 2) a temperate climate, from coastal Rhode Island south to western North Carolina, and 3) a subtropical climate from extreme southeast Virginia south to central Florida.

The humid continental climate region (Dfa/Dfb/Dc) includes Maine, New Hampshire, Vermont, most of Massachusetts, most of Rhode Island, almost all of Connecticut, most of New York State, most of North Jersey, most of Pennsylvania, and western Maryland. This region features warm to occasionally hot summers and cold winters with frequent snow (especially in Maine, Vermont, and New Hampshire). All locations have a least one month with a mean temperature below 0 °C (32 °F) and four to seven months averaging above 10 °C (50 °F).

The area from extreme southern Rhode Island southward (areas of coastal Connecticut, Long Island, New York City, most of New Jersey, most of Delaware, most of Maryland, most of Virginia, and western NC) has a warm temperate climate (Cfa/Do) with long, hot, humid summers and cool to cold winters with occasional snow. The mean temparature in the coldest month is 0 °C (32 °F) or higher. Normally, at least one month has a mean temperature over 22 °C (71.6 °F) and six to seven months average above 10 °C (50 °F)..

The area from the southern Delmarva Peninsula, southeast Virginia, and central North Carolina south to central Florida is humid subtropical (Cfa/Cf), with hot summers that have almost daily (but brief) thundershowers and mild and drier winters. In this zone, at least eight months have a mean temperature above 10 °C (50 °F). The region of Florida from the south-central region of the state south to the Florida Keys has a tropical climate (Af/Aw/Ar) that is usually frost-free and warm to hot all year, and all of the 12 months of the year average above 18 °C (64.4 °F). This region of Florida is the only tropical climate in the continental United States.

The least common climate on the East Coast is the oceanic (Cfb/Do), which is only found on Block Island, Nantucket, and the Outer Cape and Chatham on Cape Cod, and in areas of the southern Appalachian Mountains. This zone has all monthly averages between 0 and 22 °C and six to seven months above 50 °F. Although winter precipitation is more likely to fall as rain than as snow, occasional heavy snow is possible.

Although landfalls are rare, the Eastern Seaboard is susceptible to hurricanes in the Atlantic hurricane season, officially running from June 1 to November 30, although hurricanes can occur before or after these dates. Hurricanes Hazel, Hugo, Bob, Isabel, Irene, and Sandy, and most recently Florence, Isaias, Henri, and Ida are some of the more significant storms to have affected the region.

The East Coast, with the exception of Eastern Maine, is a low relief, passive margin coast. It has been shaped by the Pleistocene glaciation in the far northern areas in New England, with offshore islands such as Nantucket, Martha's Vineyard, Block Island, and Fishers Island. From northern New Jersey southward, the coastal plain broadens southwards, separated from the Piedmont region by the Atlantic Seaboard fall line of the East Coast rivers, often marking the head of navigation and prominent sites of cities.

The coastal areas from Long Island south to Florida are often made up of barrier islands that front the coastal areas, with the long stretches of sandy beaches. Many of the larger capes along the lower East Coast are in fact barrier islands, like the Outer Banks of North Carolina and Cape Canaveral, Florida. The Florida Keys are made up of limestone coral and provide the only coral reefs on the U.S. mainland.

== Demographics ==
In 2010, the population of the states that have shoreline on the East Coast was estimated at 112,642,503 (about 36% of the country's total population). New York City is both the largest city and the largest metropolitan area on the East Coast. The East Coast is the most populated coastal area in the United States.

Major East Coast cities and metropolitan areas
City	City Population (2018 est.)	Metro Population (2018 est.)	State
Alexandria	159,428	6,216,589	Virginia
Allentown	125,845	861,889	Pennsylvania
Atlanta	498,044	5,949,951	Georgia
Augusta	196,939	600,151	Georgia
Baltimore	602,495	2,802,789	Maryland
Boston	694,583	4,628,910	Massachusetts
Bridgeport	144,900	939,904	Connecticut
Charleston	136,208	802,122	South Carolina
Charlotte	872,498	2,636,883	North Carolina
Chesapeake	244,835	1,672,319	Virginia
Columbia, MD	103,467	6,216,589	Maryland
Columbia, SC	133,451	838,433	South Carolina
Coral Springs	133,507	5,762,717	Florida
Durham	264,310	2,106,463	North Carolina
Edison	100,693	19,979,477	New Jersey
Elizabeth	128,885	19,979,477	New Jersey
Fayetteville	211,657	526,719	North Carolina
Fort Lauderdale	182,595	5,762,717	Florida
Germantown	90,494	6,216,589	Maryland
Greenville	70,635	920,477	South Carolina
Hampton	134,510	1,672,319	Virginia
Hartford	122,105	1,211,324	Connecticut
Hialeah	238,942	5,828,191	Florida
Hollywood	154,823	5,762,717	Florida
Jacksonville	903,889	1,523,615	Florida
Jersey City	265,549	19,979,477	New Jersey
Miami	470,914	6,158,824	Florida
Miami Gardens	113,069	5,762,717	Florida
Miramar	140,823	5,762,717	Florida
New Haven	130,418	862,477	Connecticut
New York City	8,398,748	19,979,477	New York
Newark	282,090	19,979,477	New Jersey
Newport News	179,225	1,672,319	Virginia
Norfolk	244,076	1,672,319	Virginia
Orlando	285,713	2,387,138	Florida
Palm Bay	114,194	543,376	Florida
Paterson	145,627	19,979,477	New Jersey
Pembroke Pines	172,374	5,762,717	Florida
Philadelphia	1,584,138	6,096,120	Pennsylvania
Pompano Beach	111,954	5,762,717	Florida
Port St. Lucie	195,248	438,095	Florida
Portland	66,417	538,500	Maine
Portsmouth	94,632	1,672,319	Virginia
Providence	179,335	1,604,291	Rhode Island
Raleigh	469,298	1,337,331	North Carolina
Reading	95,112	428,849	Pennsylvania
Richmond	228,783	1,260,029	Virginia
Savannah	145,862	389,494	Georgia
Springfield	153,606	631,982	Massachusetts
Stamford	129,775	916,829	Connecticut
Virginia Beach	450,138	1,725,246	Virginia
Washington, D.C.	705,749	6,216,589	District of Columbia
Waterbury	114,403	864,835	Connecticut
West Palm Beach	111,398	5,762,717	Florida
Wilmington, DE	70,635	6,069,875	Delaware
Wilmington, NC	122,607	282,573	North Carolina
Woodbridge	100,450	19,979,477	New Jersey
Worcester	206,518	862,111	Massachusetts

== Transportation ==
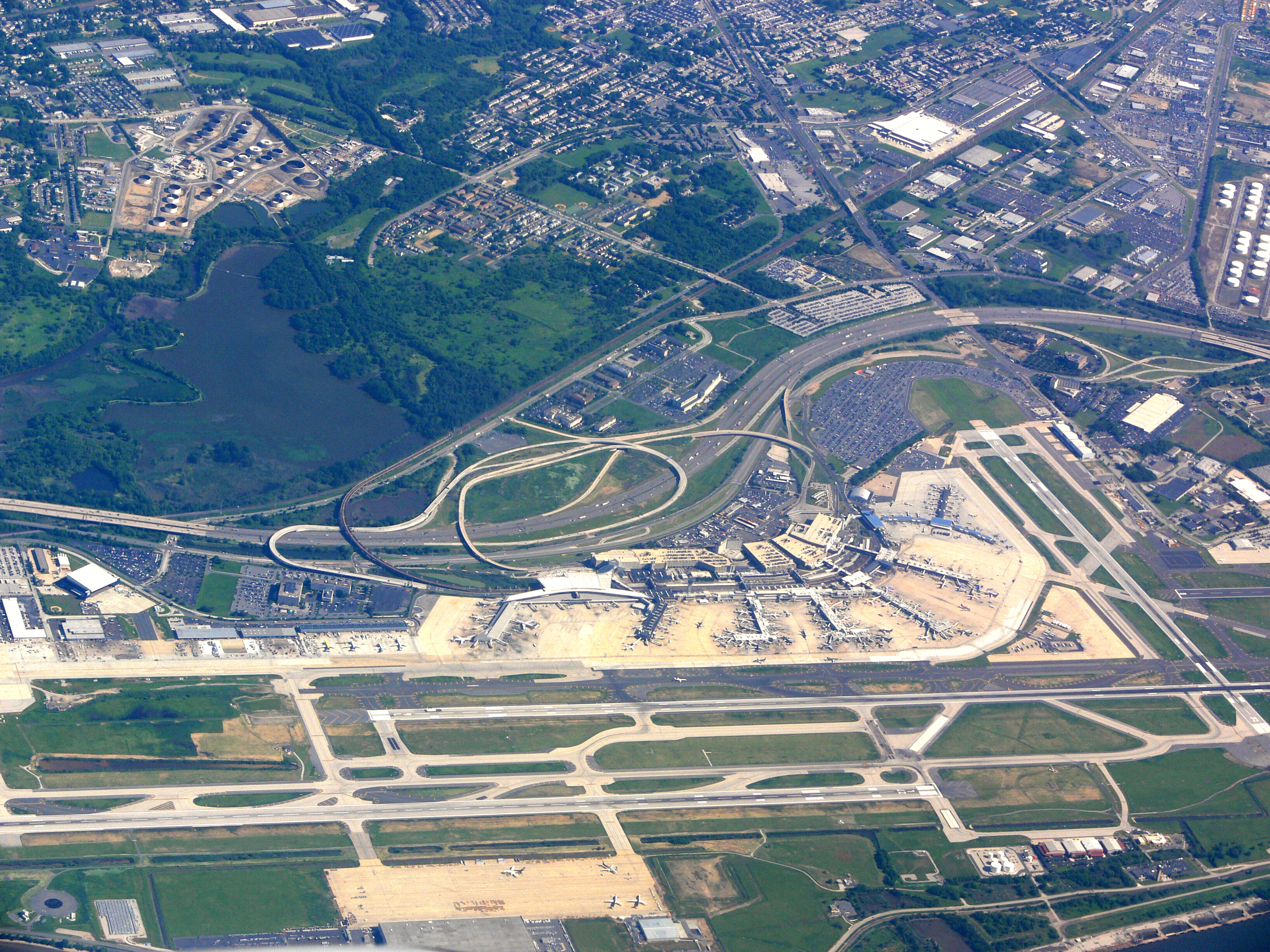
Philadelphia International Airport in Philadelphia in June 2007

The primary Interstate Highway along the East Coast is Interstate 95, completed in 2018, which replaced the historic U.S. Route 1 (Atlantic Highway), the original federal highway that traversed all East Coast states except Delaware.

By water, the East Coast is connected from the Annisquam River in Gloucester, Massachusetts to Miami, Florida, by the Intracoastal Waterway, also known as the East Coast Canal, which was completed in 1912. Amtrak's Downeaster and Northeast Regional offer the main passenger rail service on the Seaboard. The Acela Express offers the only high-speed rail passenger service in the Americas. Between New York and Boston, the Acela Express has up to a 54% share of the combined train and air passenger market.

Some of the largest airports in the United States are located along the East Coast of the United States, such as John F. Kennedy International Airport in Queens, New York City, Logan International Airport in Boston, Newark Liberty Airport in Newark, New Jersey, Philadelphia International Airport in Philadelphia, Baltimore–Washington International Airport near Baltimore, Dulles International Airport near Washington, D.C., Hartsfield–Jackson International Airport in Atlanta, Miami International Airport in Miami, Charlotte Douglas International Airport in Charlotte, North Carolina, Tampa International Airport in Tampa, and Orlando International Airport in Orlando, Florida.

== Culture ==
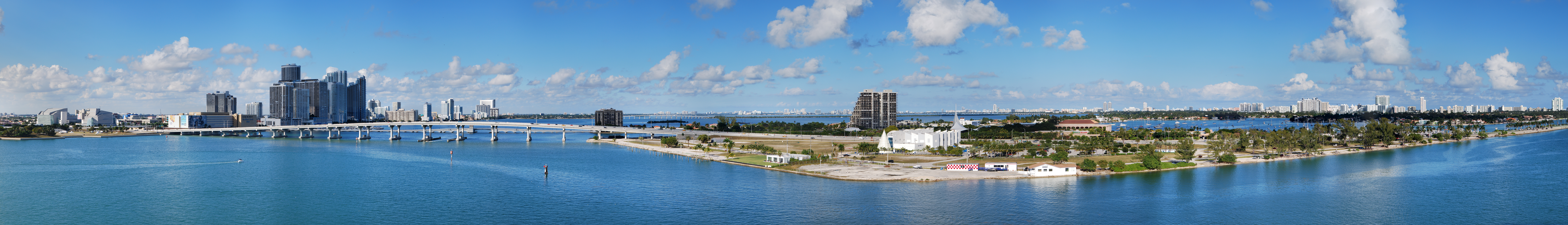
Panoramic view of Biscayne Bay from PortMiami with Downtown Miami (on left) and Miami Beach (in background on right)

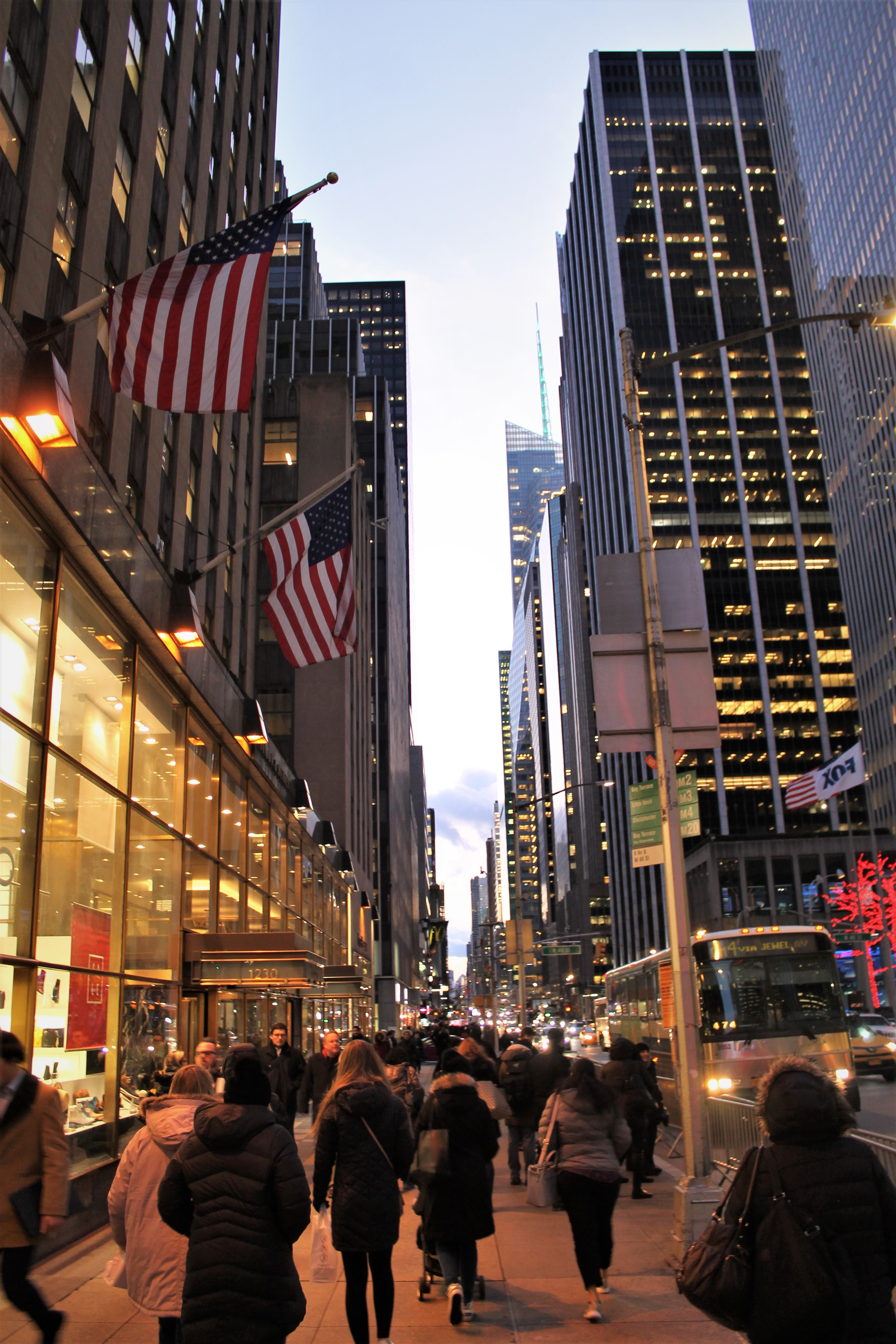
The fast-paced streets of New York City, the largest city in the United States, in January 2020

As the first spot in the United States that immigrants arrived and the close proximity of Europe, the Caribbean, and Latin America, the East Coast is home to a diverse population and home to multi-cultures when compared to the rest of the U.S. From the strong Latin culture in southern Florida, to the 200-year-old Gullah culture of the low country coastal islands of Georgia and South Carolina, to the many historic cities in the Mid-Atlantic, where strong English, German, Italian, Irish, and French culture are present, the East Coast is significantly more diverse than the rest of the United States. Numerous Chinatowns in New York City, and Little Havana in Miami, are examples of such cultural centers in the bigger cities.

The East Coast is home to much of the political and financial power and a center for resort and travel destinations in the United States. New York City is the most populous city in the country and a major world financial center. Seventy-one of the world's Fortune 500 companies have their corporate headquarters in New York City, while Midtown Manhattan, with 400 million square feet of office space in 2018, is the largest central business district in the world. Washington, D.C. is the federal capital and political nerve center of the United States. Many organizations such as defense contractors, civilian contractors, nonprofit organizations, lobbying firms, trade unions, industry trade groups and professional associations have their headquarters in or near Washington, D.C., in order to be close to the federal government.

Miami is one of the top domestic and international travel destinations in the United States. It is the warmest major city in the continental United States in winter, which contributes to it being a major tourism hub for international visitors. Miami has one of the largest concentrations of international banks in the United States, and the third-largest skyline in the U.S. with over 439 high-rises, 68 of which exceed 490 ft (150 m). The Port of Miami is the busiest cruise port in the world in both passenger traffic and cruise lines, with over 5.5 million cruise passengers passing through the port each year. The center for tropical plant culture and research in the United States is based in Miami at Fairchild Tropical Botanic Garden. The state of Florida is the second-largest producer of oranges in the world behind Brazil.

== See also ==
- Atlantic coastal plain
- Atlantic Seaboard Fall Line
- BosWash (Boston in the north to Washington, D.C. in the south)
- East Coast–West Coast hip-hop rivalry
- Gulf Coast of the United States
- Northeast megalopolis
- West Coast of the United States
