= Cedar Island (Fourth Lake) =

Island

- Location within New York

Geography
- Location: Fourth Lake
- Coordinates: 43°45′38″N 74°48′42″W
- Highest elevation: 1,713 ft (522.1 m)

Administration
- United States
- State: New York
- County: Hamilton
- Town: Inlet

Cedar Island is an island on Fourth Lake in Hamilton County, New York.

Cedar Island Hotel, 4th Lake, Adirondacks about 1905
