= List of lakes of Desha County, Arkansas =

There are at least 78 named lakes and reservoirs in Desha County, Arkansas.

== Lakes ==
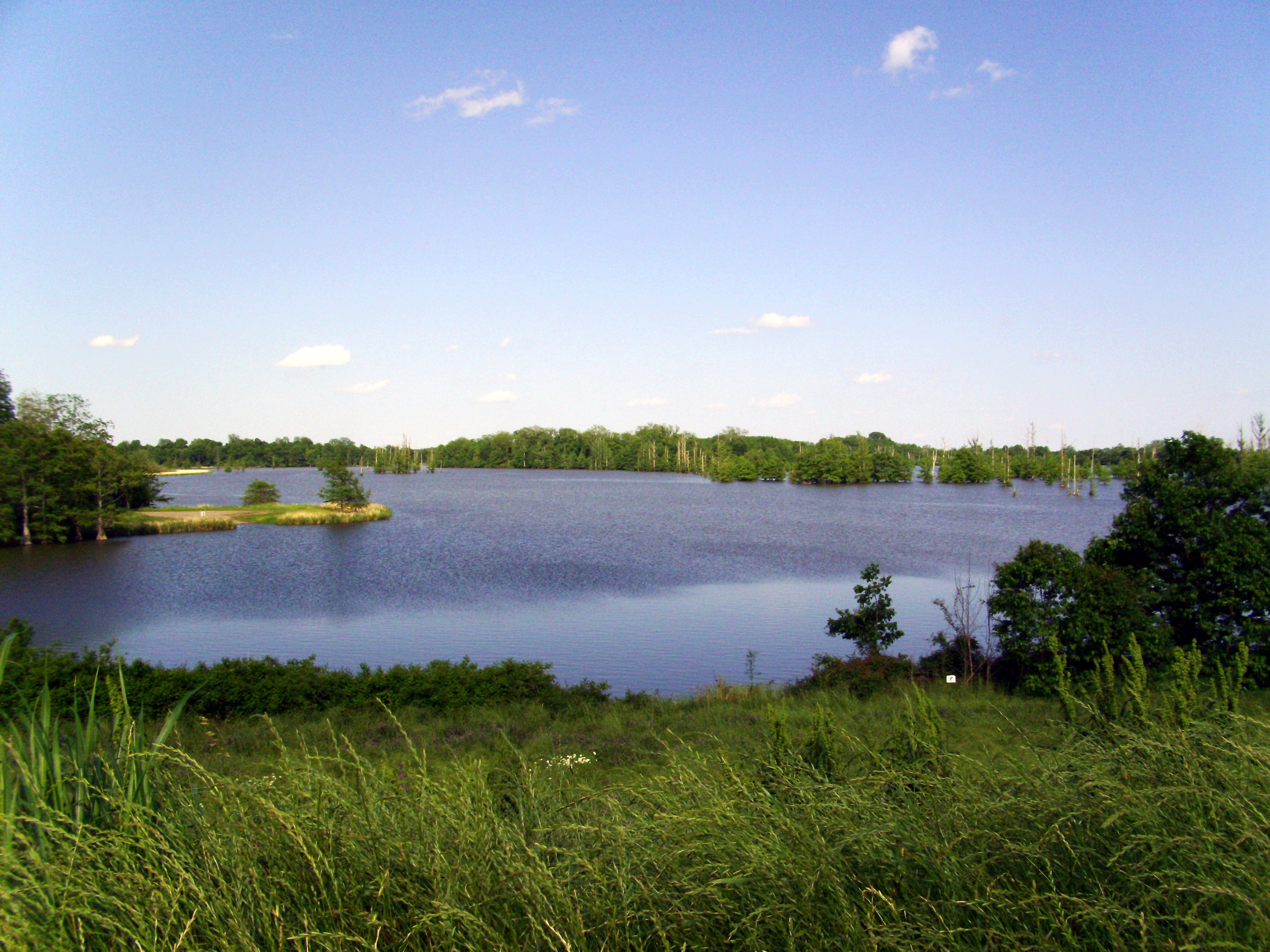
Mud Lake

- Alligator Lake, 34°02′38″N 091°06′02″W, el. 144 feet (44 m)
- Amos Bayou, 33°48′57″N 091°28′58″W, el. 154 feet (47 m)
- Austin Brake, 33°40′00″N 091°27′15″W, el. 141 feet (43 m)
- Bar Lake, 33°42′15″N 091°06′25″W, el. 128 feet (39 m)
- Bar Lake, 33°40′33″N 091°04′03″W, el. 128 feet (39 m)
- Bear Lake, 33°45′47″N 091°13′51″W, el. 141 feet (43 m)
- Bear Lake (historical), 34°04′13″N 091°03′30″W, el. 151 feet (46 m)
- Belcoe Lake, 33°56′12″N 091°18′05″W, el. 148 feet (45 m)
- Big Round Lake, 34°04′07″N 091°06′25″W, el. 144 feet (44 m)
- Billy Moore Lake, 33°52′22″N 091°06′55″W, el. 138 feet (42 m)
- Blue Hole, 33°38′03″N 091°10′33″W, el. 102 feet (31 m)
- Blue Hole, 33°59′56″N 090°58′48″W, el. 135 feet (41 m)
- Blue Hole, 33°57′03″N 091°19′46″W, el. 151 feet (46 m)
- Blue Hole, 33°44′37″N 091°09′04″W, el. 148 feet (45 m)
- Bobs Blue Hole, 33°42′56″N 091°08′15″W, el. 138 feet (42 m)
- Bobtail Lake, 33°54′52″N 091°09′32″W, el. 148 feet (45 m)
- Callie Lake, 33°49′18″N 091°08′05″W, el. 118 feet (36 m)
- Clear Lake, 33°46′30″N 091°12′01″W, el. 141 feet (43 m)
- Deep Lake, 33°45′50″N 091°10′49″W, el. 135 feet (41 m)
- Double Cabin Lake, 34°02′07″N 090°59′15″W, el. 151 feet (46 m)
- Dry Bayou, 33°46′37″N 091°26′00″W, el. 151 feet (46 m)
- Eagles Nest Lake, 33°45′51″N 091°10′14″W, el. 141 feet (43 m)
- East Moon Lake, 34°02′34″N 091°09′44″W, el. 135 feet (41 m)
- Echubby Lake, 33°59′45″N 091°25′36″W, el. 161 feet (49 m)
- Elbow Lakes, 34°05′39″N 091°07′13″W, el. 141 feet (43 m)
- Fishing Bayou Waterhole, 33°46′10″N 091°09′33″W, el. 141 feet (43 m)
- Graddy Blue Hole, 34°01′32″N 091°01′48″W, el. 141 feet (43 m)
- Grindle Hole, 33°46′21″N 091°09′24″W, el. 141 feet (43 m)
- Half Moon Lake, 34°00′06″N 091°05′43″W, el. 141 feet (43 m)
- Hog Pen Hole, 33°56′04″N 091°10′39″W, el. 135 feet (41 m)
- Hole in the Wall Lake, 34°00′32″N 091°07′48″W, el. 135 feet (41 m)
- Jefferson Lake, 33°50′59″N 091°09′04″W, el. 138 feet (42 m)
- Kate Adams Lake, 33°35′38″N 091°12′53″W, el. 118 feet (36 m)
- Lake Beulah, 33°45′59″N 091°00′29″W, el. 121 feet (37 m)
- Lake Cheatham, 33°48′41″N 091°12′04″W, el. 131 feet (40 m)
- Lake Defiance, 34°02′41″N 091°00′22″W, el. 148 feet (45 m)
- Lake Isaacs, 33°42′51″N 091°16′03″W, el. 125 feet (38 m)
- Lake Lenox, 33°58′17″N 091°22′45″W, el. 157 feet (48 m)
- Lake Lenox, 33°57′01″N 091°23′04″W, el. 154 feet (47 m)
- Lake Whittington, 33°39′30″N 091°04′47″W, el. 118 feet (36 m)
- Little Clear Lake, 33°45′09″N 091°10′40″W, el. 141 feet (43 m)
- Little Goose Lake, 34°03′08″N 091°09′50″W, el. 138 feet (42 m)
- Little Jefferson Lake, 33°51′49″N 091°09′31″W, el. 144 feet (44 m)
- Long Lake, 33°47′58″N 091°01′03″W, el. 138 feet (42 m)
- Long Lake, 34°05′31″N 091°08′34″W, el. 141 feet (43 m)
- Lower Parish Lake, 34°04′36″N 091°09′32″W, el. 138 feet (42 m)
- Lower Swan Lake, 34°03′55″N 091°03′36″W, el. 144 feet (44 m)
- Lower Taylor Lake, 34°07′28″N 091°04′31″W, el. 144 feet (44 m)
- Minnie Anderson Old River, 33°54′04″N 091°09′48″W, el. 138 feet (42 m)
- Mixture Lake, 33°59′58″N 091°07′59″W, el. 138 feet (42 m)
- Moon Lake, 34°04′20″N 091°07′24″W, el. 144 feet (44 m)
- Mossy Lake, 34°04′53″N 091°09′08″W, el. 138 feet (42 m)
- Mound Lake, 33°54′03″N 091°13′37″W, el. 151 feet (46 m)
- Mud Lake, 33°58′40″N 091°24′46″W, el. 161 feet (49 m)
- Old River Lake, 33°57′37″N 090°58′42″W, el. 138 feet (42 m)
- Oxbow Lake, 34°06′01″N 091°07′34″W, el. 144 feet (44 m)
- Oxbow Lake, 34°05′57″N 091°08′13″W, el. 141 feet (43 m)
- Ozark Lake, 33°46′59″N 091°07′35″W, el. 131 feet (40 m)
- Paradise Bayou, 34°00′43″N 091°08′42″W, el. 141 feet (43 m)
- Parish Lake, 34°05′08″N 091°09′47″W, el. 138 feet (42 m)
- Pelican Lake (Arkansas), 33°50′40″N 091°06′51″W, el. 138 feet (42 m)
- Pothole Lake, 33°35′07″N 091°13′17″W, el. 118 feet (36 m)
- Prairie Lakes, 34°05′14″N 091°05′38″W, el. 144 feet (44 m)
- Prices Lake, 33°49′05″N 091°05′52″W, el. 138 feet (42 m)
- Red Fork Lake, 33°56′38″N 091°16′42″W, el. 157 feet (48 m)
- Silver Lake, 33°58′06″N 091°25′39″W, el. 157 feet (48 m)
- Smith Lake, 33°53′17″N 091°09′44″W, el. 138 feet (42 m)
- Swan Lake, 34°04′45″N 091°00′16″W, el. 141 feet (43 m)
- Swan Lake, 34°01′51″N 091°09′35″W, el. 138 feet (42 m)
- Swan Lake, 33°45′41″N 091°10′27″W, el. 141 feet (43 m)
- Swan Lake, 34°04′26″N 090°58′01″W, el. 138 feet (42 m)
- Timber Lake, 33°51′51″N 091°05′45″W, el. 138 feet (42 m)
- Upper Old River Lake, 33°59′45″N 090°58′36″W, el. 138 feet (42 m)
- Walnut Lake, 33°51′30″N 091°29′54″W, el. 154 feet (47 m)
- Webfoot Lake, 33°56′43″N 091°08′02″W, el. 128 feet (39 m)
- Whisky Lake, 34°02′39″N 091°10′14″W, el. 141 feet (43 m)
- Whitehill Lake, 33°37′42″N 091°11′22″W, el. 128 feet (39 m)

== Reservoir ==
- Frenchie Lake, 33°36′14″N 091°17′37″W, el. 128 feet (39 m)

== See also ==
- List of lakes in Arkansas
