= Bug Lake (New York) =

- Location within New York Location within the United States
- Location: Hamilton County, New York, United States
- Coordinates: 43°46′08″N 74°43′47″W
- Type: Lake
- Basin countries: United States
- Surface area: 80 acres (0.32 km^{2})
- Average depth: 15 feet (4.6 m)
- Max. depth: 61 feet (19 m)
- Shore length^{1}: 2.3 miles (3.7 km)
- Surface elevation: 2,014 feet (614 m)
- Islands: 1
- Settlements: Inlet, New York
- ^{1} Shore length is not a well-defined measure.

Bug Lake is located east of Inlet, New York. The outlet creek flows into Seventh Lake. Fish species present in the lake are lake trout, kokanee salmon, brown trout, brook trout, and rainbow smelt. There is carry down access off trail on the southwest shore. All hikers must register at Eighth Lake Campground.
