= Inlet (hamlet), New York =

Inlet, New York
- Hamlet
- Location within New York Location within the United States
- Coordinates: 43°45′16″N 74°47′35″W
- Country: United States
- State: New York
- County: Hamilton
- Town: Inlet
- Elevation: 1,749 ft (533 m)
- Time zone: UTC-5 (Eastern (EST))
  - Summer (DST): UTC-4 (EDT)
- ZIP code: 13360
- Area code: 518

Inlet is a hamlet located in the Town of Inlet in Hamilton County, New York, United States. It is situated at the eastern end of the Fourth Lake and in the valley connecting the Fourth, Fifth and Sixth Lakes of the Fulton Chain of Lakes.
