= Goff Island =

Island in New York, United States

- Location within New York

Geography
- Location: Seventh Lake
- Coordinates: 43°44′29″N 74°44′22″W
- Area: 15 acres (6.1 ha)
- Highest elevation: 1,795 ft (547.1 m)

Administration
- United States
- State: New York
- County: Hamilton
- Town: Inlet

Goff Island is an island on Seventh Lake in Hamilton County, New York. It is named after brothers Frederick Harris Goff (banker, who established the Cleveland Foundation) and Isaac Channing Goff (industrialist), who built vacation camps on the island circa 1900.
