= Third Lake (Herkimer County, New York) =

Lake in Herkimer County, New York, United States

- Location in New York Third Lake (the United States)
- Location: Herkimer County, New York
- Coordinates: 43°43′48″N 74°53′56″W
- Primary inflows: Fourth Lake, Third Lake Creek
- Primary outflows: Second Lake
- Basin countries: United States
- Surface elevation: 1,706 feet (520 m)
- Settlements: Old Forge, New York

Third Lake is located in the Town of Webb in Herkimer County, New York, by the hamlet of Old Forge. Third Lake is part of the Fulton Chain of Lakes.
