= Bartons Island =

- Location within New York

Geography
- Location: Fourth Lake
- Coordinates: 43°45′18″N 74°52′03″W
- Highest elevation: 1,706 ft (520 m)

Administration
- United States
- State: New York
- County: Herkimer
- Town: Webb

Bartons Island is an island on Fourth Lake in Herkimer County, New York.
