= Brown Tract Pond Campground =

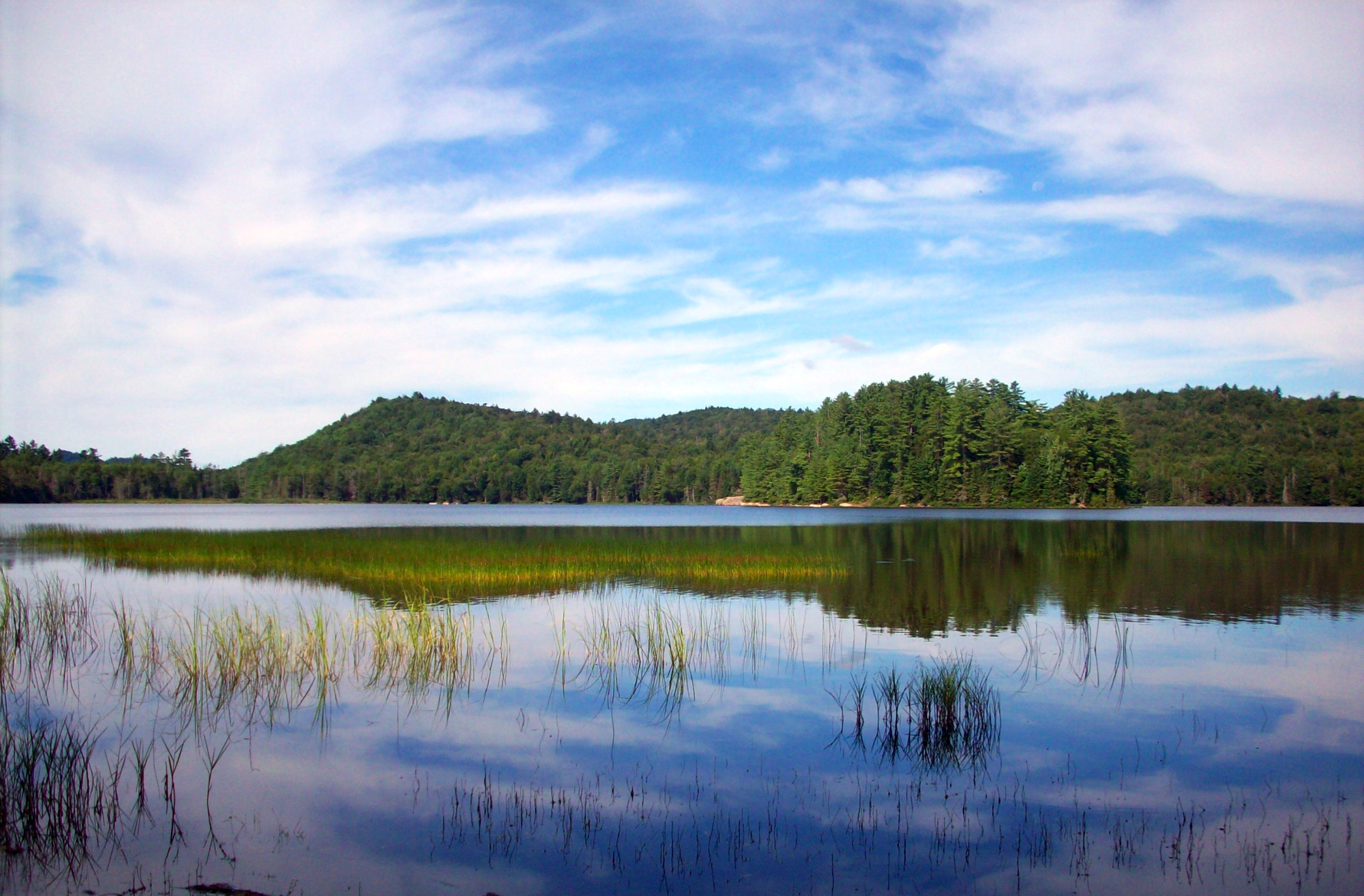
- Browns Tract Pond from the campground

- Location within New York
- Location: Uncas Road, Raquette Lake, New York
- Coordinates: 43°48′13″N 74°42′14″W
- Area: 146 acres (59 ha)
- Created: 1957
- Operator: New York State Department of Environmental Conservation
- Camp sites: 90

Brown Tract Pond Campground is a campground run by the New York State Department of Environmental Conservation in Raquette Lake, New York. It is located on the shores of Browns Tract Pond in a remote area of the Adirondacks, approximately two miles (3.2 km) from Raquette Lake, near the town of Inlet in Hamilton County.

Brown Tract Pond State Campground consists of a 146-acre (59 ha) site including ninety camping sites, eight of which are remote. Recreational activities available at the campground include canoeing, fishing, swimming, hiking, and bicycling.

== History ==
Development of the campground began in 1957 and was completed in 1958.

In 2010, the campground was in the news when a bear who had been threatening the campers had to be shot by a forest ranger.

In 2015, Brown Tract was the site of a boat washing station run by the Department of Environmental Conservation to limit the spread of invasive species.

== Description ==
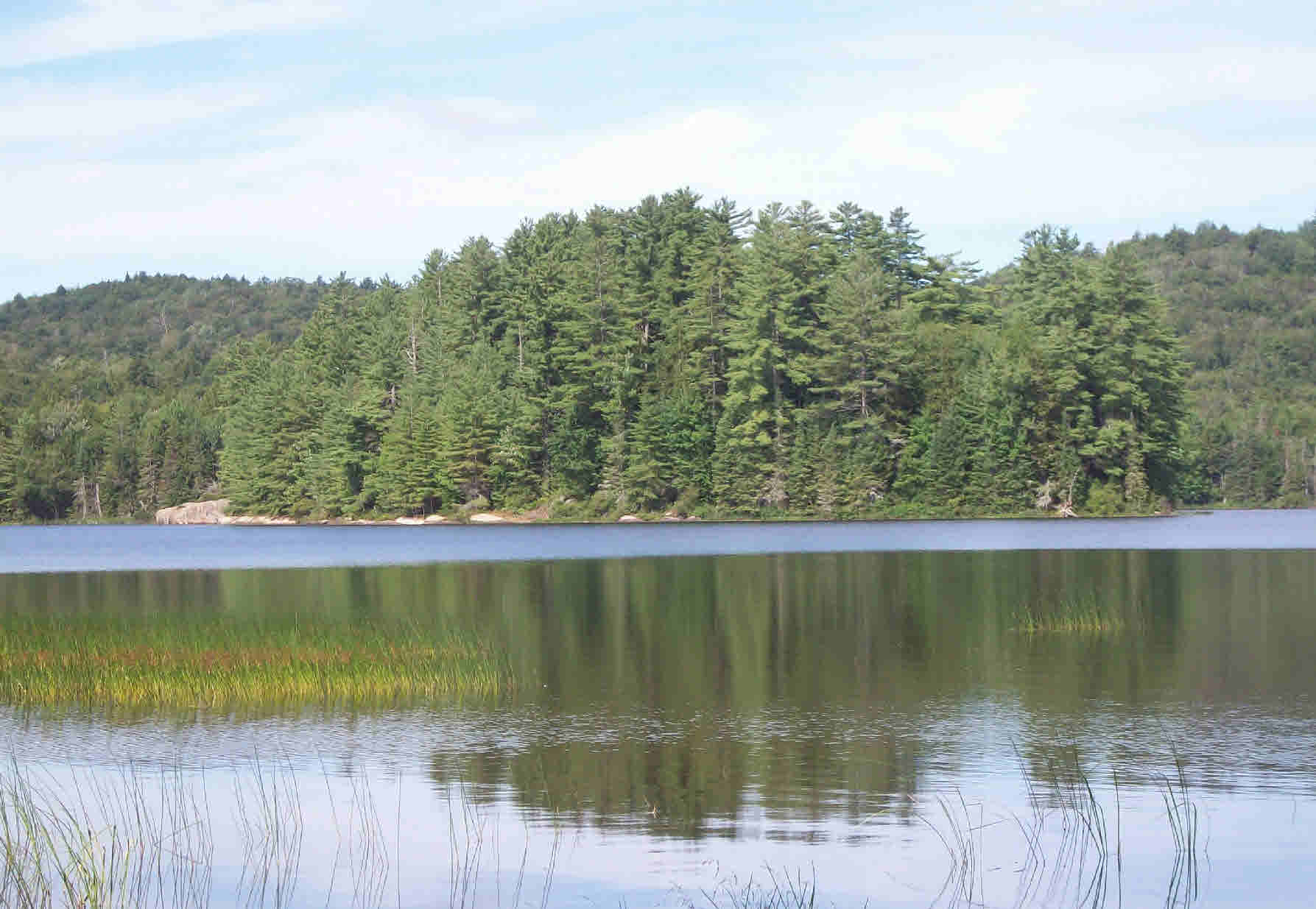
The island near the west side of Brown Tract Pond.

Brown Tract Campground has 90 tent and trailer sites, a picnic area with tables and fireplaces, flush toilets, a trailer dump station, and a recycling center.

Browns Tract Pond is approximately 0.5 miles (0.80 km) across with a small island near the west side. The island is uninhabited, however on the south side there are several large boulders, one of which has a wooden ladder to allow visitors to climb up and jump off into the pond.

Motor boats are not allowed on the pond. Rowboats and canoes are permitted, and rentals are available from the camp office. There is a boat launch with limited parking. Fish varieties in the pond include smallmouth bass, largemouth bass, sunfish, yellow perch, brown bullhead, sucker common shiner, golden shiner, and occasionally brook trout.

There are nearby trails to Black Bear Mountain, Bug Lake, Eagle Lake, and Eighth Lake. Marked trails lead to Shallow Lake and West Mountain. A large wooded picnic area is available as is a sand beach.

=== Area attractions ===
Campers can visit the Old Forge region, Adirondack Museum, and golf courses at Inlet and Indian Lake.
