= Sixth Lake =

- Location within New York Sixth Lake (the United States)
- Location: Hamilton County, New York
- Coordinates: 43°44′57″N 74°46′24″W
- Type: Lake
- Primary inflows: Seventh Lake
- Primary outflows: Fifth Lake
- Basin countries: United States
- Surface area: 108 acres (0.44 km^{2})
- Average depth: 12 feet (3.7 m)
- Max. depth: 38 feet (12 m)
- Shore length^{1}: 3.8 miles (6.1 km)
- Surface elevation: 1,785 feet (544 m)
- Islands: 4
- Settlements: Inlet, New York
- ^{1} Shore length is not a well-defined measure.

Sixth Lake is located near Inlet, New York. It is part of the Fulton Chain Lakes. The inlet is connected to Seventh Lake by a channel and the outlet is connected to Fifth Lake by a creek. Fish species present in the lake are brown trout, lake whitefish, lake trout, smelt, splake, rainbow trout, white sucker, black bullhead, yellow perch, and pumpkinseed sunfish. There is access via a channel from Seventh Lake.
