= The Shelter =

The Shelter may refer to:

- The Shelter, a website dedicated to Francis Schaeffer
- The Shelter (The Twilight Zone), a 1961 episode of the television series The Twilight Zone
- "The Shelter", an episode of the television series Lawman
- The Shelter (New York City), a famed Manhattan dance club
- The Shelter (Detroit, Michigan), a notable music venue in metro Detroit, Michigan
- The Shelter (album), a 2010 album by Jars of Clay

== See also ==
- Shelter (disambiguation)
