= Second Lake (New York) =

Lake in New York, USA

- Location within New York Second Lake (the United States)
- Location: Herkimer County, New York
- Coordinates: 43°43′16″N 74°54′40″W
- Primary inflows: Third Lake
- Primary outflows: First Lake
- Basin countries: United States
- Surface elevation: 1,706 feet (520 m)
- Settlements: Old Forge, New York

Second Lake is located in the Town of Webb in Herkimer County, New York, by the hamlet of Old Forge. Second Lake is part of the Fulton Chain of Lakes.
