= Fifth Lake =

Lake in New York

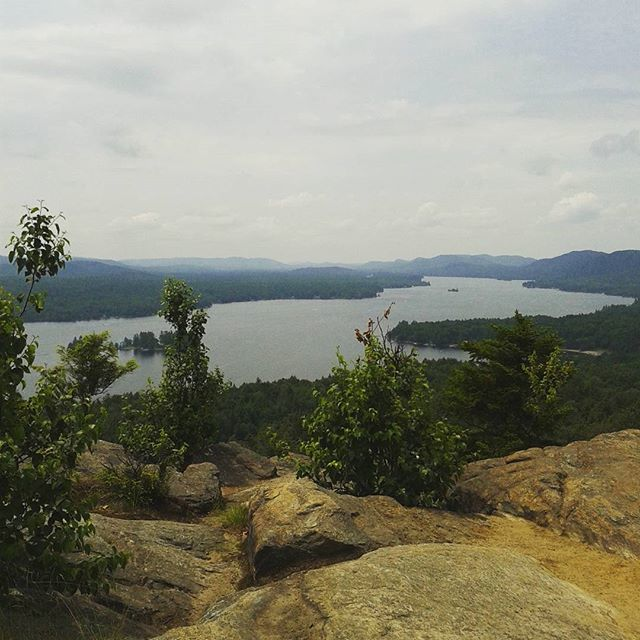
- View of Fourth Lake from Rocky Mountain in 2015

- Location within New York Fifth Lake (the United States)
- Location: Hamilton County, New York
- Coordinates: 43°44′53″N 74°47′31″W
- Type: Lake
- Primary inflows: Sixth Lake
- Primary outflows: Fourth Lake
- Basin countries: United States
- Surface area: 13 acres (0.053 km^{2})
- Average depth: 5 feet (1.5 m)
- Max. depth: 20 feet (6.1 m)
- Shore length^{1}: .6 miles (0.97 km)
- Surface elevation: 1,706 feet (520 m)
- Settlements: Inlet, New York
- ^{1} Shore length is not a well-defined measure.

Fifth Lake is located near Inlet, New York. It is part of the Fulton Chain Lakes. The inlet is connected to Sixth Lake by a creek and the outlet is connected to Fourth Lake by a channel. Fish species present in the lake are brown trout, lake trout, smelt, rainbow trout, black bullhead, yellow perch, and pumpkinseed sunfish. There is access via a channel from Fourth Lake.
