= Fourth Lake (New York) =

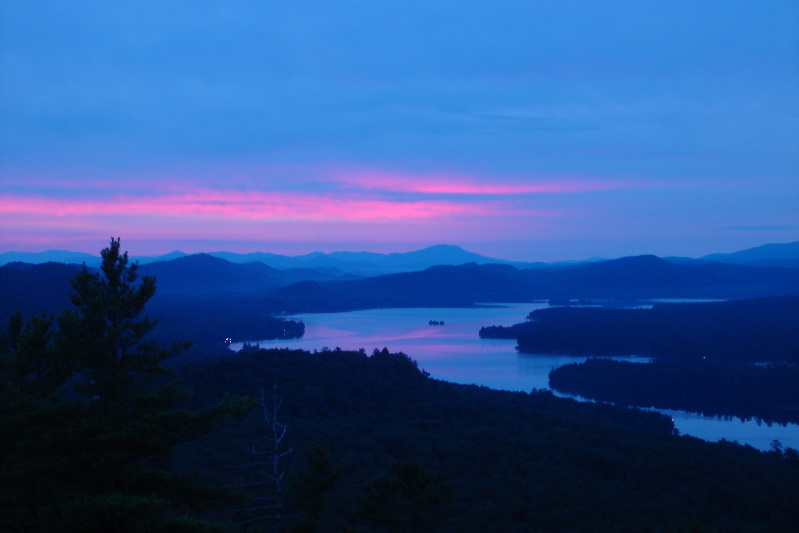
- View of Fourth Lake from Bald Mountain

- Location within New York Fourth Lake (the United States)
- Location: Herkimer County, Hamilton County, New York
- Coordinates: 43°44′57″N 74°52′23″W, 43°44′32″N 74°53′00″W, 43°45′03″N 74°52′36″W, 43°45′22″N 74°49′19″W
- Type: Lake
- Primary inflows: Fifth Lake
- Primary outflows: Third Lake
- Basin countries: United States
- Surface area: 2,138 acres (8.65 km^{2})
- Average depth: 34 feet (10 m)
- Max. depth: 94 feet (29 m)
- Shore length^{1}: 9.8 miles (15.8 km)
- Surface elevation: 1,706 feet (520 m)
- Islands: 9
- Settlements: Eagle Bay and Inlet, New York
- ^{1} Shore length is not a well-defined measure.

Fourth Lake is located near Eagle Bay, New York and Inlet, New York. Fourth Lake is part of the Fulton Chain Lakes. Fish species present in the lake are lake trout, atlantic salmon, landlocked salmon, white sucker, brook trout, rainbow trout, yellow perch, and brown trout. Hard surface ramp on Route 28, 10 miles east of Old Forge and there is a hand launch access on South Shore Road.

== Tributaries and locations ==
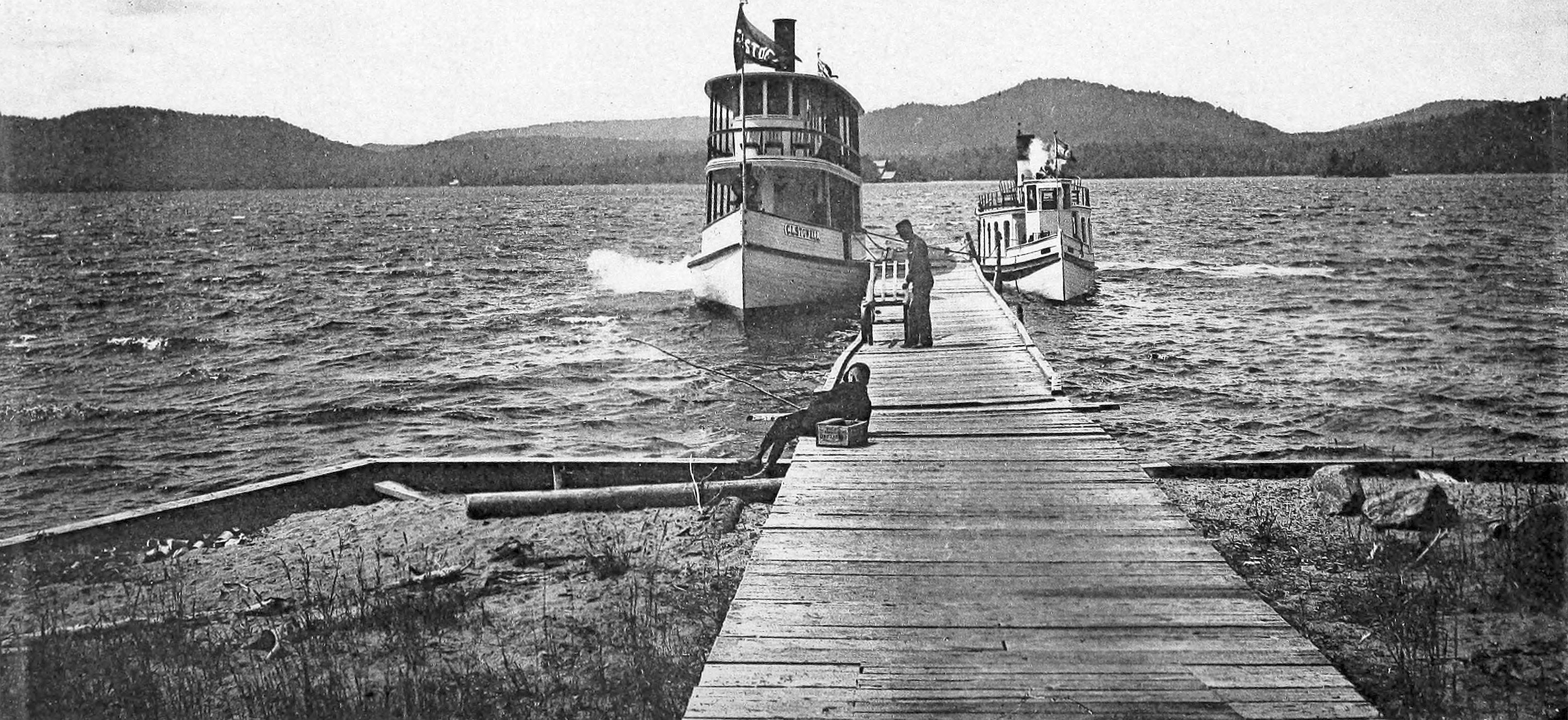
Fourth Lake, 1894

- Alger Island – Also called Big Island, it is the largest island on the lake. There is a campground on Alger Island.
- Bartons Island – An island located on the north shore of the lake, northwest of Alger Island.
- Cedar Island – An island located southeast of Eagle Point.
- Dollar Island – An island located east of Cedar Island.
- Eagle Bay – A hamlet located on the northeast shore of the lake.
- Eagle Point – A point of the lake located south of Eagle Bay on the north shore.
- Gulf Rock Point – A point of the lake located on the south shore, south of Eagle Bay.
- Quiver Pond – A pond located south of Fourth Lake. The outlet creek flows into Fourth Lake.
- Rock Point – A point of the lake located on the east end of the lake near the boat launch.
- Shelter Island – An island located on the south shore, south of Alger Island. Shelter Island is connected to shore by a man made foot bridge.
- Surprise Pond – A small pond located north of Fourth Lake and west of Eagle Bay.
- Thistle Island – An island located west of Barton's Island. Thistle Island is connected to shore by a man-made foot bridge.
