= Shelter Island =

Shelter Island may refer to:

== Places ==
- Shelter Island (Alaska), an island in the Alexander Archipelago, Alaska
- Shelter Island, Montana, an island in Flathead Lake, Montana
- Shelter Island (Hong Kong), an island in Port Shelter, Hong Kong
- Shelter Island (Western Australia), an island in Western Australia
- Shelter Island, New York, a town in Suffolk County, New York
  - Shelter Island (CDP), New York, a hamlet and census-designated place in the above town
  - Shelter Island Heights, New York, a hamlet and census-designated place in the above town
- Shelter Island Sound, a sound in Suffolk County, New York, surrounding Shelter Island
- Shelter Island (Fourth Lake), an island in Herkimer County, New York
- Shelter Island, San Diego, a neighbourhood of Point Loma in San Diego, California
- Shelter Island meteorite, Mars

== Other ==
- "Shelter Island" (How I Met Your Mother), a 2008 TV episode
- Shelter Island, a 2003 American film starring Ally Sheedy.
- Shelter Island Conference, a 1947 conference in Shelter Island, New York, concerning quantum mechanics
- Shelter Island Sound (recording studio), a recording studio founded by Steve Addabbo in New York City
