= Thistle Island (New York) =

Island in Herkimer County, New York, United States

- Location within New York

Geography
- Location: Fourth Lake
- Coordinates: 43°45′14″N 74°52′11″W
- Highest elevation: 1,713 ft (522.1 m)

Administration
- United States
- State: New York
- County: Herkimer
- Town: Webb

Thistle Island is an island on Fourth Lake in Herkimer County, New York. It is located east-northeast of Old Forge.
