= Cascade Lake (New York) =

- Location within New York Cascade Lake (the United States)
- Location: Hamilton County, New York, United States
- Coordinates: 43°47′28″N 74°48′10″W
- Type: Lake
- Basin countries: United States
- Surface area: 99 acres (0.40 km^{2})
- Average depth: 12 feet (3.7 m)
- Max. depth: 21 feet (6.4 m)
- Shore length^{1}: 2.5 miles (4.0 km)
- Surface elevation: 1,824 feet (556 m)
- Settlements: Inlet, New York
- ^{1} Shore length is not a well-defined measure.

Cascade Lake is a lake located north of Inlet, New York. Fish species present in the lake are black bullhead, brook trout, white sucker and yellow perch. There is carry down access on the north shore off a trail from Big Moose Road. No motors are allowed on this lake.

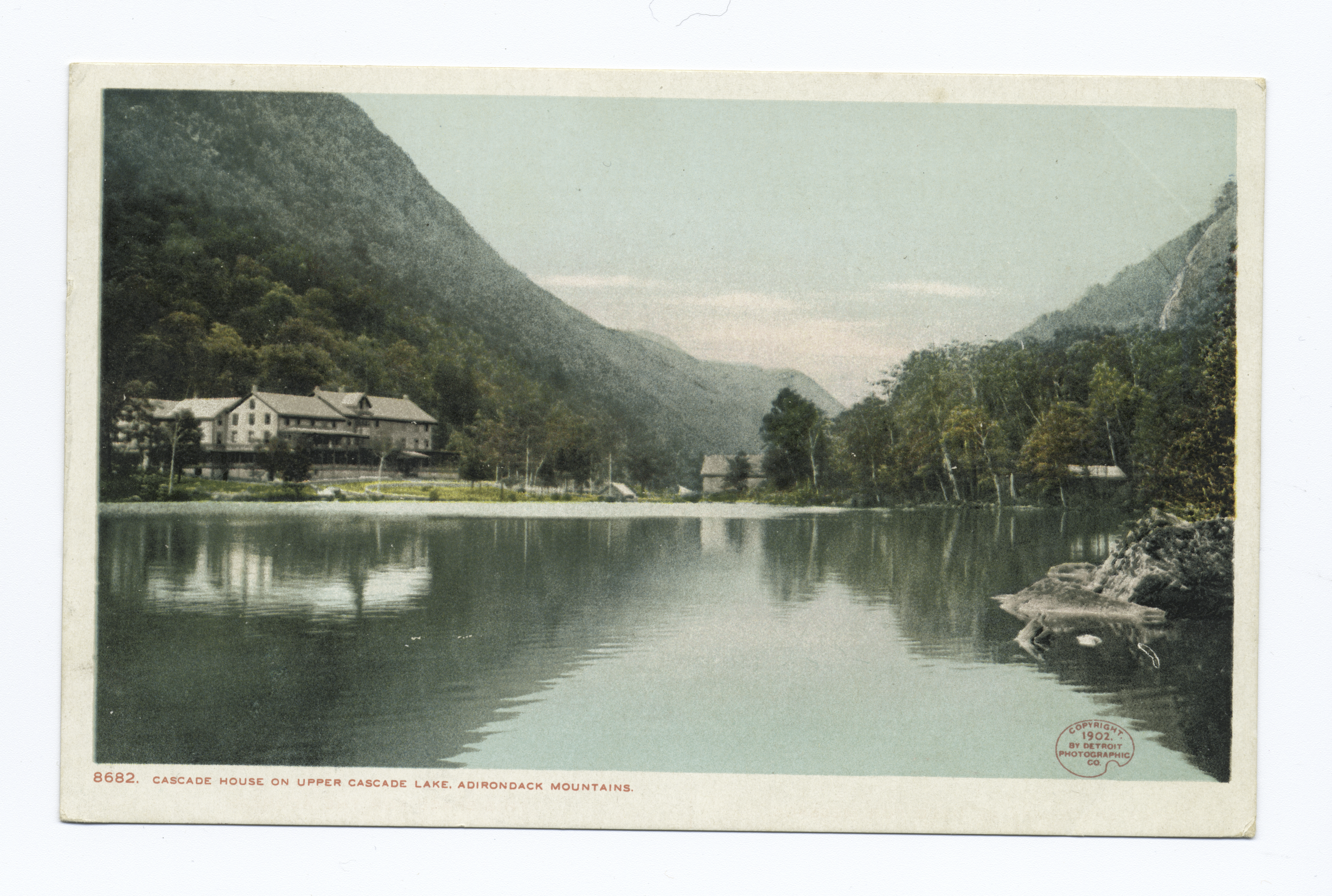
1902 postcard
