= Eagles Nest Lake =

- Location within New York Eagles Nest Lake (the United States)
- Location: Hamilton County, New York, United States
- Coordinates: 43°45′55″N 74°43′36″W
- Type: Lake
- Basin countries: United States
- Surface area: 12 acres (0.049 km^{2})
- Average depth: 21 feet (6.4 m)
- Max. depth: 55 feet (17 m)
- Shore length^{1}: .6 miles (0.97 km)
- Surface elevation: 1,923 feet (586 m)
- Settlements: Inlet, New York
- ^{1} Shore length is not a well-defined measure.

Eagles Nest Lake is located east of Inlet, New York. The outlet creek flows into Seventh Lake. Fish species present in the lake are brook trout, and lake trout. There is access by trail from Eighth Lake Campground.
