= Eighth Lake =

- Location within New York Eighth Lake (the United States)
- Location: Hamilton County, New York
- Coordinates: 43°46′45″N 74°42′08″W
- Type: Lake
- Primary outflows: Seventh Lake
- Basin countries: United States
- Surface area: 314 acres (1.27 km^{2})
- Average depth: 39 feet (12 m)
- Max. depth: 81 feet (25 m)
- Shore length^{1}: 4 miles (6.4 km)
- Surface elevation: 1,788 feet (545 m)
- Islands: 1
- Settlements: Inlet, New York
- ^{1} Shore length is not a well-defined measure.

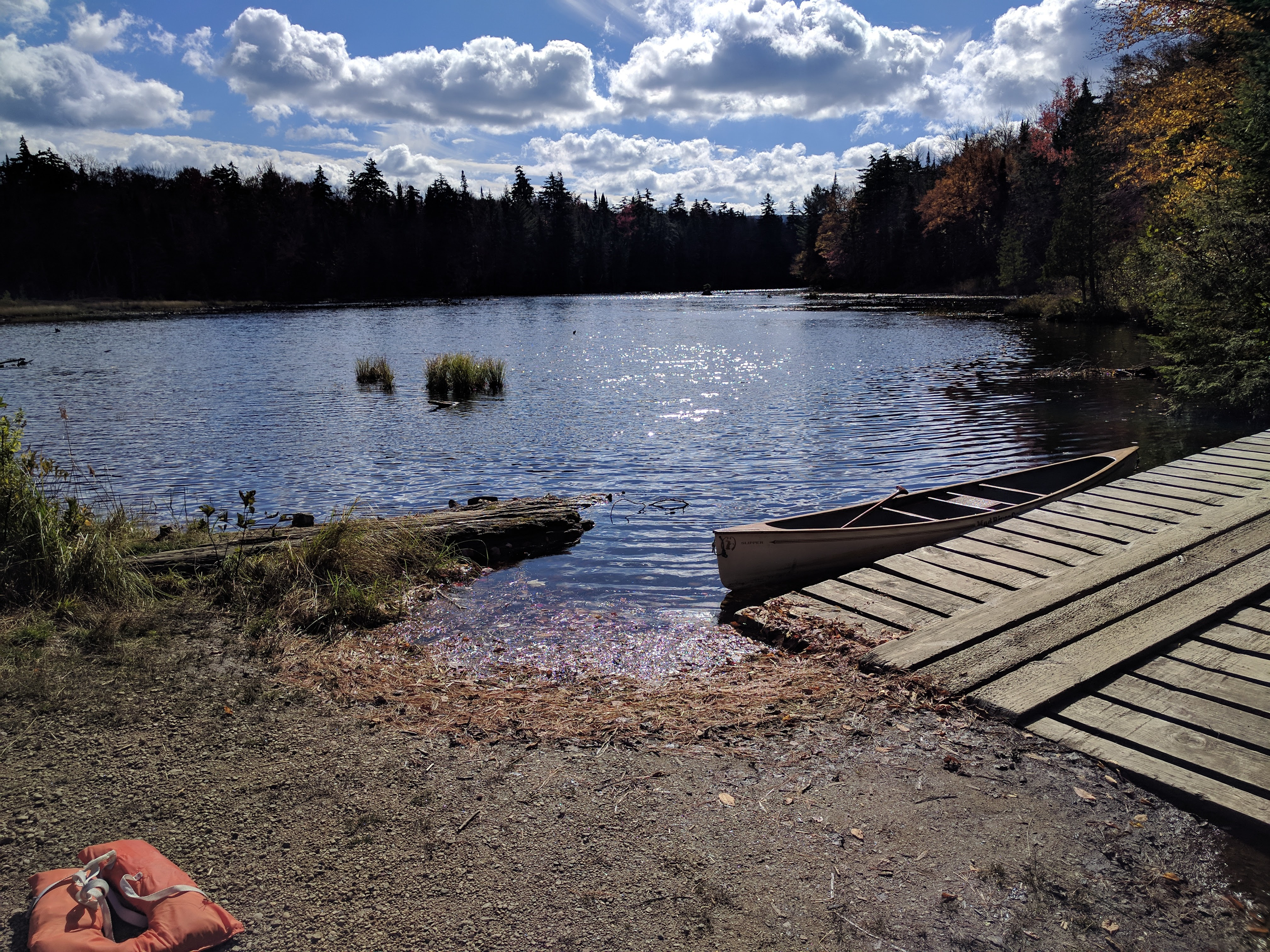
Boat access at 8th Lake Campground

Eighth Lake is located near Inlet, New York. It is part of the Fulton Chain Lakes. The outlet is connected to Seventh Lake by a creek. Fish species present in the lake are brown trout, lake trout, lake whitefish, smelt, rainbow trout, black bullhead, landlocked salmon, and pumpkinseed sunfish. There is a state owned fee hard surface ramp at Eighth Lake Campground on NY-28.
