= Limekiln Lake =

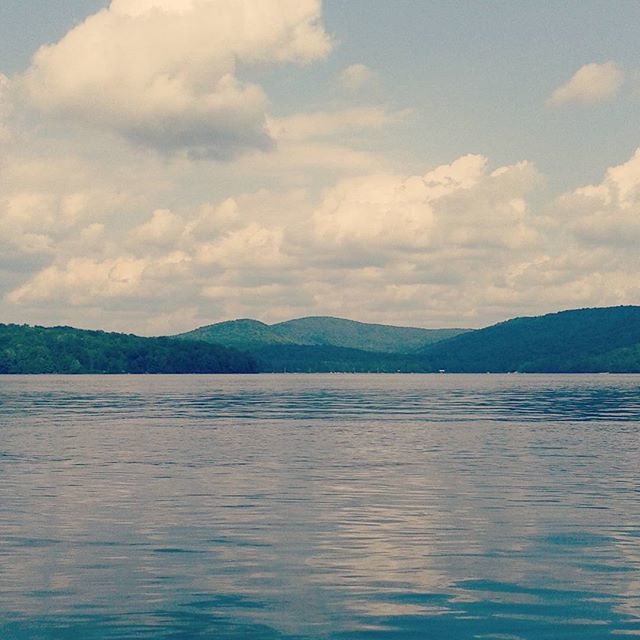
- Limekiln Lake in 2015

- Location within New York Limekiln Lake (the United States)
- Location: Hamilton County, Herkimer County, New York, United States
- Coordinates: 43°42′45″N 74°47′58″W
- Type: Lake
- Primary outflows: Limekiln Creek
- Basin countries: United States
- Surface area: 464 acres (1.88 km^{2})
- Average depth: 20 feet (6.1 m)
- Max. depth: 72 feet (22 m)
- Shore length^{1}: 6.7 miles (10.8 km)
- Surface elevation: 1,886 feet (575 m)
- Islands: 3
- Settlements: Inlet, New York
- ^{1} Shore length is not a well-defined measure.

Limekiln Lake is located south of Inlet, New York. Fish species present in the lake are brown trout, rock bass, splake, rainbow smelt, white sucker, bluegill, black bullhead, yellow perch, and sunfish. There is a state owned hard surface ramp off NY-28 on the north shore, located 3 miles southeast of inlet. Power-boats are allowed on this lake.
