= Shelter (2012 film) =

- Directed by: Adam Caudill and Wrion Bowling
- Written by: Adam Caudill and Wrion Bowling
- Produced by: Adam Caudill and Wrion Bowling
- Starring: Joyce Hsheih and Michael Lane
- Cinematography: Chad Kean and Jinwei Zeng
- Music by: Noam Arhem Levy
- Production company: Afflicted Pictures
- Release date: 2012
- Running time: 97 minutes
- Country: United States
- Language: English

Shelter is a 2012 American film directed, produced, and written by Adam Caudill and Wrion Bowling. It was shot as a passion project for under $100,000. It has been featured at a number of festivals including the 2013 Eerie Horror Film Festival where it won Best Director, and the 2012 Williamsburg Independent Film Festival where it won Best Narrative Feature Film.

== Plot ==
An ominous disaster forces five survivors to wait out nuclear winter in a secret underground bomb shelter. With limited supplies and nowhere else to go, they struggle against the clock, uncertain if they'll survive until it's safe to return to the surface. As weeks turn into months, one room proves too small for five people. Habits curdle into routine, relationships dissolve, obsessions give way to madness.

== Cast ==
- Joyce Hshieh as Chelsea
- Michael Lane as Hudson
- Sarah Street as Marisa
- Jeffrey Green as Jeff
- Carlos Garcia as Tyler

== Production ==
Shot independently for under $100,000 in Akron, Ohio the writing and directing team of Adam Caudill and Wrion Bowling cast the film and hired a support crew.

== Reception ==
The reception has been generally positive. The film has been featured at a number of festivals including the 2013 Eerie Horror Film Festival where it won Best Director, and the 2012 Williamsburg Independent Film Festival where it won Best Narrative Feature Film.
