= Lower Browns Tract Pond =

- Location within New York Location within the United States
- Location: Hamilton County, New York
- Coordinates: 43°48′31″N 74°42′05″W
- Type: Lake
- Basin countries: United States
- Surface area: 156 acres (0.63 km^{2})
- Average depth: 14 ft (4.3 m)
- Max. depth: 33 ft (10 m)
- Shore length^{1}: 1.9 mi (3.1 km)
- Surface elevation: 1,766 ft (538 m)
- Islands: 1
- Settlements: Inlet, New York
- ^{1} Shore length is not a well-defined measure.

Lower Browns Tract Pond is located northeast of Inlet, New York. Fish species present in the lake are largemouth bass, smallmouth bass, brook trout, black bullhead, yellow perch, and sunfish. There is a state owned carry down in the campground off Browns Tract Road, 7 miles east of Eagle Bay. No motors are allowed on this lake.
