= Shelter Bay =

Shelter Bay may refer to:

- Shelter Bay, British Columbia, a ferry terminal on Upper Arrow Lake, British Columbia
- Shelter Bay, Quebec
- Shelter Bay, Washington, a small community near La Conner, Washington
- Shelter Bay (ship, 1922) -- a freighter operated by the Quebec & Ontario Transportation Company
