= Shelter Island (Fourth Lake) =

- Location within New York

Geography
- Location: Fourth Lake
- Coordinates: 43°44′23″N 74°52′48″W
- Highest elevation: 1,706 ft (520 m)

Administration
- United States
- State: New York
- County: Herkimer
- Town: Webb

Shelter Island is an island on Fourth Lake in Herkimer County, New York. It is located east-northeast of Old Forge.
