= Shelter Cove =

Shelter Cove may refer to:

- Shelter Cove (Antarctica)
- Shelter Cove, California, in Humboldt County, U.S.
  - Shelter Cove Airport
- Shelter Cove, Pacifica, California, in San Mateo County, U.S.
