= Seventh Lake =

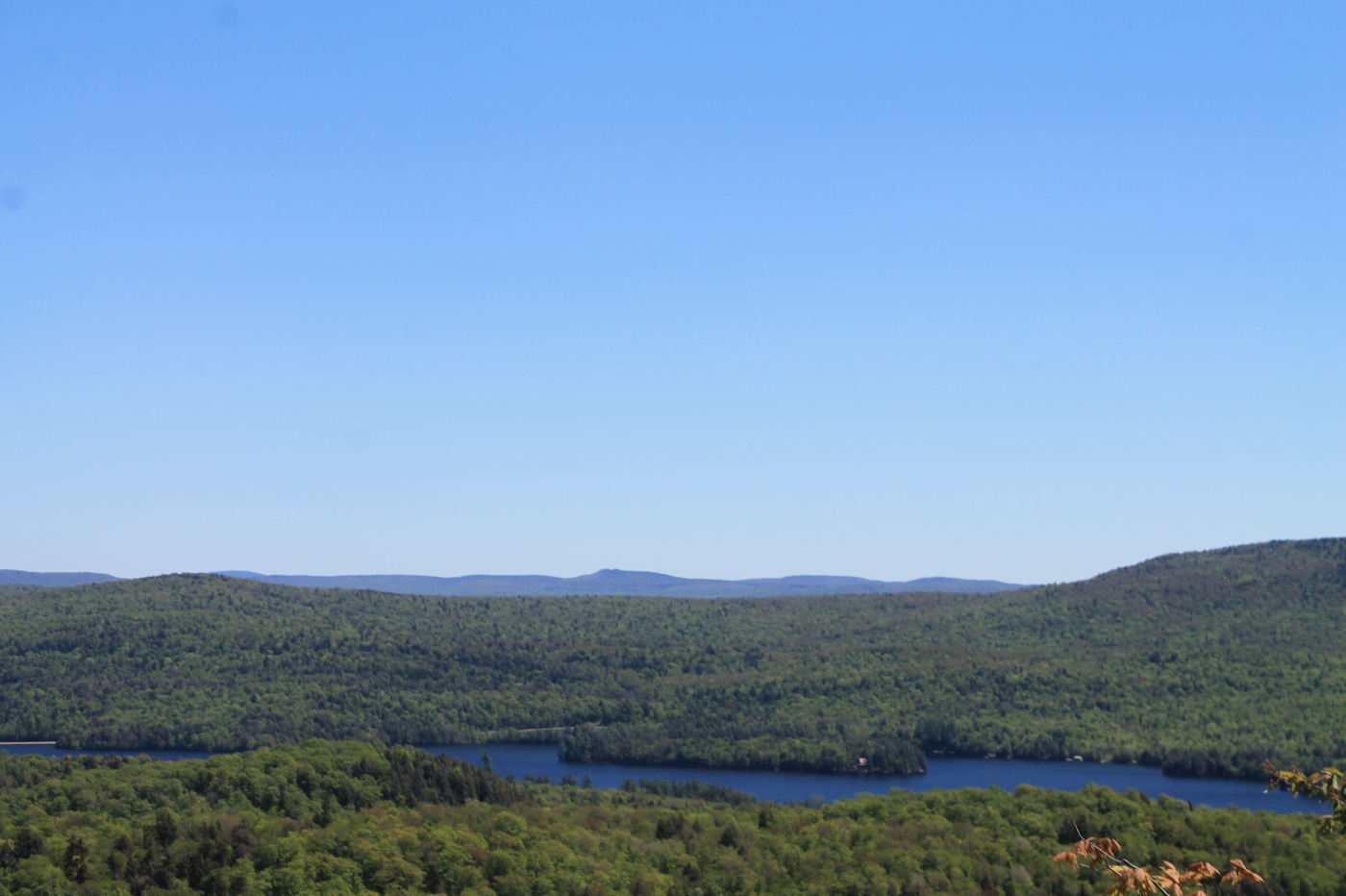
- Seventh Lake from Black Bear Mountain in May 2013

- Location within New York Seventh Lake (the United States)
- Location: Hamilton County, New York
- Coordinates: 43°44′49″N 74°44′35″W, 43°45′00″N 74°46′15″W, 43°44′59″N 74°46′14″W, 43°45′00″N 74°44′08″W
- Type: Lake
- Primary inflows: Eighth Lake, Seventh Lake Inlet, Wheeler Creek, Buck Creek
- Primary outflows: Sixth Lake
- Basin countries: United States
- Surface area: 851 acres (3.44 km^{2})
- Max. depth: 85 feet (26 m)
- Shore length^{1}: 11.2 miles (18.0 km)
- Surface elevation: 1,785 feet (544 m)
- Islands: 3
- Settlements: Inlet, New York
- ^{1} Shore length is not a well-defined measure.

Seventh Lake is located near Inlet, New York. It is part of the Fulton Chain Lakes. The outlet flows through a channel into Sixth Lake and the main inlet flows through a creek from Eighth Lake. Fish species present in the lake are brown trout, lake whitefish, lake trout, smelt, landlocked salmon, rainbow trout, white sucker, black bullhead, yellow perch, and pumpkinseed sunfish. There is a state owned hard surface ramp of NY-28, 3 miles east of Inlet with parking for 20 trucks and trailers.

== Tributaries and locations ==
- Goff Island – An island located by where the Wheeler Creek enters the lake.
