= Inlet, New York =

- Town
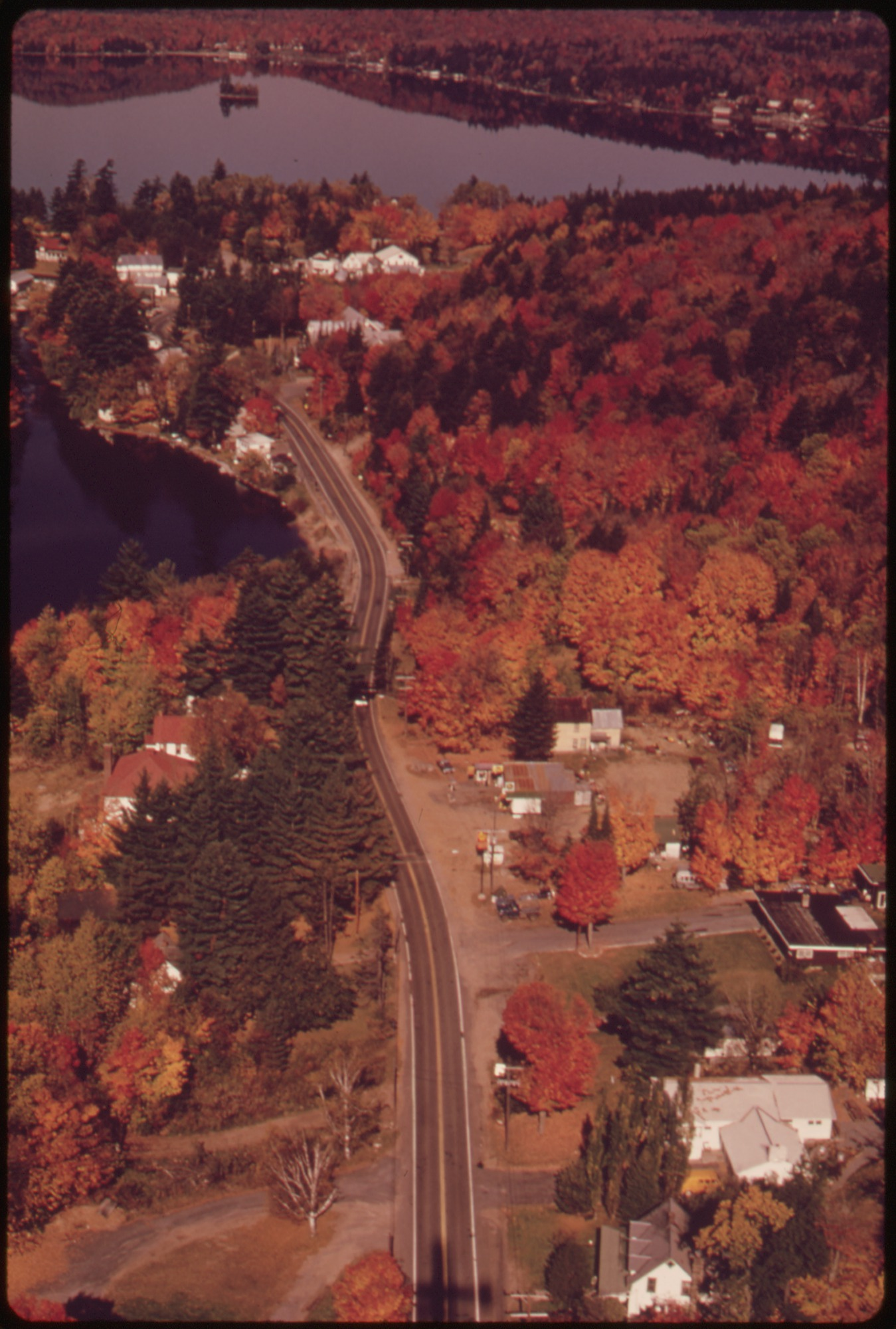
- Aerial view of Inlet in 1973
- Motto: "Share our Good Nature"
- Location in Hamilton County and the state of New York.
- Coordinates: 43°45′03″N 74°47′39″W
- Country: United States
- State: New York
- County: Hamilton

Government
  - Type: Town Council
  - Town Supervisor: John B. Frey (R)
  - Town Council: Members' List: • Herbert W. Schmid (D); • Timothy P. Brownsell (R); • Daniel J. Levi (R); • William J. Faro, II (R)

Area
  - Total: 66.37 sq mi (171.90 km^{2})
  - Land: 62.20 sq mi (161.09 km^{2})
  - Water: 4.17 sq mi (10.81 km^{2})
- Elevation: 1,808 ft (551 m)

Population (2020)
  - Total: 355
- Time zone: UTC-5 (Eastern (EST))
  - Summer (DST): UTC-4 (EDT)
- ZIP code: 13360
- Area code: 315
- FIPS code: 36-041-37495
- GNIS feature ID: 0979093
- Website: townofinlet.org

Inlet is a town in Hamilton County, New York, United States. The population was 355 at the 2020 census, up from 333 in 2010. The name is derived from its location at the eastern end (inlet) of Fourth Lake, part of the Fulton Chain of Lakes.

The town is on the western edge of Hamilton County.

== History ==
The area developed to serve the needs of sportsmen after the middle of the 19th century, and was known as the "Inlet on Fourth Lake". The town of Inlet was formed in 1901 from the north part of the town of Morehouse. In 1901, the community of Inlet set itself off as a village by incorporation but has since abandoned that status.

== About the area ==
Inlet has been a hub of Adirondack tourism for more than a century. Inlet is surrounded by over one million acres (400,000 ha) of lands within the Adirondack Park that are easily accessible.

An American Tragedy, Theodore Dreiser's award-winning novel based on the murder of Grace Brown, included a scene at Arrowhead. The actual murder took place in Punkey Bay on Big Moose Lake in 1906. Three days later, Chester Gillette was arrested at the Arrowhead Hotel in Inlet, the site of the present Arrowhead Park. Gillette was sentenced to die in the electric chair in Auburn, New York. The book was later made into the movie "A Place in the Sun" starring Montgomery Clift and Elizabeth Taylor.

== Geography ==
According to the United States Census Bureau, the town has a total area of 66.4 square miles (171.9 km^{2}), of which 62.2 square miles (161.1 km^{2}) are land and 4.2 square miles (10.8 km^{2}), or 6.29%, are water.

The western town line is the border of Herkimer County. The Moose River defines the southern town line.

New York State Route 28 is an east–west highway across Inlet and is the only significant road in the town.

The Fulton Chain Lakes stretch across Inlet into neighboring areas.

=== Adjacent towns and areas ===
Inlet forms its western border with the towns of Ohio and Webb in Herkimer County. To the south is the town of Morehouse. The town of Long Lake forms the northern and part of the eastern boundary, and the town of Arietta forms the southern part of the eastern boundary.

== Demographics ==
Historical population
Census	Pop.	Note	%±
1910	197		—
1920	171		−13.2%
1930	251		46.8%
1940	310		23.5%
1950	319		2.9%
1960	307		−3.8%
1970	287		−6.5%
1980	320		11.5%
1990	343		7.2%
2000	406		18.4%
2010	333		−18.0%
2020	355		6.6%
U.S. Decennial Census

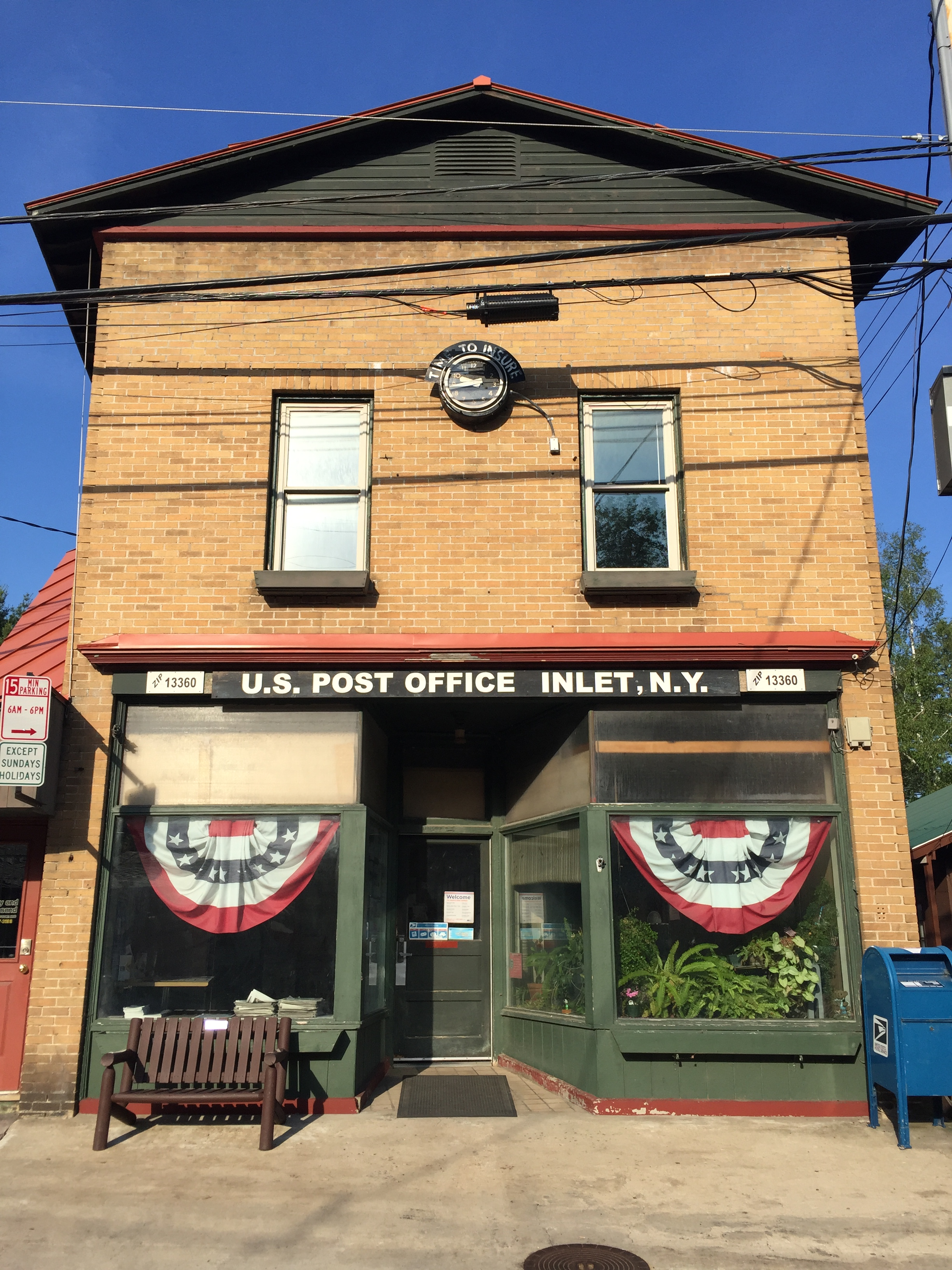
Inlet U.S. Post Office

As of the census of 2000, there were 406 people, 188 households, and 128 families residing in the town. The population density was 6.5 inhabitants per square mile (2.5/km^{2}). There were 1,003 housing units at an average density of 16.1 per square mile (6.2/km^{2}). The racial makeup of the town was 96.31% White, 0.25% Pacific Islander, 3.20% from other races, and 0.25% from two or more races. Hispanic or Latino of any race were 2.46% of the population.

There were 188 households, out of which 22.3% had children under the age of 18 living with them, 59.6% were married couples living together, 5.3% had a female householder with no husband present, and 31.4% were non-families. 29.3% of all households were made up of individuals, and 12.8% had someone living alone who was 65 years of age or older. The average household size was 2.15 and the average family size was 2.59.

In the town, the population was spread out, with 18.2% under the age of 18, 3.0% from 18 to 24, 29.6% from 25 to 44, 30.5% from 45 to 64, and 18.7% who were 65 years of age or older. The median age was 45 years. For every 100 females, there were 106.1 males. For every 100 females age 18 and over, there were 107.5 males.

The median income for a household in the town was $32,574, and the median income for a family was $37,361. Males had a median income of $29,063 versus $15,625 for females. The per capita income for the town was $21,076. About 7.9% of families and 13.2% of the population were below the poverty line, including 15.4% of those under age 18 and 11.1% of those age 65 or over.

== Communities and locations in Inlet ==
- Bug Lake – A lake located north of Seventh Lake.
- Browns Tract Pond – A small lake on the northern edge of the town, bordered by the state-operated Brown Tract Pond Campground.
- Cascade Lake – A lake in the northern corner of the town.
- Eagle Bay – A hamlet in Herkimer County at the western town line of Inlet.
- Eagles Nest Lake – A lake located north of Seventh Lake.
- Eighth Lake – A Fulton Chain Lake, northeast of Seventh Lake. There are no private residences, as the entire lake is within the state forest preserve. There is a state campground located here, between Seventh and Eighth Lake.
- Fifth Lake – A lake located by Inlet; part of the Fulton Chain Lakes.
- Fourth Lake – A large lake shared between the Town of Inlet and Herkimer County. The lake is the largest of the eight lakes of the Fulton Chain. Most of the lake shore is privately owned, though part is state forest preserve. There is a state boat launch in the hamlet of Inlet.
- Inlet – The hamlet of Inlet is on the eastern tip of Fourth Lake near the western town line. Inlet is the only significant community in this town and is located on NY-28. There are gift shops, a grocery store, restaurants, a bike shop, a hardware store, a bookstore, a hotel, town government offices and a public park on Fourth Lake.
- Limekiln Lake – A lake south of Inlet, divided by the western town line. There is a state campground located here.
- Lower Browns Tract Pond – A lake located northeast of Inlet.
- Sixth Lake – A small lake east of Inlet. Most of its shoreline is privately owned, with seasonal residences which are locally called "camps."
- Seventh Lake – A lake east of Sixth Lake, connected by a channel or narrows through which you can go by boat. Seventh Lake is the second largest of the eight lakes in the Fulton Chain. Half of the lakeshore is in the state forest preserve, the rest is privately owned. There is a state boat launch near the east end of the lake.
- Upper Browns Tract Pond – A lake located northeast of Inlet.

== Education ==
It is in the Inlet Common School District.
