= Fulton Chain of Lakes =

String of eight lakes in the Adirondack Park in upstate New York, U.S.

Coordinates: 43°45′N 74°52′W

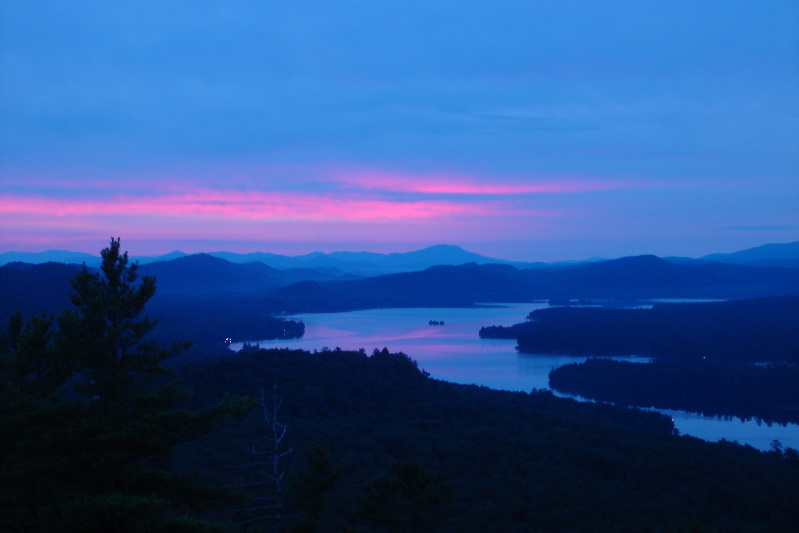
View of Fourth Lake from Bald Mountain

The Fulton Chain of Lakes is a string of eight lakes located in the Adirondack Park in upstate New York, United States. The chain is the dammed-up Moose River, and the dam which creates the chain holds back nearly 6.8 billion US gallons (26,000,000 m^{3}) of water. The lakes are located in Herkimer and Hamilton Counties. Inlet, Old Forge, and Eagle Bay are towns on them. The chain begins near Old Forge and ends before it reaches Raquette Lake. The lakes are named for Robert Fulton, inventor of the steamboat, who proposed connecting the lakes to create an Adirondack canal. They are suitable for pontoon boats (the most popular type in the area), kayaks, and motorboats. The chain is part of the 740-mile (1,190 km) Northern Forest Canoe Trail, which begins on First Lake and ends in Fort Kent, Maine.

== Geography ==
The lakes in the chain have been given ordinal designations: First Lake, Second Lake, Third Lake, Fourth Lake, Fifth Lake, Sixth Lake, Seventh Lake, and Eighth Lake. The chain begins with a small lake not counted in the series called Old Forge Pond. In reality, First, Second and Third Lake are one long lake separated by narrow straits. At the east end of Fourth Lake, by Inlet in Hamilton County, a stream, or channel, allows access to the small Fifth Lake. A portage is necessary to arrive at Sixth Lake, which is also connected by a narrow strait to Seventh Lake. Another portage is required to gain access to Eighth Lake.

Beyond Eighth Lake is Raquette Lake and another string of lakes in Indian Lake, New York.

=== Expansions in 1798 ===
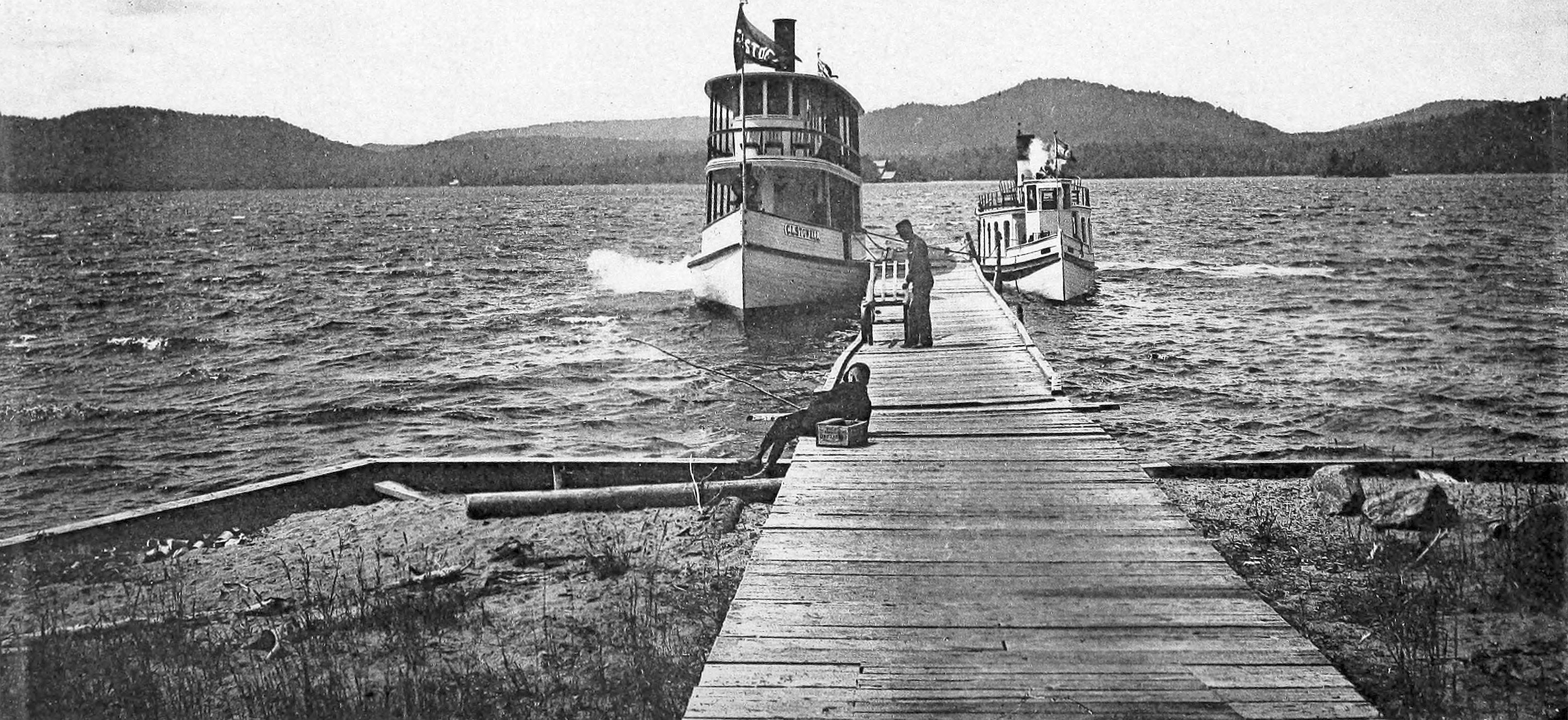
Fourth Lake, 1894

The lakes were expanded from 2,762 acres (11 km^{2}) to 3,481 acres (14 km^{2}) in 1798 when the Moose River was dammed at Old Forge. The present dam at Old Forge holds back 6.8 billion US gallons (26,000,000 m^{3}) of water. This reservoir is managed by the HR-BR Regulating District. In the late 1800s, the State Water Power Commissioner made an agreement with Fulton Chain cottage owners and recreational users to maintain the water level during the summer season, an agreement still in effect.

== Recreation ==
Prior to World War II, the town of Inlet boasted fourteen Adirondack hotels. The Woods Inn is now the only historic hotel remaining open year round. Boating is a popular activity in the Fulton Chain of Lakes because any aspects of the lakes are accessible by water. Tubing, skiing, knee boarding, and wake boarding are all common water recreational activities that are seen while on the Fulton Chain of Lakes. In addition to boating, snowmobiling is also very popular in the region during the Winter.

== Adirondack Canoe Classic ==
The Fulton Chain is the start of the Adirondack Canoe Classic, a three-day, 90-mile (140 km) canoe race. This canoe race is for anyone from beginners to experts, it is a way to get the community together and to get everyone involved with something. Many kids (usually older kids) will go with their parents and form a team. Many people train very hard for this 90 mile race, however some teams just go out there for the comradery of it all and just to have fun with friends. However, it is a rigorous course and includes three days of physical activity and hard work for participants.

== Hiking ==
Hiking is a popular activity in the Adirondack Park because of the high numbers and varieties of hikes available. Some of the varieties of hikes include anything from the High Peaks to the relatively flat hikes of Sis and Bub. Bald Mountain is one of the most popular mountains to hike not only by the Fulton Chain of Lakes but also in the Adirondacks as a whole due to the views of the entire chain. At the top of this mountain there is the Rondaxe Fire Tower that has been restored to allow hikers to climb to the top of it in order to enhance the views of the Fulton Chain of Lakes. Sis and Bub lakes is a relatively flat hike, it has some inclination however it is nothing too drastic. This hike is good for families with younger children because it is not very rigorous or challenging. Another hike is the Sis, Bub, and Moss Lake trail, it is a full loop that connects Sis and Bub lakes to Moss Lake, this hike is very suitable for families and is primarily flat.

== Surrounding towns ==
Inlet is located at the “head of Fourth Lake” and this is where it gets its name from because it is near the inlet of the fourth of the eight lakes. Inlet is a small town that includes a, a post office, grocery store, a realtor’s office, restaurants, other stores and a baseball field. Many of the businesses in the town are family owned and run.

Eagle Bay is a small town that is also located on Fourth lake and includes a neighborhood full of cabins. The town includes restaurants, a laundromat, and a fire station. The neighborhood of Eagle Bay is a small, quaint place where the homes are on mainly square plots set back in the woods, however some of them are waterfront. There are two community beaches that are accessible to homeowners of the neighborhood, as well as boat slips that are available for purchase with the property.

Old Forge is the biggest of the three towns adjacent to the lakes and is also located at the beginning of the Fulton Chain of Lakes, by the Old Forge Pond. In Old Forge there are grocery stores, restaurants, souvenir stores, realtors offices, and a fire station. Old Forge is a well known town all throughout the Adirondacks and especially around the Fulton Chain of Lakes. A well-known water park called Enchanted Forest Water Safari is a very popular tourist attraction in Old Forge and is the largest water park in New York state.
