= List of rivers of New York =

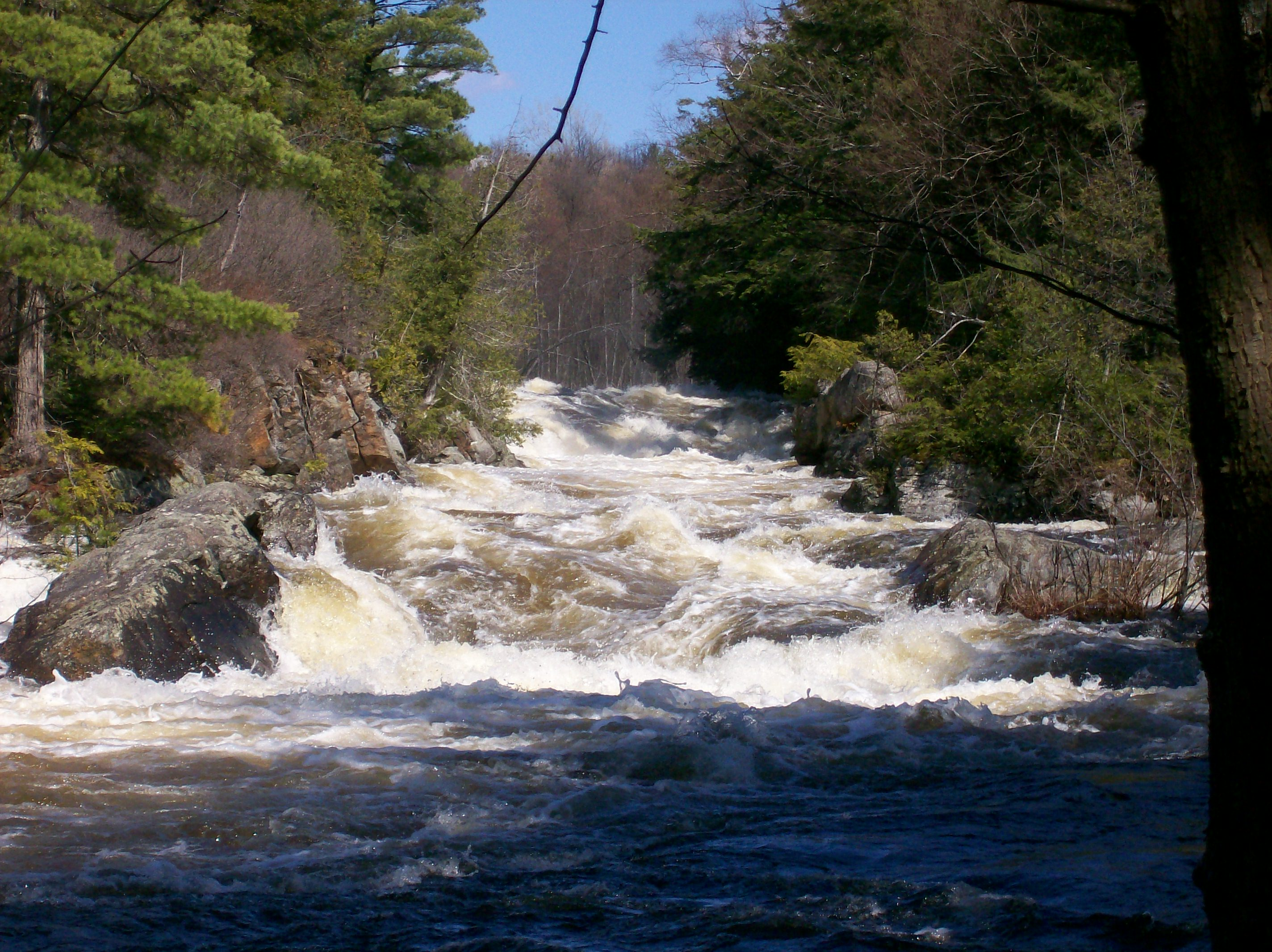
The Raquette River, in Colton, New York

Rivers in the U.S. state of New York include:

== By drainage basin ==
This list is arranged by drainage basin, with tributaries indented by order of confluence, from mouth to source.

=== New York Harbor ===
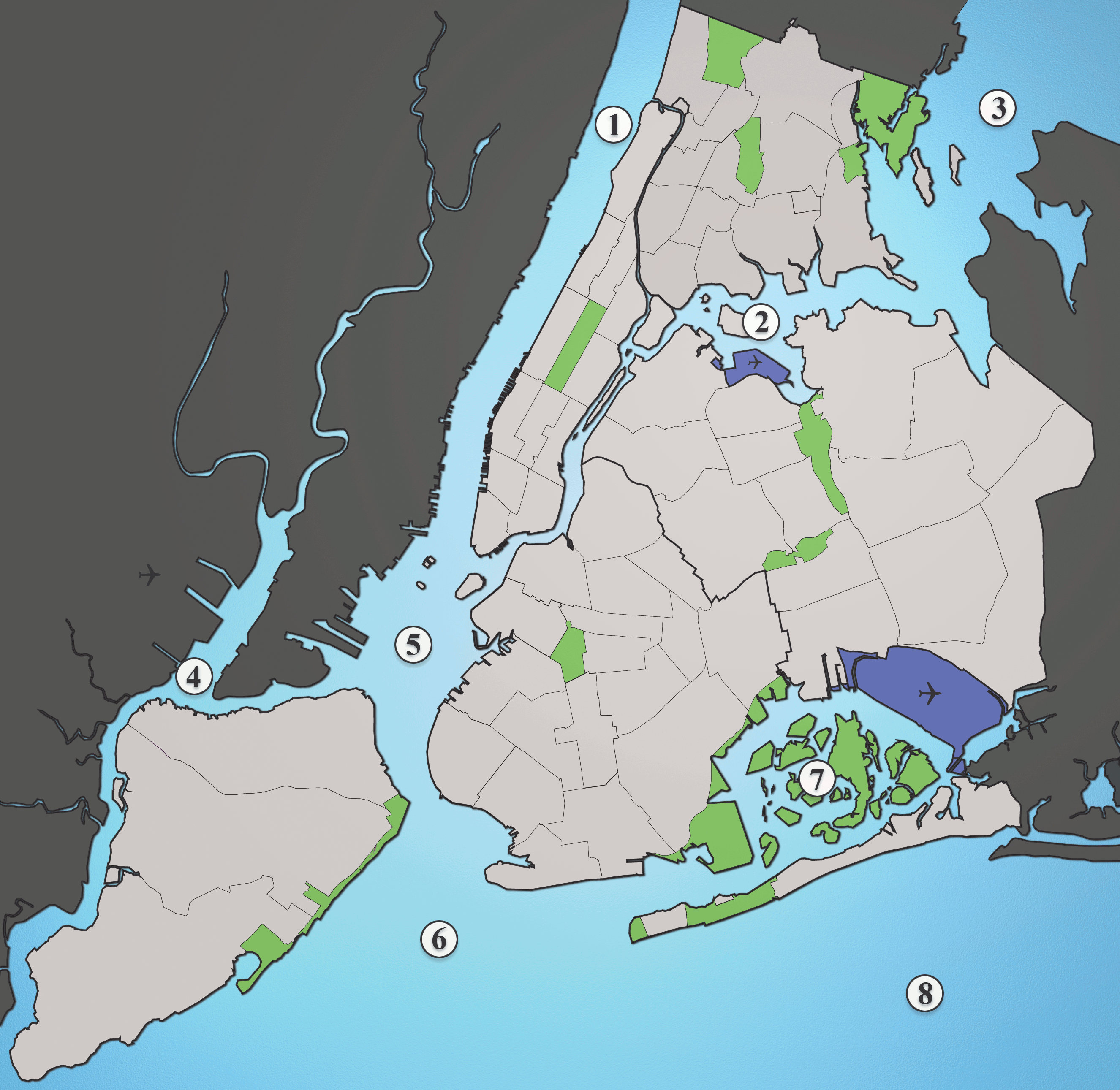
New York City waterways: 1. Hudson River, 2. East River, 3. Long Island Sound, 4. Newark Bay, 5. Upper New York Bay, 6. Lower New York Bay, 7. Jamaica Bay, 8. Atlantic Ocean

==== Block Island Sound ====
- Peconic River
  - Little River

==== Long Island Sound (northern side) ====
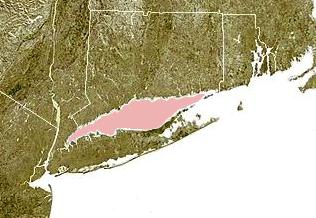
Long Island Sound is shown highlighted in pink between Connecticut (to the north) and Long Island (to the south).

- Housatonic River (CT)
  - Tenmile River
    - Swamp River
      - Mill River
    - Webatuck Creek
  - Green River
- Norwalk River (CT)
  - Silvermine River
- Rippowam River
  - Mill River
- Mianus River
- Byram River
  - Wampus River
- Blind Brook
- Mamaroneck River
  - Sheldrake River
- Hutchinson River
- Hudson River

==== Long Island Sound (southern side) ====
- Nissequogue River
- Wading River
- Carmans River 10 miles
- Connetquot River 6 miles
- Forge River 3.2 miles
- Swan River 2 miles
- Patchogue River 1 mile
- Carlls River
- Massapequa Creek
- Aspatuck River
- Speonk River

==== Arthur Kill ====
- Arthur Kill
- Fresh Kills
  - Richmond Creek
- Passaic River (NJ)
  - Saddle River
  - Pompton River (NJ)
    - Pequannock River (NJ)
      - Wanaque River
        - Ringwood River
    - Ramapo River
      - Mahwah River
- Hackensack River
  - Pascack Brook

==== Upper New York Bay ====
- Kill Van Kull (tidal strait)
- East River (tidal strait)
  - Newtown Creek
  - Harlem River (tidal strait)
  - Bronx Kill (tidal strait)
  - Bronx River
  - Flushing River
  - Westchester Creek

==== Lower New York Bay ====
- Raritan River (NJ)
  - Green Brook (NJ)
  - Lawrence Brook (NJ)
  - Middle Brook (NJ)
  - Mile Run (NJ)
  - Millstone River (NJ)
  - North Branch Raritan River (NJ)
  - Peters Brook (NJ)
  - South Branch Raritan River (NJ)
  - South River (NJ)
- Navesink River (NJ)
  - Swimming River (NJ)
- Shrewsbury River (NJ)

==== Hudson River Basin ====
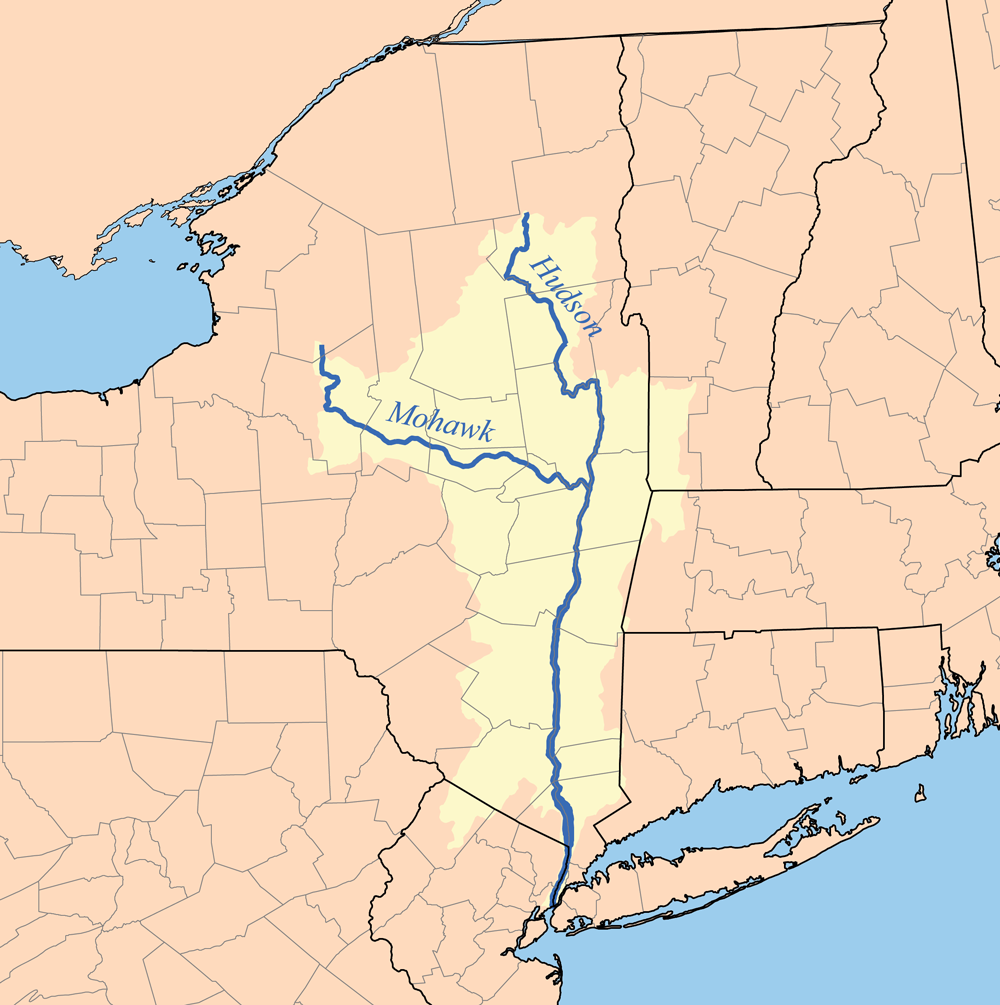
Hudson drainage basin

- Hudson River (also known as the North River)
  - Saw Mill River
    - Rum Brook
    - Mine Brook
    - Nanny Hagen Brook
    - Tertia Brook
  - Wickers Creek
  - Sparkill Creek
  - Sunnyside Brook
  - Pocantico River
    - Caney Brook
    - Rockefeller Brook
    - Gory Brook
  - Sing Sing Brook
  - Croton River
    - Kisco River
    - Muscoot River
    - Cross River
      - Stone Hill River
      - Waccabuc River
    - Titicus River
    - East Branch Croton River
    - Middle Branch Croton River
    - West Branch Croton River
  - Minisceongo Creek
  - Cedar Pond Brook
  - Annsville Creek
    - Peekskill Hollow Creek
    - Sprout Brook
      - Canopus Creek
  - Broccy Creek
  - Popolopen Creek
    - Hemlock Brook
  - Highland Brook
    - Stoney Lonesome Brook
  - Arden Brook
  - Indian Brook
  - Crows Nest Brook
  - Foundry Brook
  - Breakneck Brook
  - Moodna Creek
    - Silver Stream
    - Woodbury Creek
      - Mineral Spring Brook
    - Cromline Creek
    - Otter Kill
      - Black Meadow Creek
      - Beaverdam Brook
  - Gordons Brook
    - Wades Brook
    - Squirrel Hollow Creek
  - Fishkill Creek
    - Clove Creek
    - Sprout Creek
      - Jackson Creek
    - Whortlekill Creek
  - Quassaick Creek
    - Bushfield Creek
    - Gedneytown Creek
  - Wappinger Creek
    - Little Wappinger Creek
  - Lattintown Creek
  - Casperkill
    - Fonteyn Kill
  - Fall Kill
  - Twaalfskill Creek
  - Maritje Kill
  - Crum Elbow Creek
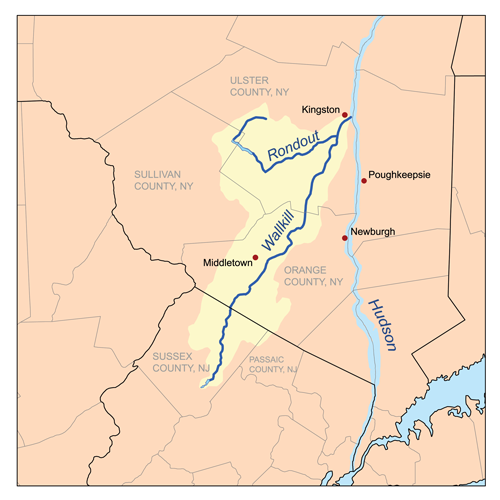
    Rondout drainage basin
  - Bard Rock Creek
  - Indian Kill
  - North Staatsburg Creek
  - Black Creek (Hudson River tributary)
  - Fallsburg Creek
  - Landsman Kill
    - Rhinebeck Kill
  - Rondout Creek
    - Wallkill River
      - Shawangunk Kill
        - Dwaar Kill (Shawangunk Kill tributary)
        - Pakasink Creek
        - Verkeerder Kill
        - Platte Kill (Shawangunk Kill tributary)
        - Little Shawangunk Kill
      - Dwaar Kill (Wallkill River tributary)
      - Tin Brook
      - Muddy Kill
      - Mannayunk Kill
      - Monhagen Brook
      - Pochuck Creek
        - Wawayanda Creek
      - Rutgers Creek
        - Catlin Creek
          - Joe Creek
        - Indigot Creek
    - Cottekill Brook
    - Coxing Kill
    - Kripplebush Creek
    - Peters Kill
    - Stony Kill
      - Sanders Kill
    - Rochester Creek
      - Mill Brook (Rochester Creek tributary)
      - Vly Brook
      - Mettacahonts Creek
    - Ver Nooy Kill
    - Beer Kill Creek
      - Fantine Kill
    - Brandy Brook
    - Trout Creek (Rondout Creek tributary)
    - Chestnut Creek (Rondout Creek tributary)
    - Sugarloaf Brook
    - Sundown Creek
    - High Falls Brook
    - Stone Cabin Brook
    - Bear Hole Brook
    - Buttermilk Falls Brook
    - Picket Brook
  - Mudder Kill
  - Saw Kill
    - Lakes Kill
  - Stony Creek
  - Esopus Creek
    - Plattekill Creek (Esopus Creek tributary)
    - Saw Kill (Esopus Creek tributary)
    - Bush Kill (Esopus Creek tributary)
      - Maltby Hollow Brook
        - Wittenberg Brook
      - South Hollow Brook
      - Kanape Brook
    - Little Beaver Kill (Esopus Creek tributary)
    - Beaver Kill (Esopus Creek tributary)
    - Woodland Creek
      - Muddy Brook (Woodland Creek tributary)
      - Panther Kill
      - Dougherty Branch
    - Stony Clove Creek
      - Hollow Tree Brook
    - Bushnellsville Creek
      - Angle Creek (Bushnellsville Creek tributary)
    - Birch Creek (Esopus Creek tributary)
    - Elk Bushkill
  - Sawyer Kill
  - Roeliff Jansen Kill
    - Shekomeko Creek
      - Bean River
    - Bash Bish Brook
  - Catskill Creek
    - Kaaterskill Creek
    - Potic Creek
      - Cob Creek
    - Jan De Bakkers Kill
    - Basic Creek
      - Wolf Fly Creek
    - Bowery Creek
    - Tenmile Creek
      - Eightmile Creek
    - Fox Creek
    - Lake Creek
  - Stockport Creek
    - Claverack Creek
      - Taghkanic Creek
    - Kinderhook Creek
      - Valatie Kill
      - Kline Kill
      - Stony Kill
      - Tackawasick Creek
      - Wyomanock Creek
      - Black River
  - Mill Creek
  - Coxsackie Creek
  - Hannacrois Creek
  - Coeymans Creek
    - Mosher Brook
    - Onesquethaw Creek
  - Schodack Creek
    - Muitzes Kill
  - Mill Creek
  - Vloman Kill
    - Dowers Kill
    - Phillipin Kill
  - Moordener Kill
  - Normans Kill
    - Bozen Kill
  - Wynants Kill
  - Poesten Kill
    - Quacken Kill
  - Mohawk River
    - Alplaus Kill
    - Delphus Kill
    - Shakers Creek
    - Lisha Kill
    - Plotter Kill
    - Moccasin Kill
    - Sandsea Kill
    - Terwilleger Creek
    - North Chuctanunda Creek
    - South Chuctanunda Creek
    - Schoharie Creek
      - Cobleskill Creek
        - West Creek
      - Fox Creek
        - Switz Kill
      - Batavia Kill
      - Little West Kill
      - West Kill
        - Hunter Brook
      - East Kill
    - Auries Creek
    - Cayadutta Creek
    - Van Wie Creek
    - Yatesville Creek
    - Lasher Creek
    - Flat Creek
    - Canajoharie Creek
    - Otsquago Creek
      - Otsquene Creek
      - Otstungo Creek
      - Loyal Creek
    - Caroga Creek
      - Peck Creek
      - Sprite Creek
      - Mill Creek
      - Glasgow Creek
      - North Creek
    - East Canada Creek
      - Spruce Creek
      - Sprite Creek
    - Nowadaga Creek
    - West Canada Creek
      - Honnedaga Brook
      - Seabury Brook
      - Big Brook
      - Mill Creek
      - Mad Tom Brook
      - Concklin Brook
      - Cincinnati Creek
      - Shed Brook
      - Mill Brook
      - Indian River
      - Metcalf Brook
      - Betty Green Brook
      - South Branch West Canada Creek
      - Fourmile Brook
      - Mill Creek
      - Cold Brook
      - Oklahoma Creek
      - White Creek
        - Grandpa’s River (White Creek tributary)
      - City Brook
      - Maltanner Creek
      - Stony Creek
      - North Creek
    - Fulmer Creek
      - Flat Creek
      - Day Creek
    - Steele Creek
    - Moyer Creek
    - Sauquoit Creek
    - Oriskany Creek
    - Ninemile Creek
    - Sixmile Creek
    - Hurlbut Glen Brook
    - Wells Creek
    - Tannery Brook
    - Stringer Brook
    - Lansing Kill
    - Haynes Brook
    - Blue Brook
  - Hoosic River
    - Tomhannock Creek
      - Sunkauissia Creek
    - Owl Kill
    - Walloomsac River
    - Little Hoosic River
  - Fish Creek
    - Kayaderosseras Creek
      - Glowegee Creek
  - Batten Kill
  - Slocum Creek
  - Moses Kill
    - Dead Creek
  - Snook Kill
  - Champlain Canal
  - Sturdevant Creek
  - Sacandaga River
    - Paul Creek
    - Kennyetto Creek
    - East Stony Creek
    - West Stony Creek
    - West Branch Sacandaga River
      - Hamilton Lake Stream
      - Piseco Outlet
        - Fall Stream
    - East Branch Sacandaga River
    - Kunjamuk River
  - Schroon River
    - Trout Brook
      - Minerva Stream
    - The Branch
  - Patterson Brook
  - North Creek
  - Boreas River
  - Indian River
    - Jessup River
    - Miami River
  - Cedar River
    - Rock River
  - Goodnow River
  - Newcomb River
  - Opalescent River

=== Delaware River Basin ===
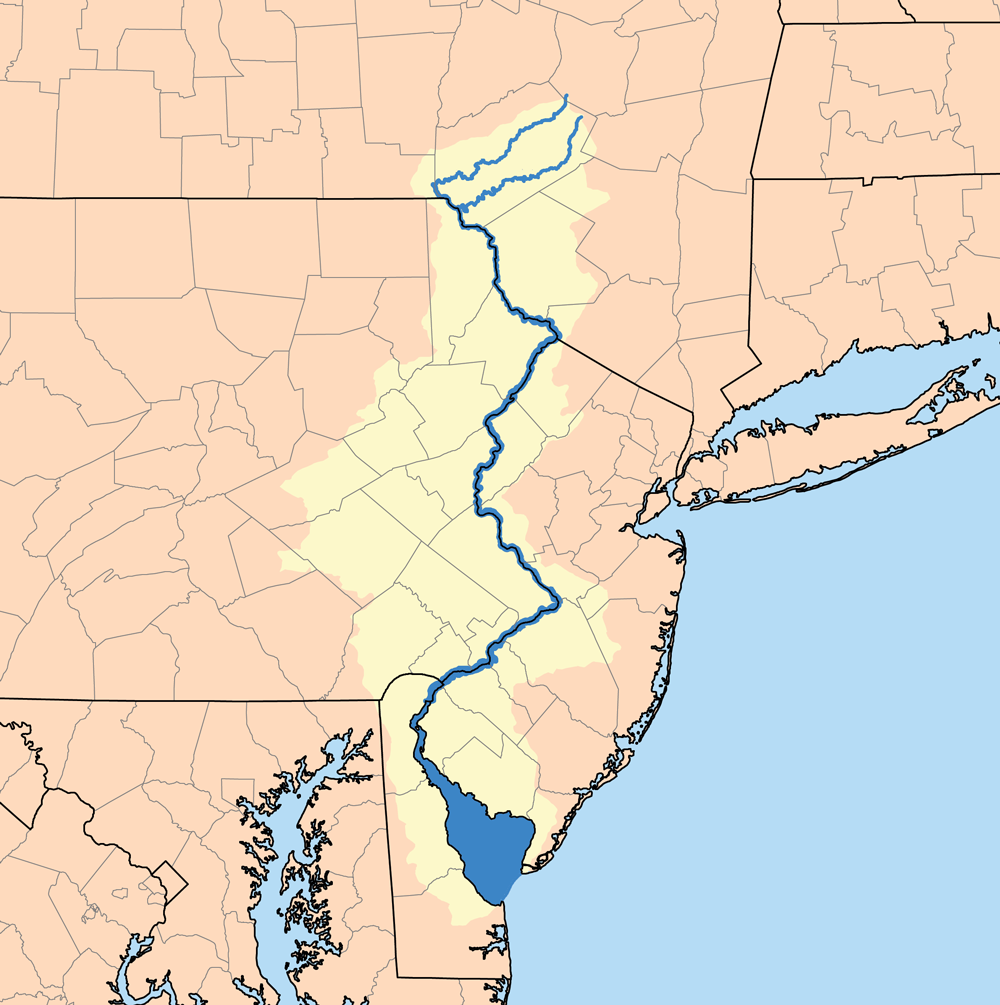
Delaware drainage basin

- Delaware River
  - Neversink River
    - Basher Kill
    - Sheldrake Stream
    - East Branch Neversink River
      - Erts Brook
      - Riley Brook
      - Tray Mill Brook
      - Flat Brook (East Branch Neversink River tributary)
      - Deer Shanty Brook
      - Donovan Brook
    - West Branch Neversink River
      - Fall Brook (West Branch Neversink River tributary)
      - Flat Brook (West Branch Neversink River tributary)
      - High Falls Brook
      - Biscuit Brook
        - Pigeon Brook
  - Mongaup River
    - Black Brook (Mongaup River tributary)
    - West Branch Mongaup River
    - Middle Mongaup River
    - East Mongaup River
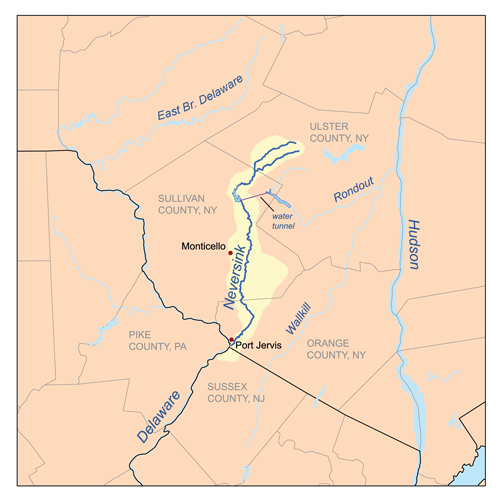
      Neversink drainage basin
  - Tenmile River
  - Callicoon Creek
    - East Branch Callicoon Creek
    - North Branch Callicoon Creek
  - Hankins Creek
  - Basket Creek
    - North Branch Basket Creek
    - East Branch Basket Creek
  - Hoolihan Brook
  - Pea Brook
  - Bouchoux Brook
  - Abe Lord Creek
  - Humphries Brook
  - Blue Mill Stream
  - East Branch Delaware River
    - Beaver Kill
      - Willowemoc Creek
        - Little Beaver Kill
        - Fir Brook
      - Jersey Brook
      - Voorhees Brook
      - Shin Creek
      - Mary Smith Brook
      - Upper Beech Hill Brook
      - Alder Creek (Beaver Kill tributary)
      - Scudder Brook
      - Black Brook (Beaver Kill tributary)
      - Gulf of Mexico Brook
    - Tremper Kill
    - Platte Kill
  - West Branch Delaware River
    - Oquaga Creek
    - Little Delaware River

=== Susquehanna River Basin ===
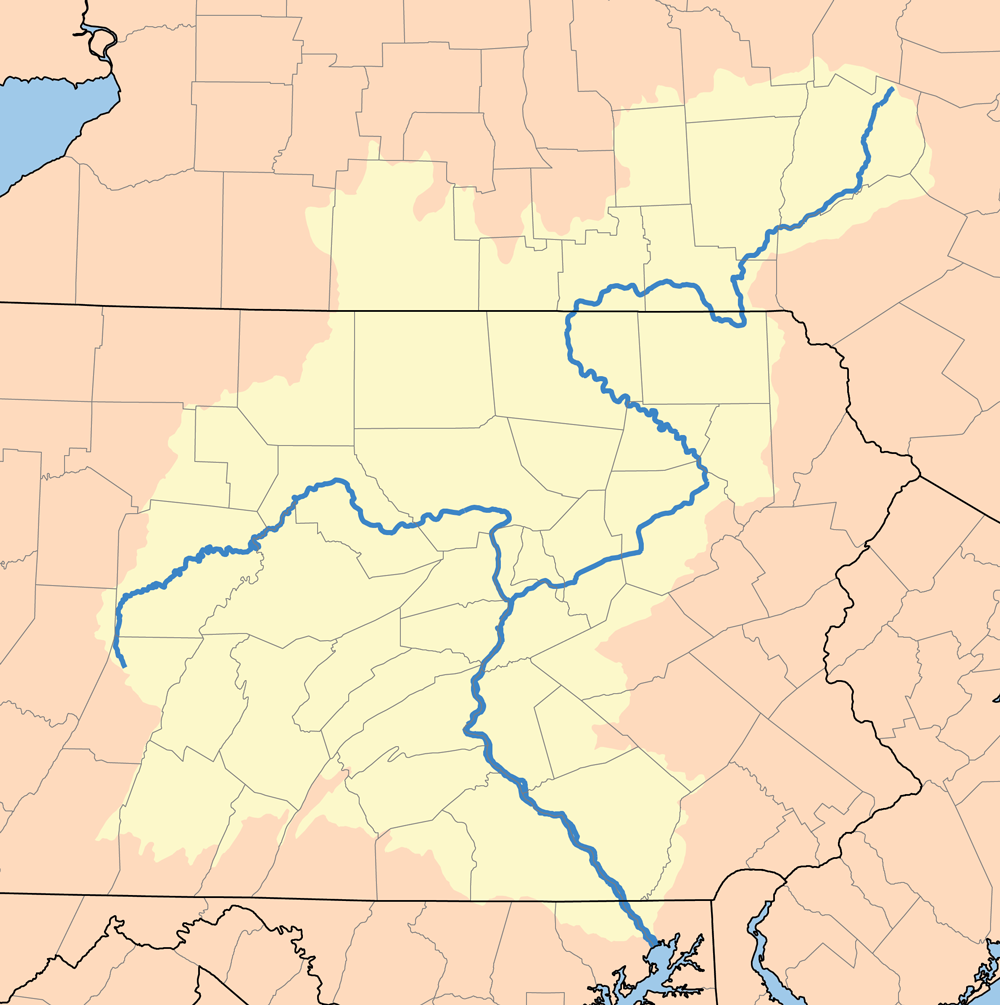
Susquehanna drainage basin

- Susquehanna River
  - Chemung River
    - Baldwin Creek
    - Bentley Creek
    - Seeley Creek
      - South Creek
      - Mudlick Creek
    - Newtown Creek
    - Post Creek
    - Cohocton River
      - Meads Creek
      - Mud Creek
      - Campbell Creek
      - Fivemile Creek
      - Goff Creek
    - Tioga River
      - Canisteo River
        - Tuscarora Creek
          - North Branch Tuscarora Creek
        - Colonel Bills Creek
        - Bennetts Creek
          - Purdy Creek
        - Crosby Creek
        - Canacadea Creek
      - Cowanesque River
        - Troups Creek
        - North Fork Cowanesque River
  - Cayuta Creek
  - Wappasening Creek
  - Pipe Creek
  - Owego Creek
    - Catatonk Creek
      - Willseyville Creek
    - East Branch Owego Creek
    - West Branch Owego Creek
  - Apalachin Creek
  - Nanticoke Creek
  - Choconut Creek
  - Chenango River
    - Page Brook
    - Tioughnioga River
      - Otselic River
        - Merrill Creek
        - Mud Creek
      - Dudley Creek
      - Hunts Creek
      - Labrador Creek
      - East Branch Tioughnioga River
      - West Branch Tioughnioga River
    - Genegantslet Creek
    - Bowman Creek
    - Mill Brook
    - Canasawacta Creek
    - Sangerfield River
    - Electric Light Stream
    - Callahan Brook
  - Little Snake Creek
  - Snake Creek
  - Tuscarora Creek
  - Hotchkins Creek
  - Sanford Creek
  - Occanum Creek
  - Sage Creek
  - Ouaquaga Creek
  - Watersnake Creek
  - Belden Brook
  - Wylie Brook
  - Reed Creek
  - Cornell Creek
  - Kelsey Brook
  - Landers Creek
  - Osborn Brook
  - Newton Brook
  - Yaleville Creek
  - Unadilla River
    - Butternut Creek
    - Wharton Creek
    - Beaver Creek
  - Carrs Creek
  - Martin Brook
  - Ouleout Creek
    - Treadwell Creek
  - Sand Hill Creek
  - Brier Creek
  - Flax Island Creek
  - Otsdawa Creek
  - Mill Creek
  - Otego Creek
  - Charlotte Creek
  - Schenevus Creek
    - Elk Creek
  - Cherry Valley Creek
  - Burditt Brook
  - Black Brook
  - Chase Creek
  - Oaks Creek
    - Fly Creek
      - Muskrat Pond Outlet
    - Lidell Creek
    - Phinney Creek
  - Red Creek

=== St. Lawrence River Basin ===
==== Lake Champlain ====
Lake Champlain drainage basin

- Great Chazy River
  - Beaver Creek
  - North Branch Great Chazy River
- Little Chazy River
- Saranac River
  - North Branch Saranac River
- Salmon River
- Little Ausable River
- Ausable River
  - East Branch Ausable River
  - West Branch Ausable River
    - Black Brook
    - Chubb River
- Boquet River
  - North Branch Boquet River
  - Black River
- La Chute
  - Northwest Bay Brook
- East Bay
  - Poultney River
- Mettawee River
  - Wood Creek (Champlain Canal)
    - Halfway Creek
    - Big Creek
  - Indian River

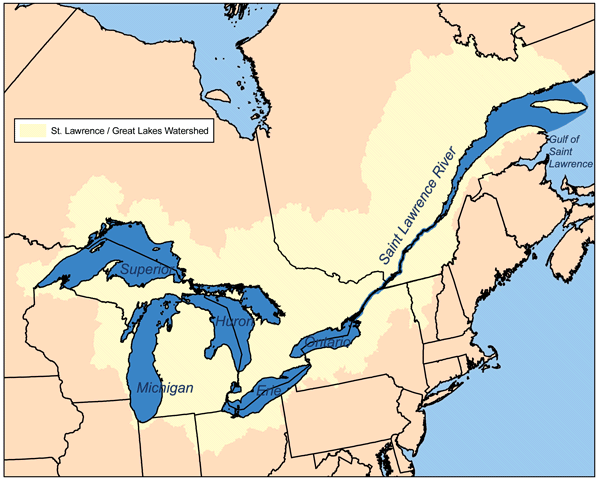
St. Lawrence/Great Lakes drainage basin

==== St. Lawrence River ====
- Saint Lawrence River
  - English River
  - Chateauguay River
    - Marble River
  - Trout River
    - Little Trout River
  - Salmon River
    - Pike Creek
    - Little Salmon River
      - Farrington Brook
  - St. Regis River
    - Deer River
      - Trout Brook (Deer River tributary)
      - West Branch Deer River
    - West Branch St. Regis River
      - Trout Brook (St. Regis River tributary)
      - Stony Brook
      - Long Pond Outlet
      - Windfall Brook
    - Lake Ozonia Outlet
    - East Branch St. Regis River
      - Osgood River
    - Onion River
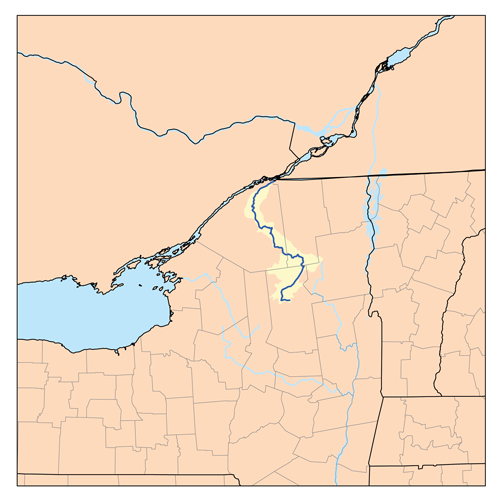
      Raquette drainage basin
  - Raquette River
    - Plum Brook
    - Trout Brook (Raquette River tributary)
    - Jordan River
    - Bog River
      - Round Lake Stream
    - Ampersand Brook
    - Moose Creek
    - Cold River
    - Big Brook
    - Salmon River
    - Marion River
    - South Inlet
  - Grass River
    - Little River
    - Harrison Creek
      - Tanner Creek (Grass River tributary)
    - North Branch Grass River
    - Middle Branch Grass River
    - South Branch Grass River
  - Brandy Brook
  - Sucker Brook
  - Oswegatchie River
    - Indian River
      - Black Creek
      - Otter Creek
      - West Creek
      - Bonaparte Creek
    - Indian Creek
    - West Branch Oswegatchie River
      - Big Creek
      - Middle Branch Oswegatchie River
        - Palmer Creek
    - Little River
    - Robinson River
  - Chippewa Creek
  - Crooked Creek
  - Cranberry Creek
  - Mullet Creek
  - French Creek

==== Lake Ontario ====
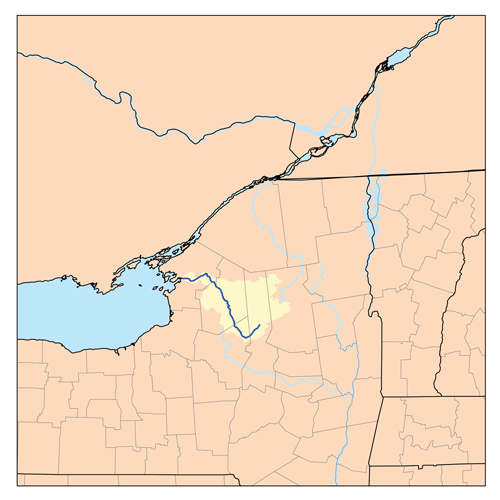
Black drainage basin

- Chaumont River
- Perch River
- Black River
  - Deer River
    - West Branch Deer River
  - Beaver River
    - Black Creek
  - Crystal Creek
  - Independence River
  - Roaring Brook
  - Otter Creek
  - Moose River
    - Pine Creek
    - Middle Branch Moose River
      - North Branch Moose River
    - South Branch Moose River
      - Red River
      - Indian River
        - Cobblestone Creek
      - Otter Brook
  - Sugar River
    - Moose Creek
    - White River
  - Woodhull Creek
    - Little Woodhull Creek
  - Little Black Creek
- Mill Creek
- Stony Creek
- Sandy Creek (Jefferson County, New York)
  - South Sandy Creek
    - Abijah Creek
    - Grunley Creek
  - North Branch Sandy Creek
  - Gulf Stream
- Little Sandy Creek
- Salmon River
  - North Branch Salmon River
    - Mad River
  - East Branch Salmon River
- Grindstone Creek
  - North Branch Grindstone Creek
  - South Branch Grindstone Creek
- Little Salmon River
  - North Branch Little Salmon River
  - South Branch Little Salmon River

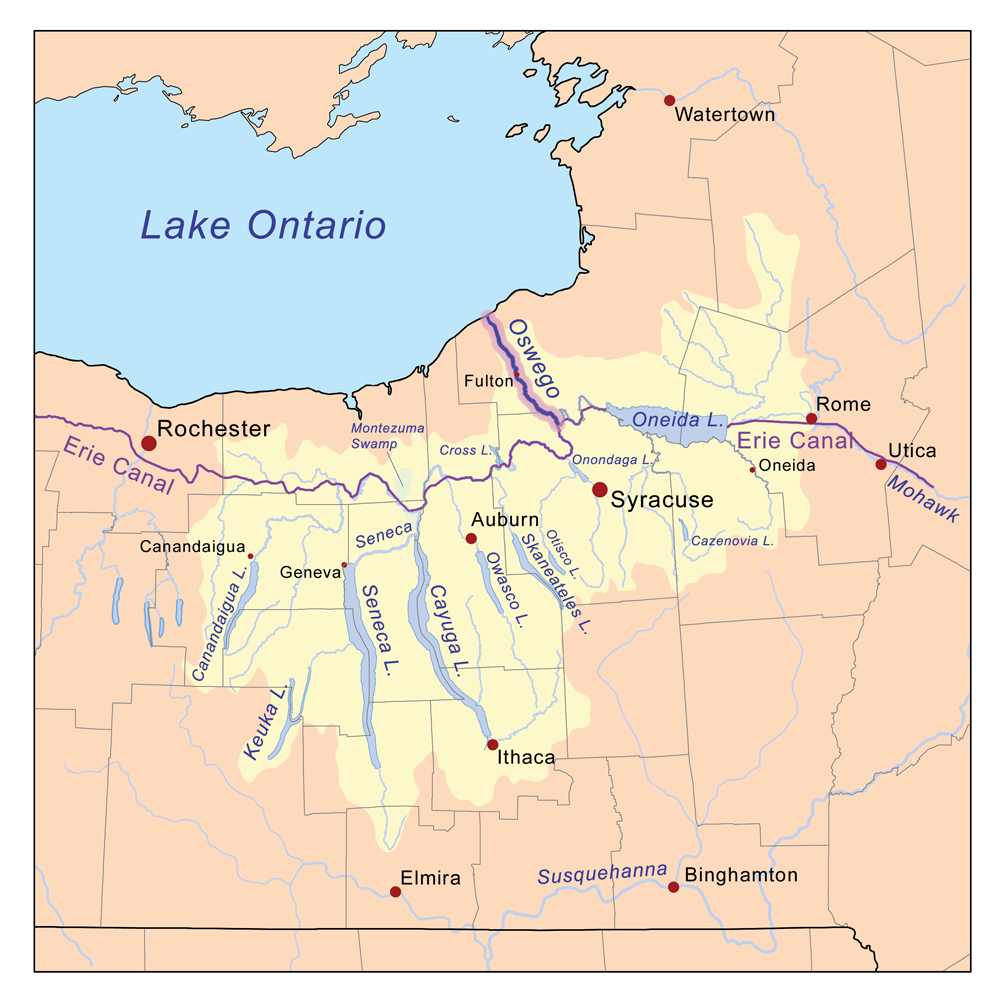
Oswego River drainage basin

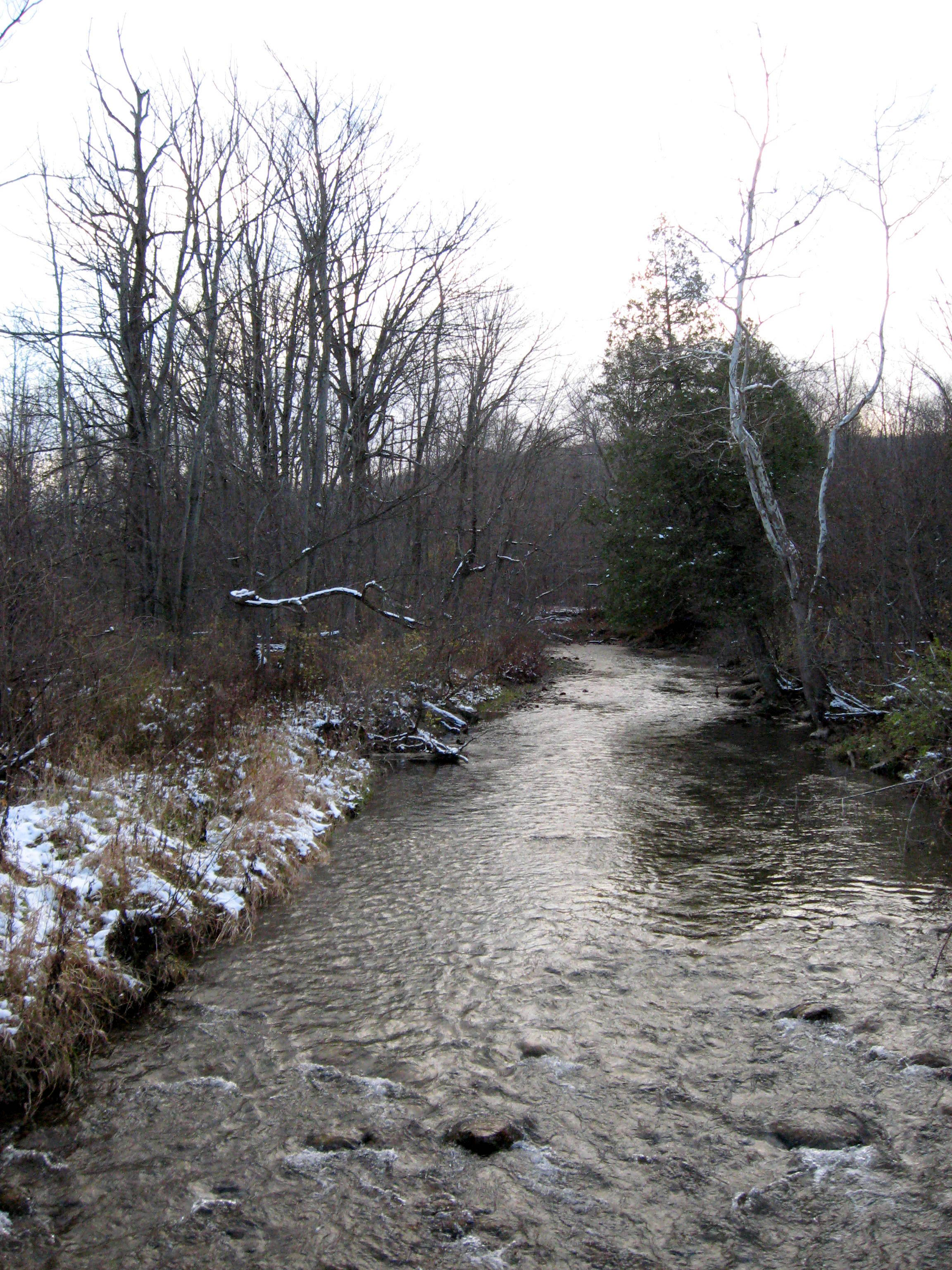
Butternut Creek, Onondaga County

- Oswego River
  - Oneida River
    - Caughdenoy Creek
    - Oneida Lake:
      - Scriba Creek
      - Chittenango Creek
        - Limestone Creek
          - Butternut Creek
      - Oneida Creek
      - Fish Creek
        - Wood Creek
        - East Branch Fish Creek
          - Point Rock Creek
        - West Branch Fish Creek
          - Little River (Fish Creek tributary)
          - Mad River
            - Little River (Mad River tributary)
  - Seneca River
    - Onondaga Lake:
      - Ninemile Creek
      - Ley Creek
      - Onondaga Creek
    - Skaneateles Creek
    - Owasco Outlet
    - Clyde River
      - Canandaigua Outlet
        - Flint Creek
        - Canandaigua Lake:
          - West River
      - Ganargua Creek
        - Mud Creek
      - Sucker Brook
    - Cayuga Lake:
      - Trumansburg Creek
      - Taughannock Creek
      - Salmon Creek
      - Fall Creek
        - Virgil Creek
      - Cayuga Inlet
        - Six Mile Creek
          - Enfield Creek
          - Buttermilk Creek
    - Seneca Lake:
      - Keuka Lake Outlet
      - Catharine Creek
- Ninemile Creek
- Sterling Creek
- Irondequoit Creek

Genesee drainage basin

- Genesee River
  - Black Creek (Genesee River-Monroe County, New York)
  - Oatka Creek
  - Honeoye Creek
  - Canaseraga Creek
  - Wiscoy Creek
  - Rush Creek
  - Cold Creek
  - Caneadea Creek
  - Black Creek (Genesee River-Allegany County, New York)
  - Angelica Creek
    - Baker Creek
    - Black Creek (Angelica Creek tributary)
  - Van Campen Creek
  - Vandermark Creek
  - Dyke Creek
  - Chenunda Creek
  - Cryder Creek
- Salmon Creek
  - Otis Creek
- Sandy Creek (Monroe County, New York)
- Oak Orchard Creek
- Johnson Creek
- Eighteen Mile Creek
- Niagara River
  - Fish Creek
  - Bloody Run
  - Gill Creek
  - Cayuga Creek
  - Woods Creek
  - Burnt Ship Creek
  - Gun Creek
  - Little Sixmile Creek
  - Big Sixmile Creek
  - Spicer Creek
  - Tonawanda Creek
    - Ellicott Creek
  - Two Mile Creek
  - Scajaquada Creek

==== Lake Erie ====
- Buffalo River
  - Cazenovia Creek
    - East Branch Cazenovia Creek
    - West Branch Cazenovia Creek
  - Cayuga Creek (Erie County, New York)
  - Buffalo Creek
    - Hunters Creek
- Eighteen Mile Creek
  - South Branch Eighteenmile Creek
- Cattaraugus Creek
  - South Branch Cattaraugus Creek
    - Mansfield Creek
  - Buttermilk Creek
- Canadaway Creek
- Chautauqua Creek
- Twentymile Creek
- Silver Creek
- Big Sister Creek

=== Mississippi River Basin ===
- Mississippi River
  - Ohio River
    - Allegheny River
      - French Creek
      - Brokenstraw Creek
      - Conewango Creek
        - Stillwater Creek
        - Cassadaga Creek
          - Chadakoin River
      - Red House Brook
      - Little Valley Creek
      - Great Valley Creek
        - Wrights Creek
        - Forks Creek
        - Beaver Meadows Creek
        - Devereaux Branch
      - Tunungwant Creek
        - Rice Brook
          - Irish Brook
        - Bailley Brook
        - Leonard Brook
        - Limestone Brook
        - Nichols Run
      - Olean Creek
        - Ischua Creek
          - Gates Creek
        - Oil Creek
      - Haskell Creek
      - Dodge Creek
      - Oswayo Creek
        - Little Genesee Creek

== Alphabetically ==
- Abijah Creek
- Allegheny River
- Alplaus Kill
- Ampersand Brook
- Angelica Creek
- Annsville Creek
- Apalachin Creek
- Arthur Kill (tidal strait)
- Aspatuck River
- Ausable River
- Baldwin Creek
- Baker Creek
- Bash Bish Brook
- Basher Kill
- Basic Creek
- Batten Kill
- Bean River
- Beaver Creek (Great Chazy River tributary)
- Beaver Creek (Unadilla River tributary)
- Beaver Kill
- Beaver Kill (Esopus Creek tributary)
- Beaver Meadows Creek
- Beaver River
- Beecher Creek
- Bennetts Creek
- Bentley Creek
- Big Brook
- Big Creek (Champlain Canal)
- Big Creek (Oswegatchie River tributary)
- Big Sixmile Creek (Grand Island, New York)
- Black Brook (Ausable River tributary)
- Black Brook (Mongaup River tributary)
- Black Creek (Angelica Creek tributary)
- Black Creek (Beaver River tributary)
- Black Creek (Genesee River-Allegany County, New York)
- Black Creek (Genesee River-Monroe County, New York)
- Black Creek (Indian River tributary)
- Black Creek (West Canada Creek tributary)
- Black Meadow Creek
- Black River, in the western Adirondacks
- Black River (Boquet River tributary)
- Black River (Kinderhook Creek tributary)
- Bloody Run (Niagara County, New York)
- Bog River
- Bowman Creek
- Bonaparte Creek
- Boquet River
- Boreas River
- Bowery Creek
- Bozen Kill
- Brandy Brook
- Bronx Kill (tidal strait)
- Bronx River
- Buffalo River (includes Buffalo Creek)
- Burnt Ship Creek (Grand Island, New York)
- Burditt Brook
- Buttermilk Creek
- Butternut Creek (Oneida Lake)
- Butternut Creek (Limestone Creek tributary)
- Butternut Creek (Unadilla River tributary)
- Byram River
- Callicoon Creek
- Campbell Creek
- Canacadea Creek
- Canadaway Creek
- Canajoharie Creek
- Canandaigua Outlet
- Canasawacta Creek
- Caneadea Creek
- Canisteo River
- Carlls River
- Carmans River
- Caroga Creek
- Casperkill
- Catatonk Creek
- Catharine Creek
- Catskill Creek
- Cattaraugus Creek
- Caughdenoy Creek
- Cayadutta Creek
- Cayuga Creek (Erie County, New York)
- Cayuga Creek (Niagara County, New York)
- Cayuga Inlet
- Cayuta Creek
- Cazenovia Creek
- Cedar River
- Cedar Swamp Creek
- Chadakoin River
- Champlain Canal
- Charlotte Creek
- Chateauguay River
- Chaumont River
- Chautauqua Creek
- Chemung River
- Chenango River
- Chenunda Creek
- Cherry Valley Creek
- Chippewa Creek
- Choconut Creek
- Chubb River
- Cincinnati Creek
- Claverack Creek
- Clove Creek
- Clyde River
- Cob Creek
- Cobblestone Creek
- Cobleskill Creek
- Coeymans Creek
- Cohocton River
- Cold Brook
- Cold Creek
- Cold River
- Coles Creek
- Colonel Bills Creek
- Conewango Creek
- Connetquot River
- Cowanesque River
- Coxsackie Creek
- Cranberry Creek
- Cromline Creek
- Crooked Creek
- Crosby Creek
- Cross River
- Croton River
- Cryder Creek
- Crystal Creek
- Dead Creek
- Deer River (Black River tributary)
- Deer River (St. Regis River tributary)
- Delaware River
- Devereaux Branch
- Dodge Creek
- Dowers Kill
- Dudley Creek
- Dwaar Kill (Shawangunk Kill tributary)
- Dwaar Kill (Wallkill River tributary)
- Dyke Creek
- East Branch Ausable River
- East Branch Callicoon Creek
- East Branch Cazenovia Creek
- East Branch Croton River
- East Branch Delaware River
- East Branch Neversink River
- East Branch Owego Creek
- East Branch Sacandaga River
- East Branch St. Regis River
- East Branch Salmon River
- East Branch Tioughnioga River
- East Canada Creek
- East Kill
- East Mongaup River
- East River (tidal strait)
- East Stony Creek
- Eighteen Mile Creek (Erie County)
- Eighteen Mile Creek (Niagara County)
- Eightmile Creek
- Ellicott Creek
- English River
- Esopus Creek
- Fall Creek
- Fall Stream
- Farrington Brook
- Fish Creek (Hudson River tributary)
- Fish Creek (Niagara County, New York)
- Fish Creek (Oneida Lake tributary)
- Fishkill Creek
- Fivemile Creek
- Flat Creek (Mohawk River tributary)
- Flat Creek (Fulmer Creek tributary)
- Flint Creek
- Flushing River
- Fly Creek (Oaks Creek tributary)
- Fly Creek (Sacandaga River tributary)
- Fly Creek (Schoharie River tributary)
- Forge River
- Forks Creek
- Fox Creek (Catskill Creek tributary)
- Fox Creek (Schoharie Creek tributary)
- French Creek (Allegheny River tributary)
- French Creek (St. Lawrence River tributary)
- Fresh Kills
- Fulmer Creek
- Gates Creek
- Genesee River
- Gill Creek (Niagara County, New York)
- Glowegee Creek
- Goff Creek
- Goodnow River
- Grasse River
- Great Chazy River
- Green River
- Grunley Creek
- Gulf Stream
- Gun Creek (Grand Island, New York)
- Hackensack River
- Halfway Creek
- Hamilton Lake Stream
- Hannacrois Creek
- Harlem River (tidal strait)
- Harrison Creek
- Haskell Creek
- Hemlock Creek (New York)
- Honeoye Creek
- Hoosic River
- Hudson River
- Hunters Creek
- Hunts Creek
- Hutchinson River
- Independence River
- Indian Creek
- Indian River (Black Lake)
- Indian River (Hudson River tributary)
- Indian River (Mettawee River tributary)
- Indian River (Moose River tributary)
- Indian River (West Canada Creek tributary)
- Irondequoit Creek
- Ischua Creek
- Jackson Creek
- Jan De Bakkers Kill
- Jessup River
- Johnson Creek
- Jordan River
- Kaaterskill Creek
- Kayaderosseras Creek
- Kennyetto Creek
- Keuka Lake Outlet
- Kill Van Kull (tidal strait)
- Kinderhook Creek
- Kisco River
- Kline Kill
- Kunjamuk River
- La Chute
- Lake Creek
- Lake Ozonia Outlet
- Lansing Kill
- Ley Creek
- Lidell Creek
- Little Ausable River
- Little Black Creek
- Little Chazy River
- Little Delaware River
- Little Genesee Creek
- Little Hoosic River
- Little River (Fish Creek tributary)
- Little River (Grass River tributary)
- Little River (Mad River tributary)
- Little River (Oswegatchie River tributary)
- Little River (Peconic River tributary)
- Little Salmon River (Lake Ontario)
- Little Salmon River (St. Lawrence River tributary)
- Little Sixmile Creek (Grand Island, New York)
- Little Snake Creek
- Little Trout River
- Little Valley Creek
- Little Wappinger Creek
- Little West Kill
- Little Woodhull Creek
- Long Pond Outlet
- Loyal Creek
- Mad River (Fish Creek tributary)
- Mad River (Salmon River tributary)
- Mahwah River
- Mamaroneck River
- Mansfield Creek
- Marble River
- Marion River
- Meads Creek
- Melzingah Brook
- Merrill Creek
- Mettawee River
- Miami River
- Mianus River
- Middle Branch Grass River
- Middle Branch Moose River
- Middle Branch Oswegatchie River
- Middle Mongaup River
- Mill Brook
- Mill Creek (Hudson River tributary)
- Mill Creek (Lake Ontario)
- Mill Creek (Owasco Inlet)
- Mill River (Long Island)
- Mill River (Rippowam River tributary)
- Mill River (Swamp River tributary)
- Mineral Spring Brook
- Minerva Stream
- Mohawk River
- Mongaup River
- Moodna Creek
- Moordener Kill
- Moose Creek (Raquette River tributary)
- Moose Creek (Sugar River tributary)
- Moose River
- Moses Kill
- Mosher Brook
- Moyer Creek
- Mud Creek (Cohocton River tributary)
- Mud Creek (Otselic River tributary)
- Muddy Kill
- Mudlick Creek
- Muitzes Kill
- Mullet Creek
- Muscoot River
- Muskrat Pond Outlet
- Nanticoke Creek
- Neversink River
- Newcomb River
- Newtown Creek in New York City
- Newtown Creek (Chemung River tributary)
- Niagara River
- Ninemile Creek (Lake Ontario tributary)
- Ninemile Creek (Mohawk River tributary)
- Ninemile Creek (Onondaga Lake tributary)
- Nissequogue River
- Normans Kill
- North Branch Boquet River
- North Branch Callicoon Creek
- North Branch Grass River
- North Branch Great Chazy River
- North Branch Little Salmon River
- North Branch Moose River
- North Branch Salmon River
- North Branch Sandy Creek
- North Branch Saranac River
- North Branch Tuscarora Creek
- North Chuctanunda Creek
- North Creek
- North Fork Cowanesque River
- North River (the lower Hudson River)
- Northwest Bay Brook
- Nowadaga Creek
- Oak Orchard Creek
- Oaks Creek
- Oatka Creek
- Ohisa Creek
- Oil Creek
- Olean Creek
- Oneida Creek
- Oneida River
- Onesquethaw Creek
- Onion River
- Onondaga Creek
- Onondaga Lake Outlet
- Opalescent River
- Oriskany Creek
- Osgood River
- Oswayo Creek
- Oswegatchie River
- Oswego River
- Otego Creek
- Otis Creek
- Otselic River
- Otsquago Creek
- Otsquene Creek
- Otstungo Creek
- Otter Brook
- Otter Creek (Black River tributary)
- Otter Creek (Indian River tributary)
- Otter Kill
- Ouleout Creek
- Owasco Inlet
- Owasco Outlet
- Owego Creek
- Page Brook
- Palmer Creek
- Patchogue River
- Patterson Brook
- Paul Creek
- Peconic River
- Peekskill Hollow Creek
- Perch River
- Phelps Creek
- Phillipin Kill
- Phinney Creek
- Pike Creek
- Pine Creek
- Pipe Creek
- Piseco Outlet
- Plattekill Creek
- Platte Kill
- Pocantico River
- Pochuck Creek
- Poesten Kill
- Point Rock Creek
- Popolopen Creek
- Post Creek
- Potic Creek
- Poultney River
- Plum Brook
- Purdy Creek
- Quacken Kill
- Quassaick Creek
- Ramapo River
- Raquette River
- Red House Brook
- Red River
- Richmond Creek
- Ringwood River
- Rippowam River
- Roaring Brook
- Robinson River
- Rock River
- Roeliff-Jansen Kill
- Rondout Creek
- Round Lake Stream
- Rush Creek
- Sacandaga River
- Saddle River
- Saint Lawrence River
- Saint Regis River
- Salmon Creek (Cayuga Lake)
- Salmon Creek (Lake Ontario)
- Salmon River (Lake Champlain)
- Salmon River (New York)
- Salmon River (Raquette River tributary)
- Salmon River (St. Lawrence River tributary)
- Sandusky River (Seneca River tributary)
- Sandy Creek (Jefferson County, New York)
- Sandy Creek (Monroe County, New York)
- Sangerfield River
- Saranac River
- Sauquoit Creek
- Saw Kill
- Saw Kill (Esopus Creek tributary)
- Saw Mill River
- Sawyer Kill
- Scajaquada Creek
- Schenevus Creek
- Schodack Creek
- Schoharie Creek
- Schroon River
- Schuyler Creek
- Scriba Creek
- Seeley Creek
- Seneca River
- Shawangunk Kill
- Shekomeko Creek
- Sheldrake River
- Sheldrake Stream
- Silvermine River
- Sing Sing Brook
- Sixmile Creek
- Slocum Creek
- Snake Creek
- Snook Kill
- South Branch Cattaraugus Creek
- South Branch Eighteenmile Creek
- South Branch Grass River
- South Branch Moose River
- South Branch West Canada Creek
- South Chuctanunda Creek
- South Creek
- South Inlet (Raquette Lake)
- South Sandy Creek
- Sparkill Creek
- Speonk River
- Spicer Creek (Grand Island, New York)
- Sprite Creek
- Sprout Creek
- Spruce Creek
- Steele Creek
- Sterling Creek
- Stillwater Creek
- Stone Hill River
- Stony Brook (St. Regis River tributary)
- Stony Clove Creek
- Stony Creek (Hudson River tributary)
- Stony Creek (Lake Ontario)
- Stony Kill
- Sturdevant Creek
- Sucker Brook
- Sugar River
- Susquehanna River
- Swamp River
- Swan River
- Switz Kill
- Tackawasick Creek
- Taghkanic Creek
- Tanner Creek (Grass River tributary)
- Taughannock Creek
- Tenmile Creek (Catskill Creek tributary)
- Tenmile River (Delaware River tributary)
- Tenmile River (Housatonic River tributary)
- The Branch
- Tioga River
- Tioughnioga River
- Titicus River
- Tomhannock Creek
- Tonawanda Creek
- Treadwell Creek
- Tremper Kill
- Troups Creek
- Trout Brook (Deer River tributary)
- Trout Brook (Raquette River tributary)
- Trout Brook (Schroon River tributary)
- Trout Brook (St. Regis River tributary)
- Trout River
- Trumansburg Creek
- Tunungwant Creek
- Tuscarora Creek
- Twentymile Creek
- Two Mile Creek
- Unadilla River
- Valatie Kill
- Van Campen Creek
- Vandermark Creek
- Virgil Creek
- Vloman Kill
- Waccabuc River
- Wading River
- Wallkill River
- Walloomsac River
- Wampus River
- Wappasening Creek
- Wappinger Creek
- Webatuck Creek
- West Branch Ausable River
- West Branch Cazenovia Creek
- West Branch Croton River
- West Branch Deer River (Black River tributary)
- West Branch Deer River (St. Regis River tributary)
- West Branch Delaware River
- West Branch Mongaup River
- West Branch Neversink River
- West Branch Oswegatchie River
- West Branch Owego Creek
- West Branch Sacandaga River
- West Branch St. Regis River
- West Branch Tioughnioga River
- West Canada Creek
- West Creek (Cobleskill Creek tributary)
- West Creek (Indian River tributary)
- West Kill
- West River
- West Stony Creek
- Westchester Creek
- Wharton Creek
- White River
- Willowemoc Creek
- Willseyville Creek
- Windfall Brook
- Wiscoy Creek
- Whortlekill Creek
- Wood Creek
- Woodhull Creek
- Woodland Creek
- Woods Creek (Grand Island, New York)
- Wrights Creek
- Wylie Brook
- Wynants Kill
- Wyomanock Creek

== See also ==
- List of waterways
- List of canals in the United States
- List of rivers of the United States
