= Tracy Brook (Little River tributary) =

Location
- Country: United States
- State: New York

Physical characteristics
- Mouth: Little River
  - location: Canton, New York
  - coordinates: 44°35′09″N 75°08′35″W
  - elevation: 351 ft (107 m)
- Basin size: 14.7 mi^{2} (38 km^{2})

Tracy Brook flows into the Little River in Canton, New York.
