= Jackson Creek =

Jackson Creek may refer to:

In Australia

- Jackson Creek (Victoria), a watercourse of the Port Phillip catchment in Victoria

In Canada

- Jackson Creek (Alberta)
- Jackson Creek (Toronto)
- Jackson Creek (Peterborough, Ontario)

In the United States

- Jackson Creek, in Oregon
- Jackson Creek (Dry Creek), in California
- Jackson Creek (Monroe County, Indiana), in Indiana
- Jackson Creek (Sprout Creek), in New York
- Jackson Creek (Uwharrie River tributary), a stream in Randolph County, North Carolina
- Little Swatara Creek, once known as Jackson Creek, in Pennsylvania
