= Oswayo =

Oswayo may refer to:

- Oswayo, Pennsylvania
- Oswayo Township, Pennsylvania
- Oswayo Creek
