= Wiscoy =

Wiscoy may refer to:

- Wiscoy Township, Winona County, Minnesota
- Wiscoy Creek, a stream in New York
- Wiscoy, New York, a hamlet in Hume, New York
