= Kisco =

Kisco may refer to:

- Kisco River, a creek in New York
- Mount Kisco, New York, a community in Westchester County
- Kisco Senior Living, in Carlsbad, California
