= Sawyer Kill =

Location
- Country: United States
- State: New York
- Region: Hudson Valley
- County: Ulster
- Towns: Saugerties, New York,

Physical characteristics
- Source: Great Vly
  - location: Cementon, New York
  - coordinates: 42°08′21″N 73°56′38″W
- Mouth: Hudson River at Saugerties, New York
  - location: Saugerties, New York
  - coordinates: 42°04′52″N 73°56′17″W
  - elevation: 0 ft (0 m)

Basin features
- River system: Hudson River

The Sawyer Kill or Sawyer's Kill is a 7.0-mile-long (11.3 km) tributary stream of the Hudson River in New York state. The source is at the Great Vlaie on the border of Ulster and Greene counties. The stream enters the Hudson River at Seamon Park in Malden, New York, just north of the village of Saugerties.

Saugerties takes its name from the Dutch, "Saugerje's Kill" or "Little Sawyer's creek".

== See also ==
- List of rivers of New York
