= Harrison Creek =

Location
- Country: United States
- State: New York

Physical characteristics
- Mouth: Grass River
  - location: Pyrites, New York
  - coordinates: 44°31′52″N 75°12′00″W
  - elevation: 351 ft (107 m)
- Basin size: 84.5 mi^{2} (219 km^{2})

The Harrison Creek flows into the Grass River in Pyrites, New York.
