= Mahwah River =

River in the United States

Coordinates: 41.094359°N 74.169216°W

The Mahwah River is a tributary of the Ramapo River in Rockland County, New York and Bergen County, New Jersey in the United States.

The Mahwah River runs on a meandering SSW course for about 11 mi (18 km) from its headwaters just north of the hamlet of Ladentown, New York to its mouth which empties into the Ramapo River in Mahwah, New Jersey, just south of the village of Suffern, New York, and the state line. Its course runs along the length of the Ramapo geologic fault on the eastern edge of Harriman State Park and below the face of the Ramapo Mountain escarpment. Numerous brooks and streams flowing out of the Ramapo Mountains to the west feed the river as it runs south. For most of its length the river's course is roughly paralleled by U.S. Route 202.

== Course ==
Just south of its source at the foot of Lime Kiln Mountain, the Mahwah passes through the Ladentown Swamp, an extensive wetland area that is one of the last unspoiled aquifers in Rockland County, New York. As it runs south, the river's course is interrupted by numerous dams forming ponds and small lakes. At a number of points, it runs through woodlands and remains in its original natural condition.

Approximately 4.5 mi (7.2 km) south of its source the river passes under Sky Meadow Lane and shortly thereafter enters a stretch where it is surrounded by Harriman State Park on both sides. Just south of this the river passes through Kakiat County Park and just beyond the park it passes under Route 202 from west to east.

Farther south the river enters Antrim Lake and immediately thereafter it passes under the New York State Thruway, flows through Suffern, south across the state boundary and into the Ramapo River in the town of Mahwah.

== Wildlife species ==
The Mahwah harbors a population of fish species, including brook trout, brown trout, largemouth bass, pickerel, catfish, bluegills, suckers, and chubbs. It also hosts waterfowl species, including wood duck in its northern reaches, mallards and Canada geese throughout its length. Muskrats, beavers and an occasional otter are seen plying its waters as well. Pileated woodpeckers, wild turkey, whitetailed deer, black bear and coyotes are common in the surrounding woodlands and mountains.

== Flooding ==
In the Squires Gate section of Suffern there have been significant episodes of flooding during heavy rainfall. There is debate among local politicians and citizens over the best way to remediate the problem.

== Overdevelopment concerns ==
Recent down-zoning ordinances pushed by local politicians, which allow for high density development in the vicinity of the river, have tripped off a firestorm of protest by local citizens and precipitated the creation of community action groups dedicated to protecting the Mahwah and its watershed against overdevelopment.

== See also ==
- List of New Jersey rivers
- List of New York rivers
