= East Sidney Lake =

- Location of East Sidney Lake within New York
- Location: Delaware County, New York
- Coordinates: 42°19′38″N 75°12′45″W
- Type: Reservoir
- Primary inflows: Ouleout Creek
- Primary outflows: Ouleout Creek
- Surface area: 201 acres (0.314 mi^{2})
- Surface elevation: 1,148 feet (350 m)
- Settlements: Unadilla

East Sidney Lake is a small reservoir located east of Unadilla in Delaware County, New York. The Ouleout Creek flows through East Sidney Lake.

== See also ==
- List of lakes in New York
