= Mexico Point State Park =

State park in Oswego County, New York

- Location within New York
- Type: State park
- Location: 120 Mexico Point Drive W. Mexico, New York
- Nearest city: Oswego, New York
- Coordinates: 43°31′29″N 76°15′16″W
- Area: 122 acres (0.49 km^{2})
- Operator: Town of Mexico; New York State Office of Parks, Recreation and Historic Preservation
- Open: All year
- Website: Mexico Point Park

Mexico Point State Park is a 122-acre (0.49 km^{2}) park on the eastern shore of Lake Ontario in the town of Mexico in Oswego County, New York. The park is located at the mouth of the Little Salmon River.

== History ==
The property that was to become Mexico Point State Park previously featured summer resorts as early as the mid-1800s, including the Mexico Point Club that existed at the property from the early 1900s through the 1950s. During the 1940s and early 1950s, professional boxing champions Carmen Basilio and Joey DeJohn utilized the property as a summer training camp.

The property was acquired by the New York State Office of Parks, Recreation and Historic Preservation in the early 1960s, and remained undeveloped for many years. However, since 1992 the park has been developed and operated by the Town of Mexico after local residents encouraged the town to enter into a long-term lease of the property with New York State. The state retains ownership of the property.

== Park facilities ==
The park features a swimming beach on Lake Ontario, bathhouse, picnic facilities and nature trails. Casey's Cottage, originally built as horse stables during the park's days as a resort and later remodeled as a medieval-style manor house, is claimed to be the site of paranormal activity. Ghost tours are occasionally held at the cottage.

The state continues to operate the 20-acre (8.1 ha) Mexico Point Boat Launch across the river from the town-operated park, which receives approximately 20,000 visitors annually.

== See also ==
- List of New York state parks
