= Punch Kill =

Location
- Country: United States
- State: New York

Physical characteristics
- Mouth: Cobleskill Creek
  - location: Howes Cave, New York, United States
  - coordinates: 42°41′09″N 74°22′44″W
- Basin size: 2.18 mi^{2} (5.6 km^{2})

Punch Kill starts south of East Cobleskill, New York and flows into the Cobleskill Creek in Howes Cave, New York.
