= Saw Kill (Esopus Creek tributary) =

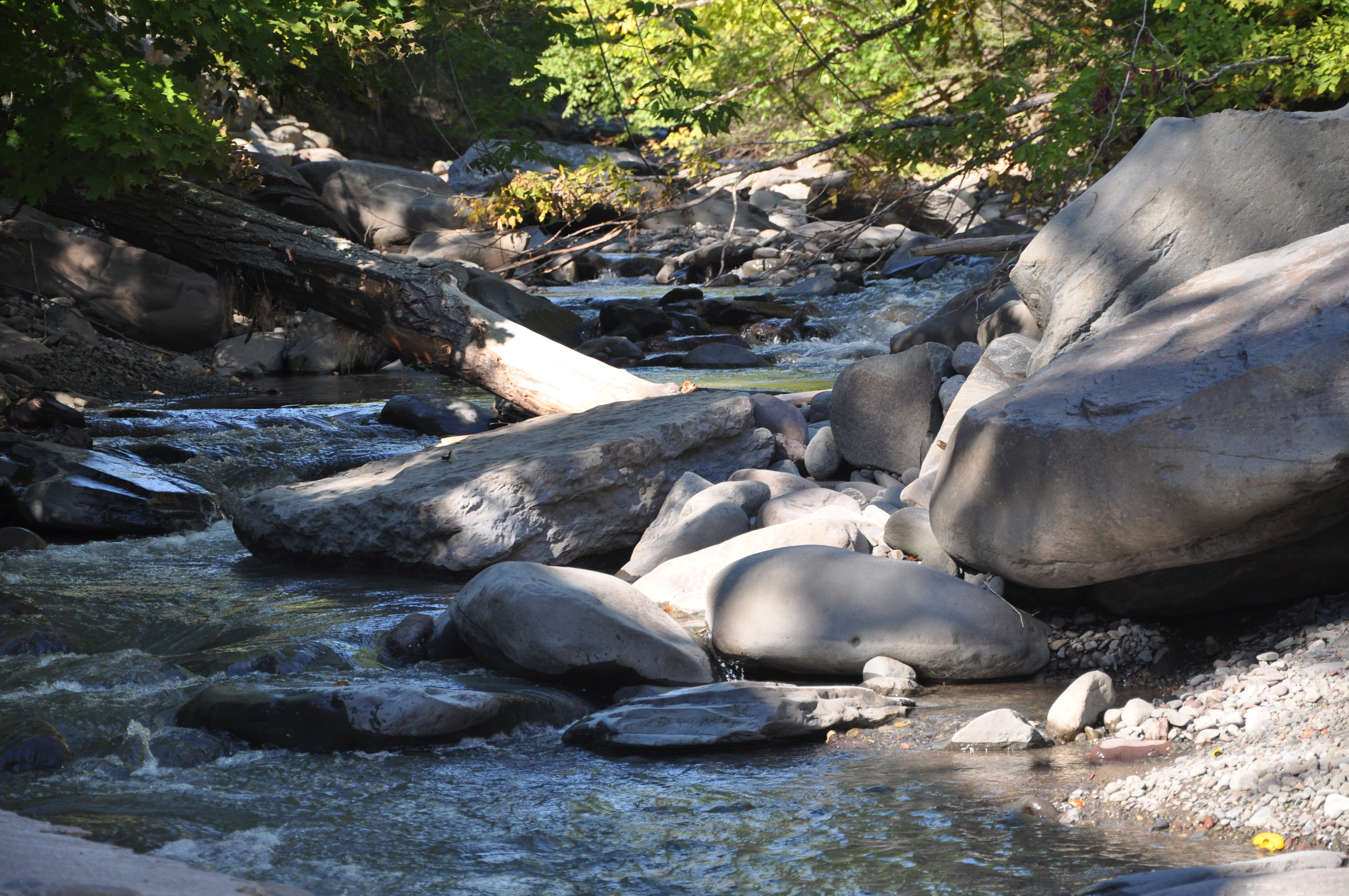
- Saw Kill near Woodstock NY

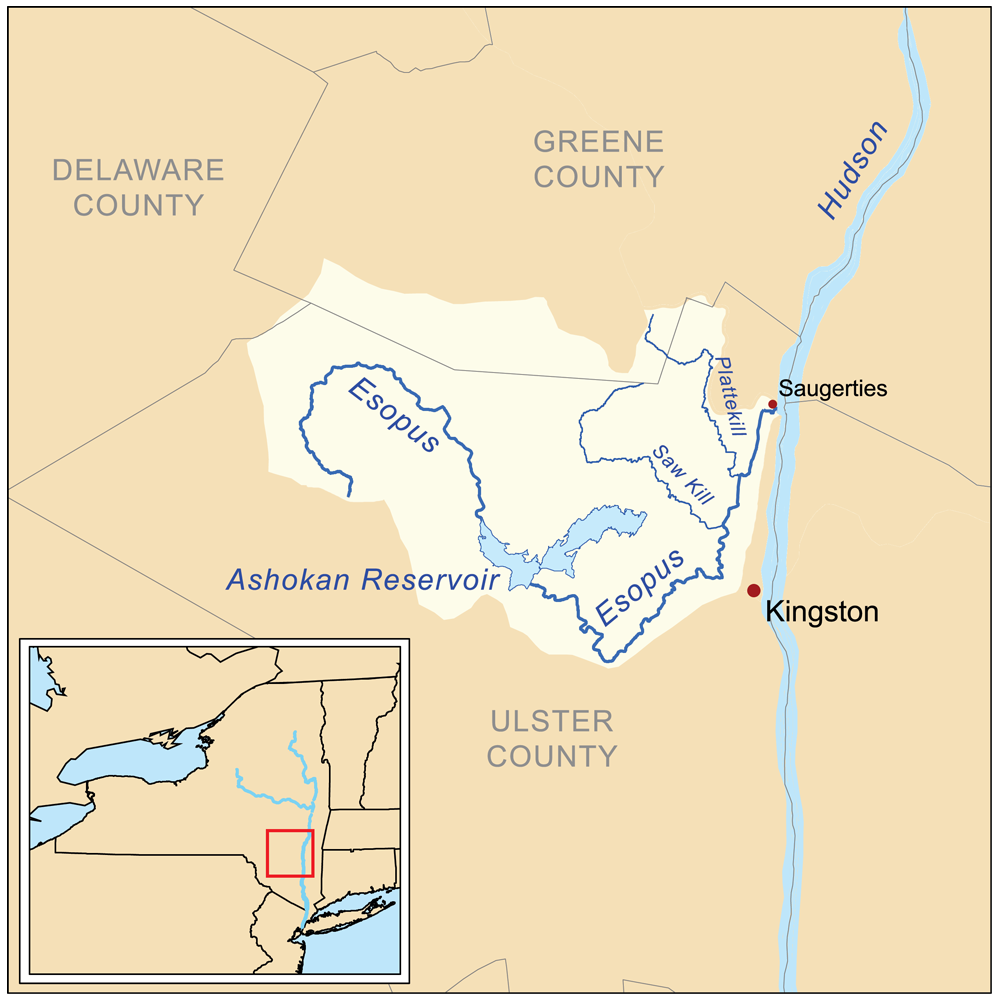
- Map of Esopus Creek and its watershed
- Etymology: Local Lenape tribe

Location
- Country: United States
- State: New York
- Regions: Catskills, Hudson Valley
- County: Ulster

Physical characteristics
- Source
  - coordinates: 42°05′48″N 74°05′33″W
- Mouth: Esopus Creek
  - location: By Kingston
  - coordinates: 41°58′52″N 74°00′29″W
  - elevation: 121 ft (37 m)

Saw Kill is a 19.7-mile-long (31.7 km) main tributary that drains into Esopus Creek on the Hudson’s west bank.

== Geography ==
Saw Kill tributary is located in Ulster County. 19.7 miles (31.7 km) long, it rises in Forest Preserve lands on the lower slopes of Indian Head Mountain and, after flowing through the town of Woodstock, empties into the Esopus just above Saugerties; just north of Route 209 and just downstream of Ulster Town Hall. The Saw Kill is one of the major tributaries to the Esopus. There is a sedimentary delta halfway across the Esopus Creek channel in this area, which indicates high sediment loads in the Saw Kill.

Saw Kill drains are mostly forested watershed. The watershed also contains some wetland areas.

== History ==
On January 1, 1765, William Legg bought around 100 acres of land lying on both sides of the Saw Kill for 50 schipples of wheat. This was one of the first purchases to be made in the present town of Kingston. Legg built a sawmill and a house. The contract also required him to pay half a bushel of wheat every year to the trustees who he bought the land from. The Legg family lived there for 88 years. It was reported that they ground wheat in the mill for the Continental Army.

The next owner was James Gaddis. He continued the milling operations and denied requests of people to use the land for quarrying. However, in the 1880s a fire destroyed both the house and the mill. Gaddis, needing money to rebuild, gave permission for quarrying bluestone on the Saw Mill creek ledge. The extensive quarrying moved the falls that were located by the mill back 300 feet.

Howe’s Mill was another mill located on the Saw Kill. It powered by a dam at Little Falls. The mill was used to make gunpowder and there were frequently explosions. The mill stayed mostly intact, however, and continued operating until the 1860s when it was hit by lightning.

Bluestone quarrying in the area increased in 1828 when the Delaware and Hudson Canals were being built. Quarry owners hired unskilled immigrant laborers and built houses for them in the area. This led to the creation of small, distinct, immigrant communities. Many of the houses built during this time are still standing.

In the 1900s railroads helped spur tourism in the region. During the summers, many farmers would take in boarders from the city. The scenic beauty and good trout fishing in the Saw Kill and other similar creeks is part of what attracted people to the area.

With the growth of suburban life in America, suburban communities developed in Sweat Meadows along the Saw Kill creek. Flooding in the creek then became an issue for these communities. Residents organized a clean-out of the creek in 1981. This did not solve the problem and flooding continues to happen during heavy rains.

== Ecosystems ==
The Saw Kill provides an important habitat for various species. Opposite the place where the Saw Kill joins the Esopus are alluvial flats with flood-plain pools, which used to be sand or gravel pits. They now provide an important habitat for frogs, including the Northern Leopard Frog (which is rare in the region). Other organisms such as dragonflies and small fish provide the basis for a thriving ecosystem in the area. Bald eagles can be seen flying over the Saw Kill and nesting in tall trees nearby.

== Water quality ==
There have been some water quality issues in the Saw Kill (west). High bacteria counts have been found in tests taken near Lake Katrine. The bacteria levels are worse during times of heavy rainfall.

== Recreation ==
The Saw Kill contains whitewater rapids for rafting and kayaking, in addition to swimming holes. The Saw Kill also attracts fishers.

== See also ==
- List of rivers of New York
