= Knapp Brook (Ouleout Creek tributary) =

- Location of the mouth of Knapp Brook

Location
- Country: United States
- State: New York
- County: Delaware

Physical characteristics
- Source
  - coordinates: 42°24′33″N 75°01′13″W
- Mouth: Ouleout Creek
  - coordinates: 42°23′26″N 75°02′03″W
  - elevation: 1,437 ft (438 m)

Knapp Brook is a river in Delaware County, New York. It flows into the Ouleout Creek east of North Franklin.
