= Roaring Brook (Treadwell Creek tributary) =

- Location of the mouth of Roaring Brook

Location
- Country: United States
- State: New York
- County: Delaware

Physical characteristics
- Source
  - coordinates: 42°20′42″N 75°03′14″W
- Mouth: Ouleout Creek
  - coordinates: 42°20′42″N 75°03′14″W
  - elevation: 1,480 ft (450 m)

Roaring Brook is a river in Delaware County, New York. It flows into the Ouleout Creek in Treadwell.
