= Snake Creek (Susquehanna River tributary) =

Creek in Pennsylvania, United States

Coordinates: 42°01′06″N 75°47′11″W

Snake Creek (sometimes known as Big Snake Creek) is a 17.0-mile-long (27.4 km) tributary of the Susquehanna River flowing from the Mouth of Lake Montrose in Montrose, Susquehanna County, Pennsylvania, and Broome County, New York, in the United States.

Snake Creek joins the Susquehanna at Corbettsville, New York. There is a much smaller stream known as Little Snake Creek, which joins the Susquehanna north of (downstream of) Snake Creek.

In the early 19th century, Snake Creek was the site of a sawmill run by Cooper Corbett.

== See also ==
- List of rivers of New York
- List of rivers of Pennsylvania
