= Jan De Bakkers Kill =

Stream in the U.S. state of New York

Coordinates: 42°19′00″N 73°59′19″W

Jan de Bakker's Kill (pronounced yon-de-bocker) is a 7.1-mile-long (11.4 km) tributary of Catskill Creek, part of the Hudson River watershed, in the Catskill Mountains of New York.

Its name derives from the Dutch and means "John the Baker's Creek," Jan de Bakker being the name or title of several generations of local native leaders in the late 17th through mid 18th centuries.

== See also ==
- List of rivers of New York
