= Little Salmon River (Lake Ontario) =

- Location of the mouth of the Little Salmon River in New York State Little Salmon River (Lake Ontario) (the United States)

Location
- Country: United States
- State: New York
- County: Oswego County

Physical characteristics
- Source: North Branch Little Salmon R.
  - location: Town of Albion
  - coordinates: 43°28′08″N 75°58′32″W
- 2nd source: South Branch Little Salmon R.
  - location: Town of Amboy
  - coordinates: 43°22′26″N 75°56′47″W
- Source confluence
  - location: Town of Mexico
  - coordinates: 43°24′07″N 76°09′21″W
- Mouth: Lake Ontario
  - location: Town of Mexico
  - coordinates: 43°31′27″N 76°15′31″W
- Basin size: 85 sq mi (220 km^{2})

Basin features
- Tributaries
  - left: North Branch Little Salmon R.
  - right: South Branch Little Salmon R.

The Little Salmon River is a tributary of Lake Ontario located in Oswego County, New York. The river enters Lake Ontario approximately four miles (6.4 km) southwest from the mouth of the Salmon River.

The river was known by the Iroquois as Cas-son-ta-che-go-na, translated as "river of great bark" or "large pieces of bark lying down, ready for building". In addition to its current name, the stream was historically known as Salmon Creek or Little Salmon Creek. The current name was officially adopted by the United States Board on Geographic Names in 1905.

== Course ==
The Little Salmon River drains an approximately 85-square-mile (220 km^{2}) watershed, which is primarily agricultural and residential in nature.

The headwaters of the north branch of the Little Salmon River begin in Happy Valley Wildlife Management Area. The confluence of the north and south branches of the Little Salmon River is in the eastern part of the town of Mexico, west of the village of Parish. From there, the river flows northwest through the village of Mexico and the hamlet of Texas before emptying into Lake Ontario at Mexico Point State Park.

== Sportfishing ==
The lower Little Salmon River provides habitat for a variety of resident fish species, including brown bullhead, white suckers, rock bass, largemouth bass, and northern pike. In addition, several lake-dwelling species enter the Little Salmon River during annual spawning runs in the fall, including Chinook salmon, coho salmon, steelhead, and brown trout. The river was last stocked by the New York State Department of Environmental Conservation in 2019. A total of 4,380 four-inch-long steelhead were stocked at the Village of Mexico in April, 2019.

The majority of the river is privately owned, and fishing access to the river is limited to Mexico Point State Park and the Mexico Point Boat Launch, both located near the mouth of the Little Salmon River.

== Dam Removal ==
There are eighteen dams in the Little Salmon River watershed. These dams are currently impacting fish passage through the river system. The Youngs Mill Dam on Black Creek, a tributary of the Little Salmon River, is owned by the Mexico School District and was removed in the summer of 2024. The dam was replaced with a series of step pools and a sea lamprey barrier to allow fish passage to the upper reaches of Black Creek. Salmon were seen migrating past the former dam site in the fall of that same year.

A second dam, owned by the Village of Mexico, has experienced structural failure in the past and is scheduled to be removed. The Engineers Without Borders club at Syracuse University is assisting in dam removal design.

== See also ==
- List of rivers of New York
