= Vloman Kill =

Vloman Kill Vlomans Kill, Vlomans Creek
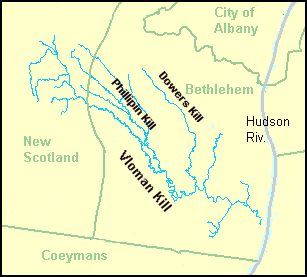
- Vloman Kill in Albany County, New York

Location
- Country: United States
- State: New York
- County: Albany
- Towns: , New Scotland, New York, Bethlehem, New York

Physical characteristics
- Source
  - location: Voorheesville, New Scotland, New York
  - coordinates: 42°38′31″N 73°54′38″W
- Mouth: Hudson River
  - location: Cedar Hill, Bethlehem, New York
  - coordinates: 42°32′32″N 73°45′34″W
  - elevation: 0 ft (0 m)

The Vloman Kill is an 18.5-mile-long (29.8 km) tributary to the Hudson River in Albany County, New York, in the United States. Its source is in the town of New Scotland near the village of Voorheesville, and its mouth is at the Hudson River near the hamlet of Cedar Hill, in the town of Bethlehem.

The Vloman Kill has a drainage area of approximately 30 square miles (78 km^{2}).

== Tributaries ==
- Phillipin Kill
- Dowers Kill

== See also ==
- List of rivers of New York
