= Moordener Kill =

River in the United States of America

Location
- Country: United States
- State: New York
- County: Rensselaer
- Towns: Sand Lake, Schodack

Physical characteristics
- Source
  - location: Sand Lake, New York
  - coordinates: 42°36′21″N 73°35′10″W
- Mouth: Hudson River
  - location: Castleton-on-Hudson, New York
  - coordinates: 42°32′36″N 73°45′14″W
  - elevation: 0 ft (0 m)

The Moordener Kill is a 15.5-mile-long (24.9 km) tributary to the Hudson River that flows through southwestern Rensselaer County, New York, in the United States.

Moordener Kill translates to "Murderer Creek", with moordenaar being the modern Dutch word for "murderer" and kill for "creek". The name comes from the creek having been the site of an ambush of Dutch settlers by Native Americans in 1643 in which seven men and two women were killed.

== See also ==
- List of rivers of New York
- Kieft's War
