= Twentymile Creek (Lake Erie tributary) =

Stream in Pennsylvania, USA

Twentymile Creek Tributary to Lake Erie
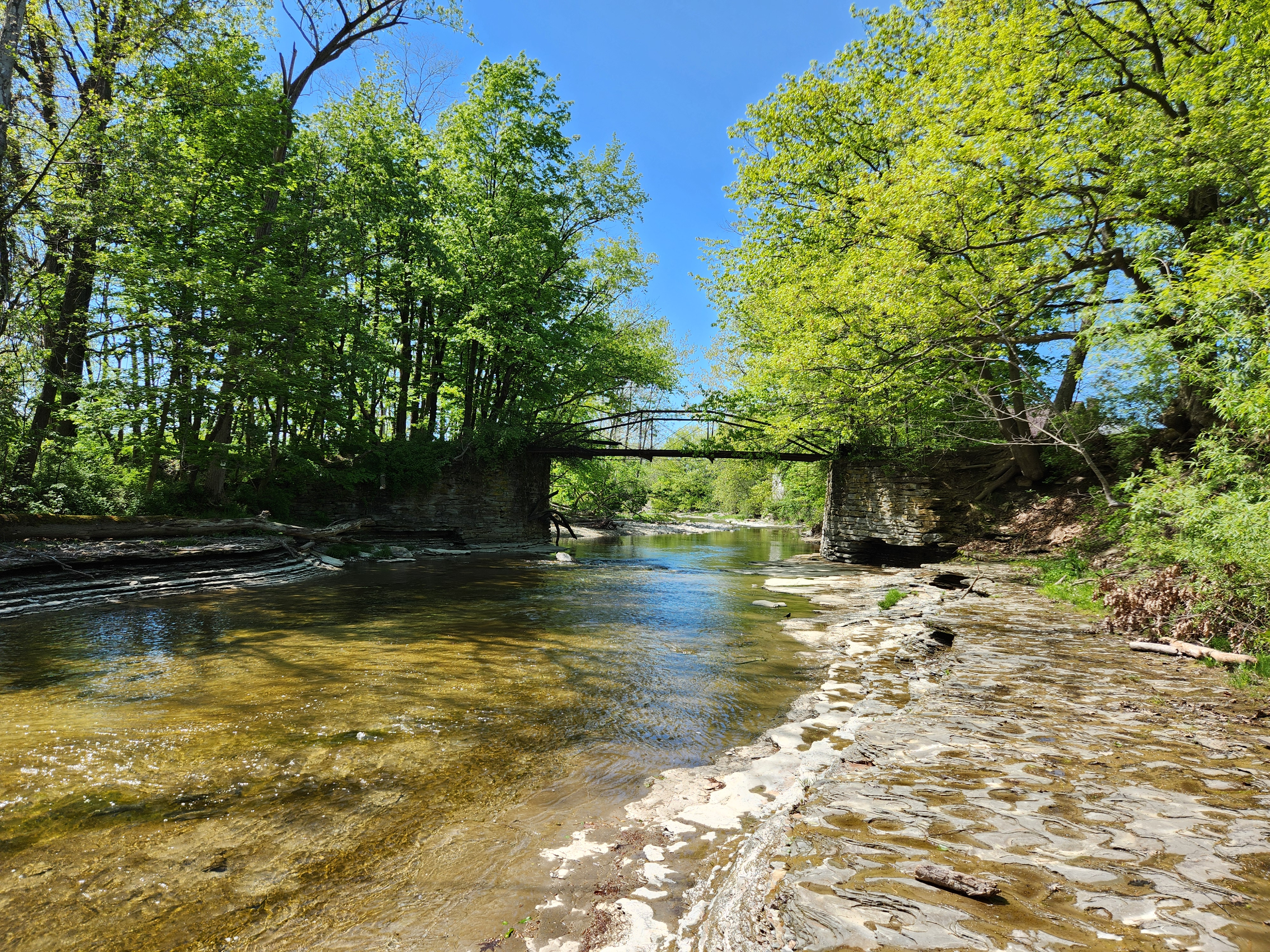
- Twentymile Creek and an abandoned bridge near Route 5 in Pennsylvania.

- Location of Twentymile Creek mouth Twentymile Creek (Lake Erie tributary) (the United States)

Location
- Country: United States
- State: Pennsylvania; New York
- Counties: Erie (PA); Chautauqua (NY)

Physical characteristics
- Source: divide between Twentymile Creek and Chautauqua Creek
  - location: about 3 miles northeast of Sheldon Corners, NY
  - coordinates: 42°12′53″N 079°38′33″W
  - elevation: 1,580 ft (480 m)
- Mouth: Lake Erie
  - location: about 4 miles northeast of Northeast, Pennsylvania near Orchard Beach
  - coordinates: 42°15′47″N 079°47′04″W
  - elevation: 574 ft (175 m)
- Length: 17.75 mi (28.57 km)
- Basin size: 34.81 square miles (90.2 km^{2})
- Discharge
  - location: Lake Erie
  - average: 76.99 cu ft/s (2.180 m^{3}/s) at mouth with Lake Erie

Basin features
- Progression: northwest
- River system: Lake Erie
- Tributaries
  - left: unnamed tributaries
  - right: Belson Creek

Twentymile Creek is a tributary of Lake Erie in Chautauqua County, New York and Erie County, Pennsylvania in the United States.

Twentymile Creek joins Lake Erie near the community of Orchard Beach, Pennsylvania.

Twentymile Creek is considered the largest stream in the eastern portion of Erie County. It is stocked annually with steelhead and trout by the Pennsylvania Fish Commission. Twentymile Creek is an approved trout water, so its fishing can be good throughout the year. Steelhead run into Twentymile all the way to New York, but not many anglers venture up that far to fish. New York State has undertaken efforts to stock brown trout in the upper reaches of Twentymile as well. The brown trout migrate out into Lake Erie and return to spawn. Access points along Route 20 are posted.

== See also ==
- List of rivers of New York
- List of rivers of Pennsylvania
