= Treadwell Creek =

- Location of the mouth of Treadwell Creek

Location
- Country: United States
- State: New York
- County: Delaware

Physical characteristics
- Source
  - coordinates: 42°20′43″N 74°56′51″W
- Mouth: Ouleout Creek
  - coordinates: 42°22′00″N 75°07′47″W
  - elevation: 1,220 ft (370 m)

Basin features
- Tributaries
  - left: Roaring Brook

Treadwell Creek is a river in Delaware County, New York. It flows into the Ouleout Creek north of Leonta.
