= Gay Creek =

- Location of the mouth of Gay Creek

Location
- Country: United States
- State: New York
- County: Delaware

Physical characteristics
- Source
  - coordinates: 42°24′48″N 75°03′05″W
- Mouth: Ouleout Creek
  - coordinates: 42°23′22″N 75°03′48″W
  - elevation: 1,352 ft (412 m)

Gay Creek is a river in Delaware County, New York. It flows into the Ouleout Creek east of North Franklin.
