= Titicus =

Titicus may refer to:

- Titicus River, a tributary of the Croton River in New York and Connecticut

Connecticut:

- Titicus, Connecticut
- Titicus Mountain

New York:

- Titicus Reservoir, Westchester County
- New York State Route 116, a section of which is known as Titicus Road
