= Potic Creek =

River in New York, United States

Coordinates: 42°16′0″N 73°54′53″W

Potic Creek is a 10.1-mile-long (16.3 km) tributary to Catskill Creek in the Catskill Mountains of New York. The name comes from the Mahican for a waterfall, originally referring to the falls in the Catskill near Wolcott Mills. Potic also originally referred to the name of the American Indian village below the falls and also of the commanding hill north of the falls.

== See also ==
- List of rivers of New York
