= Paul Creek =

Location
- Country: United States
- State: New York

Physical characteristics
- Mouth: Sacandaga River
  - location: Day Center, New York
  - coordinates: 43°18′40″N 74°00′44″W
  - elevation: 782 ft (238 m)

Paul Creek flows into the Sacandaga River in Day Center, New York.
