= Birch Creek (Esopus Creek tributary) =

- Location of the mouth of Birch Creek Birch Creek (Esopus Creek tributary) (the United States)

Location
- Country: United States
- State: New York
- Region: Catskill Mountains
- Counties: Ulster, Greene

Physical characteristics
- Source
  - coordinates: 42°10′27″N 74°26′34″W
- Mouth: Esopus Creek
  - location: Big Indian
  - coordinates: 42°06′18″N 74°26′33″W
  - elevation: 1,181 ft (360 m)
- Basin size: 12.6 square miles (33 km^{2})
- Discharge
  - location: Big Indian
  - minimum: 1.6 cu ft/s (0.045 m^{3}/s)
  - maximum: 1,460 cu ft/s (41 m^{3}/s)

Basin features
- Tributaries
  - left: Cathedral Brook, Giggle Hollow
  - right: Rose Mountain Brook, Rochester Hollow

Birch Creek flows into Esopus Creek in Big Indian. Most of Belleayre Ski Resort is located within Birch Creek’s watershed, and therefore the runoff from the ski resorts snowpack drains into Birch Creek via Cathedral Brook.

== Hydrology ==
=== Discharge ===
The United States Geological Survey (USGS) has maintained a stream gauge along Birch Creek since October 1998. The gauge is located in Big Indian, .1 miles (0.16 km) upstream from Lasher Road. It had a maximum discharge of 1,460 cubic feet (41 m^{3}) per second on August 28, 2011, as Hurricane Irene passed through the area. It had a minimum discharge of 1.6 cubic feet (0.045 m^{3}) per second on September 26, 2008.
