= Bushnellsville Creek =

- Location of the mouth of Bushnellsville Creek Bushnellsville Creek (the United States)

Location
- Country: United States
- State: New York
- Region: Catskill Mountains
- Counties: Ulster, Greene

Physical characteristics
- Source
  - coordinates: 42°10′59″N 74°25′55″W
- Mouth: Esopus Creek
  - coordinates: 42°07′13″N 74°23′58″W
  - elevation: 1,050 ft (320 m)

Bushnellsville Creek flows into Esopus Creek.
