= Alplaus Kill =

Location
- Country: United States
- State: New York

Physical characteristics
- Mouth: Mohawk River
  - location: Niskayuna, New York
  - coordinates: 42°51′04″N 73°54′14″W
  - elevation: 210 ft (64 m)
- Basin size: 55.4 mi^{2} (143 km^{2})

Alplaus Kill also called Aalplaats Creek is a river that flows into the Mohawk River in Alplaus, New York.

The name is derived from Dutch, most likely meaning "eel pond".
