= Pyrites, New York =

- Hamlet
- Location within New York Location within the United States
- Coordinates: 44°30′53″N 75°11′09″W
- Country: United States
- State: New York
- County: St. Lawrence
- Elevation: 502 ft (153 m)
- Time zone: UTC-5 (Eastern (EST))
  - Summer (DST): UTC-4 (EDT)
- ZIP code: 13677
- Area codes: 315 & 680
- GNIS feature ID: 976860

Pyrites is a hamlet in St. Lawrence County, New York, United States. The community is located along the Grasse River, 5.7 miles (9.2 km) south of Canton. Pyrites has a post office with ZIP code 13677. Pyrites is also home to the Pyrites Volunteer Fire Department.
