= Kisco River =

Stream in the U.S. state of New York

Coordinates: 41°14′15.34″N 73°45′6.48″W

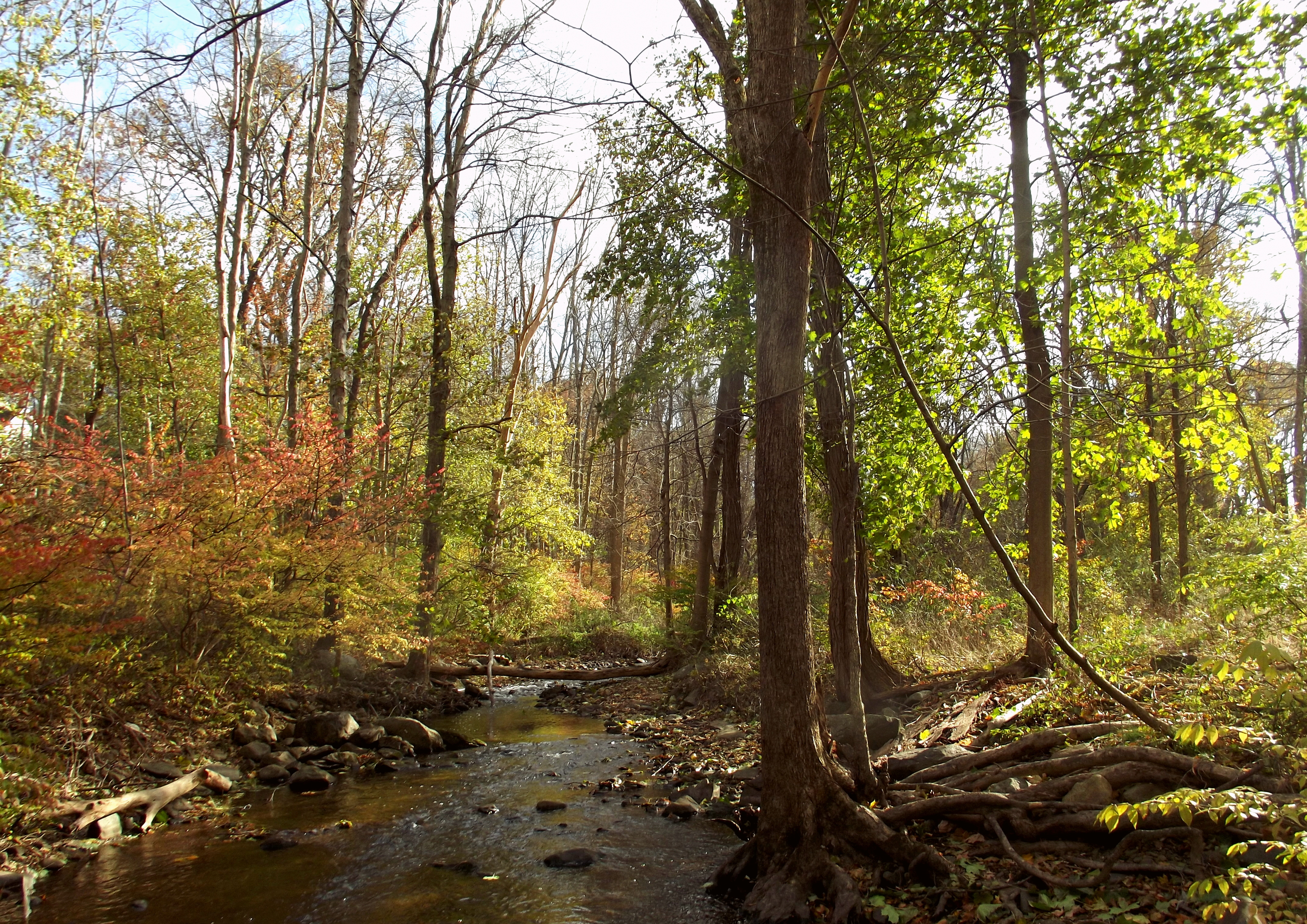
Kisco River along the Early Settler's Trail

The Kisco River is a creek that flows through the Mount Kisco, New York, United States. It is formed by the forks of Chappaqua Brook and an unnamed stream. It follows a 3.3-mile (5.3 km) winding course before emptying into the New Croton Reservoir at Lake Road Bridge in the town of New Castle near the hamlet of Stanwood, and eventually into the Croton Aqueduct for distribution in New York City. Waters overflowing the spillway of the New Croton Dam continue downstream in the Croton River and empty into the Hudson River near Croton Point.

The river’s name is derived from the village of Mount Kisco, which the river flows through. The name of Mount Kisco is further derived from "seesquee", which may also be written as "cisqua", which is the Algonquin word for "muddy place", referring to the marshlands in the area.

== Course description ==
The Kisco River begins at the highlands of Arthur W. Butler Memorial Sanctuary, and travels westward in New Castle until it feeds into Wallace Pond at Leonard Park in Mount Kisco. It then runs along the "Early Settler's Trail", and passes the former location of the Spencer Optical Factory, which is now a nature trail. After this it runs underneath Route 133, then through "Riverwoods", a townhouse complex. It continues past the Bedford Yeshiva Farm Settlement, a small yeshiva. The Riverwoods wastewater treatment plant discharges its wastewater into the river at this point. It then passes underneath Croton Lake Road and empties into the Muscoot Reservoir the reservoir’s widest point (1,100 feet (340 m)).

Several storm drains empty into the river along its course. It runs through a primarily developed wetland area.

== See also ==
- List of rivers of New York
