= Wiscoy Creek =

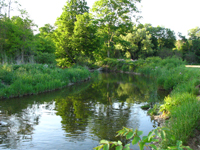
- Wiscoy Creek

- Location of the mouth of the Wiscoy Creek in New York State Wiscoy Creek (the United States)

Location
- Country: United States
- State: New York
- Counties: Wyoming, Allegany
- Cities: Hamlet of Bliss, Village of Pike, Hamlet of Wiscoy

Physical characteristics
- Source
  - location: Town of Eagle, Wyoming County
  - coordinates: 42°32′28″N 78°18′17″W
- 2nd source: North Branch Wiscoy Creek
  - location: Town of Wethersfield, Wyoming County
  - coordinates: 42°36′47″N 78°17′18″W
- Source confluence
  - location: Hamlet of Bliss, Wyoming County
  - coordinates: 42°34′46″N 78°15′04″W
- Mouth: Genesee River
  - location: Town of Hume, Allegany County
  - coordinates: 42°29′55″N 78°03′25″W
- Length: 15 mi (24 km)

Basin features
- Tributaries
  - left: North Branch Wiscoy Creek, Trout Brook, East Koy Creek

Wiscoy Creek is a stream, approximately 15 miles (24 km) long, in western New York in the United States. It is a tributary of the Genesee River. The creek was known to Native Americans as O-wa-is-ki, meaning "under the banks".

== Course ==
The Wiscoy rises in the Town of Eagle in Wyoming County. In the hamlet of Bliss the creek is joined by its North Branch, which flows south from its source in the Town of Wethersfield. From there, the creek flows southeast through the village of Pike, and is joined by East Koy Creek shortly before joining the Genesee River in the town of Hume in northern Allegany County.

== Trout fishing ==
Nursed by cold springs, the water temperature in this stream rarely exceeds 70 °F (21 °C), enabling the Wiscoy to provide good trout fishing all season long. The stream is managed almost exclusively as a wild trout fishery; the only stretch that is stocked is a one-mile (1.6 km) section in Allegany County.

A 2006 New York State Department of Environmental Conservation survey estimated 1,600 adult wild brown trout per stream mile in the Wyoming County section of Wiscoy Creek. The stream typically does not produce large trout due to the high number of fish overall, however a 19-inch (48 cm) fish was reported during the survey. Angler access to the stream is facilitated by 12.5 miles (20.1 km) of public fishing easements, 12 angler footpaths and three angler parking areas. Other areas are open by landowner permission.

== See also ==
- List of rivers of New York
