= Terwilleger Creek =

- Location of the mouth within New York Terwilleger Creek (the United States)

Location
- Country: United States
- State: New York

Physical characteristics
- Mouth: Mohawk River
  - location: Cranesville
  - coordinates: 42°55′00″N 74°09′15″W
  - elevation: 254 ft (77 m)
- Basin size: 5.05 sq mi (13.1 km^{2})

The Terwilleger Creek flows into the Mohawk River in Cranesville.
