= Cobleskill Creek =

River in New York, United States

- Location of the mouth within New York Cobleskill Creek (the United States)

Location
- Country: United States
- State: New York
- Region: Central New York
- Counties: Otsego, Schoharie

Physical characteristics
- Source: Pine Mountain
  - location: West of West Richmondville
  - coordinates: 42°39′02″N 74°38′55″W
- Mouth: Schoharie Creek
  - location: Fort Hunter
  - coordinates: 42°42′40″N 74°19′36″W
  - elevation: 927 ft (283 m)
- Basin size: 139 sq mi (360 km^{2})

Basin features
- Progression: Cobleskill Creek → Schoharie Creek → Mohawk River → Hudson River → Upper New York Bay
- Tributaries
  - left: West Creek
  - right: Punch Kill, Bear Gulch Brook

Cobleskill Creek is a river in Otsego and Schoharie counties in the state of New York. It starts at Pine Mountain west of West Richmondville and flows east-northeast before converging with Schoharie Creek in Central Bridge. The creek flows through the villages of Richmondville and Cobleskill.

== Hydrology ==
The United States Geological Survey (USGS) maintains stream gauges along Cobleskill Creek. The station on South Grand Street, in operation from 1963 to 1965, 1974, 1987 and 2017 to present, is located .4 miles (0.64 km) south of Cobleskill. It had a maximum discharge of 6,570 cubic feet (186 m^{3}) per second on March 5, 1964, and a minimum discharge of 2.09 cubic feet (0.059 m^{3}) per second on July 21, 2018.
