= Fulmer Creek =

Tributary of the Mohawk River

- Location of mouth within New York Fulmer Creek (the United States)

Location
- Country: United States
- State: New York
- Region: Central New York
- County: Herkimer
- Town: German Flatts

Physical characteristics
- Source
  - location: NW of Paines Hollow
  - coordinates: 42°59′06″N 74°54′50″W
  - elevation: 1,302 ft (397 m)
- Mouth: Mohawk River / Erie Canal
  - location: Mohawk
  - coordinates: 43°00′56″N 75°00′46″W
  - elevation: 384 ft (117 m)
- Length: 11.5 mi (18.5 km)
- Basin size: 26.2 sq mi (68 km^{2})
- Discharge
  - location: Mohawk
  - minimum: .56 cubic feet (0.016 m^{3}) per second
  - maximum: 1,450 cubic feet (41 m^{3}) per second

Basin features
- Tributaries
  - left: Rightman Creek, Day Creek, Flat Creek, Ford Creek, Trout Creek
  - right: Hungry Hill Creek

Fulmer Creek is an 11.5-mile-long (18.5 km) river that flows into the Mohawk River in Mohawk, New York. The creek derives its name from the "Fulmer" family (members of the Tryon County militia), who bought land through the Burnetsfield patent of 1725, in which lands on the present village site were granted out.

Fulmer Creek's 26.2-square-mile (68 km^{2}) watershed accounts for .76 percent of the Mohawk River's watershed.

== Course ==
Fulmer creek begins by the junction of Oregon Road and Decker Road on Shoemaker Hill northwest of Paines Hollow, and begins travelling southwest, passing under Shoemaker Hill Road. It soon passes under State Route 168, as it meets Rightman Creek as it turns to the west. Fulmer then continues and soon passes under State Route 168 twice and meets Day Creek from the south, as it passes through the hamlet of Days Rock. The creek then turns to the northwest and crosses under State Route 168 again, then meets Flat Creek from the south. It continues and soon meets Ford Creek from the south, then crosses under State Route 168 three times. Now on the south side of State Route 168, it meets Trout Creek from the south then soon passes under State Route 28, as it enters the village of Mohawk. In the village the creek meets Hungry Hill Creek from the east. Fulmer continues through the village as it passes under West Main Street and then State Route 5S before converging with the Mohawk River / Erie Canal.

== History ==
Pioneers early built a bridge over Fulmer Creek and also a grist mill on the stream. Both bridge and mill were burned in de Belletre's great French-Indian raid and massacre of German Flats on November 12, 1757. All the farm houses and buildings hereabouts were burned during the massacre and the one on April 30, 1758. They were rebuilt only to be again destroyed during the Revolutionary raids of 1778 and 1782.

== Watershed ==
The drainage basin is 54 percent forested with the remainder being a mix of rural residential and agriculture uses in the upper creek, and mostly residential and commercial uses in the lower part of the creek in the village of Mohawk. The Creek has an average slope of 2.1 percent over its entire stream length of 12.7 miles, including a very steep section in the middle part.

== Hydrology ==
=== Discharge ===
The United States Geological Survey (USGS) maintains stream gauges along Fulmer Creek. The gauge, in operation since August 2014, is located 2.7 miles (4.3 km) upstream from the mouth. It had a maximum discharge of 1,450 cubic feet (41 m^{3}) per second with a gauge height of 5.23 feet (1.59 m) on June 6, 2017 and a minimum discharge of .56 cubic feet (0.016 m^{3}) per second on September 7, 2016. Also outside the period of record, a severe flood occurred in August and September 2011, which reached a stage of roughly 14.6 feet (4.5 m). The average summer discharge is about 20 cubic feet (0.57 m^{3}) per second according to the DEC.

=== Water quality ===
NYSDEC performed a study of Fulmer Creek in 2005 and 2006. Biological sampling showed slightly impacted conditions, but was considered to be fully supported. DEC rates the water quality of the stream as Class C, suitable for fishing and non-contact human recreation. The agency also adds a "(T)", which means its suitable for trout populations.

=== Flood control ===
Fulmer Creek Basin has recorded major floods since as early as 1889. Most of the flood along the creek are caused by ice jamming from late December through spring, when ice on the creek breaks up and causes jams. Prior to 1963, the Main Street bridge in Mohawk was the most frequent location of ice jams. This bridge was later heightened, the span extended, and removal of a center pier which reduced risks of ice jams that blocks flow. Gravel and sediment builds up mostly between Main Street and the Mohawk. This caused a serious ice jam that caused major floods on February 14, 1971. The flood on August 31, 1950, is one of the largest known on the creek, with the measured discharge of roughly 3,250 cubic feet (92 m^{3}) per second. The lower end of the creek within parts of Mohawk by the Mohawk River, can experience backflow if the Mohawk River is in a flood stage.

In 1998, the U.S. Army Corps of Engineers began a study on projects to fix flooding problems. In cooperation with Corps, the Herkimer-Oneida Counties Comprehensive Planning Program (HOCCPP), and DEC began to study non-structural alternatives to prevent flooding. At this time DEC and HOCCPP developed flood management plan. Then in 2005, a study was performed and found that most sediment was caused by bank erosion at about 20 major locations along the creek. The sediment is then deposited which increases the streambed elevation, which reduces its carrying capacity and causes flooding.

In June 2013, in response to major flooding in the area, the NYSDOT along with the DEC, hired Milone and MacBroom, to study the watersheds of thirteen creeks in Herkimer, Oneida and Montgomery Counties, which included Fulmer Creek. Flood prevention projects were proposed and recommendations were made to prevent future floods. The study found that a large amount of steep slopes were prone to sliding, which contributes a large amount of sediment load on the creek. The study also listed three high risk areas that contribute to flooding. The first area is near where State Route 168 crosses the creek twice. The main problem was a large bank failure that was a major contributor to fine and course sediments and threatened the house and property located at the top of the bank failure on Casey Road. The bank failure was about 550-foot-long (170 m), and was approximately 220-foot-high (67 m). Work began on this section in early 2020. The project moved the creek channel away from the bank, and added 2,500 tons of boulder, 2,000 tons of retaining rock, and 2,700 tons of stackable boulder. Also willow trees were added to further prevent erosion. During the project a large pump was used to bypass the work area, which allowed work to be completed on both sides of the stream without interrupting flow.

The second high risk area was the section of the creek from Leatherstocking Trailer Park to where the creek passed under State Route 28. During the June 2013 flood, most of the trailers in the Leatherstocking park were seriously damaged, and some were completely destroyed. This section of the creek also experienced flooding in February 2014 due to an ice jam. This area also contained a large bank failure which was also a major contributor. This bank failure was about 300-foot-long (91 m) at its base, and was approximately 140-foot-high (43 m), which was less severe than the first area. If this section hadn't been rebuilt, the erosion would have affected the run-away truck ramp on State Route 28.

The third area was the section from Devendorf Street to slightly downstream of West Main Street. The major problem in this section was high amounts of sediment accumulation, which decreases flow capacity. Houses along Firman Street and Mohawk Central Valley School have received flood damage in the past. After the flood, dredging was performed to restore some of the creeks capacity. The project was approved and reconstruction on this section began in early summer of 2019, and concluded by the end of the year. The $1.4 million project completed by The Hubbell Companies, reconstructed the section, which eliminated a few houses and Harter Street, which ran along the section that was reconstructed.
