= Dodge Creek =

Stream in Ste. Genevieve County, Missouri, U.S.

Coordinates: 37.9242197°N 89.9945555°W

Dodge Creek is a stream in Ste. Genevieve County in the U.S. state of Missouri.

Dodge Creek has the name of Israel Dodge, a pioneer citizen.

== See also ==
- List of rivers of Missouri
