= Shakers Creek =

Creek which flows into the Mohawk River in Latham, New York

- Location of the mouth within New York Shakers Creek (the United States)

Location
- Country: United States
- State: New York

Physical characteristics
- Source
  - location: 42°43′13″N 73°47′54″W
- Mouth: Mohawk River
  - location: Latham, New York
  - coordinates: 42°46′46″N 73°47′28″W
  - elevation: 195 ft (59 m)
- Basin size: 11.5 sq mi (30 km^{2})

Shakers Creek is a river that flows into the Mohawk River in Latham, New York.
