= Dudley Creek =

Stream in the American state of Missouri

Coordinates: 36.559504°N 90.842344°W

Dudley Creek is a stream in Ripley County in the U.S. state of Missouri. It is a tributary of the Current River.

Dudley Creek is named for Willis Dudley, an early settler.

== See also ==
- List of rivers of Missouri
