= Beaver Creek (Unadilla River tributary) =

- Location of the mouth of Beaver Creek

Location
- Country: United States
- State: New York

Physical characteristics
- Source
  - coordinates: 42°54′55″N 75°19′18″W
- Mouth: Unadilla River
  - coordinates: 42°43′13″N 75°17′53″W
  - elevation: 1,099 ft (335 m)

Beaver Creek is a river in Chenango County, Madison County, and Oneida County in New York. It flows into Unadilla River north-northeast of South Edmeston.
