= Jackson Creek (Sprout Creek tributary) =

Stream in the U.S. state of New York

Coordinates: 41.63456°N 73.78375°W

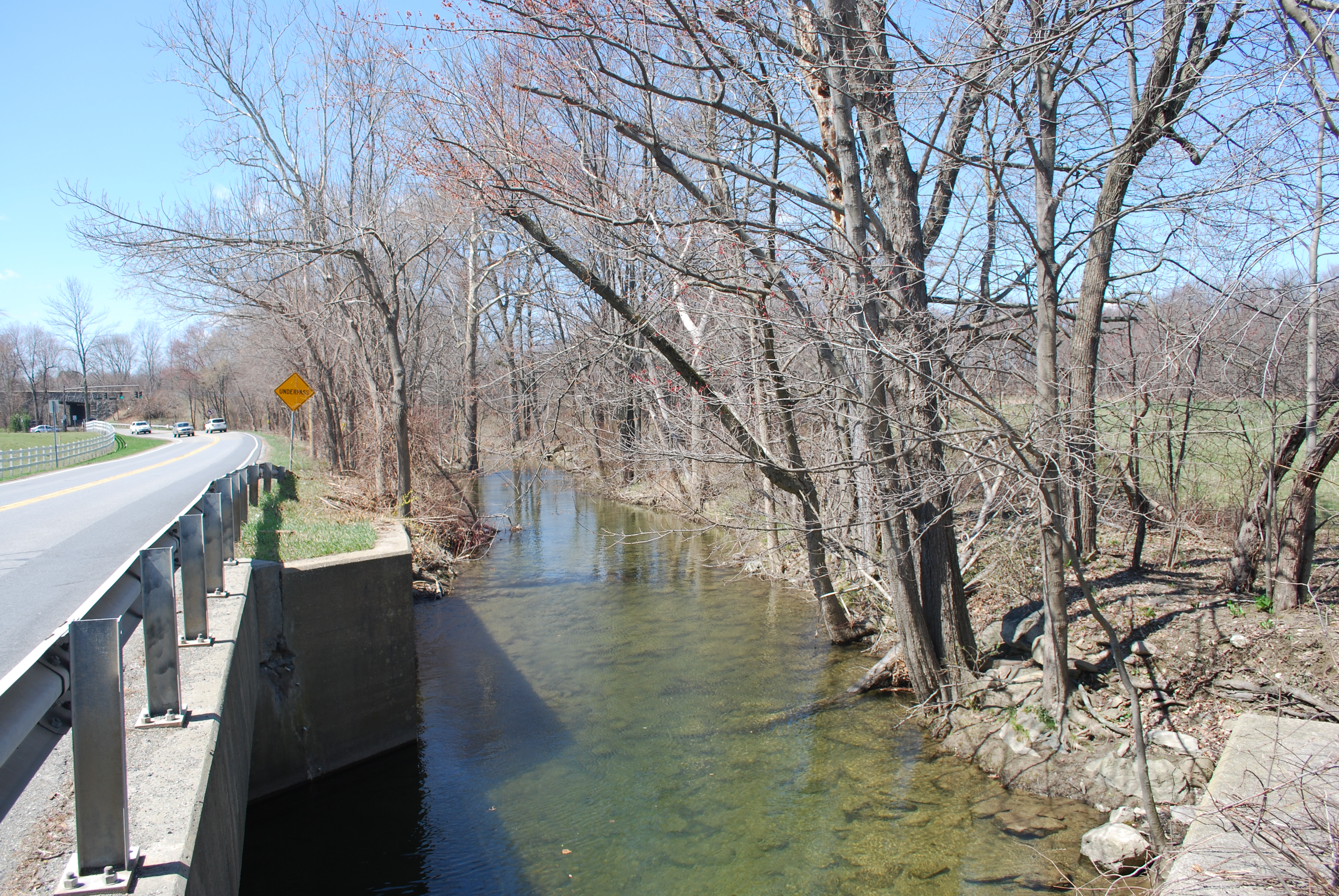
Jackson Creek off County Route 21

Jackson Creek is an 11.0-mile-long (17.7 km) tributary of Sprout Creek in Dutchess County, New York. Via Sprout Creek and Fishkill Creek, water from Jackson Creek flows to the Hudson River. Jackson Creek's subwatershed covers 5,524 acres (22.35 km^{2}) of land.

== Course ==
Jackson Creek rises in the town of Union Vale. It flows southwestward and receives a small creek from the right bank. Passing through relatively rural land, the creek receives a larger creek from its left bank and abruptly turns westward. After meeting a small tributary on its right bank, Jackson Creek resumes a southwestward course and crosses under New York State Route 55, locally Freedom Plains Road. Now in a more developed area, it converges with another creek and flows under County Route 21 (Noxon Road). The creek passes under NY 82, and shortly thereafter receives a small stream from the right bank. The creek flows near the Lagrange Park and continues to parallel CR 21. The creek ultimately crosses under the Taconic State Parkway in LaGrange and flows into Sprout Creek.

The creek's New York State Department of Environmental Conservation classification varies from class C(T) to C(TS). Class C means the creek is suitable for fishing or boating.

== Watershed ==
The creek's watershed covers 5,524 acres (22.35 km^{2}) of land, accounting for 4% of the larger Fishkill Creek watershed. It encompasses three towns: Union Vale, LaGrange, and Beekman. In 2000, 42% of the land surrounding Jackson Creek was forested, 27% was residential, and 19% was used for agricultural purposes. The creek suffers numerous impairments, including flooding, erosion, sedimentation, man-made alteration, litter, and invasive plants. One particularly resilient species—the Mile-a-minute vine (Ipomoea cairica)—is a major problem in the area. A 2007 study found 16 drainage pipes along the creek, as well as coverts and bridges that restrict its flow and result in localized flooding. A concrete dam along the creek's course prevents fish migration. However, several segments of the creek are considered to be in relatively good condition, especially near its mouth, and populations of trout have been observed.

== See also ==
- List of rivers of New York
