= Mill Creek (Owasco Inlet) =

Location
- Country: United States
- State: New York

Physical characteristics
- Mouth: Owasco Inlet
  - location: Moravia, New York, United States
  - coordinates: 42.71134°N 76.43371°W
  - elevation: 721 ft (220 m)
- Basin size: 31 mi^{2} (80 km^{2})

Mill Creek is a river located in Cayuga County, New York. It flows into Owasco Inlet by Moravia, New York.
