= Owasco Inlet =

Location
- Country: United States
- State: New York

Physical characteristics
- Source: Unnamed Marsh
  - location: north of Freeville, New York
- Mouth: Owasco Lake
  - location: Cascade, New York, United States
  - coordinates: 42°45′19″N 76°27′49″W
- Basin size: 117 mi^{2} (300 km^{2})

Basin features
- Tributaries
  - left: Hemlock Creek
  - right: Mill Creek

Owasco Inlet is a river located in Cayuga County, New York. It starts at an unnamed marsh north of Freeville, New York and flows north before emptying into Owasco Lake.
