= Abe Lord Creek =

Abe Lord Creek Tributary to Delaware River
- Location of Abe Lord Creek mouth Abe Lord Creek (the United States)

Location
- Country: United States
- State: New York
- County: Delaware

Physical characteristics
- Source: East Branch Delaware River divide
  - location: Pond about 1 mile west of French Woods, New York
  - coordinates: 41°54′57″N 075°11′49″W
  - elevation: 1,530 ft (470 m)
- Mouth: Delaware River
  - location: about 0.5 miles east of Lordville, New York
  - coordinates: 41°52′13″N 075°12′12″W
  - elevation: 843 ft (257 m)
- Length: 2.62 mi (4.22 km)
- Basin size: 4.07 square miles (10.5 km^{2})
- Discharge
  - location: Delaware River
  - average: 7.50 cu ft/s (0.212 m^{3}/s) at mouth with Delaware River

Basin features
- Progression: south
- River system: Delaware River
- Tributaries
  - left: unnamed tributaries
  - right: unnamed tributaries
- Bridges: none

Abe Lord Creek is a 2.62 mi (4.22 km) long 1st order tributary to the Delaware River in Delaware County, New York.

== Course ==
Abe Lord Creek rises in a pond about 1 mile west of French Woods in Delaware County, New York on the East Branch Delaware River divide. Abe Lord Creek then flows south to meet the Delaware River about 0.5 miles east of Lordville, New York.

== Watershed ==
Abe Lord Creek drains 4.07 square miles (10.5 km^{2}) of area, receives about 45.3 in/year of precipitation, has a topographic wetness index of 364.43 and is about 88.9% forested.

== Maps ==
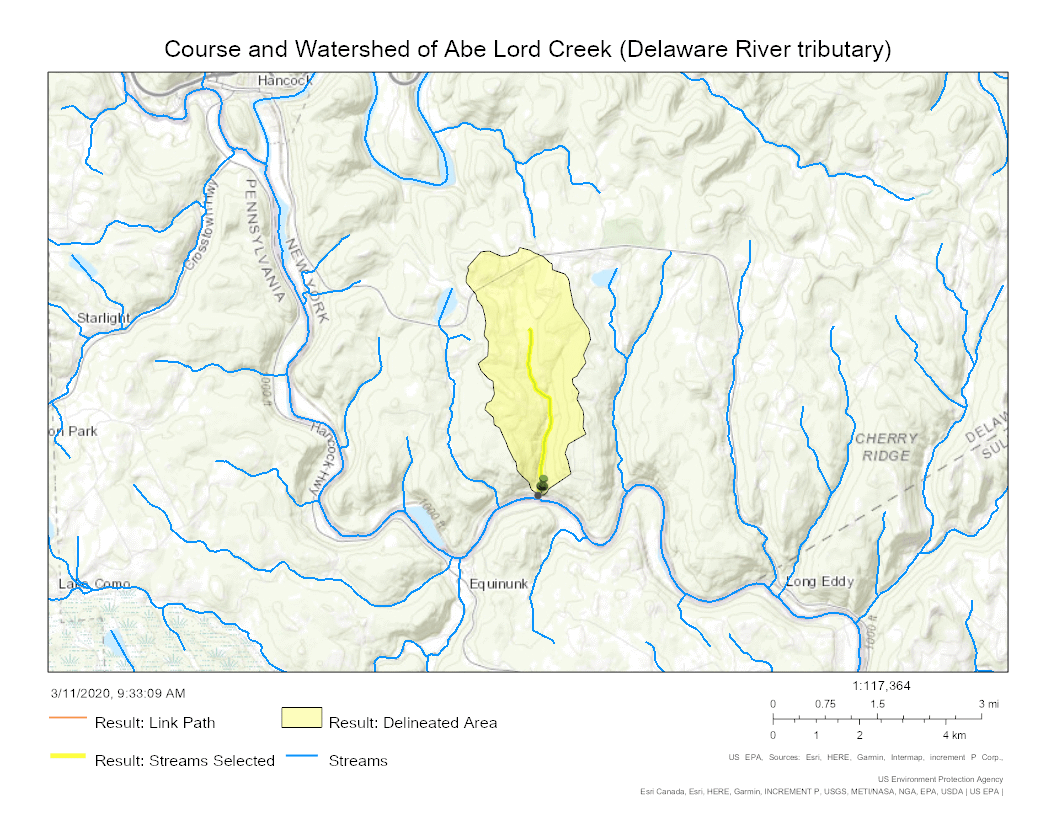
Course and Watershed of Abe Lord Creek (Delaware River tributary)
