= West Creek (Cobleskill Creek tributary) =

Location
- Country: United States
- State: New York

Physical characteristics
- Mouth: Cobleskill Creek
  - location: Warnerville, New York, United States
  - coordinates: 42°39′41″N 74°30′26″W
- Basin size: 53.2 sq mi (138 km^{2})

West Creek flows through Seward, New York, and Hyndsville, New York, before converging with Cobleskill Creek in Warnerville, New York.
