= Mill Creek (Hudson River tributary) =

Mill Creek Tierken Kil
- Native name: Poetanock (undetermined)

Location
- Country: United States
- State: New York
- County: Rensselaer
- Towns: Rensselaer, East Greenbush

Physical characteristics
- Source
  - location: North Greenbush, New York
  - coordinates: 42°39′39″N 73°38′42″W
- Mouth: Hudson River
  - location: Rensselaer, New York
  - coordinates: 42°38′33″N 73°44′34″W
  - elevation: 164 ft (50 m)

Mill Creek, also previously known as Tierken Kill, is a tributary to the Hudson River. Poetanock was the Native American name for the stream. From its source just west of Snyders Lake in East Greenbush the stream travels southwest, then north and west to the Hudson River. The stream has two waterfalls on the Mill Brook: the Upper Falls, and the Lower Falls. The mouth of the creek is on the Hudson River opposite from Albany, New York at what was Van Rensselaer Island, in the City of Rensselaer.
