= Burditt Brook =

- Location of the mouth in New York

Location
- Country: United States
- State: New York
- Region: Central New York Region

Physical characteristics
- Source
  - coordinates: 42°39′18″N 74°59′45″W
- Mouth: Susquehanna River
  - location: Hyde Park, New York
  - coordinates: 42°38′21″N 74°57′08″W
  - elevation: 1,161 ft (354 m)

Burditt Brook is a river located in central Otsego County, New York. The creek converges with the Susquehanna River by Hyde Park, New York.
