= Opalescent River =

River tributary in New York, United States

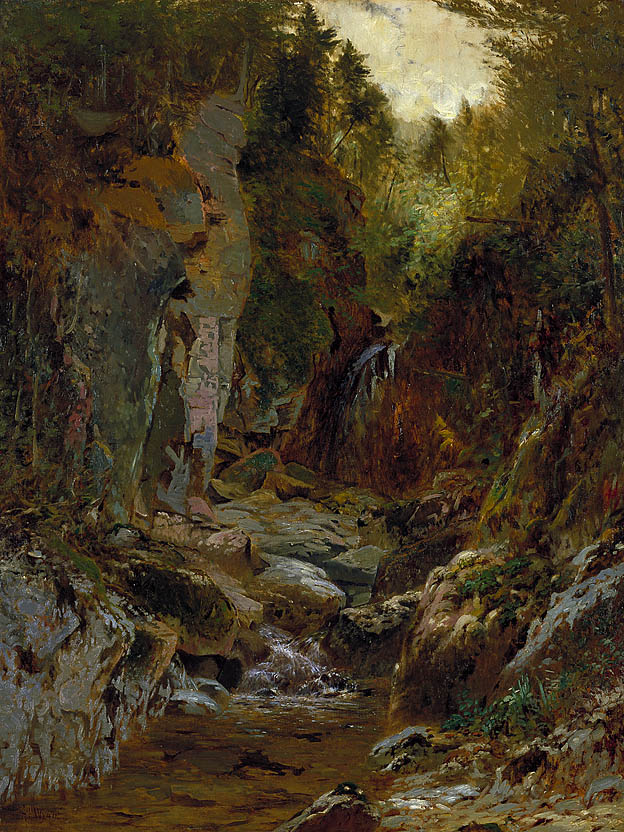
- Painting of a flume in the Opalescent River by Alexander H. Wyant

Location
- Country: United States
- State: New York
- Region: Adirondacks
- County: Essex

Physical characteristics
- Source: Little Marcy Mountain
  - location: Adirondack Mountains, New York, United States
  - elevation: 4,200 ft (1,300 m)
- Mouth
  - coordinates: 44.0181°N 74.0528°W

The Opalescent River is a river in Essex County, New York. It is both a tributary of and the longest source of the Hudson River. Part of the river is designated by New York State as a Wild River in the Wild, Scenic, and Recreational Rivers system.

== Course ==
Opalescent River has its source on the west side of Little Marcy Mountain, at over 4,200 ft (1,300 m) in elevation. After nearly two miles, Feldspar Brook—which itself originates from Lake Tear of the Clouds—converges with the Opalescent. The river then passes through Flowed Lands, and 11 miles later reaches Calamity Brook, at which point the stream becomes cartographically known as the Hudson River.

The 11-mile stretch from Flowed Lands to the confluence with the Hudson River is designated a New York State Wild River by the New York State Department of Environmental Conservation (DEC).

== History ==
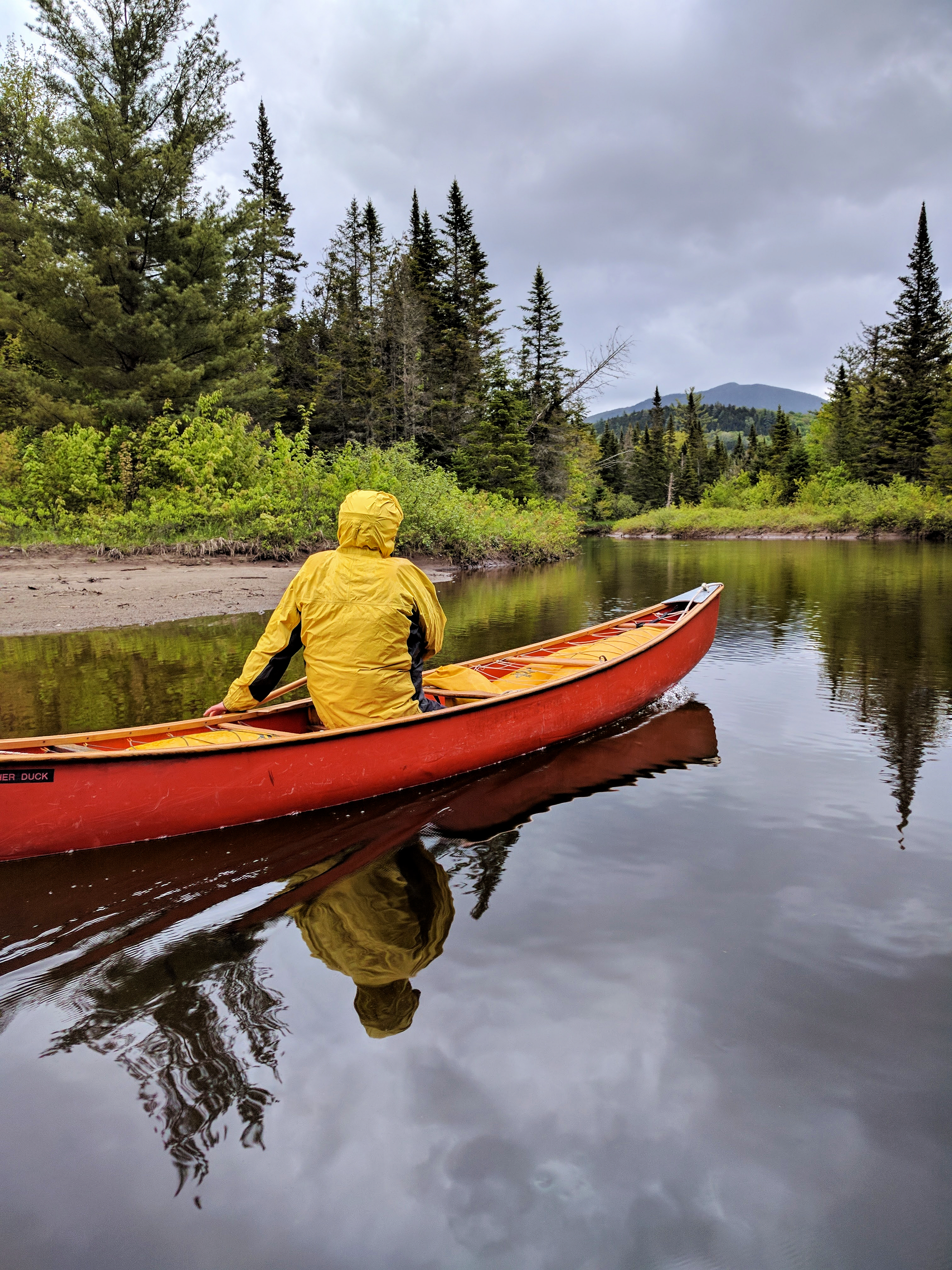
A canoeist on the Opalescent River near its confluence with the Hudson River (GPS 44.018172, -74.052487).

In the 1800s, David Henderson, the owner of an iron vein, thought to dam the Opalescent River to run water past his blast furnaces. The dam was eventually built, but only after Henderson died in a gunshot accident while scouting locations for the dam. The dam diverted water to Calamity Brook (named after the aforementioned accident) until 1984, when it was broken by the DEC over safety concerns.

In 2015, the DEC purchased the 6,200 acre MacIntyre East Tract (which contains seven miles of the lower part of Opalescent River) from The Nature Conservancy for $4.2 million. This acquisition gave more access to visitors for wilderness paddling, as well as opening up the shores to picnicking, fishing, and camping.

In 2018, the DEC proposed the creation of three parking areas along the upper Hudson River with put-ins and take-outs for paddlers, including one near the confluence of the Opalescent River and the Hudson River.
