= Martin Brook =

- Location of the mouth of Martin Brook

Location
- Country: United States
- State: New York
- County: Otsego

Physical characteristics
- Source
  - coordinates: 42°21′41″N 75°19′12″W
- Mouth: Susquehanna River
  - coordinates: 42°19′23″N 75°18′42″W
  - elevation: 981 ft (299 m)

Martin Brook is a river in Otsego County, New York. It converges with the Susquehanna River in Unadilla.
