= Quacken Kill =

Coordinates: 42°45′34.6″N 73°31′46.5″W

Location
- Country: United States

Quacken Kill is a stream in the U.S. state of New York. It is fed by While Lily Pond in Grafton and empties into Poesten Kill in Poestenkill

Quacken Kill is a name derived from Dutch most likely meaning "heron creek".
