= Sterling Creek (Mohawk River tributary) =

- Location of the mouth within New York Sterling Creek (Mohawk River tributary) (the United States)

Location
- Country: United States
- State: New York
- Region: Central New York Region
- County: Herkimer
- Town: Schuyler

Physical characteristics
- Source
  - coordinates: 43°08′56″N 75°03′52″W
- Mouth: Mohawk River
  - location: ESE of West Schuyler
  - coordinates: 43°04′14″N 75°07′18″W
  - elevation: 387 ft (118 m)
- Basin size: 19.3 sq mi (50 km^{2})

Sterling Creek is a river located in Herkimer County in the U.S. State of New York. It flows into the Mohawk River east-southeast of the Hamlet of West Schuyler.

== Hydrology ==
Aquatic life, recreation uses, and natural resources habitat are stressed in Sterling Creek due to habitat modifications and resulting silt and sediment deposits in the stream. A macroinvertebrate assessment of Sterling Creek near the mouth was conducted in 2000, which showed slightly impacted conditions.
