= Sixmile Creek (Mohawk River tributary) =

Location
- Country: United States
- State: New York

Physical characteristics
- Mouth: Mohawk River
  - location: Oriskany, New York
  - coordinates: 43°11′54″N 75°22′21″W
  - elevation: 418 ft (127 m)
- Basin size: 14.7 mi^{2} (38 km^{2})

The Sixmile Creek flows into the Mohawk River northwest of Oriskany, New York.
