= Coxsackie Creek =

- Native name: mak-kachs-hack-ing

Location
- Country: United States
- State: New York
- County: Greene County
- Towns: , Coxsackie, New York

Physical characteristics
- Source
  - location: Coxsackie (town), New York
  - coordinates: 42°18′54″N 73°51′51″W
- Mouth: Hudson River
  - location: New Baltimore, New York
  - coordinates: 42°23′35″N 73°47′40″W
  - elevation: 0 ft (0 m)

Coxsackie Creek is a 9.8-mile-long (15.8 km) tributary to the Hudson River in the towns of Coxsackie and New Baltimore, New York in the United States.

== Tributaries ==
- Sickles Creek
- Coxsackie Reservoir
- Broncks Lake, in the hills above Bronck House
