= Muitzes Kill =

Stream in New York, United States

Coordinates: 42°30′53.29″N 73°45′49.44″W

Muitzes Kill is a stream in the U.S. state of New York.

Muitzes Kill is a name derived from Dutch most likely meaning "mice creek".
