= Hemlock Creek (New York) =

Location
- Country: United States
- State: New York

Physical characteristics
- Mouth: Owasco Inlet
  - location: Locke, New York, United States
  - coordinates: 42°39′31″N 76°25′42″W
- Basin size: 18.2 mi^{2} (47 km^{2})

Hemlock Creek is a river located in Cayuga and Tompkins counties. It flows into Owasco Inlet by Locke, New York.
