= Roaring Brook (Black River tributary) =

Location
- Country: United States
- State: New York

Physical characteristics
- Mouth: Black River
  - location: Martinsburg, New York
  - coordinates: 43°44′32″N 75°24′26″W
  - elevation: 730 ft (220 m)
- Basin size: 28.2 mi^{2} (73 km^{2})

Roaring Brook flows into the Black River near Martinsburg, New York.
