= Johnson Creek, New York =

Hamlet in New York, United States

Coordinates: 43°14′44″N 78°30′55″W

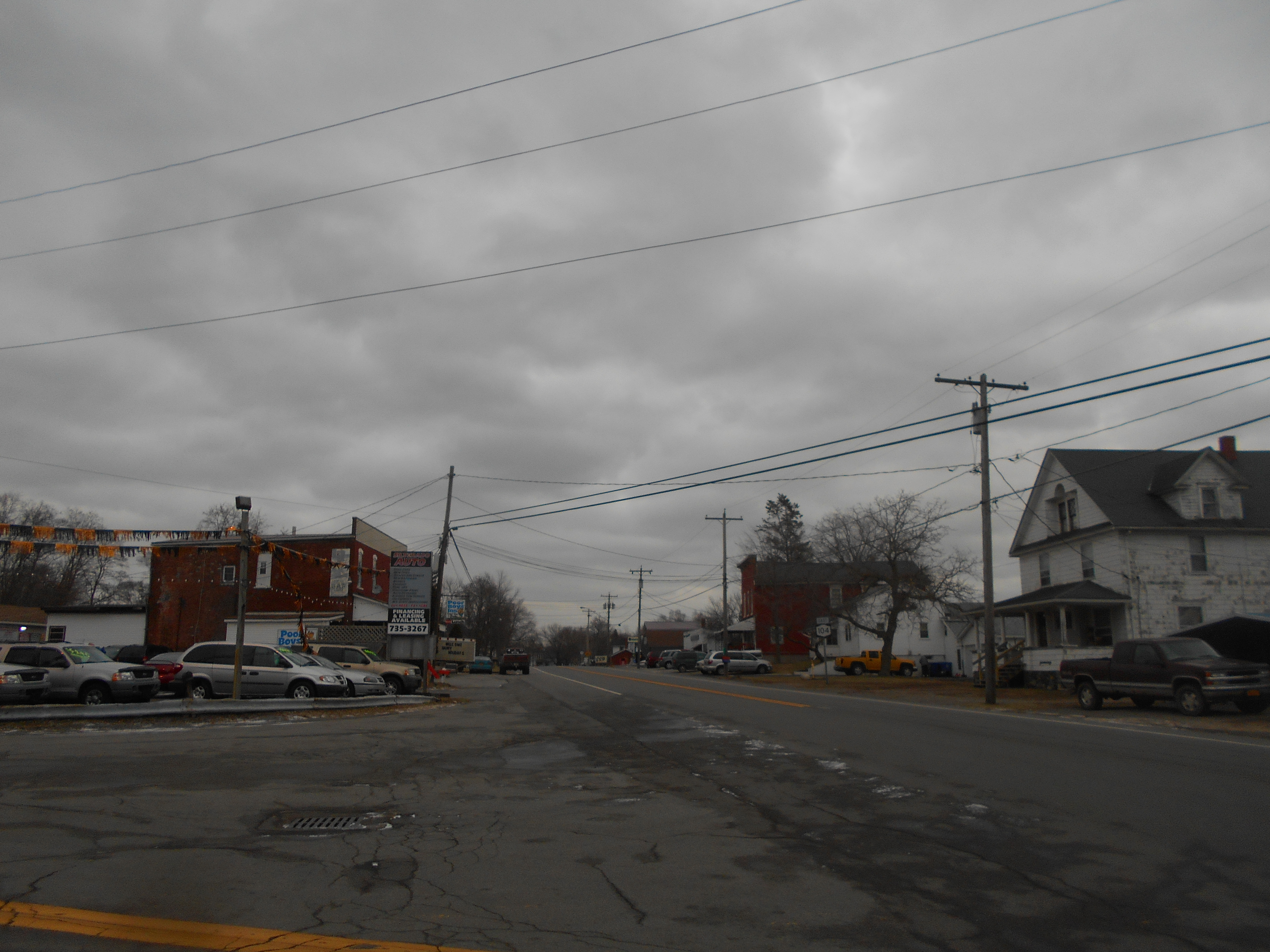
The hamlet of Johnson Creek along Route 104

Johnson Creek is a hamlet in the town of Hartland in Niagara County, New York, United States.
