= Bouchoux Brook =

- Location of the mouth of Bouchoux Brook

Location
- Country: United States
- State: New York
- County: Delaware

Physical characteristics
- Source
  - coordinates: 41°55′17″N 75°09′57″W
- Mouth: Delaware River
  - coordinates: 41°52′17″N 75°10′44″W
  - elevation: 830 ft (250 m)

Bouchoux Brook is a river in Delaware County, New York. It flows into the Delaware River east of Lordville.
