= Bowery Creek =

Location
- Country: United States
- State: New York
- County: Greene
- Towns: , Freehold, Durham

Physical characteristics
- Source: Windham High Peak
  - location: Cairo, New York
  - coordinates: 42°18′59″N 74°07′47″W
- Mouth: Catskill Creek
  - location: Freehold, New York
  - coordinates: 42°21′44″N 74°04′07″W
  - elevation: 0 ft (0 m)

Bowery Creek is a 6.0-mile-long (9.7 km) tributary of Catskill Creek north of the Catskill Mountains of New York. Via Catskill Creek, it is part of the Hudson River watershed. Bowery Creek rises east of Windham High Peak in the northern part of the town of Cairo and flows northeast to Catskill Creek west of Freehold.

The name "Bowery" comes from the Dutch word for farm.
