= Ninemile Creek (Mohawk River tributary) =

Location
- Country: United States
- State: New York

Physical characteristics
- Mouth: Mohawk River
  - location: Oriskany, New York
  - coordinates: 43°10′44″N 75°20′12″W
  - elevation: 418 ft (127 m)
- Basin size: 70.1 mi^{2} (182 km^{2})

The Ninemile Creek flows into the Mohawk River near Oriskany, New York.
