= Cayadutta Creek =

- Location of the mouth within New York Cayadutta Creek (the United States)

Location
- Country: United States
- State: New York
- Counties: Fulton, Montgomery

Physical characteristics
- Source
  - location: Northwest of Gloversville
  - coordinates: 43°04′57″N 74°24′05″W
  - elevation: Approximately 1,440 ft (440 m)
- Mouth: Mohawk River
  - location: Fonda
  - coordinates: 42°57′02″N 74°22′49″W
  - elevation: 275 ft (84 m)
- Basin size: 63.7 sq mi (165 km^{2})

Cayadutta Creek is a river in Fulton and Montgomery counties in the state of New York. It begins northwest of Gloversville and flows in a general southward direction before flowing into the Mohawk River in Fonda. The Indian meaning of Cayadutta is "rippling waters" or "shallow water running over stones". This stream has commercial and historical importance as the cities of Johnstown and Gloversville lie on its banks.

== Geology ==
The Cayadutta Creek, or some similarly located stream, was one of the ancient watercourses which drained the southern Adirondack slopes.
