= Red Creek (Susquehanna River tributary) =

- Location of the mouth in New York

Location
- Country: United States
- State: New York
- Region: Otsego County

Physical characteristics
- Mouth: Susquehanna River
  - location: Cooperstown, New York
  - coordinates: 42°41′02″N 74°56′05″W
- Basin size: 12.9 sq mi (33 km^{2})

Red Creek is a river located in central Otsego County, New York. The creek converges with the Susquehanna River south of Cooperstown, New York.
