= Little West Kill =

Location
- Country: United States
- State: New York

Physical characteristics
- Source
  - location: Delaware County, New York
- Mouth: Schoharie Creek
  - location: Lexington, Greene County, New York, United States
  - coordinates: 42°16′04″N 74°24′46″W
- Basin size: 8.21 mi^{2} (21.3 km^{2})

Little West Kill flows into the Schoharie Creek by Lexington, New York.
