= Little River (Grass River tributary) =

Location
- Country: United States
- State: New York

Physical characteristics
- Mouth: Grass River
  - location: Canton, New York
  - coordinates: 44°34′43″N 75°09′48″W
  - elevation: 340 ft (100 m)
- Basin size: 99.8 mi^{2} (258 km^{2})

The Little River flows into the Grass River in Canton, New York.
