= Oswayo Creek =

Stream in New York and Pennsylvania, U.S.

Coordinates: 42°01′37″N 78°20′49″W

Oswayo Creek is a stream in the U.S. states of New York and Pennsylvania. It is a tributary to the Allegheny River.

Oswayo is a Native American name purported to mean "the place of flies". Variant names and spellings include "Oswaya Creek", "Oswaye Creek", "Oswego Creek", and "Osweya Creek".
