= Ouleout Creek =

- Location of the mouth of Ouleout Creek

Location
- Country: United States
- State: New York
- County: Delaware

Physical characteristics
- Source
  - coordinates: 42°23′49″N 74°55′03″W
- Mouth: Susquehanna River
  - coordinates: 42°20′03″N 75°17′44″W
  - elevation: 1,001 ft (305 m)

Basin features
- Tributaries
  - left: Treadwell Creek, Handsome Brook
  - right: Knapp Brook, Gay Creek

Ouleout Creek is a river in Delaware County, New York. It flows through East Sidney Lake before converging with the Susquehanna River east-northeast of Unadilla.
