= T Lake Falls =

- Location within New York Adirondack Park Location within the United States
- Location: Hamilton County, New York
- Coordinates: 43°27′23″N 74°36′47″W
- Type: Waterfall
- Elevation: 2,723 feet (830 m)
- Watercourse: Unnamed tributary of South Branch West Canada Creek

T Lake Falls is the tallest waterfall in New York State and in the Adirondacks, at minimum twice the height of Niagara Falls in Niagara Falls, NY. It is located in Hamilton County, New York in the West Canada Lake Wilderness Area. The height of T Lake Falls has been stated as of 350 feet up to 600, depending on the source. The falls is on an unnamed tributary of the South Branch West Canada Creek. This area was used by Native American hunters and first settlers.

Several people have died after falling from the falls. Because of these fatalities, the trail beyond the lake and lean-to to the falls are no longer maintained and have been closed by the New York State Department of Environmental Conservation. However, T Lake and the falls remain an attraction because of the several different ways to hike in, and the option of staying at the lean-to at the lake. There is also swimming in the pool at the bottom of the falls in the summer months and snow shoeing or cross-country skiing to the falls to go ice climbing in the winter.

== Access ==
There are three different ways of hiking into these falls; two of them are from Piseco and the third is from Nobleboro off Mountain Rd. First, is the actual trail head across the road from Poplar Point state campsite. There is a trail sign marking where it begins and states that it is 3.6 miles to the lake where the lean-to is. After the lake, is a 1.8 mile hike to the falls on an unmaintained trail that is difficult to follow. The other way in, coming from Piseco, is bushwhacking off the Mill Stream trail starting on Haskell’s Road. This way in is considered easier because the trail is flatter from Mill Stream to the state trail. The third way in is off Mountain Home Road, which brings one to the bottom of the falls. It is also the shortest: 5 miles from the trail head to the falls.

== Deaths ==
On Aug 18, 1960, a 14-year-old boy fell 200 feet into the pool at the bottom of the falls during a summer camp hiking trip.

On July 5, 1965 a male went over the falls and died.

On Aug 29, 1973, a 17-year-old girl lost her footing crossing the top of the falls and uncontrollably tumbled down 600 feet. The coroner's physician said she 'died of massive head injuries.'

On Aug 1, 1993 another male Charles R. Heise, 18 years and 7 and a 1/2 months old went over the falls and died.

Rescuers must hike at least 5 miles to get to injured persons, who are sometimes brought out on horseback. There are several memorials at the bottom of the falls for all the people that have lost their lives.
