= Mad Tom Lake =

- Location of Mad Tom Lake within New York
- Location: Herkimer County, New York
- Coordinates: 43°24′39″N 74°54′56″W
- Type: Lake
- Primary outflows: Mad Tom Brook
- Basin countries: United States
- Surface elevation: 1,703 ft (519 m)
- Settlements: Wilmurt

Mad Tom Lake is located north of Wilmurt in Herkimer County, New York. It drains southwest via Mad Tom Brook which flows into the West Canada Creek.

== See also ==
- List of lakes in New York
