= Lake Whitney =

Lake Whitney could be:

- Lake Whitney (McLeod County, Minnesota)
- Lake Whitney (Texas)
  - Lake Whitney Ranch
- Lake Whitney (Connecticut)
- Whitney Lake (New York)
