= Honnedaga =

Honnedaga may refer to:

- Honnedaga Lake, a lake in the state New York
- Honnedaga Brook, a brook in the state New York
