= Jessup River Wild Forest =

- IUCN category Ib (wilderness area)
- Interactive map of Jessup River Wild Forest
- Location: Adirondack Park, New York, USA
- Nearest city: Indian Lake, New York
- Coordinates: 43.467479°N 74.4211277°W
- Area: 47,350 acres (191.6 km^{2})
- Governing body: New York State Department of Environmental Conservation

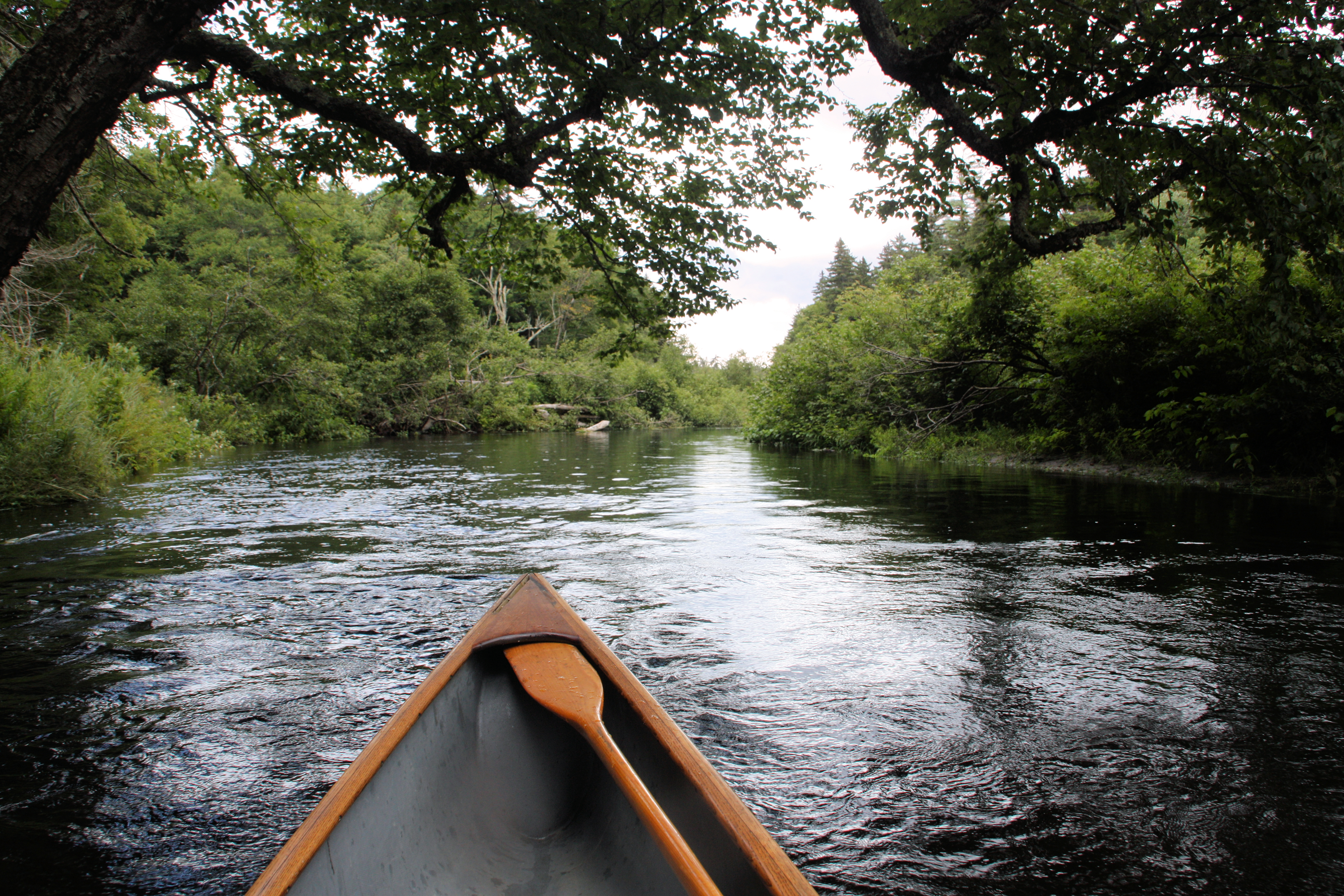
The Jessup River from a canoe

The Jessup River Wild Forest is a 47,350 acres (191.6 km^{2}) Forest Preserve area in the towns of Lake Pleasant, Arietta, Indian Lake, and Wells in Hamilton County, in the U.S. state of New York.

NY-28 is the border of the forest to the north and NY-30 is the border of the forest in the southeast. West Canada Lake Wilderness Area is located to the west, Siamese Ponds Wilderness Area is located to the east, and the Silver Lake Wilderness Area to the south. Indian Lake, Piseco, Speculator, and Wells are located near or within the Jessup River Wild Forest. Within the forest are many hiking trails, and many rivers and lakes suitable for canoeing and fishing, including the Jessup River. Part of the Northville-Placid Trail is located within the forest.

== See also ==
- List of Wilderness Areas in the Adirondack Park
