= Fort Noble Mountain =

Mountain in United States of America

- Location within New York Location within the United States

Highest point
- Elevation: 2,310 feet (700 m)
- Coordinates: 43°24′38″N 74°49′23″W

Geography
- Location: ENE of Nobleboro, New York, U.S.
- Topo map: USGS Morehouseville

Fort Noble Mountain is a 2,310-foot-tall (700 m) mountain in the Adirondack Mountains of New York. It is located east-northeast of Nobleboro, on the line between the town of Ohio in Herkimer County and town of Morehouse in Hamilton County. In July 1910, a 30-foot-tall (9.1 m) wood fire lookout tower was built on the mountain. In 1916, it was replaced with a 50-foot-tall (15 m) steel tower. The tower ceased fire lookout operations in 1978, and was later removed.

== History ==
In July 1910, the Forest, Fish and Game Commission built a 30-foot-tall (9.1 m) wood fire lookout tower on the mountain. In 1916, the Conservation Commission replaced it with a 50-foot-tall (15 m) Aermotor LL25 tower. The tower was of a lighter weight than the 1917 design and had no stairs but only a ladder up the exterior to get to the top. In 1918 or 1919, wooden steps were added within the structure to ease access to the top of the tower. The tower ceased fire lookout operations in 1978. The tower was later removed because it was deemed excess to the fire detection needs and additionally was classified as a "non-conforming" structure in the Fort Noble Primitive Area. With the tower removed, it made it possible for changing the land classification to Wilderness.
