= Big Brook (West Canada Creek tributary) =

River in New York state

Location
- Country: United States
- State: New York

Physical characteristics
- Mouth: West Canada Creek
  - coordinates: 43°26′14″N 74°49′49″W
  - elevation: 1,575 ft (480 m)

Big Brook flows into West Canada Creek a few miles upstream of Nobleboro, New York, in Herkimer County, New York.
