= Raymond Hills =

Mountain in New York, United States

- Location within New York Location within the United States

Highest point
- Elevation: 2,602 feet (793 m)
- Coordinates: 43°31′13″N 74°50′09″W

Geography
- Location: NE of Ohio, New York, U.S.
- Topo map: USGS Honnedaga Lake

Raymond Hills is a summit located in Central New York Region of New York located in the Town of Ohio in Herkimer County, northeast of Ohio. Honnedaga Lake is located north of the elevation.
