= Metcalf Lake =

- Location within New York Metcalf Lake (the United States)
- Location: Hamilton County, New York, United States
- Coordinates: 43°28′01″N 74°39′39″W
- Type: Lake
- Primary outflows: Metcalf Brook
- Basin countries: United States
- Surface area: 95 acres (0.38 km^{2})
- Max. depth: 30 feet (9.1 m)
- Shore length^{1}: 3.6 miles (5.8 km)
- Surface elevation: 2,379 feet (725 m)
- Islands: 2
- Settlements: Perkins Clearing, New York
- ^{1} Shore length is not a well-defined measure.

Metcalf Lake is located northeast of Hoffmeister, New York. Fish species present in the lake are brook trout, and black bullhead. No motors are allowed on this lake.
