= South Branch West Canada Creek =

- Location of the mouth of South West Canada Creek in New York State South Branch West Canada Creek (the United States)

Location
- Country: United States
- State: New York

Physical characteristics
- Source
  - location: Hamilton County, New York
- Mouth: West Canada Creek
  - location: Nobleboro, New York, Herkimer County, New York, United States
  - coordinates: 43°23′53″N 74°50′40″W
- Basin size: 54.1 sq mi (140 km^{2})

Basin features
- Tributaries
  - left: T Lake Outlet, Twin Lakes Outlet, G Lake Outlet, Alder Brook, Vly Brook
  - right: Beaudry Brook, Wagoner Brook, Roaring Brook, Mad Tom Brook, Wilmurt Lake Outlet

South Branch West Canada Creek empties into the West Canada Creek by Nobleboro, New York.

== Course ==
The West Canada Creek's south branch gets its start at T-lake, northwest of Piseco Lake. It travels southwest, through the town of Morehouse, and joins the main branch of the West Canada at Nobleboro. North of Route 8 on Mountain Home Road is a man-made lake called The Floe on the maps, but to the locals it is called Mountain Home Pond.
