= Cedar River Flow =

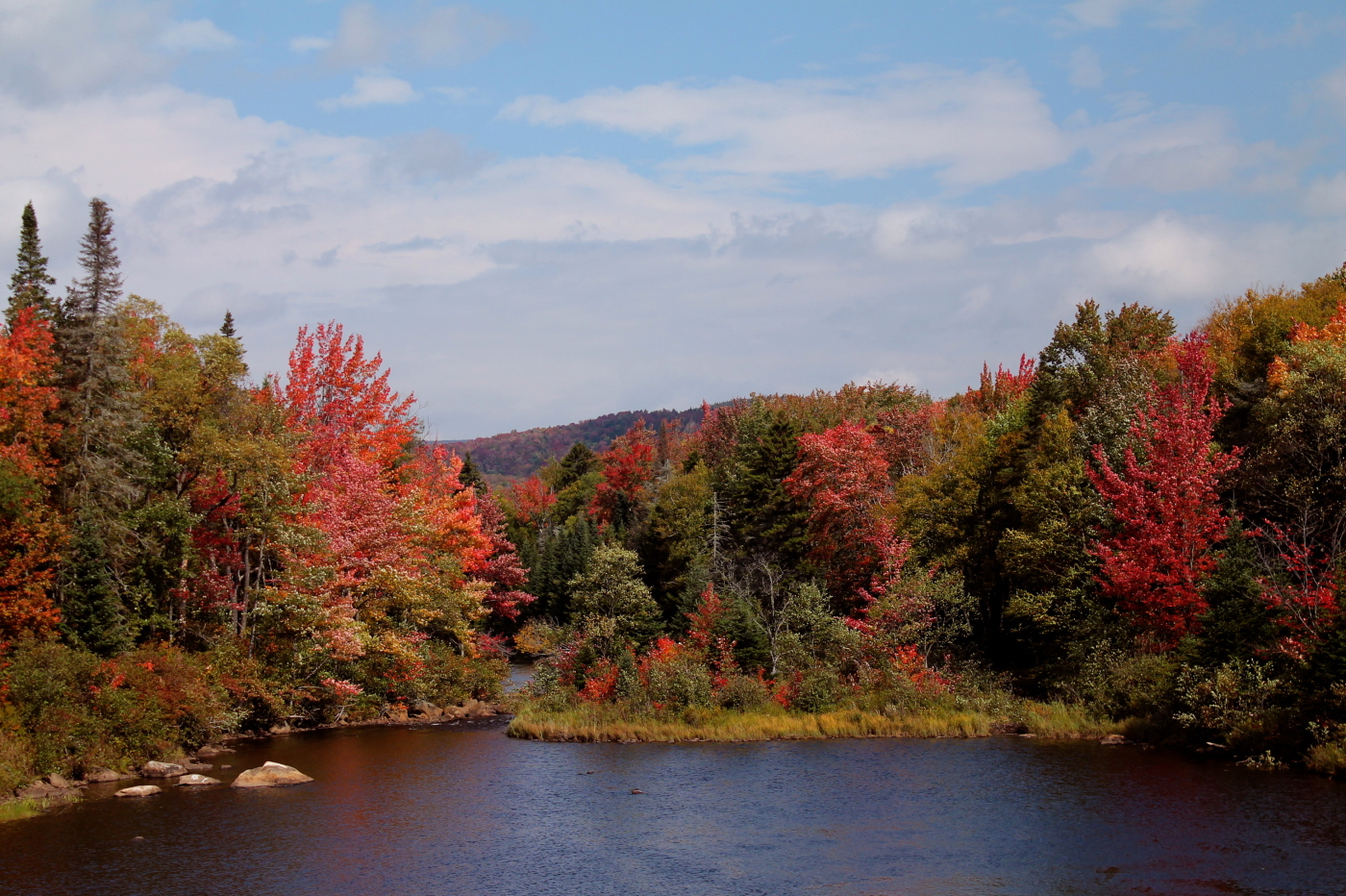
- Cedar River Flow in the fall

- Location of Cedar River Flow within New York State Cedar River Flow (the United States)
- Location: Hamilton County, New York
- Coordinates: 43°42′31″N 74°28′38″W
- Type: Reservoir
- Primary inflows: Cedar River
- Primary outflows: Cedar River
- Surface area: 640 acres (2.6 km^{2})
- Surface elevation: 2,100 feet (640 m)
- Settlements: Indian Lake, New York

The Cedar River Flow is a remote 640 acres (2.6 km^{2}) shallow lake, created by the Wakely Dam on the Cedar River, where there are a number of campsites accessible via a gravel road, 14 miles (23 km) from Indian Lake or 23 miles (37 km) from Inlet. More campsites are accessible via canoe, around the Flow. It lies on the border between the Moose River Plains Wild Forest and the West Canada Lake Wilderness Area. Fish species present in the lake include brook trout, brown trout, and white sucker. There is a carry down boat access via a trail from the Northville-Lake Placid Trail on the west shore.

Cedar River Flow is an excellent, secluded spot for wilderness paddling. The Moose River flows through the area and is enclosed near the camping area by a small dam with a bridge over it.
