= Mill Creek (Nobleboro, New York) =

Location
- Country: United States
- State: New York

Physical characteristics
- Source: Mill Creek Lake
  - coordinates: 43°25′06″N 74°53′11″W
- Mouth: West Canada Creek
  - location: Nobleboro, New York
  - coordinates: 43°23′52″N 74°51′31″W
  - elevation: 1,388 ft (423 m)

Mill Creek flows into West Canada Creek in Nobleboro, New York, in Herkimer County, New York.
