= Nobleboro =

Nobleboro or Nobleborough may refer to the following:

- Nobleboro, Maine
- Nobleboro, New York
- Nobleborough (meteorite), a meteorite fall that occurred in Nobleboro, Maine in 1823
