= Spruce Lake =

- Location within New York Spruce Lake (the United States)
- Location: Hamilton County, New York, United States
- Coordinates: 43°32′00″N 74°36′42″W
- Type: Lake
- Primary outflows: Indian River
- Basin countries: United States
- Surface area: 178 acres (0.72 km^{2})
- Max. depth: 70 feet (21 m)
- Shore length^{1}: 4.3 miles (6.9 km)
- Surface elevation: 2,379 feet (725 m)
- Settlements: Piseco, New York
- ^{1} Shore length is not a well-defined measure.

Spruce Lake is located northwest of Piseco, New York. Fish species present in the lake are brook trout, and black bullhead. There is trail access on the east shore from the Northville-Placid Trail. No motors are allowed on this lake.

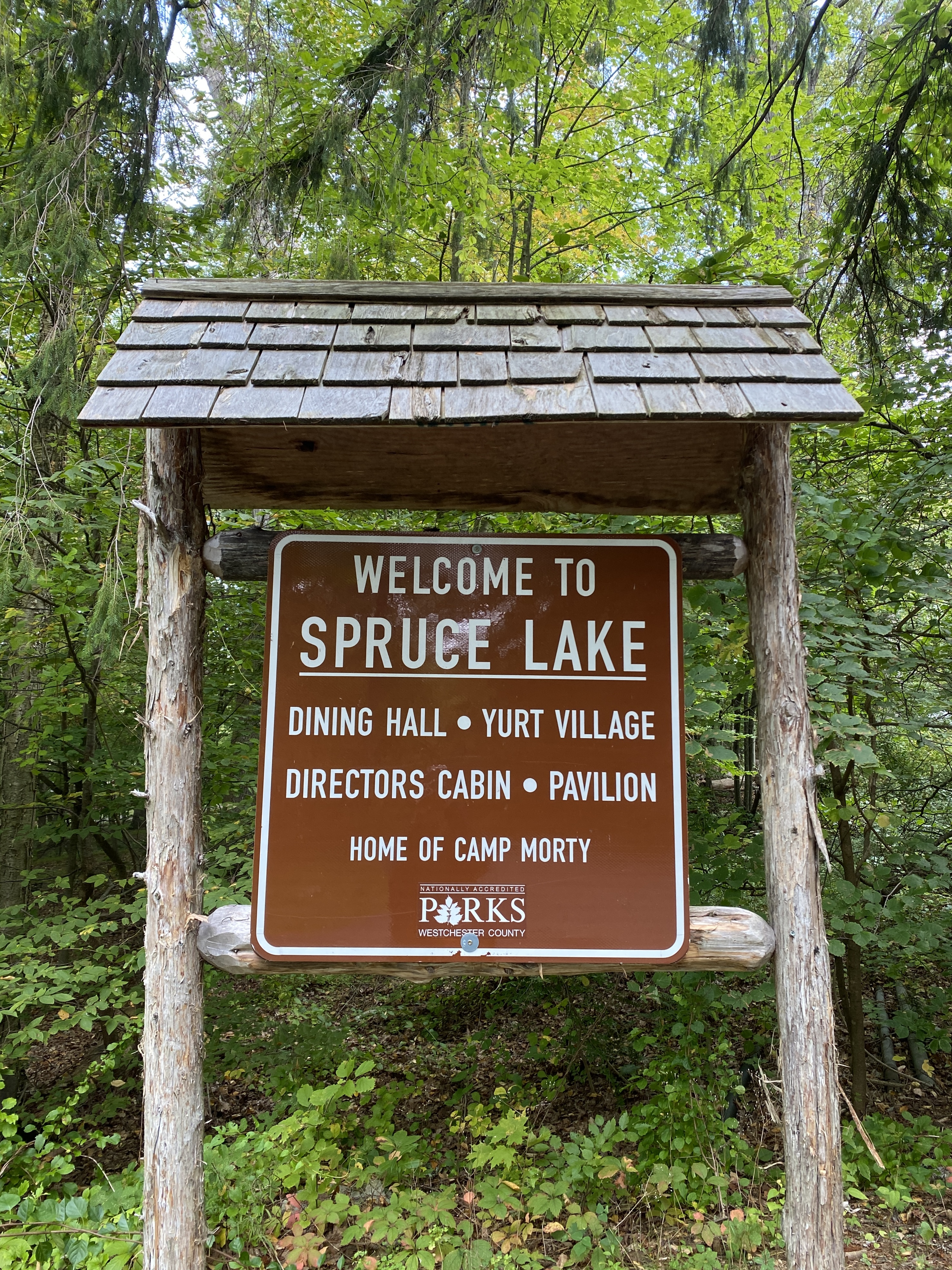
Welcome to Spruce Lake Sign
