= Seabury Brook =

Location
- Country: United States
- State: New York

Physical characteristics
- Mouth: West Canada Creek
  - coordinates: 43°27′06″N 74°48′41″W
  - elevation: 1,598 ft (487 m)

Seabury Brook flows into West Canada Creek a few miles upstream of Nobleboro, New York in Herkimer County, New York. It is located in the Black River Wild Forest.
