= South Lake (Hamilton County, New York) =

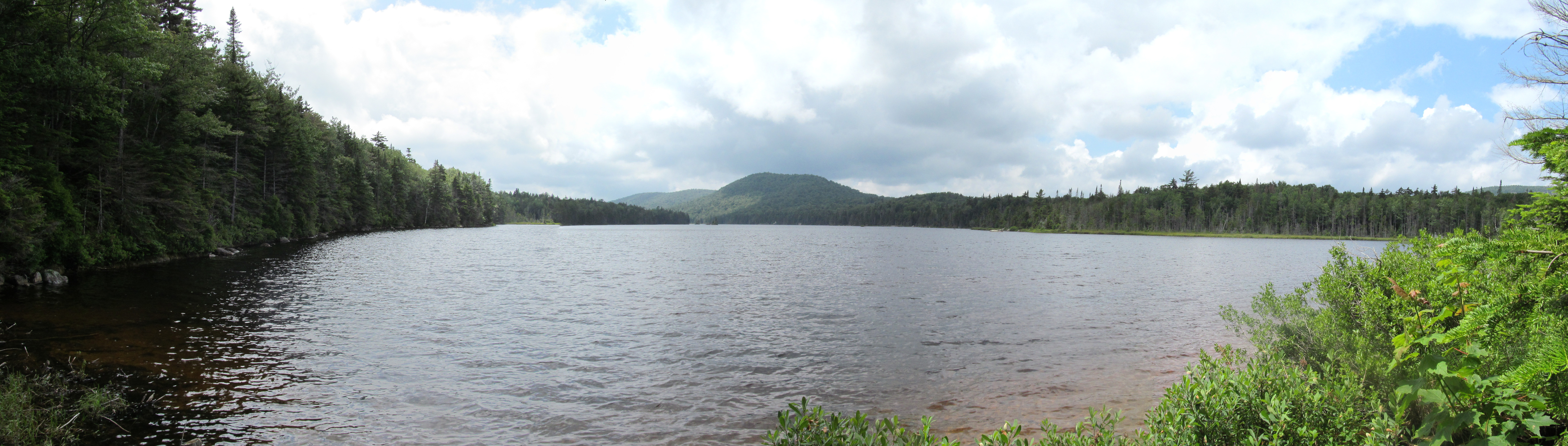
- View of South Lake taken from the Northville-Placid Trail in July 2015.

- Location of the South Lake within New York State South Lake (the United States)
- Location: Hamilton County, New York, United States
- Coordinates: 43°35′10″N 74°37′50″W
- Type: Lake
- Primary outflows: West Canada Creek
- Basin countries: United States
- Surface area: 88 acres (0.36 km^{2})
- Average depth: 10 feet (3.0 m)
- Max. depth: 33 feet (10 m)
- Shore length^{1}: 2.5 miles (4.0 km)
- Surface elevation: 2,356 feet (718 m)
- Islands: 3
- Settlements: Sled Harbor, New York
- ^{1} Shore length is not a well-defined measure.

South Lake is located west of Sled Harbor, New York. Fish species present in the lake are brook trout, black bullhead, and white sucker. There is trail access on the southeast shore. No motors are allowed on this lake. South Lake is one of three of the West Canada Lakes that are the source of West Canada Creek.
