= McCauley Mountain =

McCauley Mountain may refer to:

- McCauley Mountain (New York), a ski resort in New York
- McCauley Mountain (Webb, New York), an elevation in Herkimer County, New York
- McCauley Mountain (Pennsylvania), a mountain in Pennsylvania

== See also ==
- McCauley (disambiguation)
