= Concklin Brook =

Location
- Country: United States
- State: New York

Physical characteristics
- Mouth: West Canada Creek
  - coordinates: 43°21′31″N 74°59′22″W
  - elevation: 1,224 ft (373 m)

Concklin Brook flows into West Canada Creek a few miles east of Hinckley Reservoir in Herkimer County, New York.
