= Fourmile Brook =

Location
- Country: United States
- State: New York

Physical characteristics
- Mouth: West Canada Creek
  - location: Wilmurt, New York
  - coordinates: 43°21′57″N 74°53′21″W
  - elevation: 1,407 ft (429 m)

Fourmile Brook flows into West Canada Creek in Wilmurt in Herkimer County, New York.
