= Stink Lake Mountain =

Mountain in New York, United States

- Location within New York Location within the United States

Highest point
- Elevation: 2,251 feet (686 m)
- Coordinates: 43°38′05″N 74°48′34″W

Geography
- Location: NE of Ohio, New York, U.S.
- Topo map: USGS Limekiln Lake

Stink Lake Mountain is a small mountain range located in Central New York Region of New York located in the Town of Ohio in Herkimer County and Town of Morehouse in Hamilton County, northeast of Ohio. Stink Lake is located south of the elevation.
