= Betty Green Brook =

Location
- Country: United States
- State: New York

Physical characteristics
- Mouth: West Canada Creek
  - coordinates: 43°25′21″N 74°50′03″W
  - elevation: 1,522 ft (464 m)

Betty Green Brook flows into West Canada Creek north of Nobleboro in Herkimer County, New York.
