= Canachagala Mountain =

Mountain in New York, United States

- Location within New York Location within the United States

Highest point
- Elevation: 2,595 feet (791 m)
- Coordinates: 43°35′17″N 74°53′56″W

Geography
- Location: N of Wilmurt, New York, U.S.
- Topo map: USGS Bisby Lakes

Canachagala Mountain is a summit located in Central New York Region of New York located in the Town of Ohio in Herkimer County, north of Wilmurt. Canachagala Lake is located north of Canachagala Mountain.
