= Route 29 Stone Arch Bridge =

- U.S. National Register of Historic Places
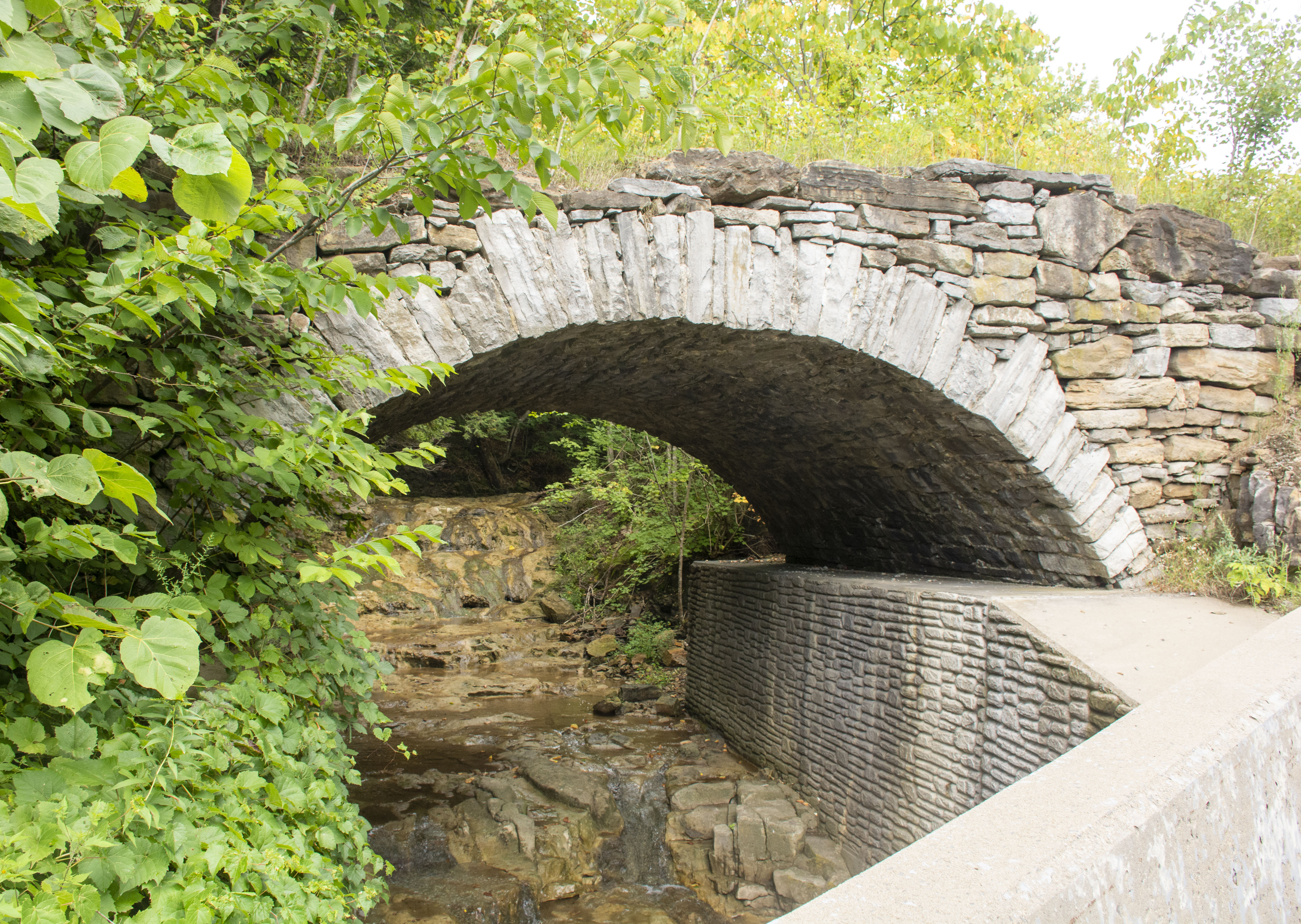

- Location within New York Location within the United States
- Nearest city: Middleville, New York
- Coordinates: 43°8′15″N 74°56′59″W
- Area: less than one acre
- Built: 1870
- Architect: Todd, Charles and Eugene
- NRHP reference No.: 00001685
- Added to NRHP: January 26, 2001

Route 29 Stone Arch Bridge is a historic stone arch bridge located near Middleville in Herkimer County, New York. It was constructed in 1870 and spans the south branch of Maltanner Creek, which empties into West Canada Creek. It is situated on the north side of present New York State Route 29. It is 35 feet long and has a single arch with a span of 20 feet and rise of 12 feet.

It was listed on the National Register of Historic Places in 2001.
