= Whitney Creek =

- Location of the mouth within New York State

Location
- Country: United States
- State: New York

Physical characteristics
- Source: Whitney Lake
  - coordinates: 43°35′52″N 74°32′50″W
- Mouth: Mud Lake
  - coordinates: 43°35′20″N 74°36′38″W
  - elevation: 2,356 ft (718 m)

Whitney Creek drains Whitney Lake and flows west before emptying into Mud Lake in Hamilton County, New York.
