= Beaver Lake (Hamilton County, New York) =

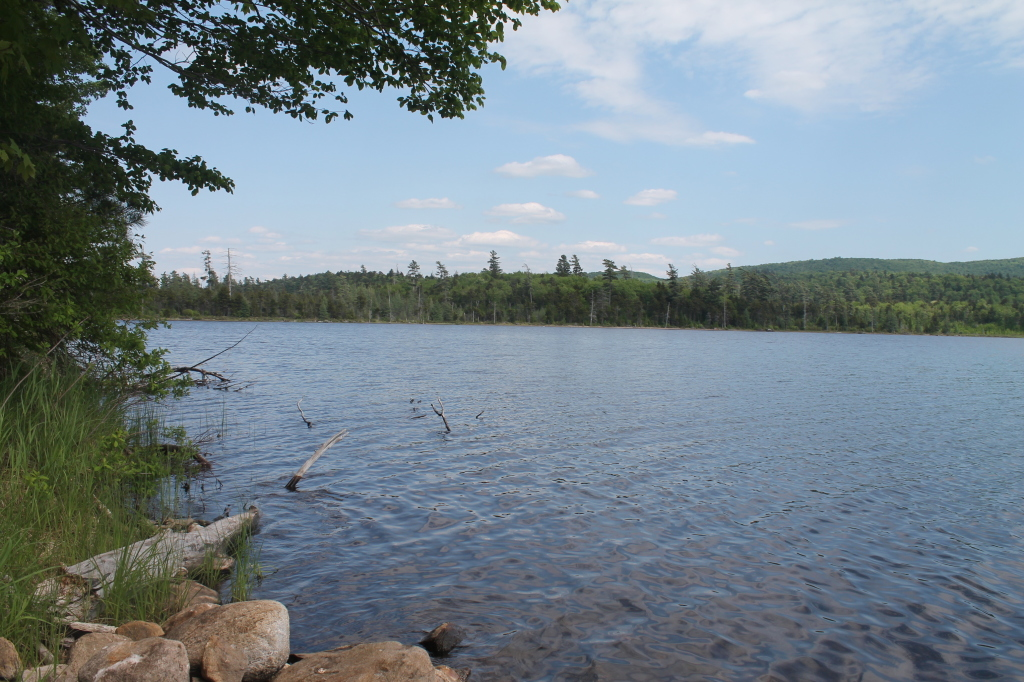
- Beaver Lake in 2012

- Location within New York Beaver Lake (the United States)
- Location: Hamilton County, New York, United States
- Coordinates: 43°38′57″N 74°44′32″W
- Type: Lake
- Basin countries: United States
- Surface area: 142 acres (0.57 km^{2})
- Average depth: 6 feet (1.8 m)
- Max. depth: 16 feet (4.9 m)
- Shore length^{1}: 2.2 miles (3.5 km)
- Surface elevation: 1,834 feet (559 m)
- Settlements: Morehouseville, New York
- ^{1} Shore length is not a well-defined measure.

Beaver Lake is located north of Morehouseville, New York. Fish species present in the lake are brook trout, brown trout, white sucker, black bullhead, and pumpkinseed sunfish. There is a carry down access on the northeast shore off trail. No motors are allowed on this lake.
