= Little Woodhull Lake =

- Location within New York Little Woodhull Lake (the United States)
- Location: Herkimer County, New York
- Coordinates: 43°31′56″N 74°59′29″W
- Type: Lake
- Primary inflows: Clark Brook
- Primary outflows: Little Woodhull Creek
- Basin countries: United States
- Surface area: 79 acres (0.32 km^{2})
- Max. depth: 6 feet (1.8 m)
- Shore length^{1}: 2.2 miles (3.5 km)
- Surface elevation: 1,860 feet (570 m)
- Settlements: Atwell, New York
- ^{1} Shore length is not a well-defined measure.

Little Woodhull Lake is located west of Atwell, New York. Lily Lake is located northwest of the lake, and drains south via an unnamed creek into Little Woodhull Lake. Fish species present in the lake are white sucker, brown bullhead, and brook trout. There is a trail on the east shore off North Lake Road.
