= Mill Creek (Gravesville, New York) =

Location
- Country: United States
- State: New York

Physical characteristics
- Mouth: West Canada Creek
  - location: Gravesville, New York
  - coordinates: 43°14′40″N 75°07′23″W
  - elevation: 702 ft (214 m)

Mill Creek flows into West Canada Creek in Gravesville in Herkimer County, New York, United States.
