= Stony Creek (West Canada Creek tributary) =

River in New York

Location
- Country: United States
- State: New York

Physical characteristics
- Mouth: West Canada Creek
  - location: S of Middleville, New York
  - coordinates: 43°06′51″N 74°58′43″W
  - elevation: 522 ft (159 m)

Stony Creek flows into West Canada Creek south of Middleville in Herkimer County, New York.
