= Cincinnati Creek =

- Location of the mouth within New York Cincinnati Creek (the United States)

Location
- Country: United States
- State: New York
- Region: Central New York
- County: Oneida
- Towns: Steuben, Remsen, Trenton

Physical characteristics
- Source
  - location: Southwest of Alder Creek
  - coordinates: 43°22′54″N 75°16′28″W
  - elevation: Approximately 1,660 ft (510 m)
- Mouth: West Canada Creek
  - location: Mapledale
  - coordinates: 43°14′48″N 75°09′06″W
  - elevation: 709 ft (216 m)
- Basin size: 52.2 sq mi (135 km^{2})

Cincinnati Creek is a river in Oneida County in the state of New York. It begins southwest of the hamlet of Alder Creek, and flows into the West Canada Creek in Mapledale.

== Hydrology ==
The United States Geological Survey (USGS) formally maintained two stream gauges along Cincinnati Creek. One in operation from 1969 to 1970, was located in Remsen. The other was in operation from 1968 to 1970, and was located at Barneveld.

=== Flooding ===
In late June 2010, heavy rain caused major flooding in Remsen. Around six homes and the village library were surrounded by water, which flowed like a river down the streets and sidewalks.

== Recreation ==
In spring 2021, and years in the past, the NYSDEC stocked 1,548 9 to 10 inches (23 to 25 cm) and 172 12 to 15 inches (30 to 38 cm) long brown trout into the creek in the Town of Trenton.
