= Stone Dam Mountain =

Mountain in New York, United States

- Location within New York Location within the United States

Highest point
- Elevation: 1,804 feet (550 m)
- Coordinates: 43°29′44″N 75°03′31″W

Geography
- Location: NW of North Wilmurt, New York, U.S.
- Topo map: USGS North Wilmurt

Stone Dam Mountain is a summit located in Central New York Region of New York located in the Town of Ohio in Herkimer County, northwest of North Wilmurt. Stone Dam Lake is located east of the elevation.
