= Cedar Lake (New York) =

- Location of Cedar Lake within New York Cedar Lake (the United States)
- Location: Hamilton County, New York, United States
- Coordinates: 43°37′08″N 74°33′10″W, 43°37′34″N 74°32′50″W
- Type: Lake
- Primary inflows: Beaver Pond
- Primary outflows: Cedar River
- Basin countries: United States
- Surface area: 439 acres (1.78 km^{2})
- Average depth: 11 feet (3.4 m)
- Max. depth: 40 feet (12 m)
- Shore length^{1}: 6.4 miles (10.3 km)
- Surface elevation: 2,441 feet (744 m)
- Islands: 6
- Settlements: Sled Harbor, New York
- ^{1} Shore length is not a well-defined measure.

Cedar Lake is located northwest of Sled Harbor, New York. Fish species present in the lake are brook trout, black bullhead, and white sucker. There is trail access on the north and west shores from Sled Harbor. There is also trail access to Whitney Lake. No motors are allowed on this lake.

== Tributaries and locations ==
- Beaver Pond – An 87 acre lake that is located to the northwest of the main Cedar Lake. Beaver Pond is connected to Cedar Lake by a channel. It has one unnamed island. Beaver Pond has a maximum depth of 4 feet (1.2 m).
- Goodluck Mountain – A mounted located on the edge of the lake between Pillsbury Bay and Noisey Inlet bay.
- Noisey Inlet – A bay of the lake located near the outlet of the lake.
- Pillsbury Bay – A bay of the lake located by the southern end of the lake.
