= Elm Island =

Island in Hamilton County, New York, USA

- Location within New York

Geography
- Location: Cedar River
- Coordinates: 43°49′56″N 74°14′44″W
- Highest elevation: 1,562 ft (476.1 m)

Administration
- United States
- State: New York
- County: Hamilton
- Town: Indian Lake

Elm Island is an island on Cedar River in Hamilton County, New York.
