= White Creek (West Canada Creek tributary) =

Location
- Country: United States
- State: New York

Physical characteristics
- Mouth: West Canada Creek
  - coordinates: 43°09′53″N 75°00′22″W
  - elevation: 594 ft (181 m)

White Creek flows into West Canada Creek a few miles upstream of Middleville in Herkimer County, New York.
