= Shed Brook =

Location
- Country: United States
- State: New York

Physical characteristics
- Mouth: West Canada Creek
  - location: Newport, New York
  - coordinates: 43°10′09″N 75°00′38″W
  - elevation: 614 ft (187 m)

Shed Brook flows into West Canada Creek by Newport in Herkimer County, New York.
