= Oklahoma Creek (West Canada Creek tributary) =

Location
- Country: United States
- State: New York

Physical characteristics
- Mouth: West Canada Creek
  - location: Newport, New York
  - coordinates: 43°12′49″N 75°02′50″W
  - elevation: 676 ft (206 m)

Oklahoma Creek flows into West Canada Creek in Newport, NYNewport, New York, in Herkimer County.
