= G Lake (New York) =

- Location within New York G Lake (the United States)
- Location: Hamilton County, New York, United States
- Coordinates: 43°24′50″N 74°37′55″W
- Type: Lake
- Primary inflows: Dry Inlet
- Primary outflows: G Lake Outlet
- Basin countries: United States
- Surface area: 88 acres (0.36 km^{2})
- Max. depth: 32 feet (9.8 m)
- Shore length^{1}: 2.3 miles (3.7 km)
- Surface elevation: 2,031 feet (619 m)
- Settlements: Higgins Bay, New York
- ^{1} Shore length is not a well-defined measure.

G Lake is located west of Higgins Bay, New York. Fish species present in the lake are brook trout, and brown trout. There is carry down off trail from G Lake Road along the west shore. The name is derived from the shape of the body of water, which forms something that resembles a letter “G".

== Description ==
There are a few primitive campsites located by the lake. From the summer parking near the barrier, it’s less than half a mile to access the water and campsites. Located here is a clearing, which was the site of a former camp which was privately owned. The remains of a dam is located at the outlet of the lake.

=== Outlet creek ===
G Lake Outlet drains G Lake and flows northwest before emptying into the South Branch West Canada Creek.
