= City Brook (West Canada Creek tributary) =

City Brook Wolf Hollow Creek

Location
- Country: United States
- State: New York

Physical characteristics
- Mouth: West Canada Creek
  - location: Old City, New York
  - coordinates: 43°09′41″N 74°59′35″W
  - elevation: 581 ft (177 m)

City Brook also known as Wolf Hollow Creek flows into West Canada Creek by Old City in Herkimer County, New York.
