= Pico Mountain (New York) =

Mountain in New York, United States

- Location within New York Location within the United States

Highest point
- Elevation: 2,208 feet (673 m)
- Coordinates: 43°39′57″N 74°52′23″W, 43°39′45″N 74°52′49″W

Geography
- Location: NE of Atwell, New York, U.S.
- Topo map: USGS Limekiln Lake

Pico Mountain is a summit located in Central New York Region of New York located in the Town of Ohio in Herkimer County, northeast of Atwell. Burnt Mountain is located north of Pico Mountain.
