= Blue Mountain Wild Forest =

Protected area in New York, United States

- IUCN category V (protected landscape/seascape)
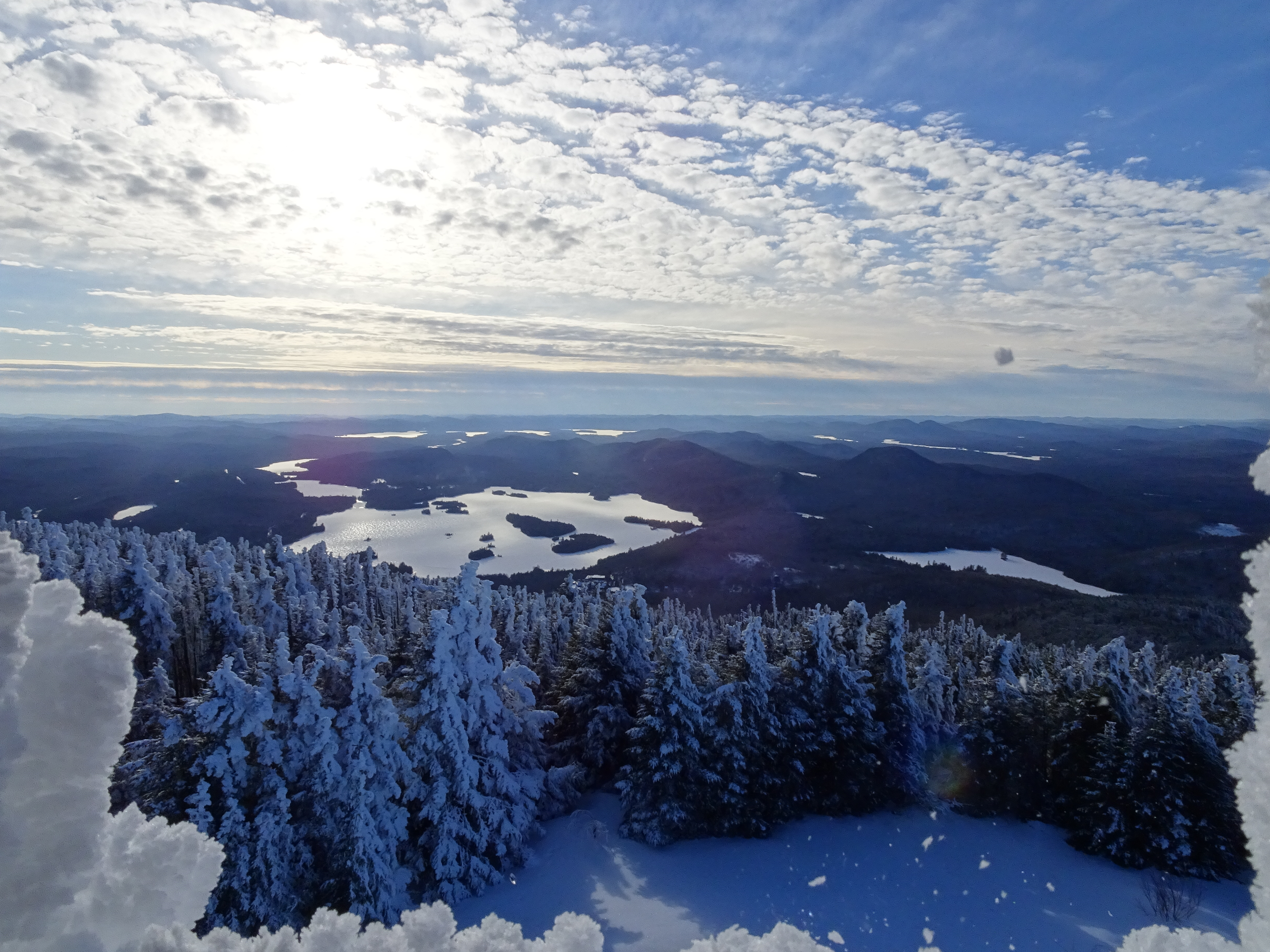

- Location within New York Location within the United States
- Location: Adirondack Park, New York, USA
- Nearest city: Indian Lake, New York
- Coordinates: 43.86°N 74.31°W
- Area: 37,800 acres (153 km^{2})
- Governing body: New York State Department of Environmental Conservation

The 37,800-acre Blue Mountain Wild Forest is part of the Adirondack Forest Preserve.

It is made of five separate sections of acreage in the central Adirondacks. The communities of Indian Lake, Blue Mountain Lake, Long Lake, and Newcomb are located by or within the Blue Mountain Wild Forest. The terrain varies from gentle around Rock Lake to extremely steep and rugged in the Fishing Brook Range. The 3,759-foot Blue Mountain is located in the wild forest and can be seen for some distance around it. The Blue Mountain Fire Observation Station is also located within the wilderness area. The Northville-Placid Trail has a section that runs 15.2 miles through the Blue Mountain Wild Forest.
