= Higley Mountain =

Mountain in New York, United States

- Location within New York Location within the United States

Highest point
- Elevation: 2,438 feet (743 m)
- Coordinates: 43°39′22″N 74°50′02″W

Geography
- Location: NE of Atwell, New York, U.S.
- Topo map: USGS Limekiln Lake

Higley Mountain is a summit located in Central New York Region of New York located in the Town of Ohio in Herkimer County, northeast of Atwell.
