= Horn Lake (New York) =

- Location within New York Horn Lake (the United States)
- Location: Herkimer County, New York, United States
- Coordinates: 43°35′59″N 74°49′08″W
- Type: Lake
- Basin countries: United States
- Surface area: 44 acres (0.18 km^{2})
- Max. depth: 21 feet (6.4 m)
- Shore length^{1}: 1.2 miles (1.9 km)
- Surface elevation: 2,300 feet (700 m)
- Settlements: Forest Lodge, New York
- ^{1} Shore length is not a well-defined measure.

Horn Lake is located north of Forest Lodge, New York. The outlet creek flows into the Indian River. Fish species present in the lake are pumpkinseed sunfish, and brook trout. There is carry down on the northwest shore via trail. No motors are allowed on Horn Lake.
