= Mad Tom Brook =

Location
- Country: United States
- State: New York

Physical characteristics
- Source: Mad Tom Lake
  - location: N of Wilmurt, New York
  - coordinates: 43°24′39″N 74°54′56″W
- Mouth: West Canada Creek
  - location: Wilmurt, New York
  - coordinates: 43°22′38″N 74°56′02″W
  - elevation: 1,280 ft (390 m)

Mad Tom Brook flows into West Canada Creek west of Wilmurt, New York in Herkimer County, New York.
