= Maltanner Creek =

Location
- Country: United States
- State: New York

Physical characteristics
- Mouth: West Canada Creek
  - location: Middleville, New York
  - coordinates: 43°08′18″N 74°58′16″W
  - elevation: 538 ft (164 m)

Maltanner Creek flows into West Canada Creek in Middleville in Herkimer County, New York. The historic Route 29 Stone Arch Bridge crosses the South Branch Maltanner Creek.
