= Little Salmon Lake =

Lake in Herkimer County, New York, United States

- Location within New York Little Salmon Lake (the United States)
- Location: Herkimer County, New York, United States
- Coordinates: 43°29′35″N 74°50′33″W
- Primary outflows: Little Salmon Outlet
- Basin countries: United States
- Surface area: 38 acres (0.15 km^{2})
- Average depth: 5 feet (1.5 m)
- Max. depth: 12 feet (3.7 m)
- Shore length^{1}: 1.1 miles (1.8 km)
- Surface elevation: 2,218 feet (676 m)
- Settlements: Atwell, New York
- ^{1} Shore length is not a well-defined measure.

Little Salmon Lake is located southeast of Atwell, New York. Fish species present in the lake are sunfish, and brook trout. There is a four-wheel drive trail off Haskell Road.
