= Indian River (West Canada Creek tributary) =

Location
- Country: United States
- State: New York

Physical characteristics
- Source: Spruce Lake
  - coordinates: 43.3134°N 74.3654°W
  - elevation: 2,379 ft (725 m)
- Mouth: West Canada Creek
  - coordinates: 43°29′08″N 74°45′18″W
  - elevation: 1,719 ft (524 m)

Basin features
- Tributaries
  - left: Belden Vly

Indian River starts at Spruce Lake and flows into West Canada Creek in Herkimer County, New York.
