= Metcalf Brook =

Location
- Country: United States
- State: New York

Physical characteristics
- Mouth: West Canada Creek
  - coordinates: 43°28′21″N 74°45′57″W
  - elevation: 1,654 ft (504 m)

Metcalf Brook flows into West Canada Creek a few miles upstream of Nobleboro in Hamilton County, New York.
