= Hoffmeister, New York =

- Hamlet
- Location within New York Location within the United States
- Coordinates: 43°23′27″N 74°43′01″W
- Country: United States
- State: New York
- County: Hamilton
- Town: Morehouse
- Elevation: 1,857 ft (566 m)
- Time zone: UTC-5 (Eastern (EST))
  - Summer (DST): UTC-4 (EDT)
- ZIP code: 13353
- Area codes: 315 & 680
- GNIS feature ID: 952932

Hoffmeister is a Hamlet in the town of Morehouse, Hamilton County, New York, United States. The community is located along New York State Route 8, 16.3 miles (26.2 km) west-southwest of Lake Pleasant. Hoffmeister has a post office with ZIP code 13353, which opened on September 19, 1900.
