= Honnedaga Brook =

Stream in New York, United States

Location
- Country: United States
- State: New York

Physical characteristics
- Source: Honnedaga Lake
  - coordinates: 43°29′42″N 74°49′02″W
  - elevation: 2,300 ft (700 m)
- Mouth: West Canada Creek
  - coordinates: 43°28′16″N 74°46′08″W
  - elevation: 1,650 ft (500 m)

Basin features
- Tributaries
  - left: Jones Brook

Honnedaga Brook is a stream in the Adirondack Mountains of the U.S. state of New York. It starts at Honnedaga Lake and flows into West Canada Creek about 7 miles (11 km) upstream of Nobleboro, New York.
