= Cool Mountain =

Mountain in New York, United States

- Location within New York Location within the United States

Highest point
- Elevation: 2,254 feet (687 m)
- Coordinates: 43°31′06″N 74°56′08″W

Geography
- Location: SE of Atwell, New York, U.S.
- Topo map: USGS Bisby Lakes

Cool Mountain is a summit located in Central New York Region of New York located in the town of Ohio in Herkimer County, southeast of Atwell.
