= West Canada Lake Wilderness Area =

Wilderness area in New York, United States

- IUCN category Ib (wilderness area)
- Location within the United States
- Location: Adirondack Park New York USA
- Nearest city: Lake Pleasant, NY
- Coordinates: 43.5903°N 74.6188°W
- Area: 168,920 acres (683.6 km^{2})
- Governing body: New York State Department of Environmental Conservation

The West Canada Lake Wilderness Area is an Adirondack Park Forest Preserve management unit in the State of New York, USA.

The area contains 168 bodies of water covering 2,400 acres (9.7 km^{2}), 78.3 miles (126 km) of foot trails, and 11 lean-tos. The 138-mile (222 km) Northville-Placid Trail traverses it.

== Location ==
The area is located in the town of Ohio in Herkimer County and the towns of Morehouse, Arietta, Lake Pleasant and Indian Lake in Hamilton County. It is bounded on the north by the Moose River Plains area and private lands in the vicinity of Little Moose Lake, Squaw Brook, Snowy Mountain and Squaw Mountain; on the east by NY 30, lands of International Paper and the Spruce Lake-Piseco Lake trail; on the south by private lands north of NY 8, the South Branch of West Canada Creek and an access road to private lands; on the west by West Canada Creek and private lands east of Honnedaga Lake.

== Geography ==
The terrain ranges from swamp flats and rolling hills to steep mountains such as Snowy Mountain. Water drains from the area into three basins: the Hudson, the Mohawk and the Black.

=== Forest ===
The forest cover consists chiefly of mixed hardwood-softwood types with large diameter trees of both types on the more fertile soils. There is also considerable area in spruce-balsam swamp and beaver meadows. Among the spots that attract hikers and campers in addition to the previously mentioned lakes are T Lake Falls and T Lake Mountain, West Canada Creek, Panther Mountain, Snowy Mountain and Cedar River.

=== Water ===
Among the area's chief attributes are its numerous ponds, lakes and streams, most of which support a brook trout population.

== See also ==
- List of Wilderness Areas in the Adirondack Park
