= North Creek (West Canada Creek tributary) =

Location
- Country: United States
- State: New York

Physical characteristics
- Mouth: West Canada Creek
  - location: Herkimer, New York
  - coordinates: 43°04′37″N 74°59′00″W
  - elevation: 459 ft (140 m)

North Creek flows into West Canada Creek north of Herkimer in Herkimer County, New York.
