= Trenton Falls =

Waterfall in New York, United States

Coordinates: 43°16′52″N 75°09′12″W

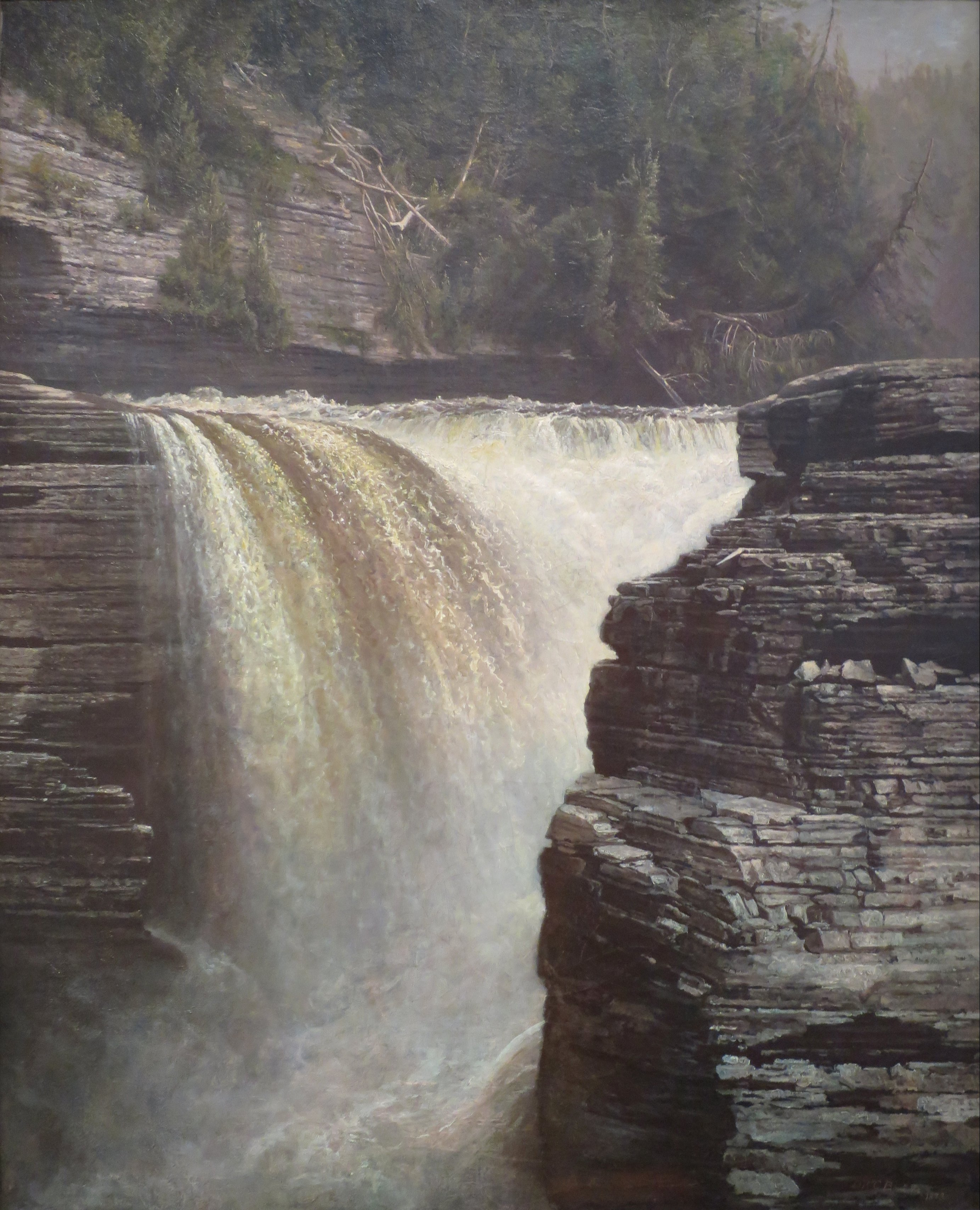
Trenton Falls in 1873

Trenton Falls is a waterfall on West Canada Creek in Trenton, New York. Scenic trails were developed by Brookfield Renewable Power and the Town of Trenton. The falls was and used to produce hydro generated electricity beginning in the early twentieth century, and continues to do so today.

== Geology ==
Trenton Falls is approximately 150 feet high. It is situated on the West Canada Creek 13 miles North East of Utica, New York and flows into the Mohawk River. The limestone in the falls contains fossils, and some locals sell them to visitors. The fossils include: Concularia (an ancient “armored” jellyfish), echinoderms (spiny-skinned creatures including starfish and crinoids, or sea stars), cephalopods (shelled mollusks with squid-like tentacles), gastropods (snails), and bryozoans (tiny moss animals)." Trenton Falls also has an abundance of limestone deposits. Since the late 19th century, limestone has contributed to the economy of upstate New York.

== Trails ==
The scenic trails consist of the primary trail (stone dust), which leads tourists to the Trenton Falls Hydro Dam overlook, and the secondary trails (wood mulch), which leads tourists along the gorge. Near the dam, there is a collection of rocks in the water that is accessible to visitors by a winding trail that leads from the adjacent bridge. This specific part of Trenton Falls attracts swimmers, anglers, and photographers.

== History ==
The Haudenosaunee called the falls Ka-na-ta-dork ("brown water") or Kuy-a-ho-ra ("slanting water").

In 1805, John Sherman was the first known non-indigenous person to see the falls. With funds from Joseph Bonaparte, a pathway to Trenton Falls was created. In 1822, Sherman and his collaborator, Jarvis Phelps, bought 60 acres of land from the Holland Land Company but in 1823 Phelps was bought out by Sherman and the Rural Resort was started. In 1825, the Rural Resort expanded to host overnight guests. While visiting, a tourist named Michael Moore fell into the gorge and acquired a crippling leg injury. Maria, Sherman's daughter, took care of him and In 1831, Moore and Maria were married and acquired the resort. In 1863, the United States Secretary of State, William H. Seward, held a meeting of diplomats at the Trenton Falls Hotel.

"Once a vacation spot for the country's elite, the falls were all but closed to the public for 100 years by the various power companies that used the waterway to generate electricity." Utica Electric Light & Power Company received Moore's Hotel and surrounding land in 1897. Because of the creation of the hydroelectric powerhouse and the dam in 1899, the City of Utica, New York was able to receive electricity from Trenton Falls in 1901.

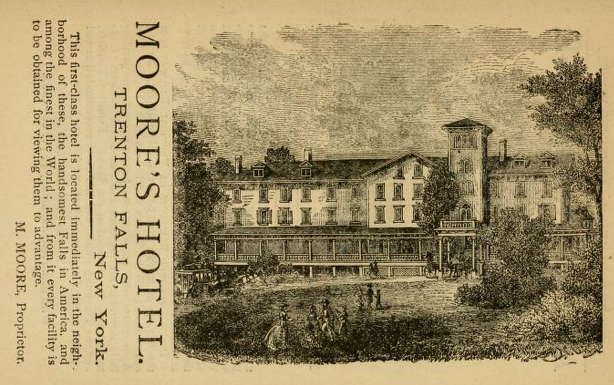
Moores Hotel in 1876

After the infrastructure of the Trenton Falls Hotel failed, the building was destroyed in 1945. In 1950, Niagara Mohawk Power Company bought the hydropower plant. Reconstruction of the building was completed in 1984. Orion Power bought the Niagara Mohawk hydro facilities at Trenton Falls in 1999 and in 2002, Reliant Energy joined Orion Power. In 2004, Reliant Energy hydro facilities and Trenton Falls were bought by Brascan Power, known now as Brookfield Power.

== In Literature ==
Lydia Sigourney's poem Trenton Falls was published in 1845 in her volume Scenes in my Native Land. In her accompanying notes she highly recommends paying them a visit, whilst at the same time commenting on their dangers and on those who have fallen in and died.

== Climate ==
Climate data for Trenton Falls, New York (1991-2020 normals)
| Month | Jan | Feb | Mar | Apr | May | Jun | Jul | Aug | Sep | Oct | Nov | Dec | Year |
|---|---|---|---|---|---|---|---|---|---|---|---|---|---|
| Mean daily maximum °C (°F) | 29.4 (−1.4) | 31.4 (−0.3) | 39.4 (4.1) | 53.8 (12.1) | 66.7 (19.3) | 74.3 (23.5) | 79.3 (26.3) | 77.8 (25.4) | 70.8 (21.6) | 58.6 (14.8) | 46.2 (7.9) | 34.6 (1.4) | 55.2 (12.9) |
| Daily mean °C (°F) | 19.9 (−6.7) | 22.0 (−5.6) | 29.9 (−1.2) | 43.9 (6.6) | 55.5 (13.1) | 63.9 (17.7) | 68.9 (20.5) | 67.5 (19.7) | 60.2 (15.7) | 49.1 (9.5) | 37.7 (3.2) | 26.8 (−2.9) | 45.4 (7.4) |
| Mean daily minimum °C (°F) | 10.4 (−12.0) | 12.7 (−10.7) | 20.4 (−6.4) | 34.0 (1.1) | 44.3 (6.8) | 53.4 (11.9) | 58.5 (14.7) | 57.2 (14.0) | 49.6 (9.8) | 39.7 (4.3) | 29.1 (−1.6) | 19.1 (−7.2) | 35.7 (2.1) |
| Average rainfall mm (inches) | 3.58 (91) | 3.43 (87) | 3.45 (88) | 4.01 (102) | 4.64 (118) | 4.78 (121) | 4.95 (126) | 4.28 (109) | 4.15 (105) | 5.34 (136) | 4.36 (111) | 4.41 (112) | 51.38 (1,305) |

== See also ==
- List of waterfalls
- Niagara Falls
