= West Creek Lake =

Lake located south of Hoffmeister, New York

- Location within New York West Creek Lake (the United States)
- Location: Hamilton County, New York, United States
- Coordinates: 43°17′52″N 74°42′21″W
- Type: Lake
- Basin countries: United States
- Surface area: 12 acres (0.049 km^{2})
- Average depth: 5 feet (1.5 m)
- Max. depth: 17 feet (5.2 m)
- Shore length^{1}: .7 miles (1.1 km)
- Surface elevation: 2,113 feet (644 m)
- Settlements: Hoffmeister, New York
- ^{1} Shore length is not a well-defined measure.

West Creek Lake is located south of Hoffmeister, New York. Fish species present in the lake are brook trout, and sunfish. There is trail access to the lake.
