= Mill Brook (West Canada Creek tributary) =

Location
- Country: United States
- State: New York

Physical characteristics
- Mouth: West Canada Creek
  - location: Herkimer, New York
  - coordinates: 43°03′02″N 74°59′10″W
  - elevation: 410 ft (120 m)

Mill Brook flows into West Canada Creek north of Herkimer in Herkimer County, New York.
