= Ice Cave Mountain =

Mountain in New York, United States

- Location within New York Location within the United States

Highest point
- Elevation: 2,680 feet (820 m)
- Coordinates: 43°35′37″N 74°52′02″W, 43°35′11″N 74°52′46″W

Geography
- Location: N of Wilmurt, New York, U.S.
- Topo map: USGS Honnedaga Lakes

Ice Cave Mountain is a summit located in Central New York Region of New York located in the Town of Ohio in Herkimer County, north of Wilmurt. The east side of the elevation drains into Ice Cave Creek.
