= Bochen Lake =

- Location within New York Bochen Lake (the United States)
- Location: Hamilton County, New York, United States
- Coordinates: 43°21′39″N 74°45′19″W
- Type: Lake
- Basin countries: United States
- Surface area: 29 acres (0.12 km^{2})
- Average depth: 10 feet (3.0 m)
- Max. depth: 33 feet (10 m)
- Shore length^{1}: 1.3 miles (2.1 km)
- Surface elevation: 1,998 feet (609 m)
- Settlements: Morehouseville, New York
- ^{1} Shore length is not a well-defined measure.

Bochen Lake is located south of Morehouseville, New York. The fish species present in the lake includes brook trout and brown trout. There is trail access on the west shore.
