= Blue Ridge Wilderness Area =

Wilderness area in the Adirondacks, New York

- IUCN category Ib (wilderness area)
- Location within the United States
- Location: Adirondack Park New York USA
- Nearest city: Blue Mountain Lake, NY
- Coordinates: 43°46′50″N 74°34′11″W
- Area: 47,177 acres (19,092 ha)
- Governing body: New York State Department of Environmental Conservation

The Blue Ridge Wilderness Area, a unit of New York's Forest Preserve in the Adirondack Park, is located in the towns of Arietta, Lake Pleasant and Indian Lake in Hamilton County. It is roughly bounded on the north by NY 28; on the east by Route 28 and private lands immediately west of this route; on the south by private lands immediately north and west of Cedar River Flow; and on the west by the Lake Kora and Sagamore Lake properties and the South Inlet of Raquette Lake. It contains 19 bodies of water covering 275 acres (1.1 km^{2}) and features 15 miles (24 km) of foot trails and three lean-tos.

== Geography ==
It is dominated by Blue Ridge, a height of land ranging from 2,700 to 3,497 feet (823 to 1,066 m) in elevation and running in a general east-west direction for a distance of more than six miles. On the lower north slopes of the ridge there are a number of attractive little trout ponds with foot trails leading to them from Route 28. The forest cover is typical mixed hardwood-softwood types with the higher elevations predominantly covered with spruce and balsam. Most of the old growth spruce and hemlock suffered heavy damage in the 1950 blow down, which affects the character of the area even to this day.

== Recreation ==
The Blue Ridge Wilderness is easily accessible along most of its perimeter. A portion of the 138-mile (222 km) Northville-Placid Trail runs from the south boundary northward to the vicinity of Stephens Pond and Lake Durant. Campers from the Lake Durant public campground make use of the trails in that vicinity while the chief use of the foot trails in the Wilson Pond section appears to be by fishermen, hunters and summer visitors to the community of Blue Mountain Lake.

== See also ==
- List of Wilderness Areas in the Adirondack Park
