= Golden Stair Mountain =

Mountain in New York, United States

- Location within New York Location within the United States

Highest point
- Elevation: 2,405 feet (733 m)
- Coordinates: 43°34′30″N 74°56′21″W

Geography
- Location: N of Atwell, New York, U.S.
- Topo map: USGS Bisby Lakes

Golden Stair Mountain is a summit located in Central New York Region of New York located in the Town of Ohio in Herkimer County, north of Atwell.
