= Shaker Mountain Wild Forest =

- IUCN category Ib (wilderness area)
- Interactive map of Shaker Mountain Wild Forest
- Location: Adirondack Park New York USA
- Nearest city: Lake Pleasant, New York
- Coordinates: 43.19°N 74.36°W
- Area: 40,527 acres (164.01 km^{2})
- Governing body: New York State Department of Environmental Conservation

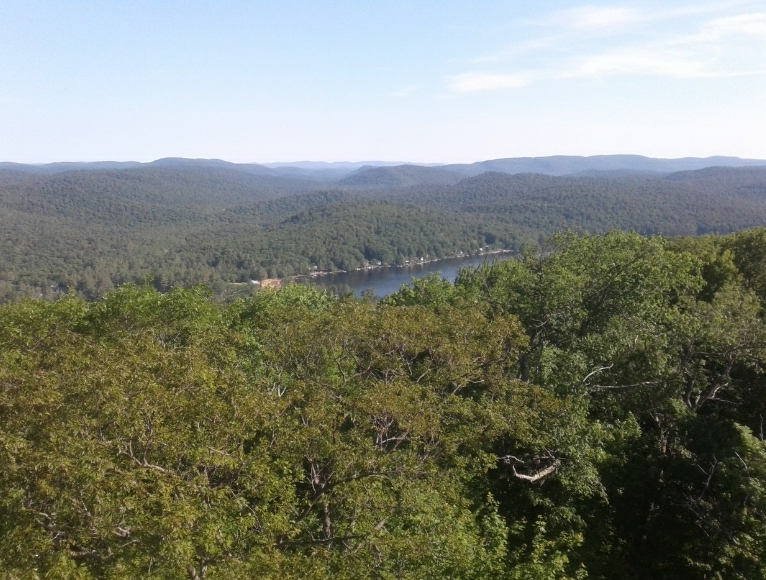
Partial view of Pine Lake (Fulton County, New York) from top of Kane Mountain

The Shaker Mountain Wild Forest, an Adirondack Park unit of the Forest Preserve, is located in the towns of Northampton, Mayfield, Bleecker, and Caroga in Fulton County and the Town of Benson in Hamilton County. The southern terminus of the Northville-Placid Trail (NPT) is located at the trailhead in Waterfront Park in the Village of Northville.

== Recreation ==
There are miles of trails for hiking, biking, horseback riding, snowshoeing, cross-country skiing, and snowmobiling. There are also lakes and ponds that are open to fishing, ice fishing, and paddling. The Kane Mountain Fire Tower, located within the area, provides "spectacular views of the surrounding areas lands and waters".

== See also ==
- List of Wilderness Areas in the Adirondack Park
