= Moose River Plains Wild Forest =

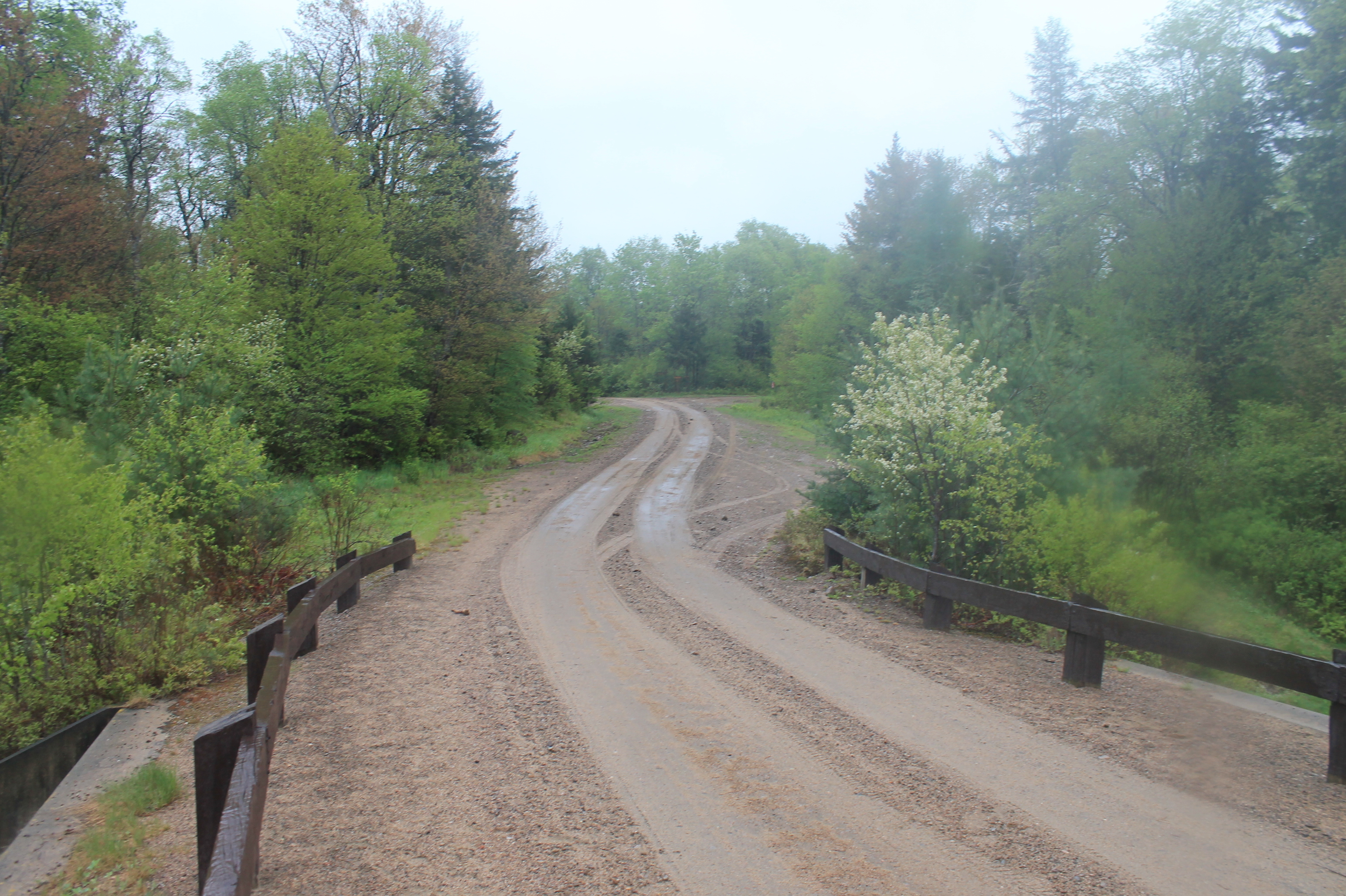
- Road through Moose River Plains crossing the South Branch of Moose River
- Interactive map of Moose River Plains Wild Forest
- Location: New York, United States
- Area: 100.5 sq mi (260 km^{2})

The Moose River Plains Wild Forest is a 64,322-acre (100.5 sq mi; 260.3 km^{2}) tract in the Adirondack Park in Hamilton and Herkimer counties in the state of New York in the United States of America; it is designated as Wild Forest by the New York State Department of Environmental Conservation.

== Geography ==
Moose River Plains Wild Forest is bounded on the north by the Pigeon Lake Wilderness Area, Raquette Lake and the Blue Ridge Wilderness Area, on the east and the south by the West Canada Lake Wilderness Area and the private lands of the Adirondack League Club, and on the west by the Fulton Chain Lakes and New York State Route 28.

The "plains" of the Moose and Red Rivers are zones of grass and herbaceous vegetation that contrast with the forest that covers much of the Adirondack Park.

Streams within the forest include one of several Indian Rivers in the Adirondack park (originating at Brook Trout Lake in the West Canada Lake Wilderness), the Red River, Cobblestone Creek, Mountain Lake Outlet, Horn Lake Outlet, Ice Cave Mountain Outlet, Benedict Brook, Muskrat Creek, Silver Run, Otter Brook, Twin Lakes Outlet, the headwaters of the North Branch of the Black River (beginning over the hill behind Horn Lake), the South Branch of the Moose River and the 675-acre (2.73 km^{2}) Cedar River Flow, as well as Mitchell Ponds, Lost Ponds, Twin Lakes, Icehouse and Helldiver Ponds, Beaver Lake, Indian Lake (referred to as Little Indian Lake locally), Squaw Lake, Balsam Lake, Stink Lake, Mountain Lake, Monument Lake, Snyder Lake, and furthest in, Horn Lake. This is the area in which the Adirondack Guide, French Louie, ran many of his traplines.

== Recreation ==
The Moose River Plains Wild Forest has miles of marked trails for hiking, skiing, mountain biking, horseback riding, and snowmobiling, along with many lakes and ponds for canoeing and kayaking. Hunting, fishing and primitive camping are permitted during designated seasons. Some trails and campsites have been improved to allow greater access for those with disabilities.

== Public access ==
This area is the largest block of remote lands in the Adirondacks readily accessible by motor vehicle. Entrances to the Plains are at the Limekiln Gate, near Inlet, and the Cedar River Gate, near Indian Lake. The gates are connected by Limekiln Lake-Cedar River Road, a 23-mile (37 km) unpaved road. It functions as a snowmobile route during winter. In June the road comprises much of the course for the Black Fly Challenge, an annual cycle race.

== See also ==
- List of New York wild forests
