= North Lake (New York) =

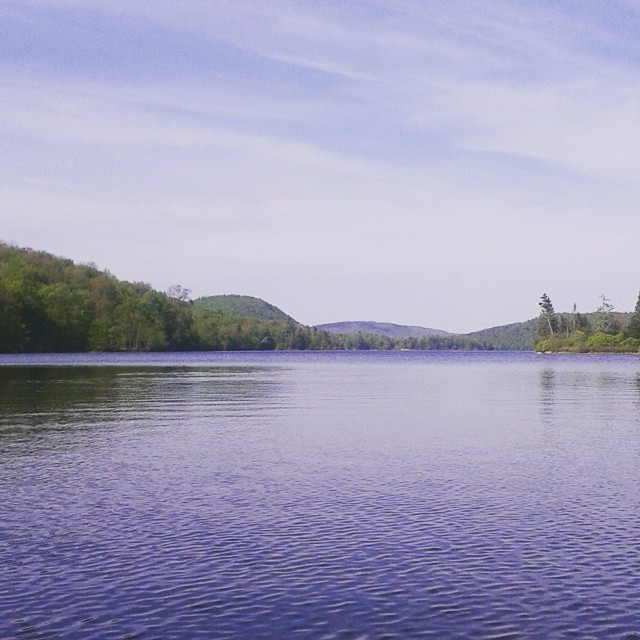
- North Lake in 2015

- Location within New York North Lake (the United States)
- Location: Herkimer County, New York, United States
- Coordinates: 43°32′18″N 74°55′41″W
- Type: Lake
- Primary inflows: Middle Branch Black River, Jocks Brook, Ice Cave Creek, North Branch Black River
- Primary outflows: Black River
- Catchment area: 19,840 acres (8,030 ha)
- Basin countries: United States
- Max. length: 4.5 miles (7.2 km)
- Surface area: 432 acres (1.75 km^{2})
- Average depth: 19 feet (5.8 m)
- Max. depth: 58 feet (18 m)
- Shore length^{1}: 10.9 miles (17.5 km)
- Surface elevation: 1,821 feet (555 m)
- Islands: 8
- Settlements: Atwell, New York
- ^{1} Shore length is not a well-defined measure.

North Lake is a lake located by Atwell, New York and is the source of the Black River. North Lake is one of several lakes in Herkimer County that has a medium acid content, and is therefore not a big fish producer. The fish species present are tiger muskie, white sucker, perch, and bullhead. Boating is permitted, limited to a small gravel based boat launch in Atwell.

The 11,490-acre North Lake Easement Tract (also known as the J.P. Lewis Tract), is located in the Town of Ohio in Herkimer County. It is currently owned by Heartwood Forestry Fund. The tract surrounds the northern portion of North Lake and is bounded by the Black River Wild Forest on the southwest and the West Canada Lakes Wilderness on the northeast. The tract has the same rolling topography and features characteristic of adjacent forest preserve lands. Besides the lake, the tract includes numerous creeks, brooks and ponds. 2,606-foot Canachagala Mountain and 2,391-foot Golden Stair Mountain are located in the northwestern portion of the tract. NOTE: The public is prohibited from trespassing on the private property exclusion areas around the 35 camps on the North Lake Easement Tract.
