= Silver Lake Wilderness Area =

Wilderness area in New York, United States

- IUCN category Ib (wilderness area)
- Location within the United States
- Location: Adirondack Park, New York, USA
- Nearest city: Lake Pleasant, NY
- Coordinates: 43°17′41″N 74°25′47″W
- Area: 106,770 acres (43,210 ha)
- Established: 1972
- Governing body: New York State Department of Environmental Conservation

The Silver Lake Wilderness Area, an Adirondack Park unit of the Forest Preserve, is located in the towns of Lake Pleasant, Benson, Wells and Arietta in Hamilton County. The park is roughly bounded on the north by NY 8 and private lands near Piseco Lake, Oxbow Lake, Hamilton Lake, Sand Lake and Lake Pleasant; on the east by NY 30; on the south generally by the Hamilton County line; and on the west by NY 10, the West Branch of the Sacandaga River and the Piseco Outlet.

The area contains 48 bodies of water covering 569 acres (2.3 km^{2}), 26.5 miles (42.6 km) of foot trails, and 3 lean-tos.

== Geography ==
The terrain is relatively low with rolling hills and only four mountain tops that exceed 3,000 feet (910 m) elevation. There is a considerable area of conifer swamp as well as some beaver meadows along the streams.

=== Forest ===
The forest cover is chiefly mixed hardwoods and softwoods with some stands of nearly pure hemlock in large diameter size. In the swamp area along streams and at the higher elevations around the mountain tops, the forest cover runs predominantly to spruce and balsam.

=== Water ===
Silver Lake is the principal attraction near the center of this area, chiefly for brook trout fishermen. Mud Lake, Rock Lake and Loomis Pond are also popular trout fishing spots. Big Eddy on the West Branch of the Sacandaga River and Cathead Mountain also attracts visitors to the area.

== Recreation ==
The area is suitable for hiking and backpacking. The Northville-Placid Trail has its southern terminus in Benson at the southern edge of the area and runs through the center in a northerly direction, crossing the northern boundary near Piseco Lake. There is also a canoe trail that can be paddled.

== See also ==
- List of Wilderness Areas in the Adirondack Park
