= Ohio, New York =

- Town
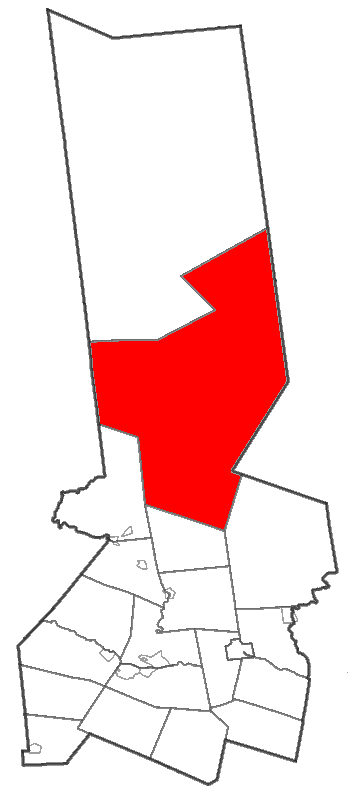
- Location within Herkimer County

- Location within New York Location within the United States
- Coordinates: 43°25′31″N 74°56′39″W
- Country: United States
- State: New York
- County: Herkimer

Government
  - Type: Town Council
  - Town Supervisor: Dennis Bussey
  - Town Council: Members' List: • George J. Lawson (R); • Edward Luther (R); • David Mower (R); • Gordon A. Roark (R)

Area
  - Total: 307.57 sq mi (796.6 km^{2})
  - Land: 301.33 sq mi (780.4 km^{2})
  - Water: 6.24 sq mi (16.2 km^{2})
- Elevation: 2,119 ft (646 m)

Population (2020)
  - Total: 962
  - Density: 3.19/sq mi (1.23/km^{2})
- Time zone: UTC-5 (Eastern (EST))
  - Summer (DST): UTC-4 (EDT)
- ZIP Codes: 13324 (Ohio); 13338 (Forestport); 13420 (Old Forge); 13438 (Remsen)
- Area code: 315
- FIPS code: 36-043-54507
- GNIS feature ID: 0979302
- Website: www.townofohionewyork.com

Ohio is a town in Herkimer County, New York, United States. The population was 962 as of the 2020 census. The town is named after the state of Ohio. The town is in the northern part of the county and northeast of Utica. Part of Ohio is within the Adirondack Park.

== History ==
The town of Ohio was established as the town of West Brunswick in 1823 from part of the town of Norway. The name was changed to Ohio in 1836. That same year, a portion of the town was annexed to the now defunct town of Wilmurt.

== Geography ==
According to the United States Census Bureau, the town has a total area of 307.6 square miles (796.7 km^{2}), of which 301.3 square miles (780.4 km^{2}) are land and 6.2 square miles (16.1 km^{2}), or 2.03%, are water.

The eastern town line is the border of Hamilton County, and the western town line is the border of Oneida County.

West Canada Creek, a tributary of the Mohawk River, crosses the town from east to west, entering the Hinckley Reservoir near the western town border. The South Branch of the Moose River, part of the St. Lawrence River watershed, crosses the northern end of the town from east to west.

New York State Route 8 is a north–south highway in Ohio. New York State Route 365 runs along the north side of West Canada Creek before intersecting NY-8.

== Demographics ==
Historical population
Census	Pop.	Note	%±
1830	713		—
1840	692		−2.9%
1850	1,051		51.9%
1860	1,135		8.0%
1870	1,009		−11.1%
1880	961		−4.8%
1890	832		−13.4%
1900	660		−20.7%
1910	527		−20.2%
1920	583		10.6%
1930	457		−21.6%
1940	460		0.7%
1950	547		18.9%
1960	480		−12.2%
1970	468		−2.5%
1980	788		68.4%
1990	880		11.7%
2000	922		4.8%
2010	1,002		8.7%
2020	962		−4.0%
U.S. Decennial Census

As of the census of 2000, there were 922 people, 349 households, and 255 families residing in the town. The population density was 3.0 inhabitants per square mile (1.2/km^{2}). There were 974 housing units at an average density of 3.2 per square mile (1.2/km^{2}). The racial makeup of the town was 96.96% White, 0.54% African American, 1.41% Native American, 0.11% Asian, 0.54% from other races, and 0.43% from two or more races. Hispanic or Latino of any race were 0.54% of the population.

There were 349 households, out of which 35.2% had children under the age of 18 living with them, 60.7% were married couples living together, 8.0% had a female householder with no husband present, and 26.9% were non-families. 20.9% of all households were made up of individuals, and 6.6% had someone living alone who was 65 years of age or older. The average household size was 2.64 and the average family size was 3.06.

In the town, the population was spread out, with 26.7% under the age of 18, 6.8% from 18 to 24, 29.0% from 25 to 44, 27.3% from 45 to 64, and 10.2% who were 65 years of age or older. The median age was 38 years. For every 100 females, there were 104.9 males. For every 100 females age 18 and over, there were 107.4 males.

The median income for a household in the town was $29,813, and the median income for a family was $36,667. Males had a median income of $25,625 versus $22,153 for females. The per capita income for the town was $13,641. About 18.7% of families and 20.9% of the population were below the poverty line, including 26.2% of those under age 18 and 30.7% of those age 65 or over.

== Communities and locations in Ohio ==
=== Communities and inhabited locations ===
- Atwell – A hamlet in the center of the town, located at the southern end of North Lake, named for local hermit Atwell Martin.
- Bull Hill – A hamlet in the southeastern corner of the town on County Road 129.
- Gray – A hamlet on the southern town line.
- Nobleboro – A hamlet on NY Route 8 near the Hamilton County border.
- North Wilmurt – A hamlet in the west-central part of the town.
- Ohio – A hamlet on NY-8 in the south-central part of the town. It was formerly called "Ohio City" and "Dutch Settlement."
- Wilmurt Corners – A hamlet in the eastern part of the town, south of Route 8, located on County Road 69.

=== Geographical and similar locations ===
- Ash Ridge – An elevation located west of Forty Mountain.
- Breezy Knoll – An elevation located north of Bull Hill.
- Canachagala Lake – A lake located on the western town line, Partially in the Town of Webb.
- Canachagala Mountain – A mountain located east of Canachagala Lake.
- Chub Pond – A lake located northwest of North Wilmurt.
- Cool Mountain – A mountain located southeast of Atwell.
- Finn Hill – An elevation located northwest of North Wilmurt.
- Forest Lodge – A location at the eastern end of Honnedaga Lake.
- Fort Noble Mountain – An elevation located northeast of Nobleboro. Partially in the Town of Morehouse.
- Forty Mountain – An elevation located north of Party Hill.
- Golden Stair Mountain – An elevation located north of Atwell.
- Green Lake – A lake located north of Atwell.
- Hedgehog Mountain – An elevation located northeast of Bull Hill.
- Herkimer County High Point – An elevation that is the highest point in Herkimer County.
- Herkimer Landing – A location at the southeastern end of Honnedaga Lake.
- Higley Mountain – An elevation located northeast of Atwell.
- Hinckley Reservoir – A reservoir on the southern town line.
- Honnedaga – A historic location in the town.
- Honnedaga Lake – A lake in the northern part of Ohio.
- Horn Lake – A lake located north of Forest Lodge.
- Ice Cave Mountain – A mountain located east of Canachagala Lake.
- Lawson Top – An elevation located north-northeast of Wilmurt.
- Limekiln Lake – A lake partly in Ohio, in the northwestern corner.
- Little Salmon Lake – A lake located east of the hamlet of Atwell.
- Little Woodhull Lake – A lake located west of the hamlet of Atwell.
- McCauley Mountain – An elevation located north of Wilmurt.
- McIntosh Bridge – A historic location in the town.
- North Lake – A lake near the northern town line, northwest of South Lake.
- Panther Mountain – A mountain located north of Atwell.
- Party Hill – An elevation located east-northeast of Ohio.
- Pico Mountain – An elevation located northeast of Atwell.
- Raymond Hills – A set of elevations located south of Honnedaga Lake.
- Round Top – An elevation located north-northeast of Wilmurt.
- South Lake – A lake southwest of Honnedaga Lake.
- Stink Lake Mountain – A mountain located northeast of Atwell.
- Stone Dam Lake – A lake located northwest of North Wilmurt.
- Stone Dam Mountain – An elevation located northwest of North Wilmurt.
- Sugarloaf Mountain – An elevation located north of North Lake.
- Twin Lakes – Two small lakes located northeast of North Wilmurt.
- Twin Lakes
- Woodin Corners – A location near the southern town line.

== See also ==
- Herkimer County Historical Society
