= Whitney Lake (New York) =

- Location within New York Whitney Lake (the United States)
- Location: Hamilton County, New York, United States
- Coordinates: 43°35′20″N 74°33′49″W
- Type: Lake
- Primary outflows: Whitney Creek
- Basin countries: United States
- Surface area: 110 acres (0.45 km^{2})
- Average depth: 11 feet (3.4 m)
- Max. depth: 40 feet (12 m)
- Shore length^{1}: 2.7 miles (4.3 km)
- Surface elevation: 2,467 feet (752 m)
- Islands: 2
- Settlements: Sled Harbor, New York
- ^{1} Shore length is not a well-defined measure.

Whitney Lake is located west of Sled Harbor, New York. Fish species present in the lake are brook trout, and black bullhead. There is trail access on the east shore from Cedar Lake. No motors are allowed on this lake.
