= Cedar River (New York) =

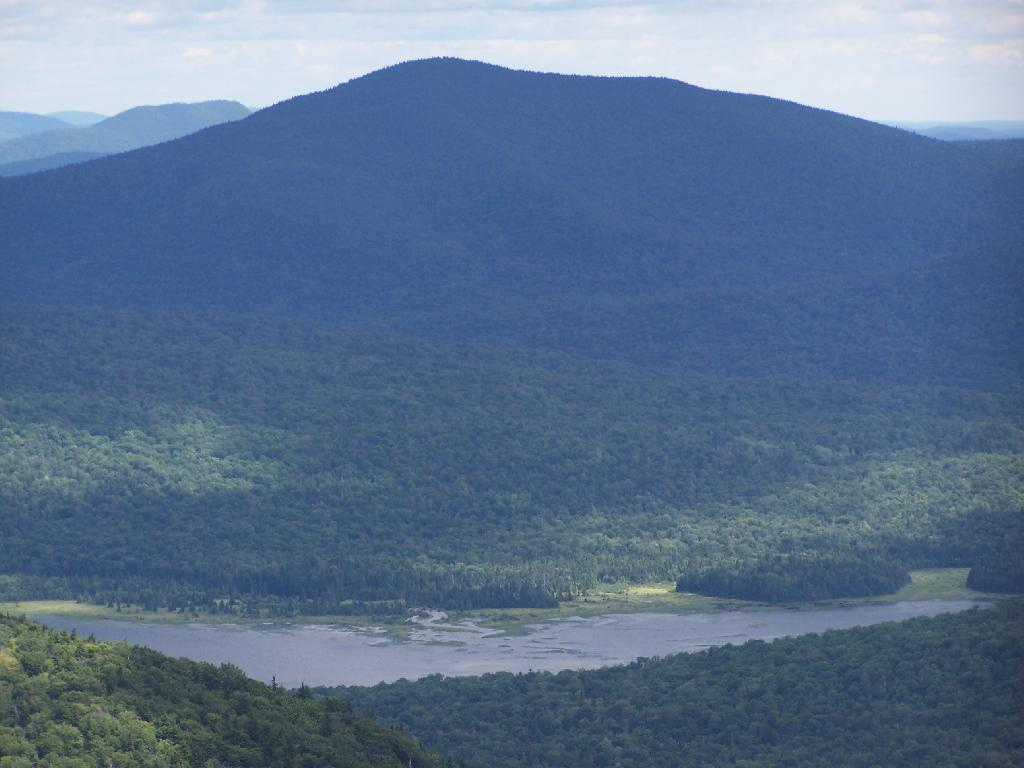
- Cedar River from the Wakley Mountain Fire Tower

- Location of the mouth of the Cedar River Cedar River (New York) (the United States)

Location
- Country: United States
- State: New York
- Region: Adirondacks
- Counties: Hamilton, Essex
- Towns: Arietta, Lake Pleasant, Indian Lake, Minerva, Newcomb

Physical characteristics
- Source: Cedar Lake
  - location: Town of Arietta
  - coordinates: 43°37′40″N 74°32′18″W
  - elevation: 2,441 ft (744 m)
- Mouth: Hudson River
  - location: NE of Indian Lake (hamlet)
  - coordinates: 43°51′12″N 74°11′19″W
  - elevation: 1,463 ft (446 m)
- Length: 38.5 mi (62.0 km)

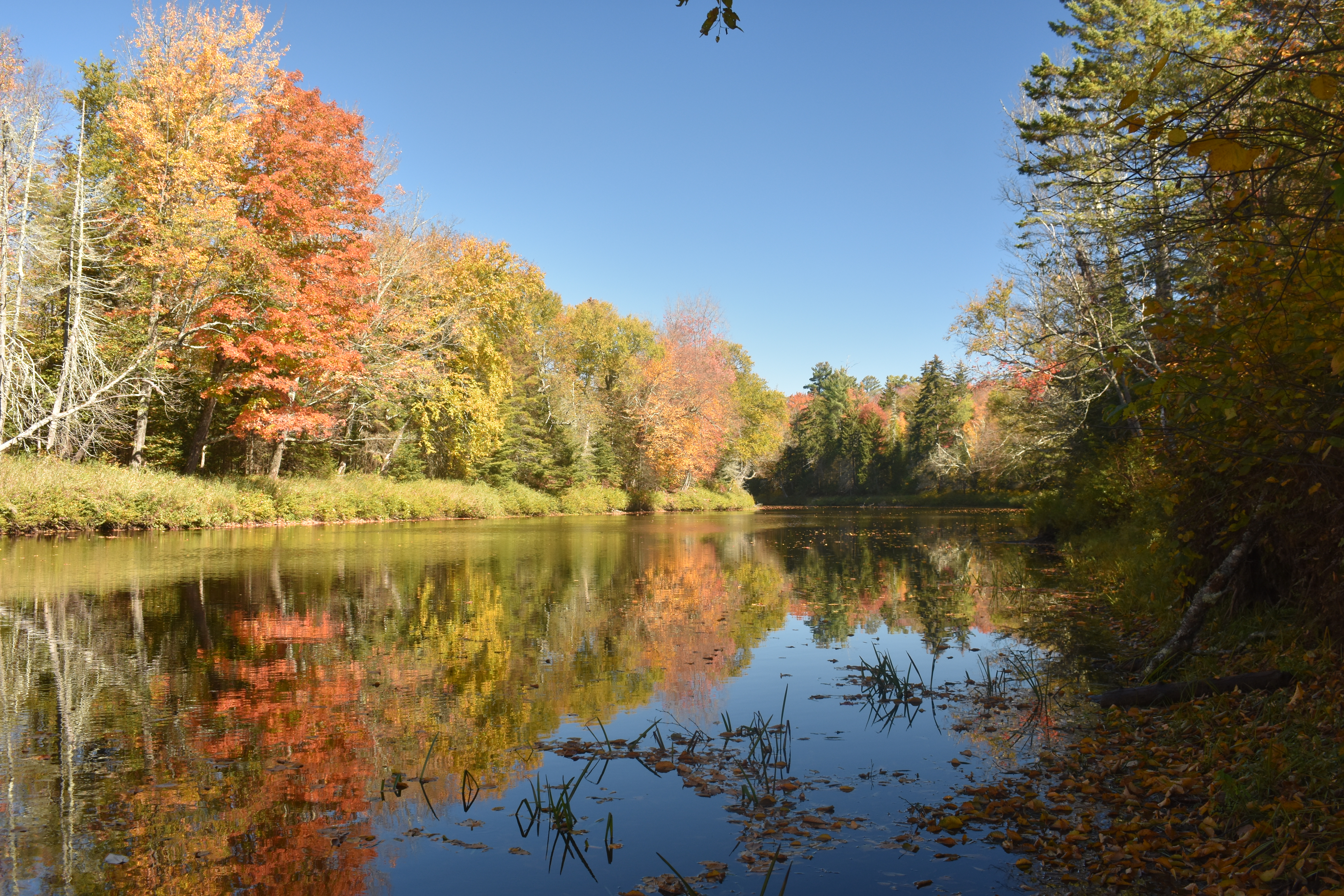
The Cedar River in October at GPS (43.796353, -74.277364)

The Cedar River is a 38.5-mile-long (62.0 km) river in the central Adirondacks, in Hamilton County, New York. It rises at the outlet of Cedar Lake in the Town of Arietta and flows northeast into the Town of Lake Pleasant, where it passes through the Cedar River Flow. Continuing northeast and east, it passes through the Town of Indian Lake and remote corners of the Towns of Minerva and Newcomb to join the Hudson River northeast of the hamlet of Indian Lake. The Northville-Placid Trail goes past the Cedar Lakes and along the Cedar River to the flow.

== Cedar River Flow ==
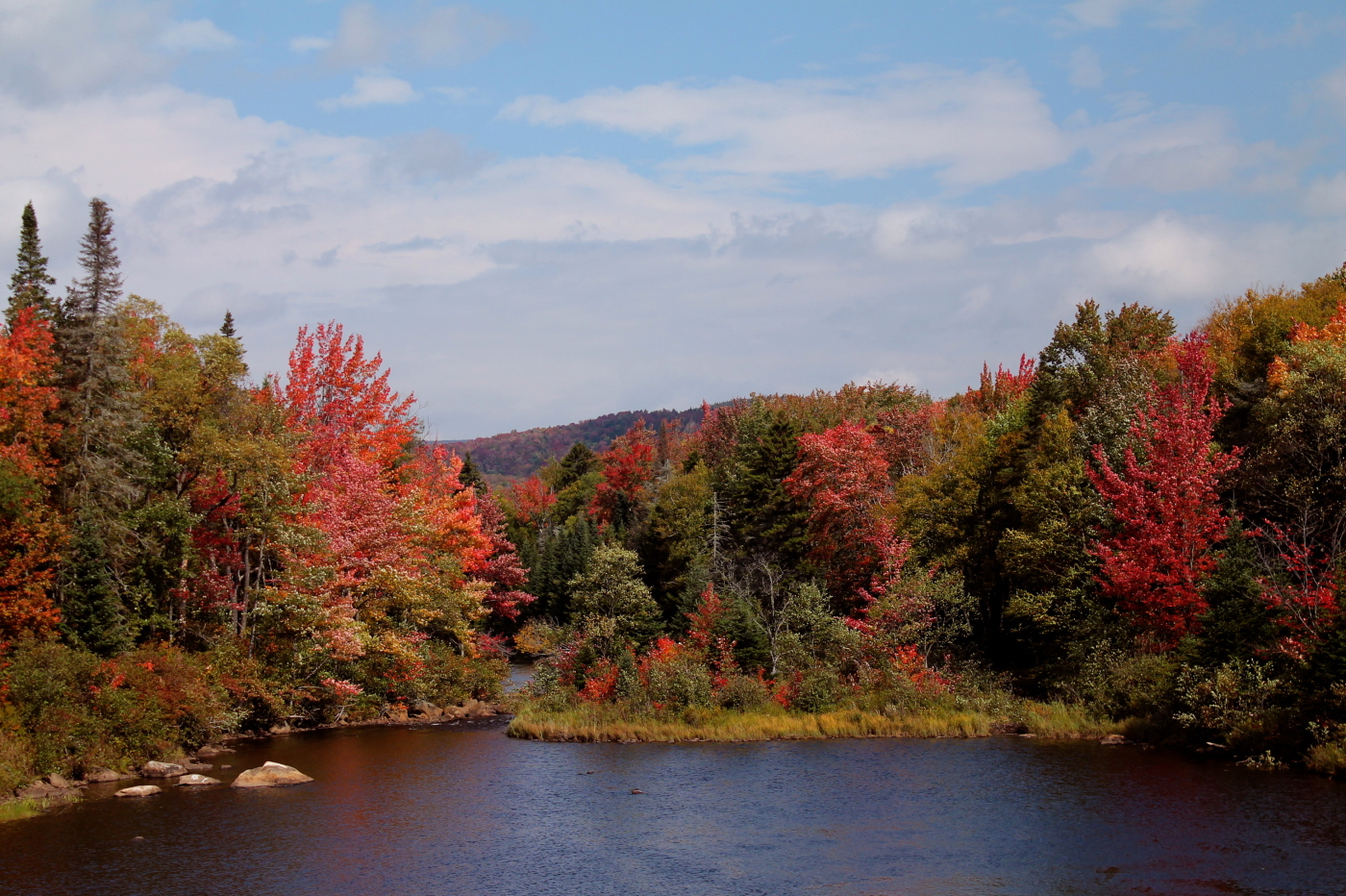
Cedar River Flow in the fall

The Cedar River Flow, located on the river, is a remote 640-acre (2.6 km^{2}) shallow lake, created by the Wakely Dam. The Flow is located 14 miles (23 km) from Indian Lake, New York.

== Islands ==
- Elm Island – Located north of Indian Lake.
