= West Canada Creek =

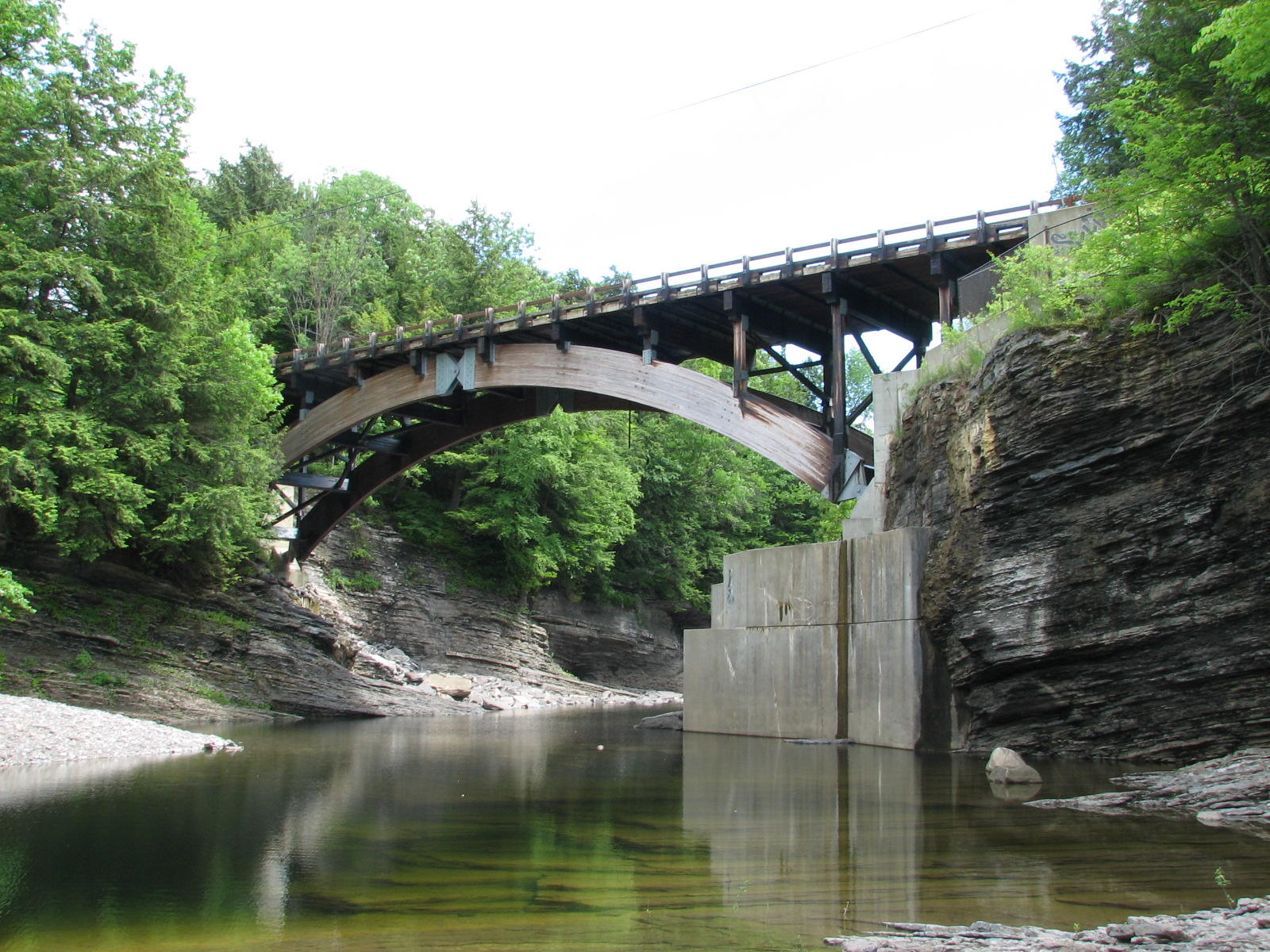
- View of West Canada Creek in Prospect Gorge

- Location of the mouth of the West Canada Creek in New York State West Canada Creek (the United States)

Location
- Country: United States
- State: New York
- Counties: Hamilton, Oneida, Herkimer

Physical characteristics
- Source: West Lake, Mud Lake, South Lake
  - location: Town of Arietta, Hamilton County
  - coordinates: 43°35′14″N 74°36′49″W
- Mouth: Mohawk River
  - location: Village of Herkimer, Herkimer County
  - coordinates: 43°01′16″N 74°57′46″W
- Length: 76 mi (122 km)
- Basin size: 565 sq mi (1,460 km^{2})
- Discharge
  - location: Kast Bridge, 4 miles (6.4 km) upstream from mouth
  - average: 1,356 cu ft/s (38.4 m^{3}/s)
  - minimum: 20 cu ft/s (0.57 m^{3}/s) (September 3, 1929)
  - maximum: 25,300 cu ft/s (720 m^{3}/s) (June 28, 2013)

Basin features
- Tributaries
  - left: South Branch West Canada Creek
  - right: Honnedaga Brook, Cincinnati Creek
- Waterfalls: Wilmurt Falls, Trenton Falls

The West Canada Creek is a 76-mile-long (122 km) river in upstate New York, United States. West Canada Creek is an important water way in Hamilton, Oneida, and Herkimer counties, draining the south part of the Adirondack Mountains before emptying into the Mohawk River near the Village of Herkimer. The name "Canada" is derived from an Iroquoian word for "village" (Kanata).

== Recreation and municipal use ==
A series of waterfalls in the Prospect Gorge, principally Trenton Falls, was a major tourist attraction in the past. Today, the West Canada is used by public utilities for power generation, and is used by the public for trout fishing, tubing, and other outdoor recreational pursuits. For fishing and fly fishing advocates, a trophy section exists from Trenton Falls to the Oneida/Herkimer county border, also known as Comstock Bridge. Efforts to balance the impacts of power generation and the habitat needs of wild trout in West Canada Creek have been undertaken by advocacy groups such as the Trout Power Initiative.

The timber, fish, and game of the area have been harvested for centuries. Today, all of the West Canada Creek is classified and protected under the New York State Wild, Scenic and Recreational Rivers System Act.

== History ==
The West Canada Creek got its name from being the western boundary of Sir William Johnson's Royal Land Grant, and because the St. Lawrence Iroquoian word for village is Kanata or Canada. The name "Canada" may also refer to the creek's importance as a trail to Canada in colonial times. The creek was also known by Native Americans as Te-ugh-ta-ra-row , meaning "its waters are discolored"; the color of the creek that resulted from its sources in the forest also gave rise to another historical name, "Amber Creek".

The stream was formerly known as the Kuyahoora River, from the Native American term Kuy-a-ho-ra, meaning "slanting waters", or "leaping waters". The river's valley is also known as the Kuyahoora Valley.

On October 30, 1781, Walter Butler was killed along West Canada Creek near Black Creek. He was attempting to delay American forces and allow Loyalist forces to escape following the Battle of Johnstown during the American Revolutionary War. According to legend his body was stripped naked and left to the wolves propped up in an old tree stump.

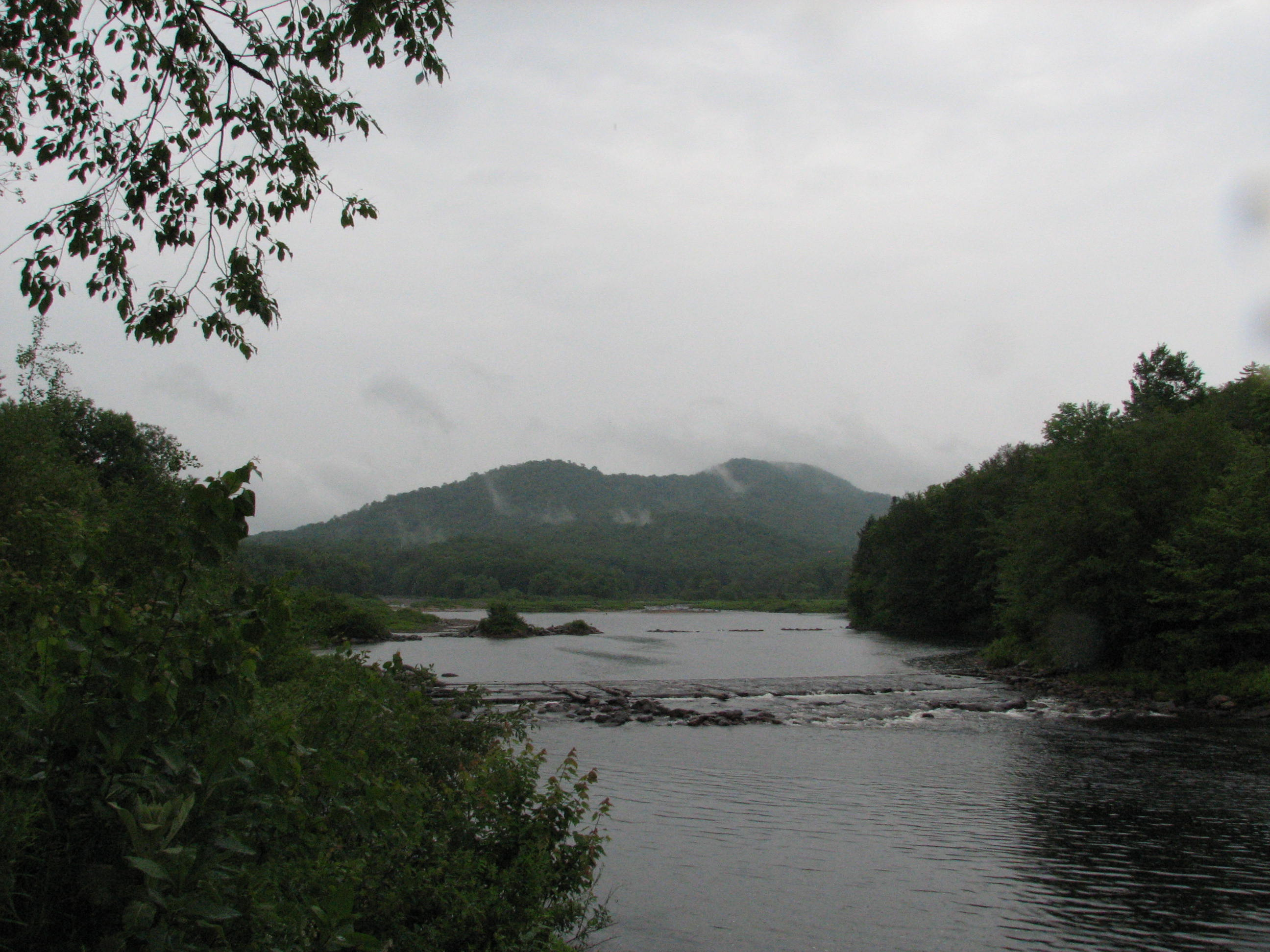
View of Ft. Noble Mountain taken at Nobleboro, including the remains of the old dam.

Following the Revolutionary War, Arthur Noble II (son of Arthur Noble) purchased 80,000 acres (320 km^{2}) in the present town of Ohio, and called it "Nobleboro". He built a saw mill there to export lumber to Ireland. In 1790 Noble got a road built to Nobleboro so that he could ride to his saw mill in a coach-and-four. Some logging occurred at Nobleboro before the Civil War, but by the late 1800s a new call for lumber and paper caused new activity in the woods of the region. Pulp and paper mills were built at Hinkley, with saw mills and a debarking mill at Nobleboro. The vast forests to the north were still in private ownership and they supplied these industries for decades. Each spring logs and pulpwood were flushed downstream on the wave of snowmelt and Nobleboro was an important staging area for these log drives. The foundation logs of the river drive dam that controlled water flow can still be seen at the river's edge. Log drives continued on the West Canada Creek until 1949. Since then the land here has healed nearly hiding the once-thriving industrial complex once known as "Nobleboro, the gateway to the great north woods".

In the late-19th century and first decade of the 20th century, the area surrounding the creek's source at the West Canada Lakes was inhabited by several woodsmen who were lumberjacks, trappers, fishermen, hunters and guides. Most notable was a character named Louis Seymore, commonly known as French Louie. In 1922 the Adirondack Mountain Club was founded with the purpose of enacting conservation work and maintaining trails. They laid out and maintained the Northville-Placid Trail which runs through the West Canada Lakes area and is now maintained by the New York State Department of Environmental Conservation (NYSDEC).

By the 1930s float planes were bringing increasing numbers of anglers to the West Canada Lakes and the trout population was decreasing rapidly. Around that time the state began an aggressive stocking program which continued into the 1960s, but the fishery was still declining. By the mid 1970s water acidity had depleted trout populations in many of the lakes and in the river itself. In 1972, the West Canada Lake Wilderness Area was designated by the NYSDEC as "Wilderness", and as such no motorized vehicles or watercraft are allowed into the area. It was determined that during summer and fall acidity was fine, but during the spring snow melt a large quantity of acidic water was entering the lakes and streams, just at the time that young trout were hatching. In the late 1980s increasing catches of brook trout and lake trout renewed interest. Subsequent studies have shown reduced acidity and increased trout populations.

In 1863, William H. Seward, then Secretary of State to Abraham Lincoln, met with representatives of foreign nations at Trenton Falls to persuade them not to recognize the Confederacy.

== Tributaries ==
=== Right ===
- Honnedaga Brook
- Seabury Brook
- Big Brook
- Mill Creek
- Mad Tom Brook
- Concklin Brook
- Cincinnati Creek
- Shed Brook
- Mill Brook

=== Left ===
- Indian River
- Metcalf Brook
- Betty Green Brook
- South Branch West Canada Creek
- Fourmile Brook
- Mill Creek
- Cold Brook
- Oklahoma Creek
- White Creek
- City Brook
- Maltanner Creek
- Stony Creek
- North Creek

== Course ==
=== The West Canada Lakes ===
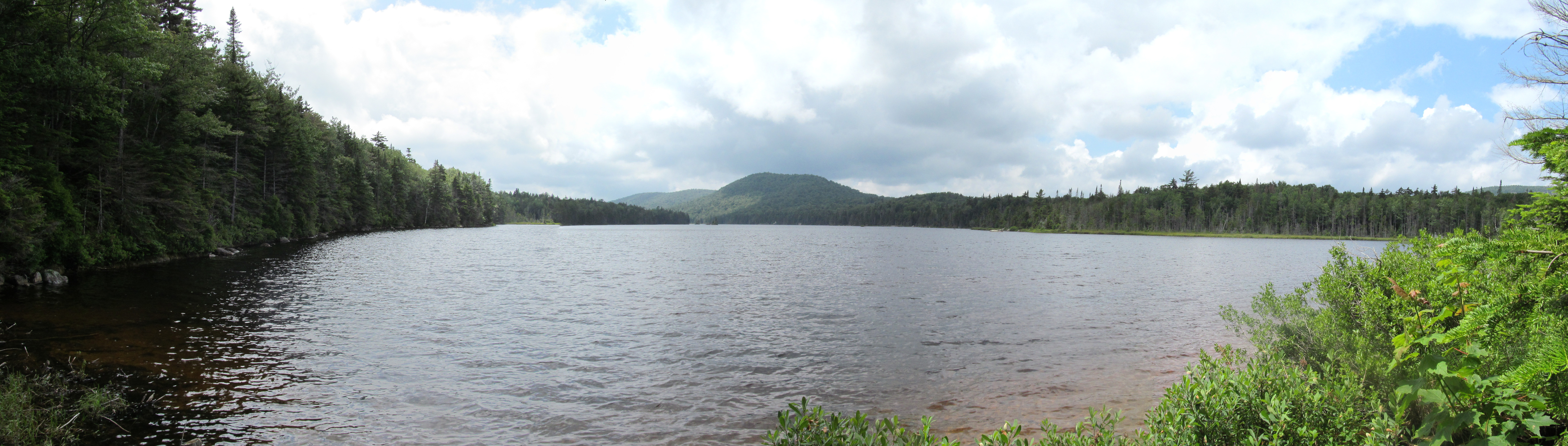
View of South Lake, one of the West Canada Lakes, taken from the Northville-Placid Trail in July 2015.

The West Canada Lakes (West Lake, Mud Lake, and South Lake) are the source of the West Canada Creek. Nearby Brook Trout Lake and Northrup Lake are the source of the Indian River which empties into the Moose River country.

=== South Branch of the West Canada Creek ===
The West Canada Creek's south branch gets its start at T-lake, northwest of Piseco Lake. It travels southwest, through the town of Morehouse, and joins the main branch of the West Canada at Nobleboro. North of Route 8 on Mountain Home Road is a man-made lake called The Floe on the maps, but to the locals it is called Mountain Home Pond.

=== Nobleboro ===
Nobleboro is located at the confluence of the north and south branches of the West Canada Creek. The watershed at Nobleboro covers some 240 square miles (620 km^{2}) of the southwestern Adirondack Park, and is rich in natural resources. The West Canada Lakes Wilderness Area has been expanded to include Fort Noble Mountain, which was the site of a fire tower that was erected in 1916 until it was deactivated and removed in 1985. A kiosk next to the stream at Nobleboro, spells it "Nobleborough", however virtually every map and book refer to it as "Nobleboro."

=== Wilmurt Falls and the Ohio Gorge ===
Wilmurt Falls, which is downstream from Nobleboro in the town of Ohio, has the distinction of being the dividing line between brook trout in the waters upstream from the falls, and brown and rainbow trout downstream. The browns and rainbows for the most part don't get above the falls. The falls is also the top end of the Ohio gorge.

=== Hinckley Reservoir ===
Hinckley Reservoir, named after a community at its western end, is a man-made lake on the West Canada Creek just upstream from the Prospect Gorge. It is held back by a dam constructed of 117,000 cubic yards (89,000 m^{3}) of concrete and 600,000 cubic yards (460,000 m^{3}) of dirt. The dam was completed in 1911 and took 500 workers four years to build at a cost of $985,000. In 1928 the reservoir's name was changed to Kuyahoora Lake after campers encouraged the State committee on Geographic Names to alter the name, however the United States Board on Geographic Names continues to list "Hinckley Reservoir" as the waterbody's official name as of 2016. The water from Hinckley Reservoir is used as drinking water for Utica, and also to regulate the water level in the Barge Canal.

=== Prospect Gorge ===
The entire Prospect Gorge in the town of Trenton is inaccessible to the public. It is privately owned by Brookfield Asset Management, who administer power generation on the creek. Access is restricted due to the dangers presented by water releases from the dam, which occur at irregular intervals and can feature swiftly rising water levels. Prior to the late 1970s, restrictions were not as strictly enforced as they are today, and the water releases in the past were more predictable. The property was previously owned by the Niagara Mohawk Power Co.

=== Herkimer ===
By the time the West Canada reaches the Mohawk River near the Village of Herkimer, it has drained 569 square miles (1,470 km^{2}) of watershed.

== Hydrology ==
The United States Geological Survey (USGS) maintains stream gauges along the West Canada. The gauge, in operation since October 1920, located 2.2 miles (3.5 km) north of Herkimer, 4 miles (6.4 km) upstream from the mouth. It had a maximum discharge of 25,300 cubic feet (720 m^{3}) per second on June 28, 2013, and a minimum discharge of 20 cubic feet (0.57 m^{3}) per second on September 3, 1929. Another station in operation since April 2001, is located 2.6 miles (4.2 km) southwest of Wilmurt and 3 miles (4.8 km) upstream from Hinckley Reservoir. This station had a maximum discharge of 25,500 cubic feet (720 m^{3}) per second on April 28, 2011, and a minimum discharge of 34 cubic feet (0.96 m^{3}) per second on September 14, 2002. There was also formerly a stream gauge by Nobleboro that took irregular measurements from 1945 to 2000.

== See also ==
- East Canada Creek
- List of rivers of New York
