= Lake Whitney (McLeod County, Minnesota) =

Lake in the state of Minnesota, United States

- Location within Minnesota
- Location: McLeod County, Minnesota
- Coordinates: 44°46′54″N 94°25′4″W
- Type: lake

Lake Whitney is a lake in McLeod County, in the U.S. state of Minnesota.

Lake Whitney bears the name of an early settler.

== See also ==
- List of lakes in Minnesota
