= Muskrat Lake (New York) =

Lake in New York State, USA

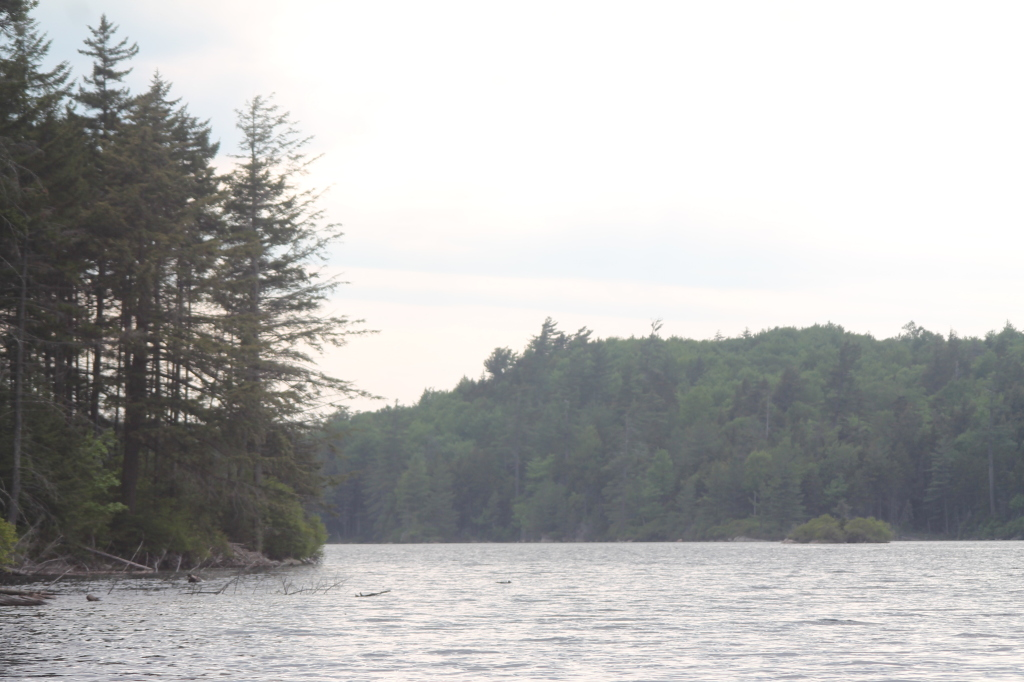
- Muskrat Lake in 2012

- Location within New York Muskrat Lake (the United States)
- Location: Hamilton County, New York, United States
- Coordinates: 43°38′00″N 74°44′21″W
- Type: Lake
- Basin countries: United States
- Surface area: 101 acres (0.41 km^{2})
- Average depth: 10 feet (3.0 m)
- Max. depth: 22 feet (6.7 m)
- Shore length^{1}: 2.5 miles (4.0 km)
- Surface elevation: 2,119 feet (646 m)
- Islands: 4
- Settlements: Inlet, New York
- ^{1} Shore length is not a well-defined measure.

Muskrat Lake (formerly Squaw Lake) is located south of Inlet, New York. Fish species present in the lake are brook trout, white sucker, and black bullhead. Access by carry down on the east shore.
