= Bisby Lakes =

Group of lakes in upstate New York

- Location of the Bisby Lakes within New York
- Location: Herkimer County, New York
- Coordinates: 43°34′45″N 74°58′40″W
- Type: Lake
- Primary outflows: Kayuta Lake
- Surface area: 2,078 acres (8.41 km^{2})
- Surface elevation: 2,018 feet (615 m)
- Settlements: Bisby Lodge

The Bisby Lakes are a collection of lakes southwest of Bisby Lodge in Herkimer County, New York. The lakes have a marshy area around them, with a few residences and piers. Boating and fishing are legal on all lakes. The lakes are a part of Black River Wild Forest. The lakes are not stocked with fish, but brook trout, lake trout, splake, white sucker, bullhead, and yellow perch are native to the lakes.

== First Lake ==
First Lake is the northernmost major lake in the Bisby Lakes, and is solely fed by rainfall. It drains southwest via an unnamed creek which flows into Second Lake. The lake is 152 acres (62 ha) in size. There are a small number of residencies and piers on all sides of the lake. Bisby Lodge, a small cabin for which the lakes are named is on the east bank of the lake. First Lake has the most settlements of all of the Bisby Lakes.

== Second Lake ==
Second Lake is the third northernmost major lake in the Bisby Lakes, fed by inflow from First Lake and Chamber Lake, which are both upstream from Second Lake. The lake is 117 acres (47 ha) in size. On the northern edge of the lake, the creek from First Lake is bridged by Bisby Road. Two islands sit in the northern half of the lake. The small inlet on the west bank of the lake is named Deer Bay.

== Third Lake ==
Third Lake is a smaller lake towards the middle of the Bisby Lakes. The lake is fed through a channel from Second Lake. Third Lake flows into Fourth Lake and Sand Lake. With a size of 43 acres (17 ha), Third Lake is the smallest major lake in the Bisby Lakes. There are a pair of small islands in the north half of the lake.

== Fourth Lake ==
Fourth Lake is the southernmost major lake in the Bisby Lakes. The lake is fed by Woodhull creek, from Third Lake and Second Lake. The lake drains into Woodhull Creek. The lake is 62 acres (25 ha) in size. There is a small inlet on the northwest bank of the Lake.

== Woodhull Lake ==
Woodhull lake is the largest and easternmost of the Bisby Lakes. With a size of 1,088 acres (440 ha), Woodhull Lake makes up over half of the surface area of the combined Bisby Lakes. The lake also contains the largest island in the Bisby Lakes, Big Island, which is on the northern arm of the lake. Brooktrout Point and Remson Point are the two peninsulas on opposite sides of the lake, in the southern half of the lake. There are a couple scattered piers on all sides of the lake.

== Sand Lake ==
Sand Lake is a smaller lake to the south of Woodhull Lake. Woodhull Lake and Third lake both flow into Sand Lake. There are a couple island of varying sizes in the north half of the lake, and an archipelago of small islands in the bottom half of the lake. The lake is 312 acres (126 ha) in size.

== Canachagala Lake ==
Canachagala Lake is the easternmost lake, and is fed by Canachagala Creek. The lake is 336 acres (136 ha) in size. The lake is completely uninhabited, unlike the more western Bisby Lakes. The lake feds into Golden Stair Creek, also unlike the other Bisby Lakes, which ultimately drain into Woodhull Creek.

== Small bodies of water ==
- Bloodsucker Pond — Small pond connected to the west arm of Woodhull Creek
- Canachagala Creek — Creek that feds into Canachagala lake from the north
- Chub Pond — Southernmost lake in the Bisby Lake, feeds into Woodhull Creek
- Combs Lake — Small lake north of Woodhull Lake, fed by Combs Brook
- Chamber Lake — Small lake east of Second Lake, feeds into Second Lake
- Golden Stair Creek — Creek east of Chamber Lake, merges with Grindstone Creek
- Grindstone Creek — Southern and easternmost Creek, fed by Canachagala lake and merges with Woodhull Creek
- Sylvan Ponds — Pair of small ponds west of First Lake, feeds into First lake
- Woodhull Creek — Creek fed by South and Fourth Lake, merges with Grindstone Creek, feeds into Kayuta Lake
