= Hinckley Reservoir =

Hinckley Lake
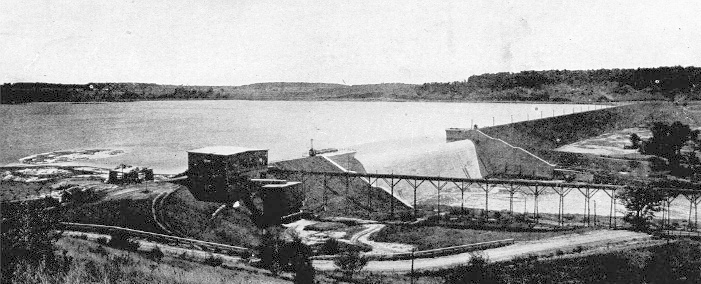
- Hinckley Dam in 1921

- Location within New York Hinckley Lake (the United States)
- Location: Herkimer County, Oneida County, New York
- Coordinates: 43°19′58″N 75°04′27″W
- Type: Reservoir
- Primary inflows: West Canada Creek; Black Creek
- Primary outflows: West Canada Creek
- Basin countries: United States
- Surface area: 2,707 acres (10.95 km^{2})
- Average depth: 28 ft (8.5 m)
- Max. depth: 75 ft (23 m)
- Water volume: 25.8 billion US gallons (0.098 km^{3})
- Surface elevation: 1,224 ft (373 m) when full
- Settlements: Hinckley, New York, Utica, New York

Hinckley Lake is located in Hinckley, New York. Originally dammed up to supply water to the Erie Canal, the lake provides municipal water supply to 130,000 people in the greater Utica, New York area, is a source of hydropower, and supports recreation during all seasons. The lake is located in the towns of Russia in Herkimer County, and Remsen in Oneida County. This body of water is one of many man-made lakes in the Upstate NY region. Its sister lake is Delta Lake, also dammed up to supply water to the Erie Canal.

Gregory B. Jarvis Plant is named in honor of Gregory Jarvis, a 41-year-old payload specialist from the Mohawk Valley who was killed aboard the Space Shuttle Challenger in 1986. This 9,000-kW facility began operation in June of that year. The plant is located about 20 miles (32 km) from Mohawk Central High School, where Jarvis graduated in 1963.

== Geography ==
The topography of its watershed of 372 square miles is rugged and varies in altitude from about 1,165 to 3,100 feet above sea-level. The drainage basin of this creek, like that of the upper Mohawk, is located in the region which has the maximum precipitation of the state, a precipitation which is exceptionally high during the winter months, in the form of snow.

No constricted gorge, where a short dam might be built, was available on the site of this reservoir. The dam has a total length of 3,700 feet, of which there is a 400-foot masonry section, embodying gate chambers and spillway. The major, or earthen, portion of the dam has a concrete core wall running through most of its length. The masonry content of the dam is 110,020 cubic yards, while there are 611,200 cubic yards of embankment in the earthen section. The masonry has a maximum height of 82 feet above rock and the overfall at the spillway is 61 feet. The maximum height of the earthen dam is 56 feet above the natural surface.

The lake forks into two parts, which have a combined length of about thirteen miles but no great width, only about a half mile. Its area is 4.46 square miles and its capacity 3,445,000,000 cubic feet. The maximum depth at crest level is 75 feet and the average depth, 28 feet. It necessitated the removal of 209 buildings, which made up parts of three villages, and it submerged seven miles of highways. This lake too is of much value for flood regulation, the maximum rate of flood discharge being very materially reduced.

== Fishing ==
The lake also offers sport fishing. Fish species that are present in the reservoir are smallmouth bass, rock bass, black bullhead, pickerel, trout, and yellow perch. There is a boat launch that requires a fee, located on the west shore off NY-365. It accommodates launching of all boat sizes. There is also a boat rental business on the lake.

== History ==
The public water supply of Utica was owned and operated by the Consolidated Water Company. The original supply was installed in 1850 and consisted of a reservoir supplied by the so-called Graftenberg springs, located in the hills south of the city. As the population increased additional reservoirs were constructed and surface streams impounded, constituting what is known as the southern supply. In about 1907 the supply from the West Canada creek was introduced into the town. In 1915 the barge canal reservoir at Hinckley was completed. It is from this reservoir that the West Canada Creek supply was taken, at least through 1918.

In February, 1917, a rather serious but localized outbreak of typhoid fever occurred in Utica, New York which upon an investigation by this Department was attributed to an infection of the water in the mains through cross connections between auxiliary fire supplies from polluted sources. The results of analyses of the raw water from the Hinckley supply have shown in the past a moderate amount of active contamination as indicated by the total bacterial counts and the presence of organisms of the E. coli type.

In 1928, the name was officially changed to Kayuhoora Lake after land owners encouraged the state committee of geographic names to alter the name but it never took as people continued to call it Hinckley Lake.

== Status in 1918 ==
The intake at the Hinckley Lake consisted of a gate house located about midway of the dam, the point of intake being about 25 feet below the water surface. From this intake the water flowed by gravity through about 10 miles of 24-inch mains to a diverting reservoir located in the town of Marcy about 6 miles north of Utica. From this lake water was diverted to 2 distributing reservoirs, one known as the Marcy reservoir, located in the town of Marcy and the other, known as the Deerfield Reservoir, located in the town of Deerfield. The Marcy reservoir was an open reservoir formed by earthen embankments paved on the inner slopes and with a capacity of 15,000,000 gallons. From this reservoir a 24-inch main led to the northwestern section of the city's distribution mains. The Deerfield reservoir was of similar construction to that of the Marcy reservoir and had a storage capacity of approximately 106,000,000 gallons. From this reservoir a 20-inch main led into the city distribution system at the foot of Genesee street.

On the New Hartford distribution system was a stand-pipe with a capacity of 150,000 gallons and on the Oriskany distribution system is a stand-pipe with 250,000 gallons capacity. Another supply has been obtained in the past from a small intake dam on Keels creek not far from the Deerfield reservoir. This however is not now used.

The water company is required to maintain a monthly patrol of the watersheds and to maintain sanitary conditions thereon in accordance with the stipulations of the rules.

== Dam construction ==
Built across the West Canada Creek near the village of Hinckley. The dam was constructed by the State of New York and completed in 1915 for the purpose of supplying water to the enlarged canal. Hinckley Reservoir was located at its present site primarily because of its proximity to the canal and its elevation above the canal.

The dam is 3,700 feet long, mainly an earthen structure with a concrete core wall. At the creek channel there are gate chambers and a spillway 400 feet long. The masonry contents of this dam are 110,020 cubic yards, while the embankment amounts to 611,200 cubic yards. The maximum height of masonry above rock is 82 feet and the overfall at the spillway, 61 feet. The area of the reservoir at crest level is 4.46 square miles, its maximum depth is 75 feet and average depth of 28 feet. The reservoir's capacity is 3,445,000,000 cubic feet.

== Water level statistics ==
- The lowest reservoir elevation in the record is 1174.9 ft observed on November 17, 1964.
- Hinckley Reservoir has reached a record low level of 1,189.0 ft above sea level on September 26, 2007.
- On March 10, 2010 with a level of 1187.7 ft
- When full to the spillway crest at an elevation of 1225 ft
- NYPA hydropower generation goes off line at an elevation of about 1195 feet;
- Drinking water withdrawal is affected at about 1185 feet;
- Canal navigation releases are affected at about 1173.5 feet; and
- Fisheries release rates are affected at about 1173.5 feet.

On May 5, 2010 the reservoir reached a new daily recorded low elevation of 1215.4', which is 9' lower than the average recorded elevation for that day. Record low elevations continued through May until mid-June. As of June 8, the reservoir was at 1215.1' which is 2.6' below recorded low levels for that day, and 8.8' below average.

== Web Cams ==
- leegreen
