= Honnedaga Lake =

Lake in New York, United States

- Location within New York Honnedaga Lake (the United States)
- Location: Herkimer County, New York, United States
- Coordinates: 43°31′29″N 74°49′03″W
- Type: Lake
- Primary outflows: Honnedaga Brook
- Basin countries: United States
- Surface area: 824 acres (3.33 km^{2})
- Average depth: 50 feet (15 m)
- Max. depth: 180 feet (55 m)
- Surface elevation: 2,188 feet (667 m)
- Settlements: Atwell, New York

Honnedaga Lake is located in the Adirondack Mountains of New York, United States. It was originally called Jocks Lake or Transparent Lake. The name was later changed to Honnedaga, a local Native American word said to mean "clear" or "calm waters". The closest village is Atwell, New York.
