= Castor Hill =

Mountain in New York, United States

- Location within New York Adirondack Park Location within the United States

Highest point
- Elevation: 1,483 feet (452 m)
- Coordinates: 43°38′58″N 75°50′34″W

Geography
- Location: E of Greenboro, Oswego County, New York, U.S.
- Topo map: USGS Worth Center

Castor Hill is a 1,483-foot-tall (452 m) mountain in the Tug Hill region of New York. It is located east of Greenboro in Oswego County. In 1927, an 80-foot-tall (24 m) steel fire lookout tower was built on the mountain. Due to use of aerial detection the tower was closed at the end of the 1970 fire lookout season, and later removed in 1981.

== History ==
In 1927, the Conservation Department built an 80-foot-tall (24 m) Aermotor LS40 steel fire lookout tower on the mountain. In the 1950s, there was a dispute between the owner of the land and the Conservation Department. The dispute wasn't able to be resolved, so in 1961 the tower was dismantled and reassembled across the road in the Little John Game Management Area. Due to the use of aerial detection the tower ceased fire lookout operations at the end of the 1970 fire lookout season and was later removed in 1981.
