= Northville–Placid Trail =

- Length: 138.6 mi (223.1 km)
- Location: Adirondack Park, New York, United States
- Trailheads: Northville, New York43°12′49″N 74°12′29″W; Lake Placid, New York 44°15′46″N 74°00′49″W
- Use: Hiking, Backpacking
- Difficulty: Easy to Moderate Grade
- Season: Any
- Sights: Adirondack Mountains, Adirondack Park
- Hazards: Severe Weather

Trail map
- Northville-Placid trail within Adirondack Park

The Northville–Lake Placid Trail, also known as the NPT, is a lightly traveled foot trail that runs 138 miles (214 km) through Adirondack Park in northern New York State. It was laid out by the Adirondack Mountain Club in 1922 and 1923 and is maintained by the New York State Department of Environmental Conservation. From 2014-2016 the southern section of the trail was re-routed to remove most of the road leading into the village of Northville. The southern terminus is Waterfront Park in Northville, NY and the northern terminus is Averyville Rd in Lake Placid.

South to north, it traverses:

- Shaker Mountain Wild Forest
- Silver Lake Wilderness Area
- Jessup River Wild Forest
- West Canada Lake Wilderness Area
- Moose River Plains Wild Forest
- Blue Ridge Wilderness Area
- Blue Mountain Wild Forest
- High Peaks Wilderness Area
