= Morehouse, New York =

- Town
- Location in Hamilton County and the state of New York
- Coordinates: 43°26′N 74°44′W
- Country: United States
- State: New York
- County: Hamilton
- Established: 1835

Government
  - Type: Town Council
  - Town Supervisor: Anthony Fernandez (R)
  - Town Council: Members' List: • Brian L. Taylor (D); • Sonya DeVuyst (R); • Bill Uebele (R); • MaryAnn Mosher (R)

Area
  - Total: 194.77 sq mi (504.45 km^{2})
  - Land: 191.06 sq mi (494.85 km^{2})
  - Water: 3.71 sq mi (9.60 km^{2})
- Elevation: 2,287 ft (697 m)

Population (2020)
  - Total: 92
  - Density: 0.49/sq mi (0.19/km^{2})
- Time zone: UTC-5 (Eastern (EST))
  - Summer (DST): UTC-4 (EDT)
- ZIP Code: 13353 (Hoffmeister)
- FIPS code: 36-041-48340
- GNIS feature ID: 0979237
- Website: morehousenewyork.com

Morehouse is a town in Hamilton County, New York, United States. The population was 92 at the 2020 census. The name is that of an early developer, Andrew K. Morehouse.

The town is in the Adirondack Park. It is in the southwestern corner of the county and is northeast of Utica.

== History ==
Morehouse was formed from part of the town of Lake Pleasant in 1835. Morehouse ("Morehouseville") was created by land developer and entrepreneur Andrew King Morehouse (1805-1884); the post office there opened on April 9, 1834. (Morehouse owned 60,000 acres (240 km^{2}) of wilderness in Hamilton, Herkimer and Saratoga counties, but ultimately ended up dying in a poorhouse.) Part of the town was later taken and added to the town of Long Lake. An additional part of Morehouse was taken for Long Lake in 1861. In 1901, the town of Inlet was formed from the northern end of Morehouse.

One of the most newsworthy events to occur in town was the crash landing of an American Airways Curtis Condor in December 1934 and daring rescue of the crew by locals on snowshoes in the southern end of town.

== Geography ==
According to the United States Census Bureau, the town has a total area of 194.7 square miles (504 km^{2}), of which 191.1 square miles (495 km^{2}) is land and 3.6 square miles (9.3 km^{2}) (1.86%) is water.

The western and southern town lines of Morehouse are the border of Herkimer County.

The West Canada Creek flows out the western town line, and other tributaries of that stream flow through the town. The Moose River marks the northern town line.

New York State Route 8, an east–west highway in the southern part of the town, is the only significant road in Morehouse, passing through the hamlets of Morehouseville and Hoffmeister.

== Demographics ==
Historical population
Census	Pop.	Note	%±
1840	169		—
1850	242		43.2%
1860	228		−5.8%
1870	186		−18.4%
1880	181		−2.7%
1890	182		0.6%
1900	319		75.3%
1910	149		−53.3%
1920	109		−26.8%
1930	85		−22.0%
1940	91		7.1%
1950	104		14.3%
1960	65		−37.5%
1970	113		73.8%
1980	102		−9.7%
1990	106		3.9%
2000	151		42.5%
2010	86		−43.0%
2020	92		7.0%

As of the census of 2020, there were 92 people and 21 households residing in the town. The population density was 0.48 inhabitants per square mile (0.19/km^{2}). There were 280 housing units at an average density of 1.5 per square mile (0.58/km^{2}). The racial makeup of the town was 95.65% White, 0.00% Native American, 4.35% from two or more races. Hispanic or Latino of any race were 0.00% of the population. The median age was 59.5 years.

The median income for a household in the town was $58,125.

== Communities and locations in Morehouse ==
=== Communities ===
- Hoffmeister – A hamlet on NY-8 east of Morehouse, named after an early settler. This community is little more than a thin scattering of houses.
- Morehouseville – A hamlet, also called "Morehouse" and previously known as "Bethunville," is on NY-8, east of the county line. This is the principal community in the town.
- Mountain Home – A location north of Hoffmeister, on Mountain Home Road.

=== Geographical features ===
- Beaver Lake – A lake by the northern town line.
- Bochen Lake – A lake located south of Morehouseville.
- The Floe – An artificial lake between Mountain Home and Hoffmeister, on the South Branch of West Canada Creek.
- Fort Noble Mountain – An elevation at the western town line, northwest of Morehouseville (Altitude: 2,310 feet/700 meters).
- Indian Lake – A Lake in the northern part of Morehouse, south of Squaw Lake.
- Jerseyfield Lake – A lake at the southern town line.
- Metcalf Lake – A lake located northeast of Hoffmeister.
- Moose River – A river marking the northern town line.
- Morehouse Lake – A small lake south of Morehouse Mountain.
- Morehouse Mountain – A mountain near the eastern town line, south of NY-8.
- Pine Lake – A lake by the eastern town line, northeast of Hoffmeister.
- Squaw Lake – A lake in the northern part of the town, south of Beaver Lake.
- South Branch West Canada Creek – A small river flowing west, to the north of NY-8.
- West Creek Lake – A lake located east of Jerseyfield Lake.
- Wilmurt Lake – A lake north of NY-8.
