= Nobleboro, New York =

- Hamlet
- Location within New York Location within the United States
- Coordinates: 43°23′45″N 74°51′43″W
- Country: United States
- State: New York
- County: Herkimer
- Town: Ohio
- Elevation: 1,430 ft (436 m)
- Time zone: UTC-5 (Eastern (EST))
  - Summer (DST): UTC-4 (EDT)
- ZIP code: 13324
- Area code: 315

Nobleboro, formally known as Noblesboro, is a hamlet located in the town of Ohio in Herkimer County, New York, United States. The South Branch West Canada Creek converges with the West Canada Creek in the hamlet.

The name "Noblesboro", now Nobleboro, is derived from its situation at the boundary of a royal grant to Sir William Johnson. The remains of a pulpwood boom and rossing mill on West Canada Creek, are located in Nobleboro and is commemorated today with a scenic overlook and kiosk.
