= Wells (CDP), New York =

Wells, New York
- Census-designated place
- Location within New York Location within the United States
- Coordinates: 43°23′41″N 74°17′23″W
- Country: United States
- State: New York
- County: Hamilton
- Town: Wells

Area
  - Total: 8.34 sq mi (21.61 km^{2})
  - Land: 7.72 sq mi (20.00 km^{2})
  - Water: 0.63 sq mi (1.62 km^{2})
- Elevation: 1,003 ft (305.8 m)

Population (2020)
  - Total: 531
  - Density: 68.8/sq mi (26.55/km^{2})
- Time zone: UTC-5 (Eastern (EST))
  - Summer (DST): UTC-4 (EDT)
- ZIP code: 12190
- Area code: 518
- FIPS code: 36-79048
- GNIS feature ID: 2628190

Wells is a census-designated place (CDP) in the town of Wells, Hamilton County, New York, United States. It is within the Adirondack Park.

== Geography ==
The community is in the southern part of the town of Wells, in southeastern Hamilton County, surrounding Lake Algonquin on the Sacandaga River. The CDP extends south as far as the West Branch of the Sacandaga. New York State Route 30 passes through the center of the community, leading north 13 miles (21 km) to Speculator and south 15 miles (24 km) to Northville.

== Demographics ==
Historical population
Census	Pop.	Note	%±
2020	531		—
U.S. Decennial Census
