= Forks Mountain (Wells, New York) =

Mountain in New York, United States

- Location within New York Adirondack Park Location within the United States

Highest point
- Elevation: 1,535 feet (468 m)
- Coordinates: 43°27′35″N 74°14′01″W

Geography
- Location: NE of Wells, New York, U.S.
- Topo map: USGS Griffin

Forks Mountain is a summit located in Adirondack Mountains of New York located in the Town of Wells northeast of the hamlet of Wells. It is named Forks Mountain due to it being inside the Fork where the East Branch Sacandaga River meets the Sacandaga River.
