= Little Cathead Mountain =

Mountain in New York, United States

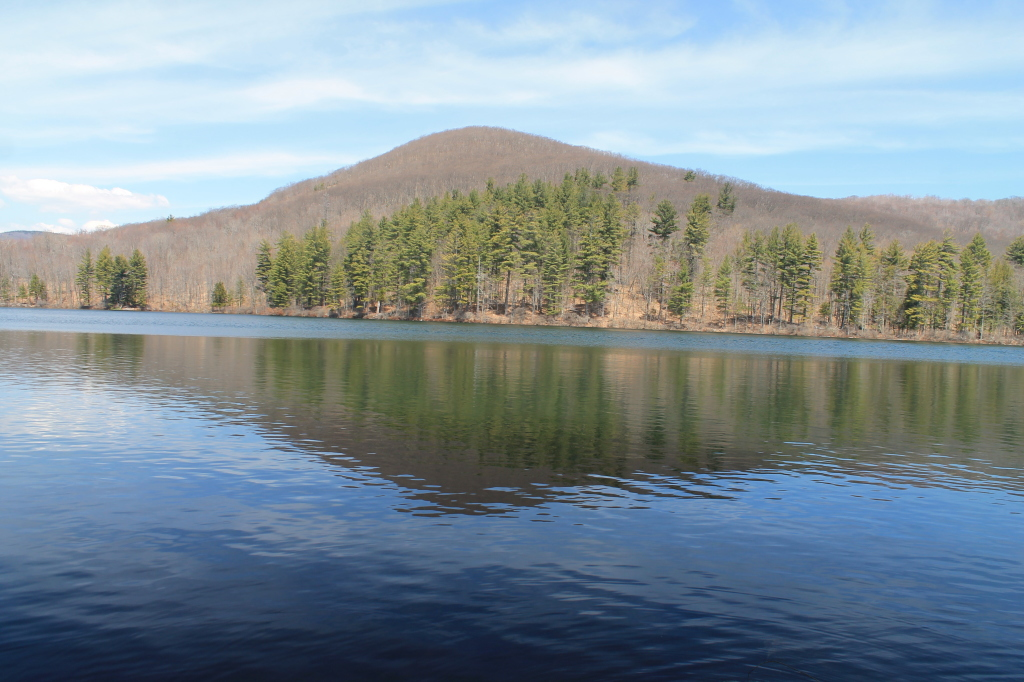
- Little Cathead Mountain from Woods Lake

Highest point
- Elevation: 2,093 feet (638 m)
- Coordinates: 43°15′42″N 74°18′30″W

Geography
- Location within New York Adirondack Park Location within the United States
- Location: NE of Upper Benson, New York, U.S.
- Topo map: USGS Cathead Mountain

Little Cathead Mountain is a summit located in the Adirondack Mountains of New York located in the Town of Benson northeast of the hamlet of Upper Benson.
