= Dunning Creek (Sacandaga River tributary) =

Location
- Country: United States
- State: New York

Physical characteristics
- Mouth: Sacandaga River
  - location: Wells, New York
  - coordinates: 43°26′17″N 74°15′29″W
  - elevation: 1,096 ft (334 m)

Dunning Brook flows into the Sacandaga River north of Wells, New York. The creek drains Charley Lake, Gilman Lake, and Dunning Pond.
