= Petes Creek =

Location
- Country: United States
- State: New York

Physical characteristics
- Mouth: Sacandaga River
  - location: Hope, New York
  - coordinates: 43°19′03″N 74°15′46″W
  - elevation: 807 ft (246 m)

Petes Creek flows into the Sacandaga River near Hope, New York.
