= Hamilton Mountain (disambiguation) =

Hamilton Mountain refers to the Niagara Escarpment in the city of Hamilton, Ontario, Canada.

Hamilton Mountain may also refer to:

- Hamilton Mountain (federal electoral district), a federal electoral district in the Hamilton area
- Hamilton Mountain (provincial electoral district), a provincial electoral district in the Hamilton area
- Hamilton Mountain A's, an ice hockey team in Hamilton, Ontario
- Hamilton Mountain (Hamilton County, New York), a summit in New York
