= Groff Creek =

River in New York, United States

Groff Creek Falls
- Location within New York
- Nearest city: Hope, NY
- Coordinates: 43.3123337°N 74.2559280°W
- Length: Approx. 1.8 miles (2.9 km)
- Location: Hope, NY
- Designation: National Scenic Trail
- Trailheads: New York
- Use: Hiking, Snowshoeing
- Highest point: 1,375 ft (419 m)
- Lowest point: 925 ft (282 m)
- Difficulty: Moderate to hard
- Season: Year round
- Hazards: Severe weather Tick-borne diseases Mosquitos; Steep grades

Groff Creek is a minor tributary of the Sacandaga River, and a hiking trail located in the Adirondack State Park in Hope, New York. The trail is an old logging road to camps along Devorse creek, containing three waterfalls and densely packed eastern hemlock trees and red spruce.

== Hiking trail ==
The trail is located in Hope, New York, 5 and a half miles South of Wells, NY. It is a 1.8 mile trail, including 3 waterfalls each ranging between 10 and 30 feet tall. The trail was originally a major logging road that ran to Devorse creek, but the road was abandoned and later the first 2 miles of it began seeing use as a hiking trail. Part of the old road runs along a steep gorge, where loggers had to build a flying trestle to allow horses to pull logs from nearby camps. Groff mountain has a large population of eastern hemlock and red spruce. Historically, these attracted tanners from nearby towns. Because of the dense forestation, the area is largely shaded, and so often maintains snow throughout the winter. The trail sees use from hikers during the spring and summer, and snowshoers in winter. There is a small parking area for the trail at the end of River road.

The trailhead begins at 43.3123337N, 74.2559280W. It passes over Pete's creek by bridge, and runs beside Silver lake. It contains a few camp sites and old foundations along the path.

== Creek ==
Groff creek is a minor tributary of the Sacandaga River, which runs into the Hudson River, then to the Atlantic Ocean from New York City. The drainage area for Groff Creek is 13.4 square miles.
