= Kunjamuk River =

Location
- Country: United States
- State: New York
- County: Hamilton

Physical characteristics
- Mouth: Sacandaga River
  - location: Speculator, New York
  - coordinates: 43°30′12″N 74°20′20″W
  - elevation: 1,713 ft (522 m)

The Kunjamuk River flows into the Sacandaga River in Speculator, New York.
