= Hope (hamlet), New York =

Hope, New York
- Hamlet
- Location within the state of New York Location within the US
- Coordinates: 43°18′13″N 74°14′35″W
- Country: United States
- State: New York
- County: Hamilton
- Town: Hope
- Elevation: 810 ft (250 m)
- Time zone: UTC-5 (Eastern (EST))
  - Summer (DST): UTC-4 (EDT)
- Area code: 518

Hope, previously known as Hope Center, is a hamlet located in the Town of Hope in Hamilton County, New York, United States. The hamlet stretches for approximately one mile along New York State Route 30 on the eastern bank of the Sacandaga River.
