= Jersey Hill =

Mountain in New York, USA

- Location within New York Adirondack Park Location within the United States

Highest point
- Elevation: 2,251 feet (686 m)
- Coordinates: 42°21′08″N 77°52′30″W, 42°21′07″N 77°52′25″W

Geography
- Location: NE of Allegany County, New York, U.S.
- Topo map(s): USGS West Almond, Alfred

Jersey Hill is a 2,251-foot-high (686 m) mountain in the Southern Tier of New York. It is located Wells northeast of the hamlet of Allegany County. In 1935, a 79-foot-6-inch-long (24.23 m) steel fire lookout tower was built on the mountain. The Jersey Hill tower was only staffed on an as-needed basis by the Division of Lands and Forests. Due to increased use of aerial fire detection, the tower ceased fire lookout operations and was removed in August 1987.

== History ==
The Civilian Conservation Corps (CCC) built footers for a steel fire lookout tower in 1934. The next year, the CCC built a 79-foot-6-inch-long (24.23 m) International Derrick tower on the mountain. This tower like many in the Southern Tier was added to protect large holdings of state forest lands, and not to be part of the close knit system of towers in the Adirondacks and Catskills. Also the CCC built many miles of truck trails and fire breaks and many water holes in the surrounding area, to help extinguish fires that occur. The Jersey Hill tower was only staffed on an as-needed basis by the Division of Lands and Forests. Due to increased use of aerial fire detection, the tower ceased fire lookout operations and was removed in August 1987.
