= Sugarloaf Mountain (Benson, New York) =

Mountain in New York, United States

- Location within New York Adirondack Park Location within the United States

Highest point
- Elevation: 2,867 feet (874 m)
- Coordinates: 43°18′12″N 74°24′17″W

Geography
- Location: NNW of Upper Benson, New York, U.S.
- Topo map: USGS Whitehouse

Sugarloaf Mountain is a summit located in the Adirondack Mountains of New York located in the Town of Benson north-northwest of the hamlet of Upper Benson.
