= Coulombe Creek =

River in the United States of America

Location
- Country: United States
- State: New York

Physical characteristics
- Mouth: Sacandaga River
  - location: Hope, New York
  - coordinates: 43°21′06″N 74°15′48″W
  - elevation: 895 ft (273 m)

Coulombe Creek flows into the Sacandaga River near Hope, New York.
