= Cathead Mountain =

Mountain in New York, United States

- Location within New York Adirondack Park Location within the United States

Highest point
- Elevation: 2,428 feet (740 m)
- Coordinates: 43°17′00″N 74°17′19″W

Geography
- Location: N of Benson, Hamilton County, New York, U.S.
- Topo map: USGS Cathead Mountain

Cathead Mountain is a 2,428-foot-tall (740 m) mountain located in the Adirondack Mountains of New York. It is located north of the hamlet of Benson in Hamilton County. In 1910, a wood fire lookout tower was built on the mountain. In 1916, it was replaced with a 50-foot-tall (15 m) steel tower. The tower ceased fire lookout operations at the end of the 1988 season and was officially closed in early 1989. Later on, a tower frame was built and attached to the current tower to provide space for radio antennas.

== History ==
In June 1910, the Forest, Fish and Game Commission built an 18-foot-tall (5.5 m) wood tower on the mountain. At that time 2.75 miles (4.43 km) of telephone line was laid to the summit so that the observer could report fires quicker. In 1916, the Conservation Commission replaced the wood tower with a 50-foot-tall (15 m) Aermotor LL25 tower. The tower was built lighter than the 1917 design and had no stairs but only a ladder up the exterior to get to climb the tower. Wood steps were added within the structure in 1918 or 1919, for easier access. In 1929, Aermotor developed a self-supporting staircase to install in the towers purchased in 1916. This staircase was purchased and installed in this tower in 1929. The tower ceased fire lookout operations at the end of the 1988 season and was officially closed in early 1989. In order to comply with Adirondack Park Agency policies, which prohibit the placement of any additional towers within the park, a tower frame was built and attached to the current tower to provide space for radio antennas.
