= Third Popple =

Mountain in New York, United States

- Location within New York Adirondack Park Location within the United States

Highest point
- Elevation: 1,519 feet (463 m)
- Coordinates: 43°20′43″N 74°18′46″W

Geography
- Location: NNE of Upper Benson, New York, U.S.
- Topo map: USGS Cathead Mountain

Third Popple is a summit located in the Adirondack Mountains of New York located in the Town of Benson north-northeast of the hamlet of Upper Benson.
