= Sand Hills (Nevada) =

Mountain range in Nevada, United States

- Location within Nevada

Highest point
- Elevation: 1,855 m (6,086 ft)

Geography
- Country: United States
- State: Nevada
- District: Washoe County
- Range coordinates: 39°51′4.666″N 119°53′36.707″W
- Topo map: USGS Granite Peak

The Sand Hills are a mountain range in Washoe County, Nevada. The highest peak is Granite Peak; bounded on the west by Petersen mountain, the Porcupine Mountains and Lees Flat, on the south by Freds Mountain and on the east by Bedell Flat.
