= Willis Lake (New York) =

- Location within New York Willis Lake (the United States)
- Location: Hamilton County, New York, United States
- Coordinates: 43°22′08″N 74°14′29″W
- Type: Lake
- Basin countries: United States
- Surface area: 36 acres (0.15 km^{2})
- Average depth: 5 feet (1.5 m)
- Max. depth: 9 feet (2.7 m)
- Shore length^{1}: 1.6 miles (2.6 km)
- Surface elevation: 1,312 feet (400 m)
- Islands: 1
- Settlements: Pumpkin Hollow, New York
- ^{1} Shore length is not a well-defined measure.

Willis Lake is located northeast of Pumpkin Hollow, New York. Fish species present in the lake are pumpkinseed sunfish, largemouth bass, yellow perch, and brown bullhead. There is access by trail from Pumpkin Hollow Road.
