= Three Ponds Mountain =

Mountain in New York, United States

- Location within New York Adirondack Park Location within the United States

Highest point
- Elevation: 2,920 feet (890 m)
- Coordinates: 43°18′00″N 74°22′17″W, 43°18′00″N 74°22′41″W

Geography
- Location: NW of Upper Benson, New York, U.S.
- Topo map: USGS Cathead Mountain

Three Ponds Mountain is a summit located in the Adirondack Mountains of New York located in the Town of Benson northwest of the hamlet of Upper Benson.
