= Little Roundtop Mountain =

Mountain in New York, United States

- Location within New York Adirondack Park Location within the United States

Highest point
- Elevation: 1,952 feet (595 m)
- Coordinates: 43°19′59″N 74°20′12″W

Geography
- Location: N of Upper Benson, New York, U.S.
- Topo map: USGS Cathead Mountain

Little Roundtop Mountain is a summit located in the Adirondack Mountains of New York located in the Town of Benson north-northwest of the hamlet of Upper Benson.
