= Lake Algonquin (New York) =

- Location within New York Lake Algonquin (the United States)
- Location: Hamilton County, New York, United States
- Coordinates: 43°23′46″N 74°17′35″W
- Type: Lake
- Primary inflows: Sacandaga River
- Primary outflows: Sacandaga River
- Basin countries: United States
- Surface area: 259 acres (1.05 km^{2})
- Max. depth: 19 feet (5.8 m)
- Shore length^{1}: 6.1 miles (9.8 km)
- Surface elevation: 988 feet (301 m)
- Settlements: Wells, New York
- ^{1} Shore length is not a well-defined measure.

Lake Algonquin is located west of Wells, New York. Fish species present in the lake are sunfish, yellow perch, and walleye. There is a boat launch of Algonquin Road on the west shore. There is also a carry down off Craig Road on the northeast shore.
