= Doig Creek =

Location
- Country: United States
- State: New York

Physical characteristics
- Mouth: Sacandaga River
  - location: Hope, New York
  - coordinates: 43°19′04″N 74°15′34″W
  - elevation: 826 ft (252 m)

Doig Creek flows into the Sacandaga River in Hope, New York.
