= Murphy Lake (New York) =

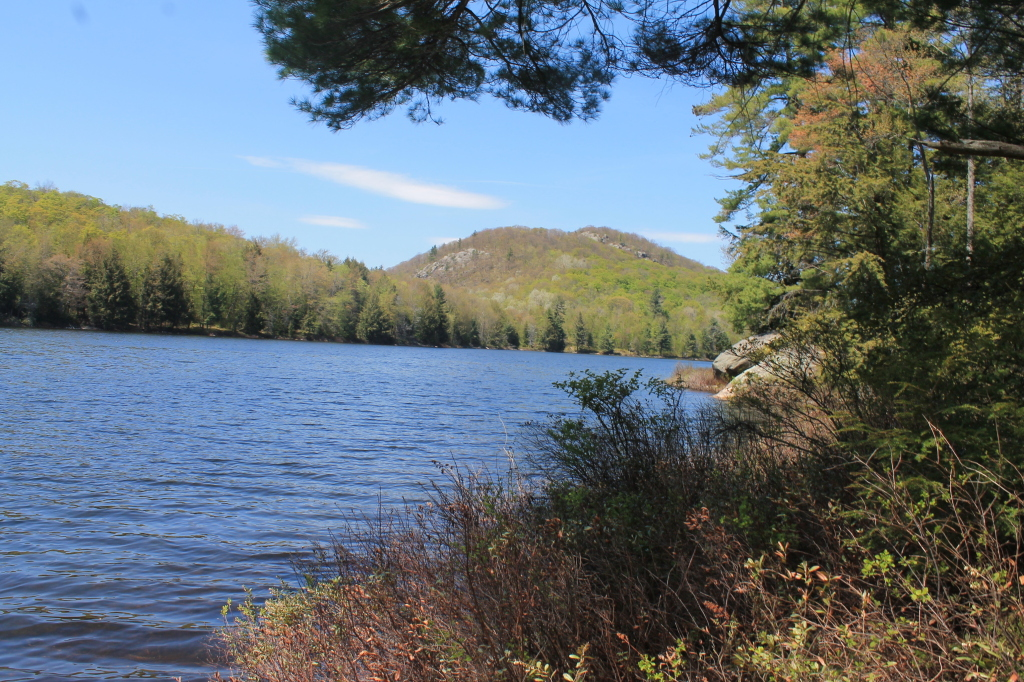
- Murphy Lake with Huckleberry Mountain in background

- Location within New York Murphy Lake (the United States)
- Location: Hamilton County, New York
- Coordinates: 43°20′22″N 74°13′05″W
- Type: Lake
- Basin countries: United States
- Surface area: 38 acres (15 ha)
- Surface elevation: 1,473 ft (449 m)

Murphy Lake is a 38-acre (15 ha) lake in Hamilton County, New York, United States. Murphy Lake lies at an elevation of 1,473 feet (449 m) in the Wilcox Lake Wild Forest of the Adirondack Park.

In 2008, the lake, in the town of Hope was stocked with brook trout to sustain its natural population.
