= Benson, New York =

- Town
- Location in Hamilton County and the state of New York.
- Coordinates: 43°15′7″N 74°16′41″W
- Country: United States
- State: New York
- County: Hamilton

Government
  - Type: Town Council
  - Town Supervisor: John M. Stortecky
  - Town Council: Members' List: • Douglas Gregor; • Douglas Chamberlain; • John Sheppard III; • John M. Stortecky

Area
  - Total: 83.20 sq mi (215.48 km^{2})
  - Land: 82.62 sq mi (213.98 km^{2})
  - Water: 0.58 sq mi (1.50 km^{2})
- Elevation: 2,313 ft (705 m)

Population (2020)
  - Total: 221
  - Density: 2.7/sq mi (1.03/km^{2})
- Time zone: UTC-5 (Eastern (EST))
  - Summer (DST): UTC-4 (EDT)
- ZIP Code: 12134 (Northville)
- FIPS code: 3604105958
- GNIS feature ID: 0978723
- Website: Town of Benson

Benson is a town in Hamilton County, New York, United States. The population was 221 at the 2020 census. The town is on the southern border of Hamilton County and is northwest of Schenectady.

== History ==
Benson was formed in 1860 from the towns of Hope and Mayfield (now in Fulton County). Benson once possessed an iron mine.

== Geography ==
According to the United States Census Bureau, the town of Benson has a total area of 83.2 square miles (215.5 km^{2}), of which 82.6 square miles (214.0 km^{2}) are land and 0.58 square miles (1.5 km^{2}), or 0.70%, are water.

The Sacandaga River runs along part of the southeastern border of the town. The southern town line is the border of Fulton County.

New York State Route 30 passes through the southeastern corner of Benson.

== Demographics ==
Historical population
Census	Pop.	Note	%±
1860	380		—
1870	320		−15.8%
1880	402		25.6%
1890	322		−19.9%
1900	299		−7.1%
1910	143		−52.2%
1920	119		−16.8%
1930	69		−42.0%
1940	89		29.0%
1950	85		−4.5%
1960	87		2.4%
1970	89		2.3%
1980	156		75.3%
1990	168		7.7%
2000	201		19.6%
2010	192		−4.5%
2020	221		15.1%
U.S. Decennial Census

As of the census of 2000, there were 201 people, 80 households, and 58 families residing in the town. The population density was 2.4 inhabitants per square mile (0.93/km^{2}). There were 160 housing units at an average density of 1.9 per square mile (0.73/km^{2}). The racial makeup of the town was 99.00% White, and 1.00% from two or more races. Hispanic or Latino of any race were 1.49% of the population.

There were 80 households, out of which 28.8% had children under the age of 18 living with them, 56.3% were married couples living together, 7.5% had a female householder with no husband present, and 27.5% were non-families. 20.0% of all households were made up of individuals, and 8.8% had someone living alone who was 65 years of age or older. The average household size was 2.51 and the average family size was 2.81.

In the town, the population was spread out, with 18.4% under the age of 18, 13.9% from 18 to 24, 20.9% from 25 to 44, 30.3% from 45 to 64, and 16.4% who were 65 years of age or older. The median age was 44 years. For every 100 females, there were 103.0 males. For every 100 females age 18 and over, there were 105.0 males.

The median income for a household in the town was $48,250, and the median income for a family was $50,000. Males had a median income of $39,375 versus $23,750 for females. The per capita income for the town was $20,992. None of the families and 2.4% of the population were living below the poverty line, including no under eighteens and 6.8% of those over 64.

== Communities and locations in Benson ==
- Benson – The hamlet of Benson, located on Benson Road at the junction of North Road near the southern town line.
- Big Popple – An elevation located north-northeast of Upper Benson.
- Blue Ridge Mountain – An elevation located northwest of Upper Benson.
- Cathead Mountain – An elevation located north of Benson.
- Devorse Creek – A tributary of the Sacandaga River, flowing northward out of Benson.
- Four Staves – An elevation located north-northwest of Upper Benson.
- Jacksons Seat – An elevation located northeast of Upper Benson.
- King Vly Mountain – An elevation located north-northeast of Upper Benson.
- Little Cathead Mountain – An elevation located west of Benson.
- Little Popple – An elevation located north-northeast of Upper Benson.
- Little Roundtop Mountain – An elevation located north of Upper Benson.
- Moose Mountain – An elevation located northwest of Upper Benson.
- Rock Lake Mountain – An elevation located west-northwest of the hamlet of Benson.
- Silver Lake – A lake near the western town line.
- Silver Lake Mountain – An elevation located north-northwest of Upper Benson.
- Sugarloaf Mountain – An elevation located north-northwest of Upper Benson.
- Third Popple – An elevation located north-northeast of Upper Benson.
- Three Ponds Mountain – An elevation located northwest of Upper Benson.
- Upper Benson – A small hamlet at the western end of Benson Road at Washburn Road, and near the southern town line.
- Vly Mountain – An elevation located north-northwest of Upper Benson.
- Wallace Mountain – An elevation located north of Upper Benson.
- White Lake Mountain – An elevation located west-northwest of the hamlet of Wells.
- Woods Lake – A small lake northeast of Upper Benson.
