= Blue Ridge Mountain (New York) =

Mountain in New York, United States

- Location within New York Adirondack Park Location within the United States

Highest point
- Elevation: 2,841 feet (866 m)
- Coordinates: 43°16′33″N 74°24′14″W

Geography
- Location: NW of Upper Benson, New York, U.S.
- Topo map: USGS Whitehouse

Blue Ridge Mountain is a summit located in the Adirondack Mountains of New York located in the Town of Benson northwest of the hamlet of Upper Benson.
