= White Lake Mountain =

Mountain in New York, United States

- Location within New York Adirondack Park Location within the United States

Highest point
- Elevation: 2,287 feet (697 m)
- Coordinates: 43°16′08″N 74°27′05″W

Geography
- Location: WNW of Upper Benson, New York, U.S.
- Topo map: USGS Whitehouse

White Lake Mountain is a summit located in the Adirondack Mountains of New York located in the Town of Benson west-northwest of the hamlet of Upper Benson.
