= Cross Mountain =

Cross Mountain may refer to:

- Cross Mountain (California), near Little Dixie, California
- Cross Mountain (Colorado), a mountain peak of Colorado
- Cross Mountain (Montana), a mountain in Lincoln County, Montana
- Cross Mountain (Delaware County, New York)
- Cross Mountain (Hamilton County, New York)
- Cross Mountain (Ulster County, New York)
- Cross Mountain (Pennsylvania)
- Cross Mountain (Tennessee), site of the Cross Mountain Mine disaster
- Cross Mountain, Texas
