= Huckleberry Mountain =

Mountain in New York, United States

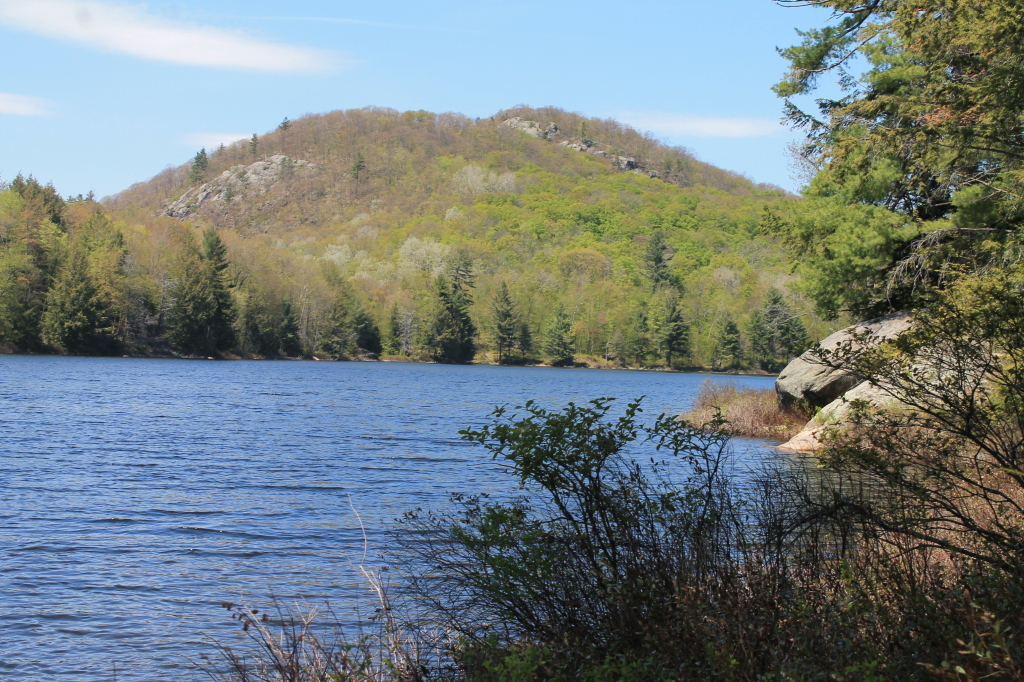
- Huckleberry Mountain from Murphy Lake

Highest point
- Elevation: 1,926 feet (587 m)
- Coordinates: 43°20′47″N 74°13′15″W

Geography
- Location within New York Adirondack Park Location within the United States
- Location: NNW of Hope Falls, New York, U.S.
- Topo map: USGS Hope Falls

Huckleberry Mountain is a summit located in Adirondack Mountains of New York located in the Town of Hope north-northwest of the hamlet of Hope Falls.
