= Four Staves =

Mountain in New York, United States

- Location within New York Adirondack Park Location within the United States

Highest point
- Elevation: 2,283 feet (696 m)
- Coordinates: 43°19′45″N 74°21′59″W, 43°19′00″N 74°22′41″W

Geography
- Location: NNW of Upper Benson, New York, U.S.
- Topo map: USGS Cathead Mountain

Four Staves is a summit located in the Adirondack Mountains of New York located in the Town of Benson north-northwest of the hamlet of Upper Benson.
