= Rock Lake Mountain =

Summit in the Adirondack Mountains in New York

- Location within New York Adirondack Park Location within the United States

Highest point
- Elevation: 2,290 feet (700 m)
- Coordinates: 43°15′38″N 74°24′56″W

Geography
- Location: WNW of Upper Benson, New York, U.S.
- Topo map: USGS Whitehouse

Rock Lake Mountain is a summit located in the Adirondack Mountains of New York located in the Town of Benson west-northwest of the hamlet of Upper Benson.
