= Gilman Lake (New York) =

- Location within New York Gilman Lake (the United States)
- Location: Hamilton County, New York, United States
- Coordinates: 43°27′50″N 74°18′55″W
- Type: Lake
- Basin countries: United States
- Surface area: 45 acres (0.18 km^{2})
- Max. depth: 55 feet (17 m)
- Shore length^{1}: 2 miles (3.2 km)
- Surface elevation: 1,670 feet (510 m)
- Settlements: Gilmantown, New York
- ^{1} Shore length is not a well-defined measure.

Gilman Lake is located north of Gilmantown, New York. Fish species present in the lake are sunfish and rainbow trout. There is a carry down off CR-16 on the east shore.
