= Dugway Mountain =

Mountain in New York, United States

- Location within New York Adirondack Park Location within the United States

Highest point
- Elevation: 2,966 feet (904 m)
- Coordinates: 43°22′49″N 74°23′00″W

Geography
- Location: W of Wells, New York, U.S.
- Topo map: USGS Lake Pleasant

Dugway Mountain is a summit located in Adirondack Mountains of New York, located in the Town of Wells, west of the hamlet of Wells.
