= Robbs Creek =

Location
- Country: United States
- State: New York

Physical characteristics
- Mouth: Sacandaga River
  - location: Speculator, New York
  - coordinates: 43°30′32″N 74°17′12″W
  - elevation: 1,514 ft (461 m)

Robbs Creek flows into the Sacandaga River near Speculator, New York.
