= Cattle Mountain =

Mountain in New York, United States

- Location within New York Adirondack Park Location within the United States

Highest point
- Elevation: 2,093 feet (638 m)
- Coordinates: 43°23′03″N 74°12′17″W

Geography
- Location: E of Wells, New York, U.S.
- Topo map: USGS Griffin

Cattle Mountain is a summit located in Adirondack Mountains of New York located in the Town of Wells east of the hamlet of Wells.
