= Upper Pine Mountain =

Mountain in New York, United States

- Location within New York Adirondack Park Location within the United States

Highest point
- Elevation: 2,395 feet (730 m)
- Coordinates: 43°35′14″N 74°18′04″W

Geography
- Location: N of Wells, New York, U.S.
- Topo map: USGS Kunjamuk River

Upper Pine Mountain is a summit located in Adirondack Mountains of New York located in the Town of Wells north of the hamlet of Wells.

Its highest elevation is 2395 feet (730 m).
