= County Line Mountain =

Mountain in New York, United States

- Location within New York Adirondack Park Location within the United States

Highest point
- Elevation: 3,081 feet (939 m)
- Coordinates: 43°36′41″N 74°12′03″W

Geography
- Location: NE of Wells, New York, U.S.
- Topo map: USGS South Pond Mountain

County Line Mountain is a summit located in Adirondack Mountains of New York located in the Town of Wells northeast of the hamlet of Wells.
