= Mount Overrocker =

Mountain in New York, United States

- Location within New York Adirondack Park Location within the United States

Highest point
- Elevation: 2,113 feet (644 m)
- Coordinates: 43°24′50″N 74°18′28″W

Geography
- Location: NNW of Wells, New York, U.S.
- Topo map: USGS Wells

Mount Overrocker, also known as Mount Rouge, is a mountain range located in Adirondack Mountains of New York located in the Town of Wells north-northwest of the hamlet of Wells.
