= Humphrey Mountain =

Mountain in New York, United States

- Location within New York Adirondack Park Location within the United States

Highest point
- Elevation: 2,976 feet (907 m)
- Coordinates: 43°38′05″N 74°14′16″W, 43°38′15″N 74°15′06″W

Geography
- Location: N of Wells, New York, U.S.
- Topo map: USGS Bullhead Mountain

Humphrey Mountain is a summit located in Adirondack Mountains of New York located in the Town of Wells north of the hamlet of Wells.
