= Big Range =

Mountain in New York, United States

- Location within New York Adirondack Park Location within the United States

Highest point
- Elevation: 3,366 feet (1,026 m)
- Coordinates: 43°34′58″N 74°15′16″W, 43°35′17″N 74°14′36″W

Geography
- Location: N of Wells, New York, U.S.
- Topo map: USGS Kunjamuk River

Big Range is a mountain range located in Adirondack Mountains of New York located in the Town of Wells north of the hamlet of Wells.
