= Petes Hill =

Mountain in New York, United States

- Location within New York Adirondack Park Location within the United States

Highest point
- Elevation: 2,126 feet (648 m)
- Coordinates: 43°37′40″N 74°16′45″W

Geography
- Location: N of Wells, New York, U.S.
- Topo map: USGS Indian Lake

Petes Hill is a summit located in Adirondack Mountains of New York located in the Town of Wells north of the hamlet of Wells.
