= Fly Creek (Sacandaga River tributary) =

Location
- Country: United States
- State: New York

Physical characteristics
- Mouth: Sacandaga River
  - location: Speculator, New York
  - coordinates: 43°30′41″N 74°17′26″W
  - elevation: 1,553 ft (473 m)

Fly Creek flows into the Sacandaga River near Speculator, New York.
