= Hope Falls, New York =

- Hamlet
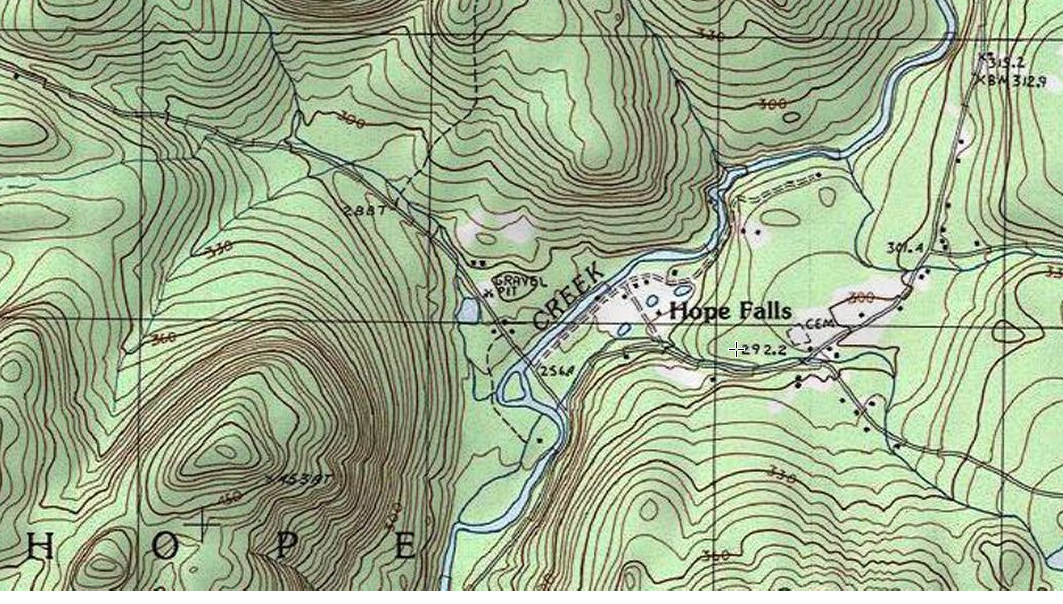
- Situation of Hope Falls

- Location within New York Location within the United States
- Coordinates: 43°18′00″N 74°11′19″W
- Country: United States
- State: New York
- County: Hamilton
- Town: Hope
- Elevation: 846 ft (258 m)
- Time zone: UTC-5 (Eastern (EST))
  - Summer (DST): UTC-4 (EDT)
- Area code: 518

Hope Falls is a hamlet located in the Town of Hope in Hamilton County, New York, United States. Hope Falls is situated in the narrow valley of the East Stony Creek, approximately three miles above its mouth into the Great Sacandaga Lake.
