= Hamilton Mountain (Hamilton County, New York) =

Mountain in New York, United States

- Location within New York Adirondack Park Location within the United States

Highest point
- Elevation: 3,215 feet (980 m)
- Coordinates: 43°24′43″N 74°22′03″W

Geography
- Location: WNW of Wells, Hamilton County, New York, U.S.
- Topo map: USGS Wells

Hamilton Mountain is a 3,215-foot-tall (980 m) summit located in Adirondack Mountains of New York. It is located in the west-northwest of the hamlet of Wells in Hamilton County. In 1909, a wood fire lookout tower was built on the mountain. In 1916, the wood tower was replaced with a 50-foot-tall (15 m) steel tower. Due to aerial fire detection being better, the tower was closed at the end of the 1971 fire lookout season, and removed a few years later.

== History ==
In October 1909, the Forest, Fish and Game Commission built an 18-foot-tall (5.5 m) wood tower on the mountain. In 1916, the wood tower was replaced with a 50-foot-tall (15 m) Aermotor LL25 tower. The tower was of a lighter weight than the 1917 design and had no stairs but only a ladder up the exterior to get to the top. In 1918, wood steps were added to ease access to the top of the tower. In 1929, the Aermotor company developed a self-supporting staircase for installation in the towers purchased in 1916. This staircase was a tower within a tower and was anchored to the original tower. This self-supporting staircase was installed in 1931 to replace the wooden stairs that were previously installed. Due to aerial fire detection being better, the tower was closed at the end of the 1971 fire lookout season. The tower was removed around 1977, due to it having no use for fire watching purposes as well as it being a "non-conforming" structure in the Silver Lake Wilderness Area.
