= West Stony Creek =

Location
- Country: United States
- State: New York

Physical characteristics
- Mouth: Sacandaga River
  - location: Northville, New York
  - coordinates: 43°15′10″N 74°13′28″W
  - elevation: 772 ft (235 m)
- Basin size: 88 sq mi (230 km^{2})

The West Stony Creek flows into the Sacandaga River north of Northville, New York.
