= Horseshoe Mountain (New York) =

Mountain in New York, United States

- Location within New York Adirondack Park Location within the United States

Highest point
- Elevation: 2,759 feet (841 m)
- Coordinates: 43°37′00″N 74°13′03″W, 43°37′41″N 74°12′39″W

Geography
- Location: NE of Wells, New York, U.S.
- Topo map: USGS South Pond Mountain

Horseshoe Mountain is a summit located in Adirondack Mountains of New York located in the Town of Wells northeast of the hamlet of Wells.
