= Daly Creek =

Location
- Country: United States
- State: New York

Physical characteristics
- Mouth: Sacandaga River
  - location: Overlook, New York
  - coordinates: 43°16′58″N 73°57′45″W
  - elevation: 771 ft (235 m)

Daly Creek flows into the Sacandaga River near Overlook, New York.
