= Long Lake Sagamore Seaplane Base =

- IATA: none; ICAO: none; FAA LID: K03

Summary
- Airport type: Public use
- Owner: Lucci Realty Corp.
- Serves: Long Lake, New York
- Elevation AMSL: 1,629 ft / 497 m
- Coordinates: 43°58′08″N 074°25′44″W

Map
- Location of airport in New York

Runways
Direction	Length		Surface
Direction	ft	m	Surface
ALL/WAY	15,000	4,572	Water

Statistics (2011)
- Aircraft operations: 60
- Based aircraft: 1
- Sources: FAA and NYSDOT

Long Lake Sagamore Seaplane Base (FAA LID: K03) is a privately owned, public use seaplane base on Long Lake in the Town of Long Lake, Hamilton County, New York, United States.

== Facilities and aircraft ==
Long Lake Sagamore Seaplane Base resides at elevation of 1,629 feet (497 m) above mean sea level. It has one seaplane landing area designated ALL/WAY with a water surface measuring 15,000 by 2,000 feet (4,572 x 610 m).

For the 12-month period ending September 15, 2011, the airport had 60 general aviation aircraft operations. At that time there were one single-engine aircraft based at this airport.

== See also ==
- List of airports in New York
- Long Lake Helms Seaplane Base (FAA: NY9) located at 43°58′30″N 074°25′14″W
