= Lizard Pond (New York) =

- Location within New York Location within the United States
- Location: Warren County, New York, United States
- Coordinates: 43°30′41″N 74°02′35″W
- Type: Lake
- Primary outflows: East Stony Creek, Madison Creek
- Basin countries: United States
- Surface area: 29 acres (0.12 km^{2})
- Max. depth: 13 feet (4.0 m)
- Shore length^{1}: 1.6 miles (2.6 km)
- Surface elevation: 1,736 feet (529 m)
- Islands: 1
- Settlements: Garnet Lake, New York
- ^{1} Shore length is not a well-defined measure.

Lizard Pond is located in the Adirondack Mountains southwest of Garnet Lake, New York. Fish species present in the lake are brook trout, and black bullhead. There is carry down trail access off Garnet Lake on the southeast shore.
