= Devorse Mountain =

Mountain in New York, United States

- Location within New York Adirondack Park Location within the United States

Highest point
- Elevation: 1,804 feet (550 m)
- Coordinates: 43°21′07″N 74°18′52″W

Geography
- Location: SSW of Wells, New York, U.S.
- Topo map: USGS Cathead Mountain

Devorse Mountain is a summit located in Adirondack Mountains of New York located in the Town of Wells south-southwest of the hamlet of Wells.
