= Salmon Lake Mountain =

Mountain in New York, United States

- Location within New York Adirondack Park Location within the United States

Highest point
- Elevation: 2,500 feet (760 m)
- Coordinates: 43°57′47″N 74°38′46″W

Geography
- Location: W of Long Lake, Hamilton County, New York, U.S.
- Topo map: USGS Brandreth Lake

Salmon Lake Mountain is a 2,500-foot-tall (760 m) summit located in Adirondack Mountains of New York. It is located west of the hamlet of Long Lake in Hamilton County. Around 1933, a 35-foot-tall (11 m) Aermotor LX24 tower was built on the mountain. The tower was privately owned, but cooperated with the Conservation Commission for fire watching operations. The tower still remains, but is in poor condition and is not open to the public.

== History ==
Around 1933, Whitney Park built a 35-foot-tall (11 m) Aermotor LX24 tower on the mountain. The tower was privately owned, but cooperated with the Conservation Commission. The tower had no stairs but only a ladder on the exterior to access the tower.The tower is one of only a few remaining Aermotor LX24 towers still standing in the United States. The tower still remains, but is in poor condition and is not open to the public.
