= Burnham Mountain =

Mountain in New York, United States

- Location within New York Adirondack Park Location within the United States

Highest point
- Elevation: 2,257 feet (688 m)
- Coordinates: 43°30′20″N 74°18′05″W

Geography
- Location: N of Wells, New York, U.S.
- Topo map: USGS Kunjamuk River

Burnham Mountain is a summit located in Adirondack Mountains of New York located in the Town of Wells north of the hamlet of Wells.
