= Shanty Brook =

Location
- Country: United States
- State: New York

Physical characteristics
- Mouth: Sacandaga River
  - location: Speculator, New York
  - coordinates: 43°28′27″N 74°15′28″W
  - elevation: 1,352 ft (412 m)

The Shanty Brook flows into the Sacandaga River east of Speculator, New York.
