= Steve Bigle Mountain =

Mountain in New York, United States

- Location within New York Adirondack Park Location within the United States

Highest point
- Elevation: 2,126 feet (648 m)
- Coordinates: 43°25′38″N 74°11′18″W

Geography
- Location: ENE of Wells, New York, U.S.
- Topo map: USGS Griffin

Steve Bigle Mountain is a summit located in Adirondack Mountains of New York located in the Town of Wells east-northeast of the hamlet of Wells.
