= Corrigan Hill =

Mountain in New York, United States

- Location within New York Adirondack Park Location within the United States

Highest point
- Elevation: 1,709 feet (521 m)
- Coordinates: 43°23′25″N 74°13′13″W, 43°22′27″N 74°14′02″W

Geography
- Location: E of Wells, New York, U.S.
- Topo map: USGS Griffin

Corrigan Hill is a summit located in Adirondack Mountains of New York located in the Town of Wells east of the hamlet of Wells.
