= Mossy Mountain =

Mountain in New York, United States

- Location within New York Adirondack Park Location within the United States

Highest point
- Elevation: 2,313 feet (705 m)
- Coordinates: 43°33′22″N 74°17′56″W

Geography
- Location: N of Wells, New York, U.S.
- Topo map: USGS Kunjamuk River

Mossy Mountain is a summit located in Adirondack Mountains of New York located in the Town of Wells north of the hamlet of Wells.
