= Mount Orrey =

Mountain in New York, United States

- Location within New York Adirondack Park Location within the United States

Highest point
- Elevation: 2,618 feet (798 m)
- Coordinates: 43°24′15″N 74°19′28″W

Geography
- Location: W of Wells, New York, U.S.
- Topo map: USGS Wells

Mount Orrey is a mountain range located in Adirondack Mountains of New York located in the Town of Wells west of the hamlet of Wells.
