= Sand Creek (Sacandaga River tributary) =

Location
- Country: United States
- State: New York

Physical characteristics
- Mouth: Sacandaga River
  - location: West Day, New York
  - coordinates: 43°16′15″N 74°03′39″W
  - elevation: 790 ft (240 m)

Sand Creek flows into the Sacandaga River in West Day, New York.
