= Round Mountain (Hamilton County, New York) =

Mountain in New York, United States

- Location within New York Adirondack Park Location within the United States

Highest point
- Elevation: 2,408 feet (734 m)
- Coordinates: 43°25′06″N 74°19′33″W

Geography
- Location: NW of Wells, New York, U.S.
- Topo map: USGS Wells

Round Mountain is a mountain range located in Adirondack Mountains of New York located in the Town of Wells northwest of the hamlet of Wells.
