= Finch Mountain =

Mountain in New York, United States

- Location within New York Adirondack Park Location within the United States

Highest point
- Elevation: 1,995 feet (608 m)
- Coordinates: 43°21′36″N 74°20′58″W

Geography
- Location: SW of Wells, New York, U.S.
- Topo map: USGS Cathead Mountain

Finch Mountain is a summit located in Adirondack Mountains of New York located in the Town of Wells southwest of the hamlet of Wells.
