= Woods Lake =

Lake in New York

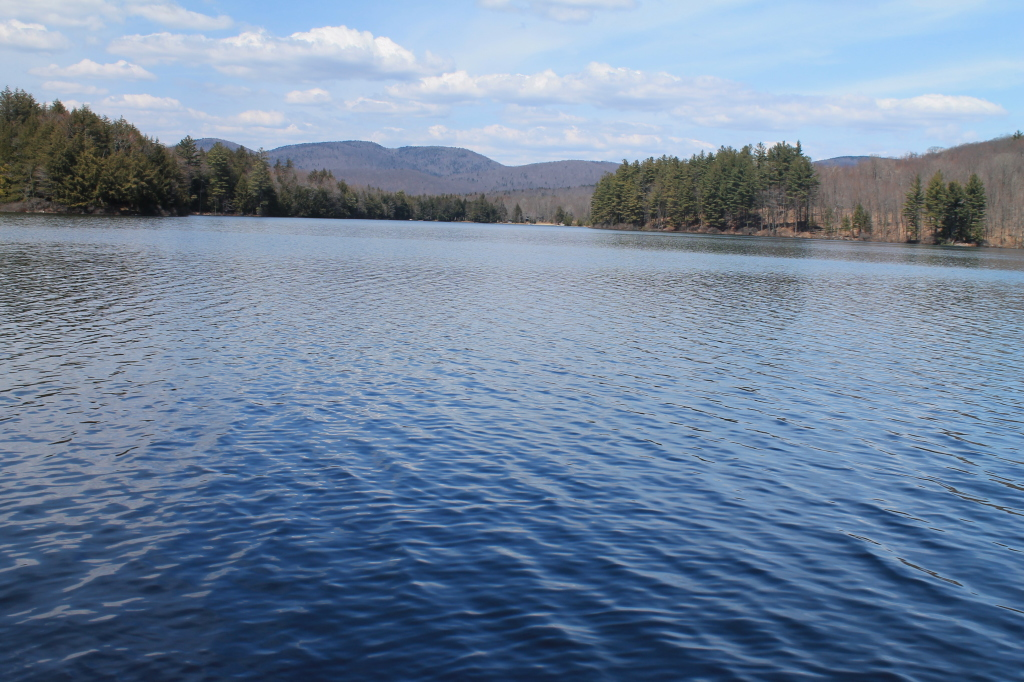
- Woods Lake in 2013

- Location within New York Woods Lake (the United States)
- Location: Hamilton County, New York, United States
- Coordinates: 43°15′15″N 74°18′52″W
- Type: Lake
- Basin countries: United States
- Surface area: 71 acres (0.29 km^{2})
- Average depth: 12 feet (3.7 m)
- Max. depth: 41 feet (12 m)
- Shore length^{1}: 2.1 miles (3.4 km)
- Surface elevation: 1,368 feet (417 m)
- Settlements: Upper Benson, New York
- ^{1} Shore length is not a well-defined measure.

Woods Lake is located east of Upper Benson, New York. Fish species present in the lake are pickerel, smallmouth bass, largemouth base yellow perch, pumpkinseed sunfish, and brown bullhead. There is access by trail from Benson Road on the west shore. No motors are allowed on this lake.
