= Cross Mountain (Hamilton County, New York) =

Mountain in New York, United States

- Location within New York Adirondack Park Location within the United States

Highest point
- Elevation: 2,723 feet (830 m)
- Coordinates: 43°34′35″N 74°17′05″W

Geography
- Location: N of Wells, New York, U.S.
- Topo map: USGS Kunjamuk River

Cross Mountain is a summit located in Adirondack Mountains of New York located in the Town of Wells north of the hamlet of Wells.
