= Debar Mountain =

Mountain in New York, United States

- Location within New York Adirondack Park Location within the United States

Highest point
- Elevation: 3,317 feet (1,011 m)
- Coordinates: 44°36′12″N 74°13′14″W

Geography
- Location: NNE of Paul Smiths, Franklin County, New York, U.S.
- Topo map: USGS Debar Mountain

Debar Mountain is a 3,317-foot-tall (1,011 m) mountain located in Adirondack Mountains of New York. It is located north-northeast of the hamlet of Paul Smiths in Franklin County. The mountain was the site of a 35-foot-tall (11 m) steel lookout tower, which was removed in 1979.

== History ==
In 1912, the Conservation Department built a wood fire lookout tower on the mountain. In 1918, the Conservation Commission replaced it with a 35-foot-tall (11 m) Aermotor LS40 tower. Due to increased aerial detection, the tower ceased fire lookout operations at the end of the 1970 season and was later removed in 1979.
