= Long Lake Helms Seaplane Base =

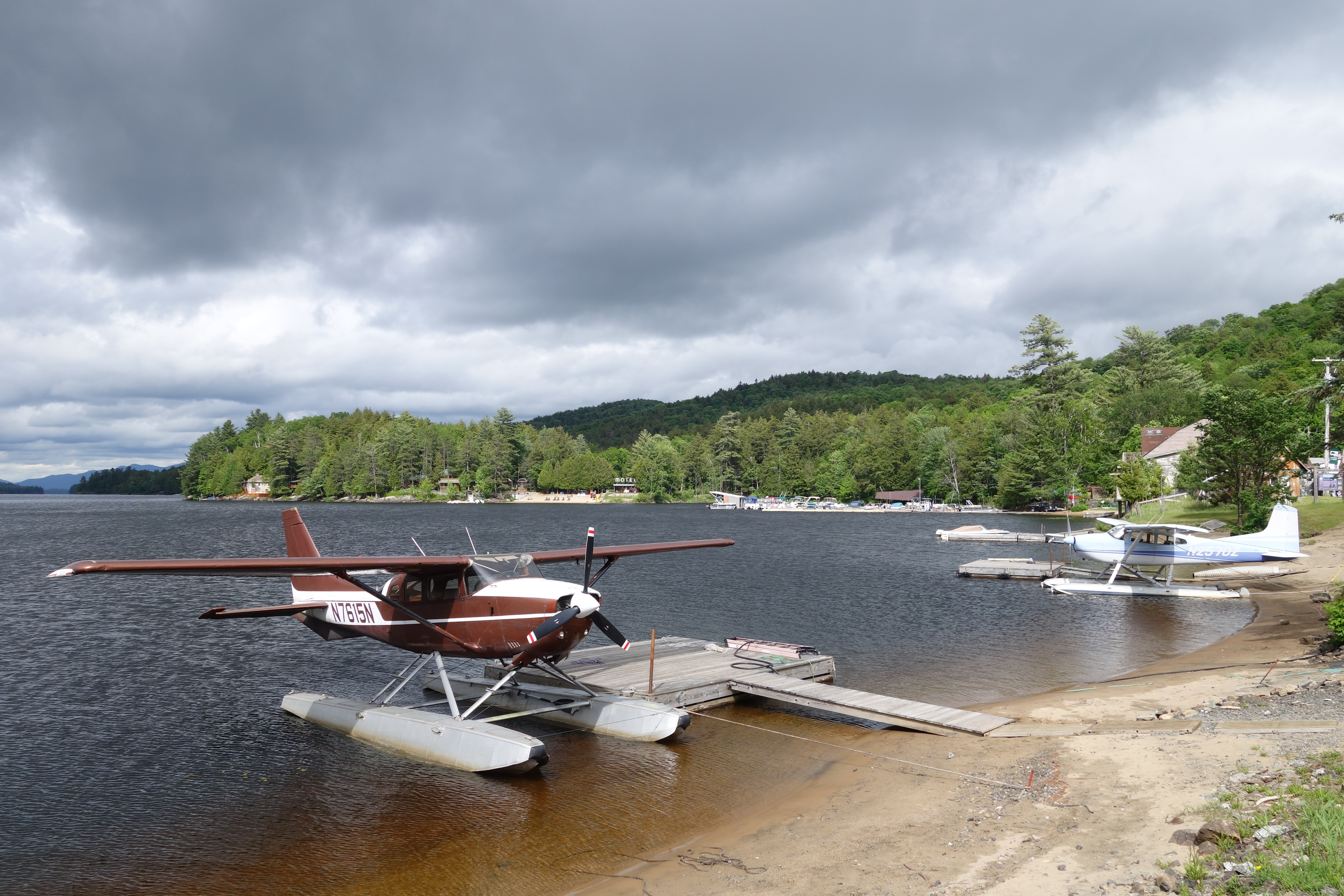
- IATA: none; ICAO: none; FAA LID: NY9

Summary
- Airport type: Public use
- Owner: Helms Aero Service Inc.
- Serves: Long Lake, New York
- Elevation AMSL: 1,629 ft (497 m)
- Coordinates: 43°58′30″N 074°25′14″W

Map
- Location of airport in New York

Runways
Direction	Length		Surface
Direction	ft	m	Surface
NE/SW	15,000	4,572	Water

Statistics (2011)
- Aircraft operations: 2,200
- Based aircraft: 3
- Sources: FAA and NYSDOT

Long Lake Helms Seaplane Base (FAA LID: NY9) is a privately owned, public use seaplane based on Long Lake in the Town of Long Lake, Hamilton County, New York, United States.

== Facilities and aircraft ==
Long Lake Helms Seaplane Base resides at elevation of 1,629 feet (497 m) above mean sea level. It has one seaplane landing area designated NE/SW with a water surface measuring 15,000 by 1,500 feet (4,572 x 457 m).

For the 12-month period ending September 15, 2011, the airport had 2,200 aircraft operations, an average of 183 per month: 54.5% general aviation and 45.5% air taxi. At that time there were three single-engine aircraft based at this airport.

== See also ==
- List of airports in New York
- Long Lake Sagamore Seaplane Base (FAA: K03) located at 43°58′08″N 074°25′44″W
