= East Branch Sacandaga River =

Location
- Country: United States
- State: New York

Physical characteristics
- Mouth: Sacandaga River
  - location: Wells, New York
  - coordinates: 43°26′46″N 74°15′04″W
  - elevation: 1,045 ft (319 m)

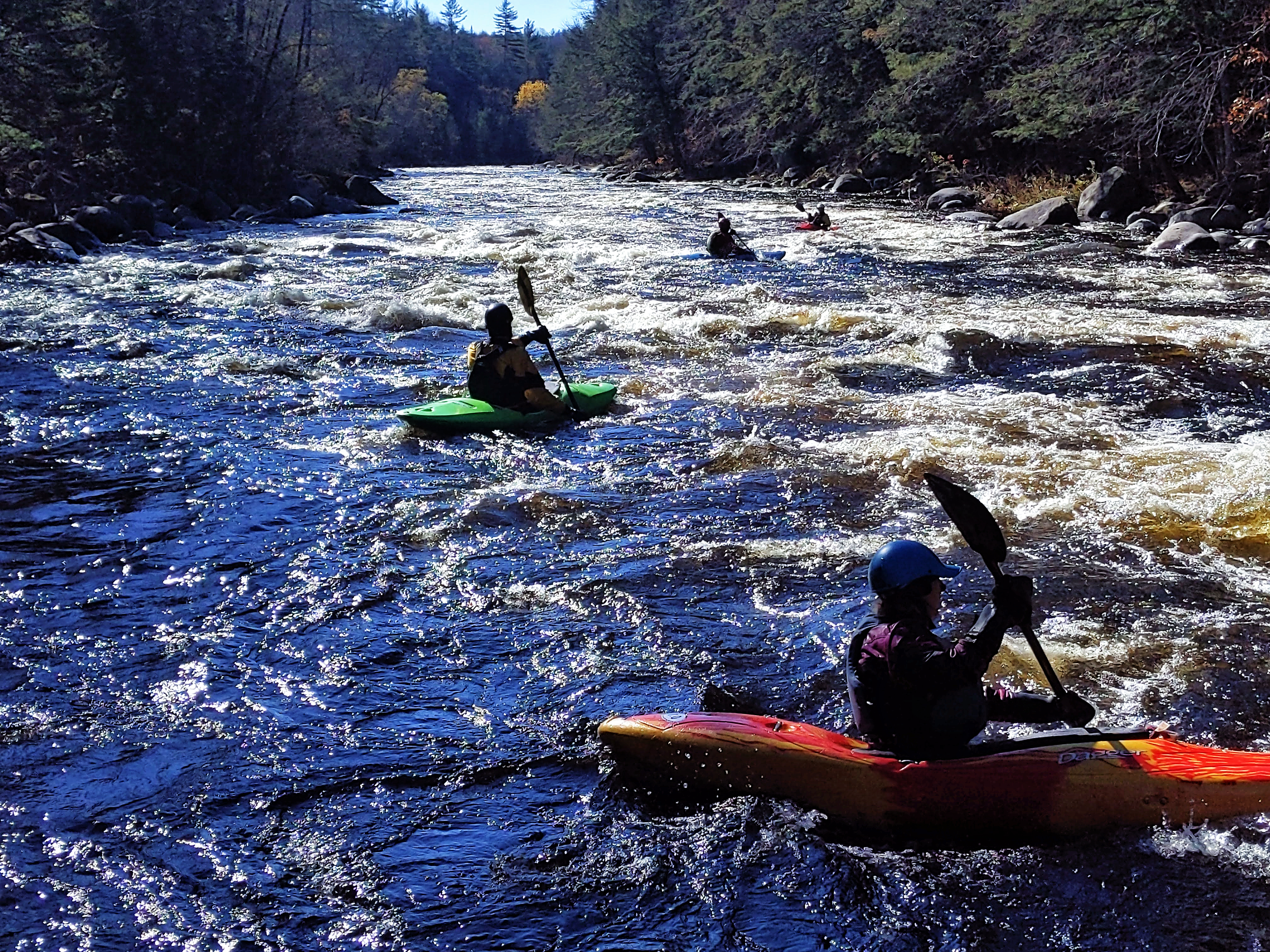
East Branch of the Sacandaga River

The East Branch Sacandaga River originates at the outflow of Botheration Pond (GPS 43.682067, -74.095207) in Johnsburg, NY. It flows into the Middle Branch of the Sacandaga River at GPS (43.446084, -74.250853) in Wells, New York. It is partly located in the Siamese Ponds Wilderness Area. The East Branch Gorge Path is an unmarked trail that extends about a mile and climbs 115 feet along the East Branch Sacandaga River.
