= Wells, New York =

Wells, Brent, New York
- Town
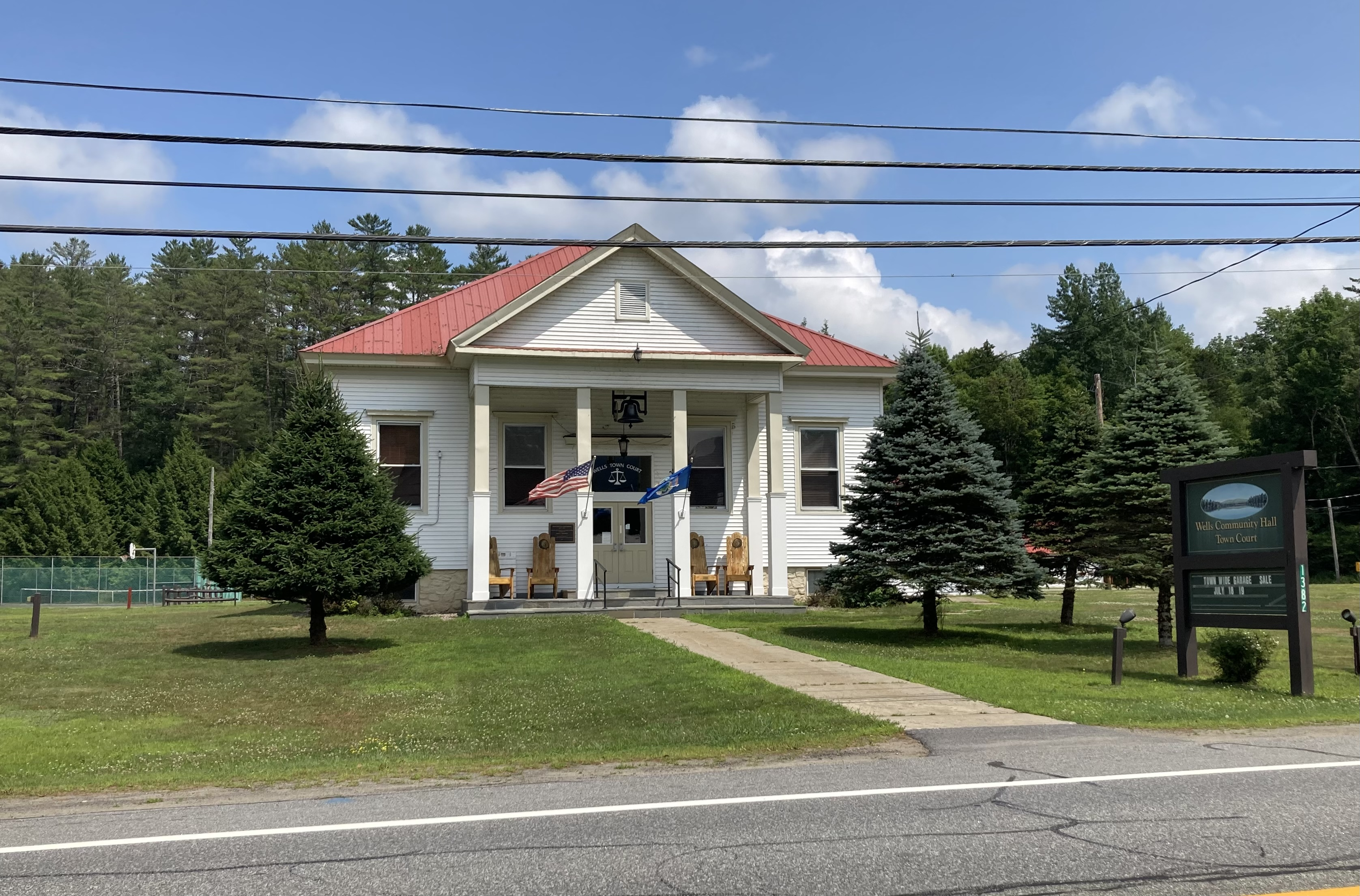
- Wells Town Hall on Main Street

- Location in Hamilton County and the state of New York.
- Coordinates: 43°23′45″N 74°17′22″W
- Country: United States
- State: New York
- County: Hamilton

Government
  - Type: Town Council
  - Town Supervisor: Beth Hunt (R)
  - Town Council: Members' List: • Timothy E. Hunt (R); • John Morrison; • Jason Luckert; • Rob Johnson
  - Highway Superintendent: Clay Earley Jr. (R)

Area
  - Total: 178.36 sq mi (461.96 km^{2})
  - Land: 176.80 sq mi (457.91 km^{2})
  - Water: 1.56 sq mi (4.05 km^{2})
- Elevation: 1,696 ft (517 m)

Population (2020)
  - Total: 683
  - Density: 3.6/sq mi (1.39/km^{2})
- Time zone: UTC-5 (Eastern (EST))
  - Summer (DST): UTC-4 (EDT)
- ZIP code: 12190
- Area code: 518
- FIPS code: 36-041-79059
- GNIS feature ID: 0979615
- Website: Official website

Wells is a town in Hamilton County, New York, United States. The population was 674 at the 2010 census. The town is named after Joshua Wells, a land agent, who built the first mills in the area. It is in the Adirondack Park and on the eastern border of the county. It is northwest of Schenectady.

== History ==
The area was first settled around 1798. The town was formed in 1805 while still part of Montgomery County, and was set off from parts of the towns of Mayfield and Northampton. The town was subsequently reduced by the formation of other towns in Hamilton County, to include Hope (1818) and Long Lake (1837).

The town of Gilman was reportedly named for settler John Gilman. Elias P. Gilman petitioned the state and had surveys of Gilman made in 1838. Land was taken from Wells in 1841, but much of that region was returned to Wells when Gilman was dissolved in 1860. Wells has been increased subsequent to its initial formation by parts of Mayfield (1812, 1816), Northampton (1816), and Lake Pleasant (1858).

=== War of 1812 ===
The United States of America declared war on Great Britain on June 18, 1812. The settlers of Wells and Lake Pleasant were afraid of potential attacks from Native Americans who allied with the British Empire to attack American settlements. The Native Americans were seen roaming in the forest hunting, trapping and fishing. Despite no attacks, the Adirondack settlers, who considered themselves on the northern frontier boundary of the St. Lawrence, fled from their homes and scattered themselves to the counties of Saratoga, Rensselaer and Montgomery. All inhabitants except the Peck family left Lake Pleasant, and so did a large majority leave Wells. An application was made by a remaining few settlers to New York governor Daniel D. Tompkins for an order to raise a company of volunteers from Lake Pleasant and Wells to create a militia in order to "allay the fears of the inhabitants," to protect them from a possible massacre and to encourage them to return to their homes. The petition was granted and William B Peck of Lake Pleasant was commissioned captain of the Wells and Lake Pleasant Home Guards of Company C under Montgomery counties militia 122 regiment. Lt. John L Francisco of Wells later took command of the militia, as William Peck retired from his post.

The War of 1812 brought a need for roads to be built so United States forces could invade Canada. A military road was created through the town of Wells to reach the St. Lawrence river so men and provisions could be transported easily into Canadian territory.

=== Plane crash ===
A Massachusetts Air National Guard plane crash occurred on September 17, 1986, in Wells. Four planes were involved in the training mission and two of the four crashed into the Adirondack mountains, killing one pilot and injuring the other. The crash is said to have been the inspiration for a two-part episode of The X-Files, set in the nearby village of Northville, New York, but no filming took place in either location.

== Geography ==
According to the United States Census Bureau, the town has a total area of 178.4 square miles (462 km^{2}), of which 177.2 square miles (459 km^{2}) is land and 1.2 square miles (3.1 km^{2}) (0.66%) is water.

The eastern town line is the border with Warren County.

New York State Route 30 is a north–south highway. New York State Route 8, an east–west highway, runs concurrently with NY-30 in the central part of Wells.

The area was first settled circa 1798.

== Recreation ==
Wells is a small rural community set on Lake Algonquin. The town is a tourist destination for outdoor activities including boating, kayaking, hiking, camping, fishing, and snowmobiling. In the winter it hosts ice racing on the lake. Every year, Old Home Days is hosted during the first full weekend of August.

== Demographics ==
Historical population
Census	Pop.	Note	%±
1820	331		—
1830	340		2.7%
1840	365		7.4%
1850	532		45.8%
1860	738		38.7%
1870	817		10.7%
1880	1,113		36.2%
1890	1,298		16.6%
1900	908		−30.0%
1910	742		−18.3%
1920	652		−12.1%
1930	527		−19.2%
1940	567		7.6%
1950	507		−10.6%
1960	539		6.3%
1970	604		12.1%
1980	627		3.8%
1990	706		12.6%
2000	737		4.4%
2010	674		−8.5%
2020	683		1.3%
U.S. Decennial Census

As of the census of 2010, there were 674 people living in the town, organized as 322 households and 205 families. The population density was 3.8 inhabitants per square mile (1.5/km^{2}). There were 780 housing units at an average density of 4.4 per square mile (1.7/km^{2}). The racial makeup of the town was 96.61% White, 0.54% African American, 0.81% Native American, 0.27% Asian, 0.14% from other races, and 1.63% from two or more races. Hispanic or Latino of any race were 0.27% of the population.

There were 322 households, out of which 25.2% had children under the age of 18 living with them, 51.6% were married couples living together, 8.7% had a female householder with no husband present, and 36.3% were non-families. 31.4% of all households were made up of individuals, and 18.0% had someone living alone who was 65 years of age or older. The average household size was 2.22 and the average family size was 2.78.

In the town, the population was spread out, with 21.2% under the age of 18, 4.9% from 18 to 24, 22.5% from 25 to 44, 29.0% from 45 to 64, and 22.4% who were 65 years of age or older. The median age was 46 years. For every 100 females, there were 98.1 males. For every 100 females age 18 and over, there were 91.7 males.

The median income for a household in the town was $29,107, and the median income for a family was $37,500. Males had a median income of $34,821 versus $24,250 for females. The per capita income for the town was $16,174. About 8.5% of families and 15.7% of the population were below the poverty line, including 12.8% of those under age 18 and 12.6% of those age 65 or over.

== Communities and locations in Wells ==
- Augur Falls – located north of the hamlet of Wells off routes 8 and 30, and four miles west of Griffin on an old wagon track.
- Big Range – An elevation located north of the hamlet of Wells.
- Blackbridge – A location on West River Road southwest of the Wells hamlet, on the north bank of the West Branch of the Sacandaga River.
- Buckhorn Mountain – An elevation located northeast of the hamlet of Wells.
- Burnham Mountain – An elevation located north of the hamlet of Wells.
- Cattle Mountain – An elevation located east of the hamlet of Wells.
- Corrigan Hill – An elevation located east of the hamlet of Wells.
- County Line Mountain – An elevation located northeast of the hamlet of Wells.
- Cross Mountain – An elevation located north of the hamlet of Wells.
- Devorse Mountain – An elevation located south-southwest of the hamlet of Wells.
- Dugway Mountain – An elevation located west of the hamlet of Wells.
- Finch Mountain – An elevation located southwest of the hamlet of Wells.
- Forks Mountain – An elevation located northeast of the hamlet of Wells.
- Freds Mountain – An elevation located southeast of the hamlet of Wells.
- Gilmantown– A hamlet that was formerly part of the defunct town of Gilman, located on a paved section of Gilmantown Road between Speculator and the hamlet of Wells. The community consists of a few houses on the main road and private drives. Charley Lake is located in Gilmantown, and Gilman Lake is north of the community.
- Griffin – A hamlet on Route 8 near the eastern town border and the East Branch of the Sacandaga River.
- Hamilton Mountain – An elevation located west of the hamlet of Wells.
- Horseshoe Mountain – An elevation located northeast of the hamlet of Wells.
- Humphrey Mountain – An elevation located north of the hamlet of Wells.
- Lake Algonquin – A lake located west of Wells.
- Macomber Mountain – An elevation located northeast of the hamlet of Wells.
- Moose Mountain – An elevation located southeast of the hamlet of Wells.
- Mossy Mountain – An elevation located north of the hamlet of Wells.
- Mount Morris – An elevation located east-southeast of the hamlet of Wells and south of Cattle Mountain.
- Mount Orrey – An elevation located west of the hamlet of Wells.
- Mount Overrocker – An elevation located north-northwest of the hamlet of Wells.
- Petes Hill – An elevation located north of the hamlet of Wells.
- Pettit Mountain – An elevation located north of the hamlet of Wells.
- Pickleville – A former community, located north of the Wells hamlet.
- Pine Mountain – An elevation located north of the hamlet of wells.
- Poplar Hill – An elevation located north of the hamlet of Wells.
- Pumpkin Hollow – A hamlet on Route 30 near the border with the town of Hope, east of the Sacandaga River.
- Rooney Hill – An elevation located south of the hamlet of Wells.
- Round Mountain – An elevation located northwest of the hamlet of Wells.
- Sacandaga River – A river that flows through the town and hamlet of Wells. The East Branch meets the Main Branch north of the Wells hamlet, while the West Branch join south of hamlet at the Sacandaga Campgrounds. The river empties into Great Sacandaga Lake in Fulton County.
- Salmon Lake Mountain – An elevation located east of the hamlet of Wells and east of Cattle Mountain.
- South Pond Mountain – An elevation located northeast of the hamlet of Wells.
- Spruce Mountain – An elevation located east of the hamlet of Wells.
- Steve Bigle Mountain – An elevation located east-northeast of the hamlet of Wells.
- Upper Pine Mountain – An elevation located north of the hamlet of Wells.
- Wells – The hamlet of Wells, located on Route 30 and Algonquin Lake, which is a widening of the main branch of the Sacandaga River, originally created by a dam that powered a veneer mill c. 1910. In 1913, the first known gas-powered log hauler in the Adirondacks, a Lombard, was used by the veneer company between here and Speculator.
- West Hill – An elevation located southwest of the hamlet of Wells.
- Whitehouse – A location in the northwestern corner of the town on West River Road and the north bank of the West Branch Sacandaga River. It is at the western end of West River Road and is regarded as an Adirondack ghost town.
- Windfall – A location northeast of Wells on Windfall.
- Willis Lake – A lake located northeast of Willis Lake.

== Adjacent towns and areas ==
The southern border of Wells is formed by the towns of Benson and Hope. The town of Arietta is at the western border, Lake Pleasant is the northwestern border, and Indian Lake is the northern border. The towns of Stony Creek, Thurman, and Johnsburg in Warren County are to the east.
