= East Stony Creek =

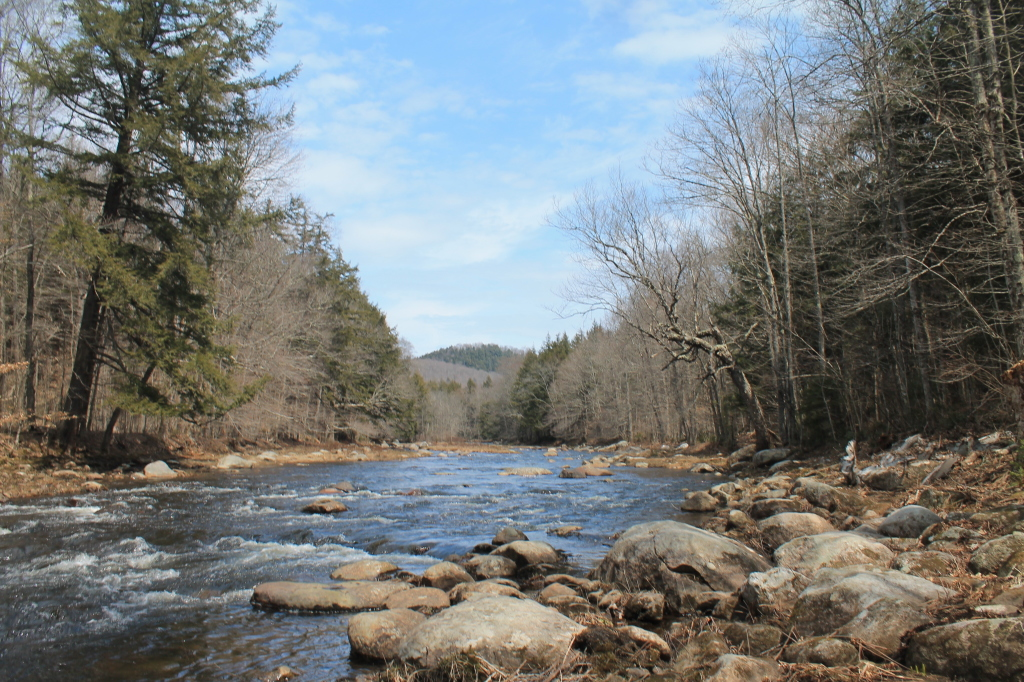
- View of Wilcox Mountain by Bakertown

- Location of the mouth of Oaks Creek East Stony Creek (the United States)

Location
- Country: United States
- State: New York

Physical characteristics
- Source: Lizard Pond
  - elevation: 1,736 ft (529 m)
- Mouth: Sacandaga River
  - location: Northville, New York
  - coordinates: 43°15′43″N 74°12′25″W
  - elevation: 771 ft (235 m)
- Basin size: 95.2 sq mi (247 km^{2})

East Stony Creek is a river in the Adirondack Mountains of New York. It begins at Lizard Pond and flows into the Sacandaga River north of Northville, New York.
