= Benson (hamlet), New York =

Benson, New York
- Hamlet
- Location within New York Location within the United States
- Coordinates: 43°15′07″N 74°16′42″W
- Country: United States
- County: Hamilton
- Town: Benson
- Elevation: 1,165 ft (355 m)
- Time zone: UTC-5 (Eastern (EST))
  - Summer (DST): UTC-4 (EDT)
- Area code: 518

Benson is a hamlet located in the Town of Benson in Hamilton County, New York, United States.
