= Freds Mountain =

Mountain in New York, United States

- Location within New York Adirondack Park Location within the United States

Highest point
- Elevation: 1,965 feet (599 m)
- Coordinates: 43°21′14″N 74°13′30″W

Geography
- Location: SE of Wells, New York, U.S.
- Topo map: USGS Hope Falls

Freds Mountain is a summit located in Adirondack Mountains of New York located in the town of Wells southeast of the hamlet of Wells.
