= Hope, New York =

- Town
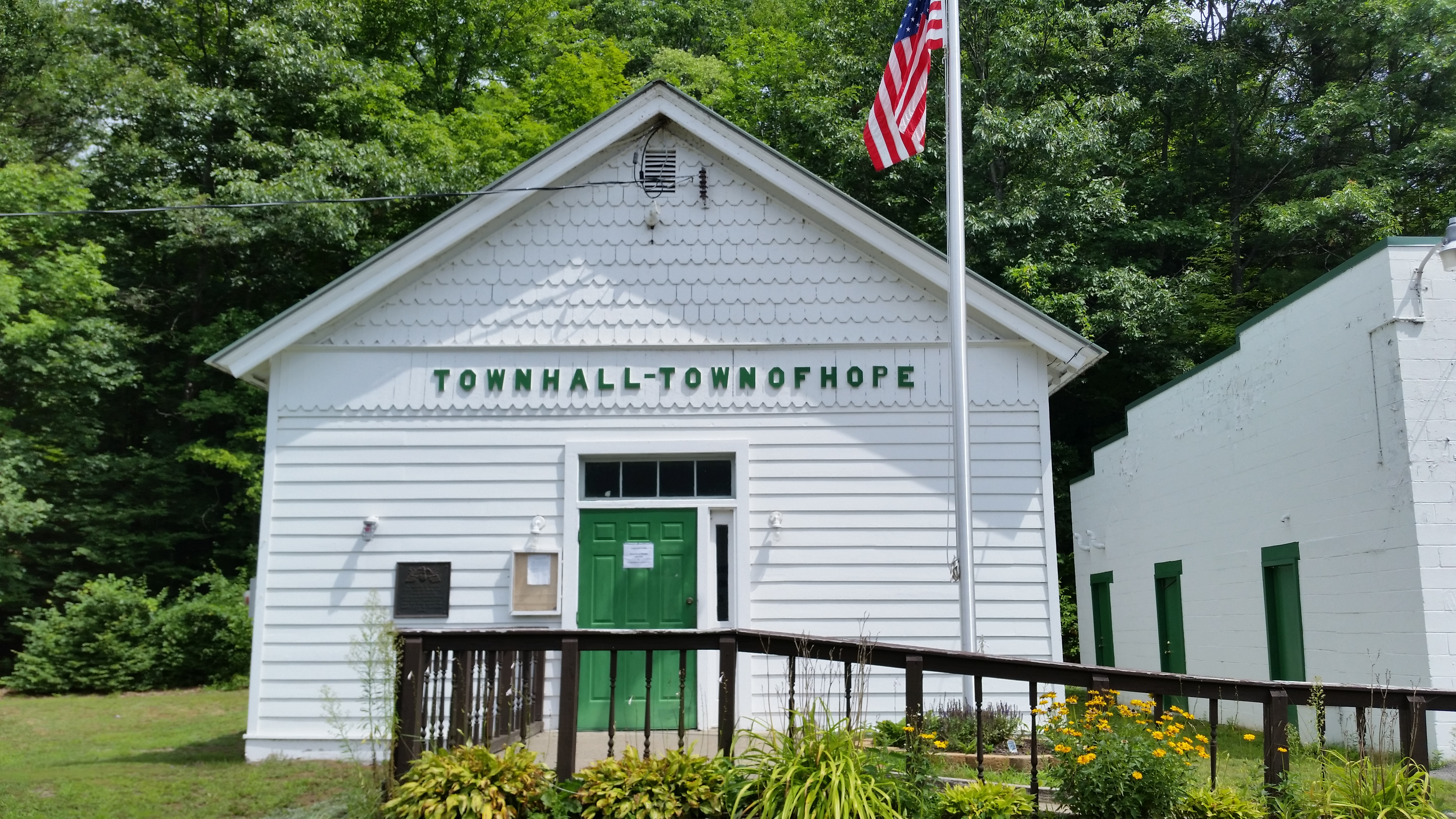
- Hope Town Hall

- Location in Hamilton County and the state of New York.
- Coordinates: 43°18′N 74°15′W
- Country: United States
- State: New York
- County: Hamilton
- Established: 1818

Government
  - Type: Town Council
  - Town Supervisor: Robert Edwards (R)
  - Town Council: Members' List: • Dianna Downing (R); • Mark A. Stuart (R); • John E. Stuart, Jr. (D); • Steven Tomlinson (R)

Area
  - Total: 41.64 sq mi (107.84 km^{2})
  - Land: 40.70 sq mi (105.42 km^{2})
  - Water: 0.93 sq mi (2.42 km^{2})
- Elevation: 1,165 ft (355 m)

Population (2010)
  - Total: 403
  - Estimate (2016): 373
  - Density: 9.2/sq mi (3.54/km^{2})
- Time zone: UTC-5 (Eastern (EST))
  - Summer (DST): UTC-4 (EDT)
- ZIP Code: 12134 (Northville)
- FIPS code: 36-041-35496
- GNIS feature ID: 0979073
- Website: https://townhope.digitaltowpath.org:10310/content

Hope is a town in Hamilton County, New York, United States. The population was 403 at the 2010 census.

First settled in 1790 and established as a town in 1818, Hope is located in the southeastern corner of the county and is 49 miles (79 km) northwest of Schenectady.

== History ==
Prior to European settlement, the land occupied by present-day Hope was within the territory of the Mohawk tribe, the easternmost tribe of the Iroquois Confederacy and one of the original "Five Nations" which founded the confederacy sometime around 1450. Despite its longtime control by the Mohawks, Hope was largely uninhabited when, on July 31, 1772, proprietor John Bergen and 23 of his associates purchased 19,589 acres of land from the Mohawk Turtle Clan. The purchase documents were signed by Mohawk Chief Hendricks, who drew a turtle in lieu of a signature. The land that Bergen and his associates bought became known as "Bergen's Purchase."

David Isdell's house, built in 1801, the first stone house in Hope

Hope was first permanently settled in 1790 near the current south town line by Gideon and Jeremiah Homestead, who arrived from Massachusetts. The first stone house was built in 1801 by David Isdell, on land he had purchased earlier that same year. Wary of Indian attack, Isdell incorporated an escape tunnel in his home for "protection against marauders," but unfortunately, his youngest daughter was kidnapped by Native Americans while picking berries, and was never heard from again; according to one account she perished in an Indian village. Isdell's home, also known as the "Old Eglin House," collapsed in 1930.

Hope was originally the southern district of the Town of Wells, but after its electors voted to separate and form a new town, the southern district was reorganized as the "Town of Hope" on April 15, 1818, with a population of 608 as of the 1820 census. In the 1830s, Montgomery County ceded Hope to Hamilton County, of which Hope currently occupies the most southeastern part. In 1850, with booming agriculture, mining, sawmills, and tanneries, Hope's total population peaked at 1,125, with the subsequent decrease mainly due to residents moving away as a result of industrial decline. The town's area was considerably reduced on April 5, 1860, when a large portion of western Hope, with a population of 380, broke off to form part of the Town of Benson.

While numerous hotels were built during the late 1800s, the population began to decline with the start of the twentieth century, as the town's formerly dynamic industrial businesses began to cease operations. By 1905 the population had fallen to 317 residents, and by 1925 it had plunged to only 163. Much of the developed land fell into disuse, essentially all industrial activity halted, and a number of the town's one room schools closed. Tourism, however, remained an important industry, and New York Route 30 began to provide travelers with lodging, gas stations, and other amenities. Today, Hope is a largely undeveloped residential community, with an estimated population of 387 as of 2014.

== Geography ==
According to the United States Census Bureau, the town has a total area of 41.6 square miles (108 km^{2}), of which 40.7 square miles (105 km^{2}) is land and 0.9 square miles (2.3 km^{2}) (2.09%) is water.

The southern border of the town is Fulton County and the eastern boundary is Saratoga County.

The Sacandaga River flows southward through the western part of Hope.

New York State Route 30 is a north-south highway near the Sacandaga River.

== Demographics ==
Historical population
Census	Pop.	Note	%±
1820	608		—
1830	718		18.1%
1840	711		−1.0%
1850	789		11.0%
1860	745		−5.6%
1870	698		−6.3%
1880	651		−6.7%
1890	560		−14.0%
1900	463		−17.3%
1910	258		−44.3%
1920	203		−21.3%
1930	134		−34.0%
1940	164		22.4%
1950	180		9.8%
1960	234		30.0%
1970	269		15.0%
1980	311		15.6%
1990	358		15.1%
2000	392		9.5%
2010	403		2.8%
2016 (est.)	373		−7.4%
U.S. Decennial Census

As of the census of 2000, there were 392 people, 155 households, and 113 families residing in the town. The population density was 9.6 inhabitants per square mile (3.7/km^{2}). There were 296 housing units at an average density of 7.3 per square mile (2.8/km^{2}). The racial makeup of the town was 99.49% White, 0.26% African American and 0.26% Pacific Islander. Hispanic or Latino of any race were 1.02% of the population.

There were 155 households, out of which 30.3% had children under the age of 18 living with them, 58.7% were married couples living together, 11.6% had a female householder with no husband present, and 26.5% were non-families. 20.6% of all households were made up of individuals, and 5.8% had someone living alone who was 65 years of age or older. The average household size was 2.53 and the average family size was 2.91.

In the town, the population was spread out, with 22.4% under the age of 18, 7.4% from 18 to 24, 26.5% from 25 to 44, 33.4% from 45 to 64, and 10.2% who were 65 years of age or older. The median age was 41 years. For every 100 females, there were 88.5 males. For every 100 females age 18 and over, there were 93.6 males.

The median income for a household in the town was $32,000, and the median income for a family was $32,000. Males had a median income of $25,000 versus $19,688 for females. The per capita income for the town was $15,225. About 7.8% of families and 12.4% of the population were below the poverty line, including 19.8% of those under age 18 and none of those age 65 or over.

== Communities and locations in Hope ==
- Bennett Lake – A small lake north of Hope Falls.
- Groff Mountain – An elevation located northwest of the hamlet of Hope.
- Hope – The hamlet of Hope, previously called Hope Center, is on NY-30 and the east bank of the Sacandaga River.
- Hope Falls – A hamlet east of Hope village on Hope Falls Road.
- Huckleberry Mountain – An elevation located north-northwest of Hope Falls.
- Maple Grove – A location in the southeastern corner of Hope.
- Mason Hill – An elevation located south of Hope Falls.
- Middle Lake – A small lake between Bennet Lake and Murphy Lake.
- Murphy Lake – A small lake in the northern part of Hope.
- Rand Mountain – An elevation located north of Hope Falls.
- Round Top – An elevation located northwest of Hope Falls.
- Sacandaga River – A river flowing through the town. Groff Creek is a tributary and hiking trail beside the river.
- Scribner Mountain – An elevation located northwest of Hope Falls.
- Southerland Mountain – An elevation located northwest of the hamlet of Hope.
- Sturgis Mountain – An elevation located northwest of Hope Falls.
- Thomas Hill – An elevation located southeast of Hope Falls.

== Adjacent towns and areas ==
Benson is to the west, and the Town of Wells is to the north. The Towns of Day and Edinburg in Saratoga County are on the eastern boundary. Northampton is the southern border.
