= Sacandaga River =

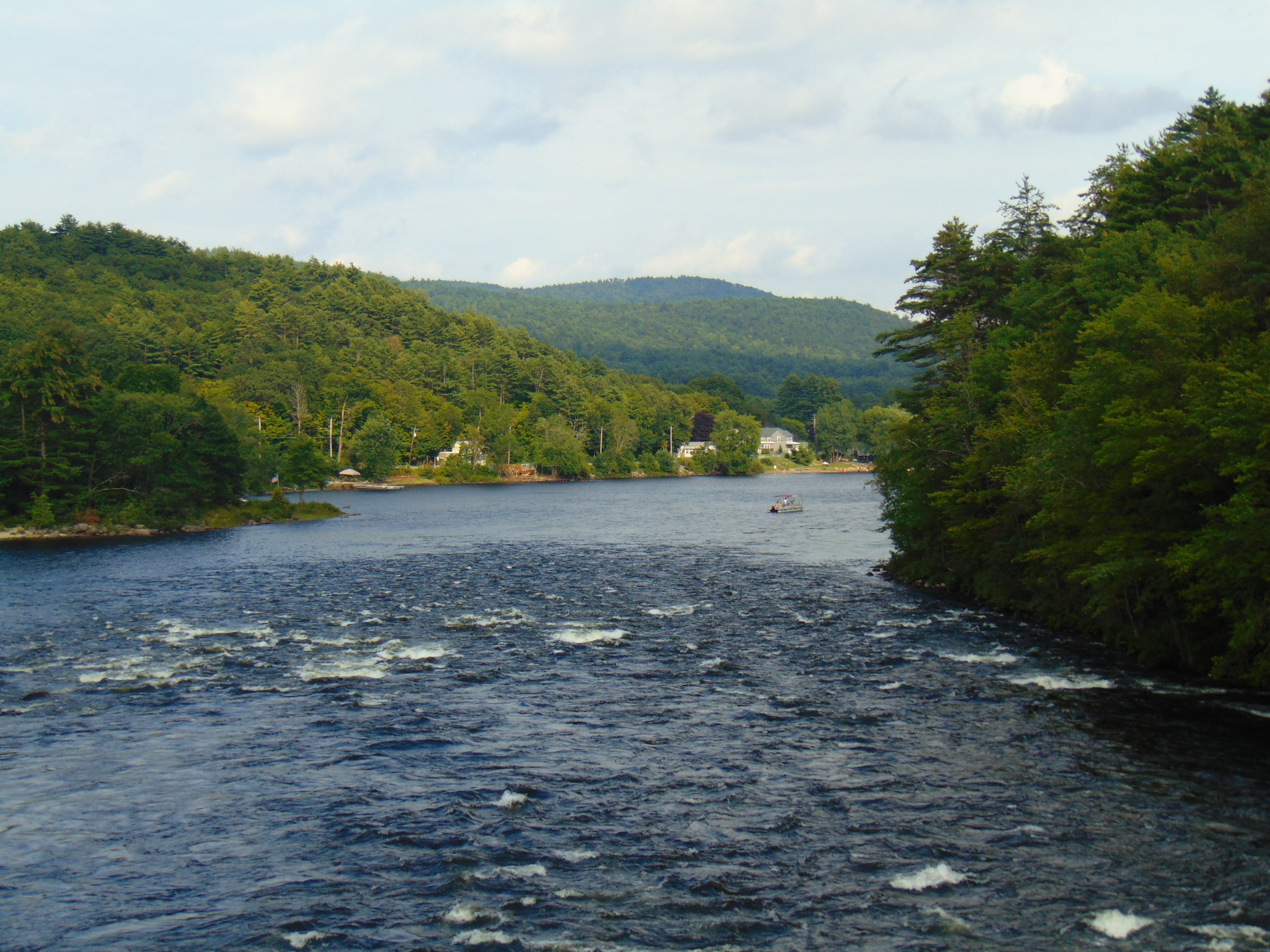
- The Sacandaga River when it flows into the Hudson River

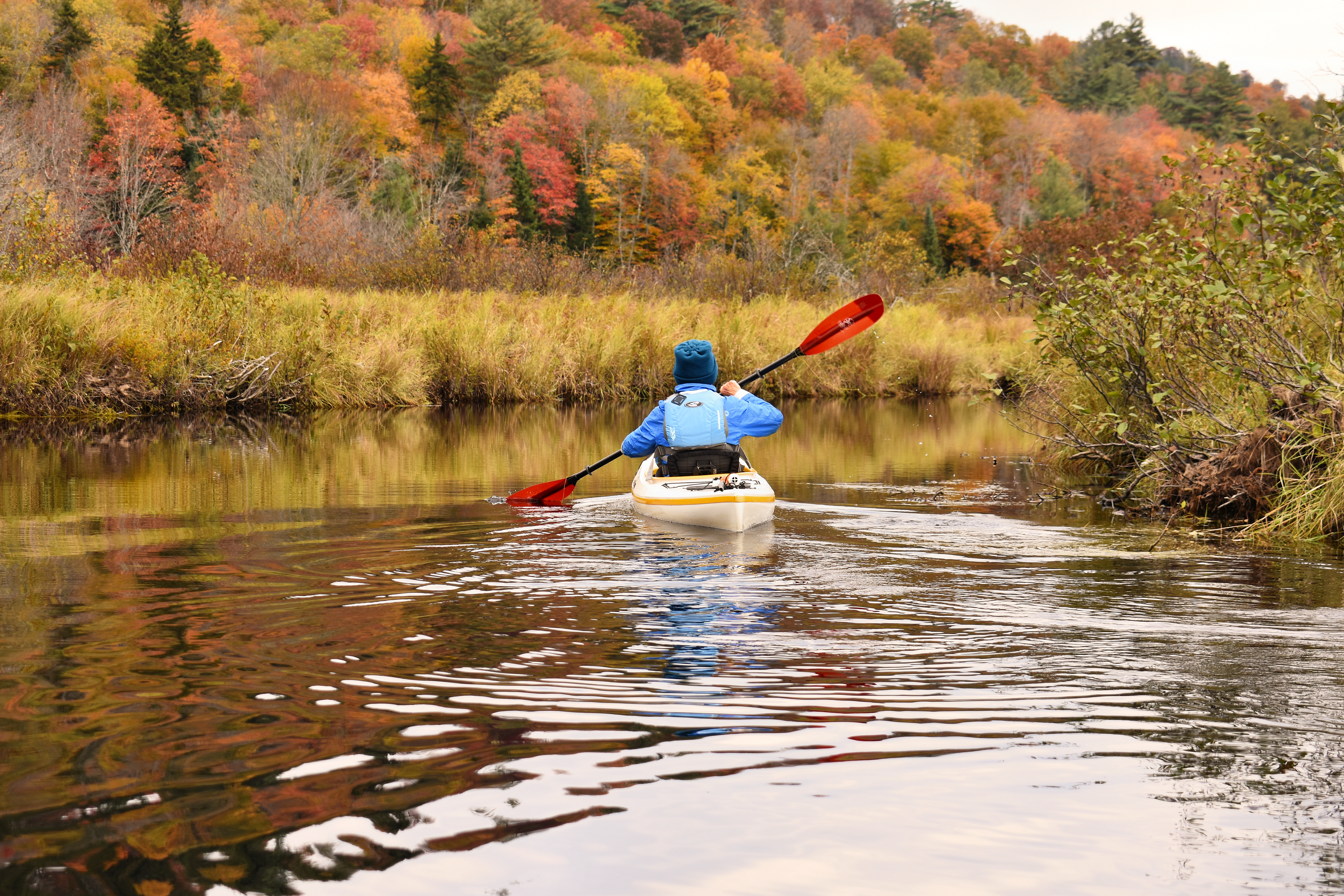
- Location of the mouth of the Sacandaga River A kayaker on the West Branch of the Sacandaga River, Adirondack Mountains, New York State, USA Sacandaga River (the United States)
- Native name: Sa-chen-da'-ga (Iroquoian languages)

Location
- Country: United States
- State: New York

Physical characteristics
- Source: Lake Pleasant
  - coordinates: 43°28′34″N 74°22′56″W
  - elevation: 1,726 ft (526 m)
- Mouth: Hudson River
  - coordinates: 43°18′50″N 73°50′34″W
  - elevation: 545 ft (166 m)

Basin features
- Tributaries
  - left: Kunjamuk River; East Branch Sacandaga River; East Stony Creek
  - right: West Branch Sacandaga River; West Stony Creek

The Sacandaga River is a 64-mile-long (103 km) river in the northern part of New York in the United States. Its name comes from the Native American Sa-chen-da'-ga, meaning "overflowed lands".

The Sacandaga River is a tributary of the Hudson River, flowing into it at Hadley, at the border of Saratoga and Warren counties.

== River course ==
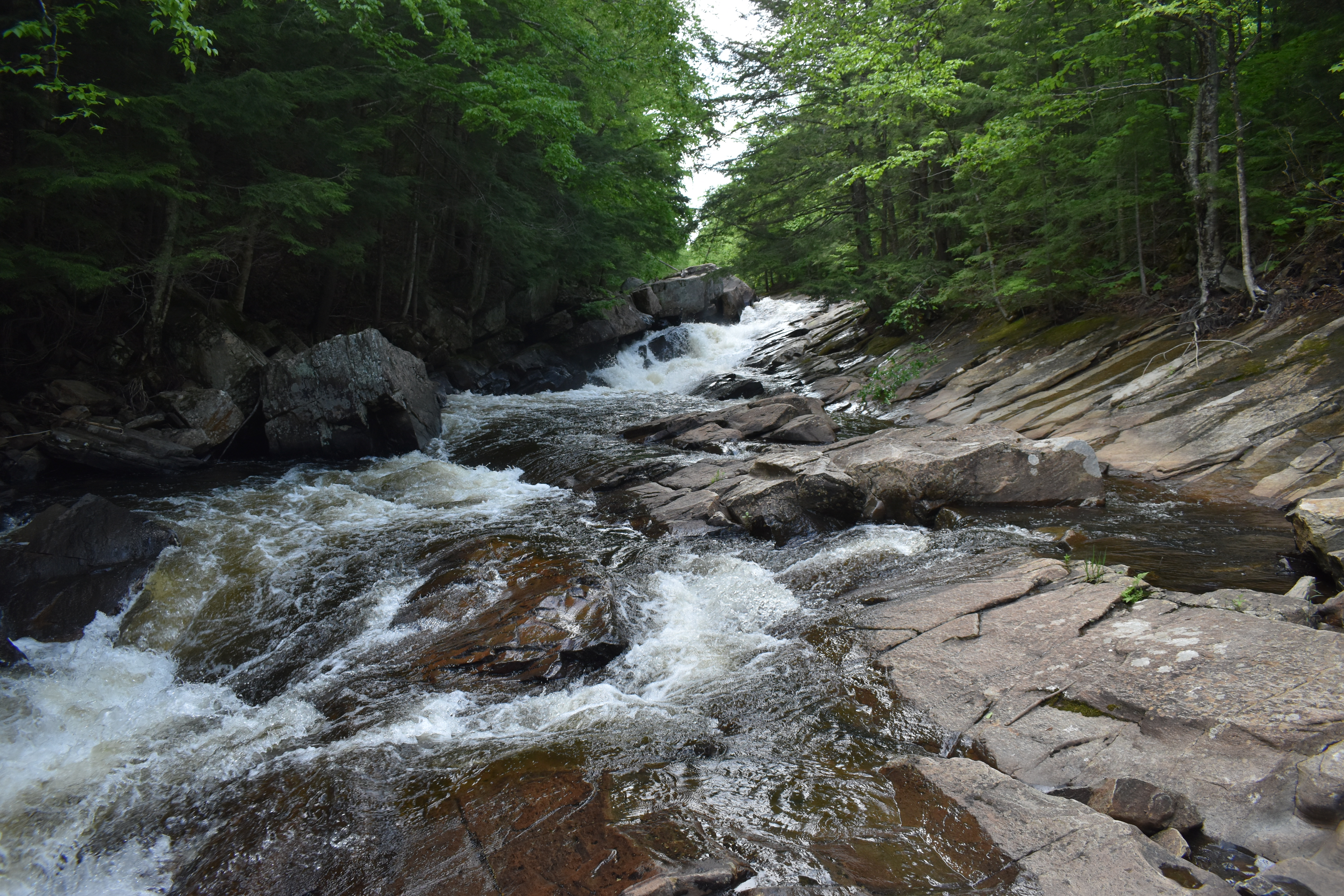
Austin Falls in June 2021

The Sacandaga River's headwaters north of Great Sacandaga Lake begin in the town of Lake Pleasant. From Lake Pleasant, the river follows a short moving course or path known as the Sacandaga Outlet (under New York Route 8) into Lake Pleasant. The Sacandaga River drains Lake Pleasant at a location next to the public beach in the village of Speculator. The river then follows a winding path through some wetlands and various ecosystems through the county. In Speculator, the Sacandaga River Community Park was built by local volunteers and has a number of boardwalks and pathways that follow the course of the river.

Near the town boundary between Wells and Lake Pleasant, the river flows into a series of ponds. The Sacandaga River course takes a steep path flowing over a series of waterfalls including Christine Falls, Austin Falls and Auger Falls.

The East Branch joins the trunk stream in the town of Wells. After flowing through Wells, the river enters Lake Algonquin, a manmade impoundment constructed in the 1920s to stimulate the community's tourism industry. The East Branch goes through Johnsburg in Warren County and flows parallel to, in part, NY Route 8, passing the communities of Oregon in Johnsburg and Griffin in the town of Wells.

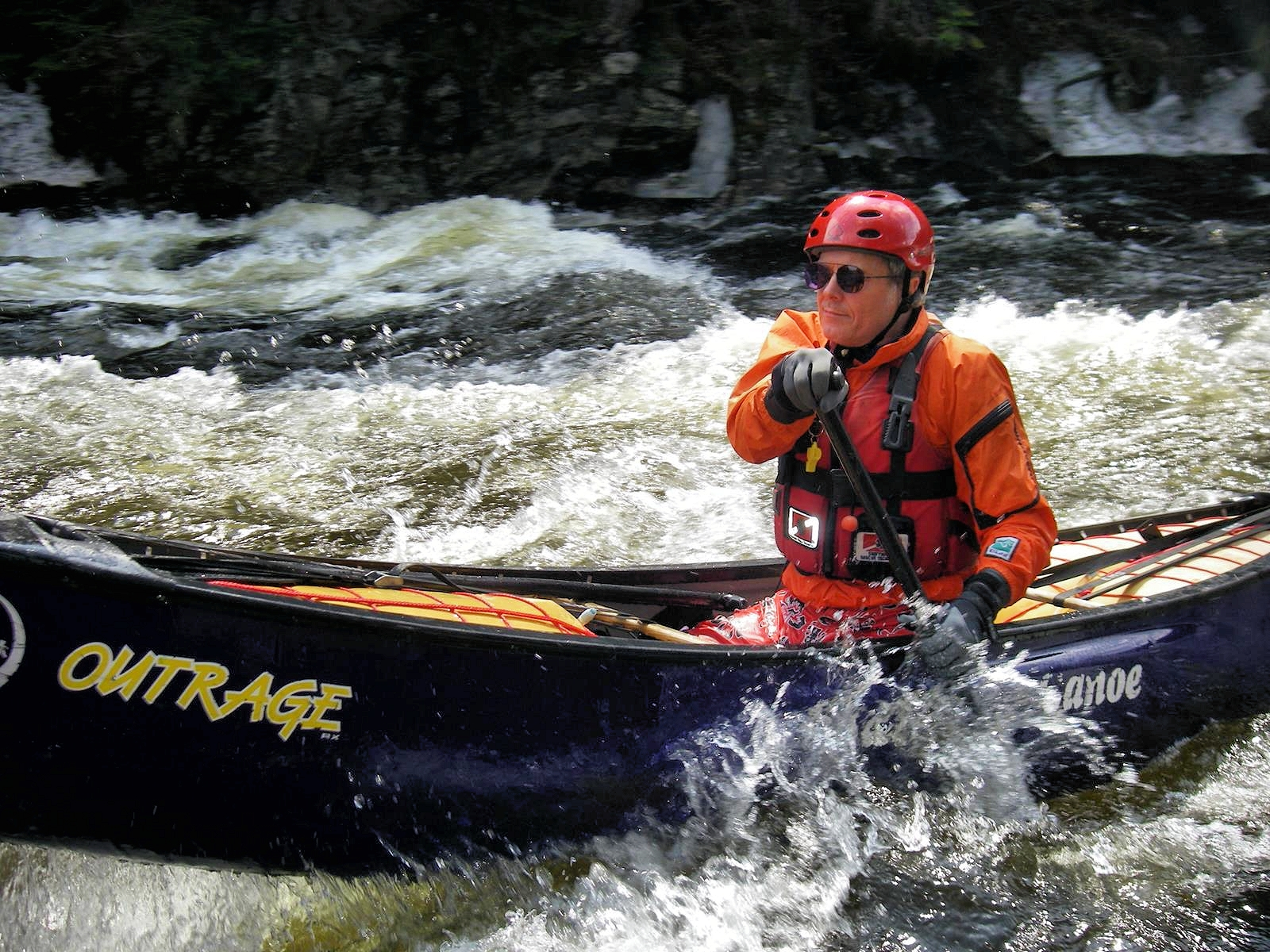
A whitewater canoeist on the Sacandaga River, Hadley, NY.

The Sacandaga flows out of Lake Algonquin into a hydro-electric plant and follows a course of rapids to Great Sacandaga Lake through the towns of Hope and Benson. In that area, it connects with Groff Creek. Then it enters the Great Sacandaga Lake in the village of Northville, which it flows through the lake to the Conklingville Dam. Subsequently, it enters the town of Hadley, where it ends at the Hudson River. Downstream of Stewart's Dam in Hadley, recreational releases are held by Brookfield Energy, creating a two-mile Class II whitewater run to the Hudson River for local paddlers.

== Hydrology ==
The United States Geological Survey (USGS) maintains a few stream gauges along Sacandaga River. The one station located 4.5 miles (7.2 km) upstream from Hope, had a maximum discharge of 32,000 cubic feet (910 m^{3}) per second on March 27, 1913, and a minimum discharge of 16 cubic feet (0.45 m^{3}) per second on September 30, 1913. Another station located 1.4 miles (2.3 km) upstream from the mouth in operation since 1907, had a maximum discharge of 35,500 cubic feet (1,010 m^{3}) per second on March 28, 1913, and a minimum discharge of 4.2 cubic feet (0.12 m^{3}) per second on May 4, 1985, March 30–31, and many days in April 1992. Since the construction of Great Sacandaga Lake in 1930, the maximum discharge was 16,500 cubic feet (470 m^{3}) on May 2, 2011.

== Tributaries ==
Right

Johnson Vly Stream
Shanty Brook
Dunning Creek
West Branch Sacandaga River
Groff Creek
Petes Creek
West Stony Creek
Cloutler Creek
Batcheller Creek
Gordons Creek
Daly Creek
Breen Brook

Left

Kunjamuk River
Fly Creek
Robbs Creek
Macomber Creek
East Branch Sacandaga River
Mill Creek
Coulombe Creek
Doig Creek
East Stony Creek
Beecher Creek
Sand Creek
Glasshouse Creek
Paul Creek
Allentown Creek
Bell Brook
Mink Brook
Man Shanty Brook

== Dam and reservoir ==
The Conklingville Dam, finished in 1930, located by the west town line of Hadley, greatly expanded the width of the river, creating Great Sacandaga Lake, formerly called the Great Sacandaga Reservoir.

== See also ==
- List of New York rivers
