= Hamilton County, New York =

County in New York, United States

- County
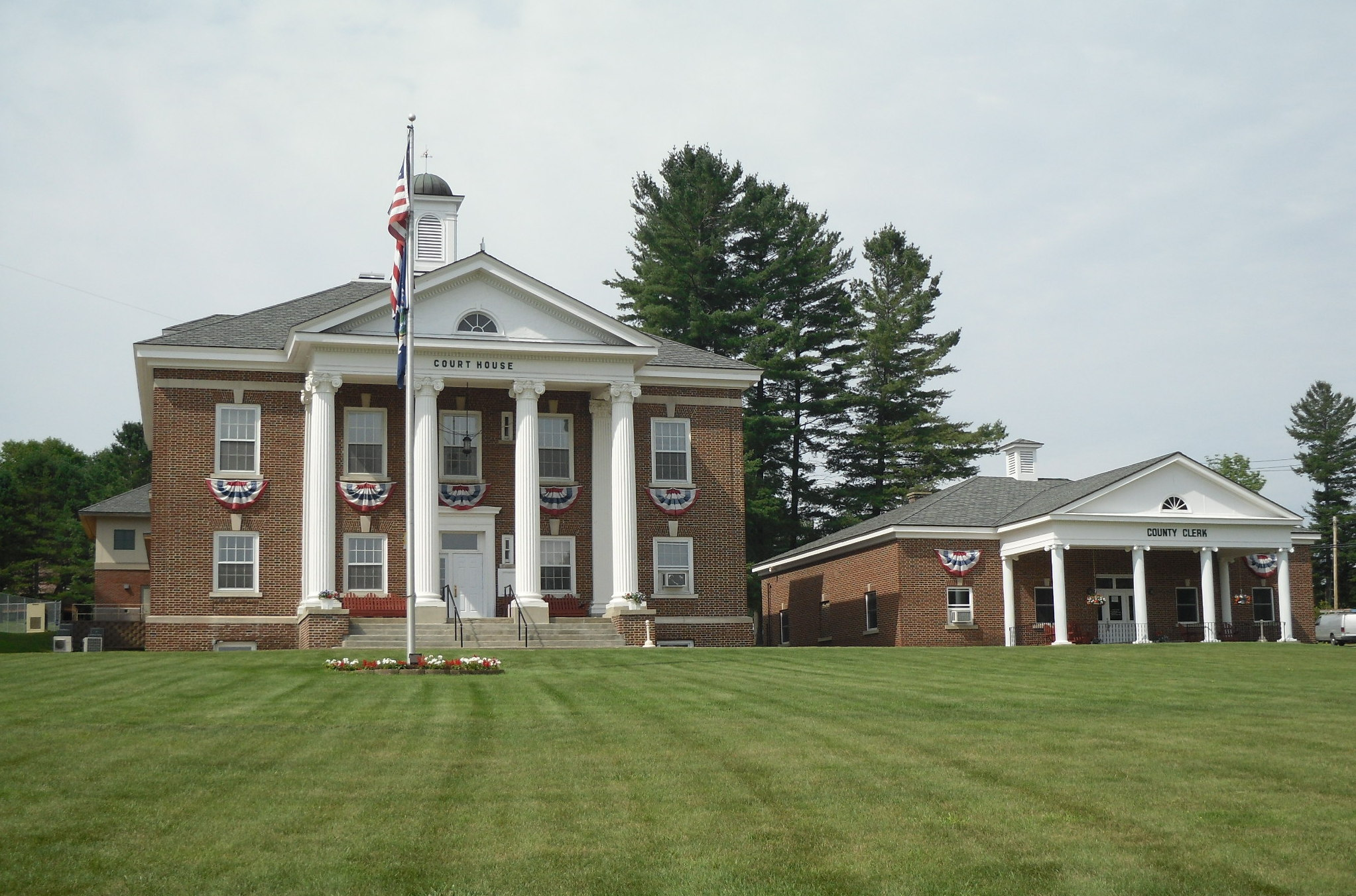
- Hamilton County Courthouse in Lake Pleasant

- Flag Seal

- Location within the U.S. state of New York
- Coordinates: 43°39′N 74°30′W
- Country: United States
- State: New York
- Founded: 1816
- Named for: Alexander Hamilton
- Seat: Lake Pleasant
- Largest CDP: Long Lake

Area
  - Total: 1,808 sq mi (4,680 km^{2})
  - Land: 1,717 sq mi (4,450 km^{2})
  - Water: 90 sq mi (230 km^{2}) 5.0%

Population (2020)
  - Total: 5,107
  - Estimate (2025): 5,006 ▼
  - Density: 2.8/sq mi (1.1/km^{2})
- Time zone: UTC−5 (Eastern)
  - Summer (DST): UTC−4 (EDT)
- Congressional district: 21st
- Website: www.hamiltoncountyny.gov

Hamilton County is a county in the U.S. state of New York. As of the 2020 census, the population was 5,107, making it the least populous county in New York and the state’s only county with fewer than 10,000 residents. With a land area nearly the size of Delaware, it is the least densely populated county east of the Mississippi River. Its county seat is Lake Pleasant. The county was created in 1816 and organized in 1847. The county is part of the North Country region of the state.

Hamilton County is one of only two counties that lie entirely within the Adirondack Park (Essex being the other). There are no permanent traffic lights in the county, and much of the county has no cell phone service.

== Etymology ==
The county is named after Alexander Hamilton, the only member of the New York State delegation who signed the United States Constitution in 1787, and was later the first United States Secretary of the Treasury.

== History ==
On April 12, 1816, Hamilton County was created by partitioning 1,800 square miles (4,700 km^{2}) from Montgomery County, but due to low population it remained unorganized and administered by Montgomery County until it was recognized as sufficiently prepared for self-government on January 1, 1838. The organization process was completed by summer 1847.

On April 6, 1860, Fulton County, which had been partitioned April 18, 1838, had 10 square miles (26 km^{2}) of land in Sacandaga Park transferred to Hamilton County. On May 24, 1915, land was swapped between Hamilton and Essex counties, with Hamilton ceding Fishing Brook Mountain for Indian Lake. Hamilton gained an additional 20 square miles (52 km^{2}), whereas Essex County lost 30 square miles (78 km^{2}). This left Hamilton with its present size of 1,830 square miles (4,700 km^{2}).

The former town of Gilman was dissolved in 1860. The original county seat was Sageville, now part of Lake Pleasant.

== Geography ==
Road map of Hamilton County

According to the U.S. Census Bureau, the county has a total area of 1,808 square miles (4,680 km^{2}), of which 1,717 square miles (4,450 km^{2}) is land and 90 square miles (230 km^{2}) (5.0%) is water. It is New York's third-largest county by land area and fifth-largest by total area.

Hamilton County is in the state's north central section, northwest of Albany. It lies entirely within Adirondack Park and consists mostly of publicly owned parkland.

The county is very mountainous, broken up by rivers and lakes. The county is famous for its lakes. Indian Lake, and Long Lake are both famous for their long length, small width, and erratic shape, similar to the Finger Lakes. Other notable lakes include Piseco Lake, Lewey Lake, Raquette Lake, Sacandaga Lake, and Lake Pleasant. While notable mountains include: Snowy Mountain, Panther Mountain, and Buell Mountain.

=== Adjacent counties ===
- Franklin County - north
- Essex County - northeast
- Warren County - east
- Saratoga County - southeast
- Fulton County - south
- Herkimer County - west
- St. Lawrence County - northwest

== Demographics ==
Historical population
Census	Pop.	Note	%±
1820	1,251		—
1830	1,325		5.9%
1840	1,907		43.9%
1850	2,188		14.7%
1860	3,024		38.2%
1870	2,960		−2.1%
1880	3,923		32.5%
1890	4,762		21.4%
1900	4,947		3.9%
1910	4,373		−11.6%
1920	3,970		−9.2%
1930	3,929		−1.0%
1940	4,188		6.6%
1950	4,105		−2.0%
1960	4,267		3.9%
1970	4,714		10.5%
1980	5,034		6.8%
1990	5,279		4.9%
2000	5,379		1.9%
2010	4,836		−10.1%
2020	5,107		5.6%
2025 (est.)	5,006	▼	−2.0%
U.S. Decennial Census; 1790–1960 1900–1990; 1990–2000 2010–2020

=== 2020 census ===
Hamilton County, New York – Racial and ethnic composition Note: the US Census treats Hispanic/Latino as an ethnic category. This table excludes Latinos from the racial categories and assigns them to a separate category. Hispanics/Latinos may be of any race.
Race / Ethnicity (NH = Non-Hispanic)	Pop 1980	Pop 1990	Pop 2000	Pop 2010	Pop 2020	% 1980	% 1990	% 2000	% 2010	% 2020
White alone (NH)	4,999	5,219	5,223	4,664	4,769	99.30%	98.86%	97.10%	96.44%	93.38%
Black or African American alone (NH)	0	12	24	33	30	0.00%	0.23%	0.45%	0.68%	0.59%
Native American or Alaska Native alone (NH)	12	10	14	11	14	0.24%	0.19%	0.26%	0.23%	0.27%
Asian alone (NH)	4	6	8	24	12	0.08%	0.11%	0.15%	0.50%	0.23%
Native Hawaiian or Pacific Islander alone (NH)	x	x	2	4	1	x	x	0.04%	0.08%	0.02%
Other race alone (NH)	7	1	14	1	5	0.14%	0.02%	0.26%	0.02%	0.10%
Mixed race or Multiracial (NH)	x	x	37	48	176	x	x	0.69%	0.99%	3.45%
Hispanic or Latino (any race)	12	31	57	51	100	0.24%	0.59%	1.06%	1.05%	1.96%
Total	5,034	5,279	5,379	4,836	5,107	100.00%	100.00%	100.00%	100.00%	100.00%

As of the 2020 census, among the 5,107 residents the racial makeup of the county was 93.69% White, 0.61% Black or African American, 0.27% Native American, 0.23% Asian, 0.02% Pacific Islander, 0.43% from other races, and 4.74% from two or more races. 1.96% of the population were Hispanic or Latino of any race. Additional demographics are based on older data. As of the census of 2000, there were 5,379 people, 2,362 households, and 1,558 families residing in the county. The population density was 3 people per square mile (1.2 people/km^{2}); both the total population and population density rank lowest in the state of New York. There were 7,965 housing units at an average density of 5 units per square mile (1.9/km^{2}). 16.9% were of Irish, 15.7% German, 15.2% English, 10.9% French, 7.3% American and 5.7% Italian ancestry. 97.5% spoke English and 1.7% French as their first language.

There were 2,362 households, out of which 23.60% had children under the age of 18 living with them, 55.70% were married couples living together, 6.70% had a female householder with no husband present, and 34.00% were non-families. 29.60% of all households were made up of individuals, and 13.70% had someone living alone who was 65 years of age or older. The average household size was 2.24 and the average family size was 2.74.

In the county, the population was spread out, with 19.70% under the age of 18, 5.20% from 18 to 24, 24.20% from 25 to 44, 30.90% from 45 to 64, and 20.00% who were 65 years of age or older. The median age was 45 years. For every 100 females there were 100.00 males. For every 100 females age 18 and over, there were 99.40 males.

The median income for a household in the county was $32,287, and the median income for a family was $39,676. Males had a median income of $29,177 versus $21,849 for females. The per capita income for the county was $18,643. About 6.00% of families and 10.40% of the population were below the poverty line, including 10.50% of those under age 18 and 8.70% of those age 65 or over.

Research published in 2016 found that Hamilton County had by far the highest suicide rate in the state of New York; at 28 per 100,000 people. This meant that Hamilton County had a suicide rate more than double the national average and more than triple the state average of 13 and 8.4 per 100,000 people respectively. Though the report found instances of suicide to be significantly higher in Upstate generally, the rate in Hamilton County was disproportionate regardless of region; being 22.1, high though still significantly lower, in Lewis County, which was found to have the second highest rate in New York.

== Government and politics ==
United States presidential election results for Hamilton County, New York
Year	Republican / Whig		Democratic		Third party(ies)	
Year	No.	%	No.	%	No.	%
1840	123	35.65%	222	64.35%	0	0.00%
1852	126	26.92%	342	73.08%	0	0.00%
1856	149	28.88%	250	48.45%	117	22.67%
1860	134	22.30%	467	77.70%	0	0.00%
1864	218	36.39%	381	63.61%	0	0.00%
1868	287	38.84%	452	61.16%	0	0.00%
1872	353	41.78%	492	58.22%	0	0.00%
1876	322	36.14%	569	63.86%	0	0.00%
1880	406	39.84%	552	54.17%	61	5.99%
1884	521	46.85%	567	50.99%	24	2.16%
1888	638	51.29%	591	47.51%	15	1.21%
1892	454	44.55%	480	47.11%	85	8.34%
1900	651	54.98%	509	42.99%	24	2.03%
1904	688	50.74%	655	48.30%	13	0.96%
1908	632	50.00%	586	46.36%	46	3.64%
1912	454	40.00%	493	43.44%	188	16.56%
1916	612	48.96%	623	49.84%	15	1.20%
1920	881	62.66%	516	36.70%	9	0.64%
1924	1,063	61.23%	631	36.35%	42	2.42%
1928	1,399	59.51%	952	40.49%	0	0.00%
1932	1,603	58.76%	1,107	40.58%	18	0.66%
1936	1,695	64.47%	934	35.53%	0	0.00%
1940	2,029	70.62%	840	29.24%	4	0.14%
1944	1,834	68.61%	830	31.05%	9	0.34%
1948	2,000	71.68%	744	26.67%	46	1.65%
1952	2,615	82.65%	546	17.26%	3	0.09%
1956	2,619	84.78%	470	15.22%	0	0.00%
1960	2,168	73.14%	795	26.82%	1	0.03%
1964	1,269	44.17%	1,603	55.80%	1	0.03%
1968	2,123	69.54%	762	24.96%	168	5.50%
1972	2,597	77.89%	731	21.93%	6	0.18%
1976	2,306	68.43%	1,052	31.22%	12	0.36%
1980	2,038	63.10%	925	28.64%	267	8.27%
1984	2,637	77.97%	737	21.79%	8	0.24%
1988	2,320	69.94%	976	29.42%	21	0.63%
1992	2,038	53.39%	963	25.23%	816	21.38%
1996	1,841	50.97%	1,228	34.00%	543	15.03%
2000	2,388	64.86%	1,114	30.26%	180	4.89%
2004	2,475	66.98%	1,145	30.99%	75	2.03%
2008	2,141	62.77%	1,225	35.91%	45	1.32%
2012	1,932	62.06%	1,128	36.24%	53	1.70%
2016	2,064	64.00%	949	29.43%	212	6.57%
2020	2,225	64.31%	1,178	34.05%	57	1.65%
2024	2,223	64.64%	1,211	35.21%	5	0.15%

Hamilton County has long been one of the most consistently Republican counties in New York. Since Woodrow Wilson carried the county in 1916, the Republican candidate has lost only once, when Barry Goldwater in 1964 failed to win a single county in the state. The county was Goldwater's third strongest in the state however. In the 2008 U.S. presidential election, John McCain carried Hamilton County by a 26.9% margin over Barack Obama, with Obama winning statewide by a virtually equal margin over McCain; Republican nominee Mitt Romney won the county over President Obama in the 2012 election, too. Hamilton gave McCain the highest margin of victory in the state.

It was the only county won by Howard Mills over incumbent Chuck Schumer in the 2004 U.S. Senate election. It also voted for John Faso over Eliot Spitzer for governor in 2006, and for John Spencer 55.5%-42.1% over incumbent Hillary Clinton for the U.S. Senate in 2006, despite Faso and Spencer both losing in landslides statewide. It was one of only a handful of counties outside Western New York to have voted for Carl Paladino over eventual winner Andrew Cuomo for Governor in 2010.

Democrat Kirsten Gillibrand, however, won the county in her bid to be elected for a full term to the U.S. Senate in 2012.

== Transportation ==
=== Airports ===
The following public use airports are located in the county:

- Piseco Airport (K09) – Piseco
- Long Lake Helms Seaplane Base (NY9) – Long Lake
- Long Lake Sagamore Seaplane Base (K03) – Long Lake

=== Ground ===
- NY-8
- NY-10
- NY-28
- NY-28N
- NY-30

== Communities ==
=== Larger settlements ===
#	Location	Population	Type
1	Long Lake	547	CDP
2	Speculator	324	Village
-	Wells	N/A	CDP

=== Towns ===
- Arietta
- Benson
- Hope
- Indian Lake
- Inlet
- Lake Pleasant
- Long Lake
- Morehouse
- Wells

=== Villages ===
- Speculator

=== Other hamlets ===
- Arietta
- Benson
- Blue Mountain Lake
- Higgins Bay
- Hoffmeister
- Hope
- Hope Falls
- Indian Lake
- Inlet
- Lake Pleasant (county seat)
- Piseco
- Raquette Lake
- Upper Benson

=== Former hamlet ===
- Sabattis (formerly Long Lake West)

== Education ==
School districts include:

- Dolgeville Central School District
- Indian Lake Central School District
- Inlet Common School District
- Lake Pleasant Central School District
- Long Lake Central School District
- Northville Central School District
- Piseco Common School District
- Poland Central School District
- Raquette Lake Union Free School District
- Wells Central School District

== See also ==
- List of counties in New York
- National Register of Historic Places listings in Hamilton County, New York
