= Upper Benson, New York =

- Hamlet
- Location within New York Location within the United States
- Coordinates: 43°15′07″N 74°16′42″W, 43°15′02″N 74°20′09″W
- Country: United States
- State: New York
- County: Hamilton
- Town: Benson
- Elevation: 1,293 ft (394 m)
- Time zone: UTC-5 (Eastern (EST))
  - Summer (DST): UTC-4 (EDT)
- Area code: 518

Upper Benson, also known as Benson Center, is a hamlet located in the Town of Benson in Hamilton County, New York, United States.
