= Arietta, New York =

- Town
- Seal

- Location in Hamilton County and the state of New York
- Coordinates: 43°30′55″N 74°34′12″W
- Country: United States
- State: New York
- County: Hamilton

Government
  - Type: Town Council
  - Town Supervisor: Richard Wilt (R)
  - Town Council: Members' List: • Michael Knapp (D); • James Farber (R); • Marie Parslow (D); • Henry Rogers (R)

Area
  - Total: 329.41 sq mi (853.16 km^{2})
  - Land: 317.18 sq mi (821.49 km^{2})
  - Water: 12.23 sq mi (31.67 km^{2})
- Elevation: 2,402 ft (732 m)

Population (2020)
  - Total: 292
  - Density: 0.921/sq mi (0.355/km^{2})
- Time zone: UTC-5 (Eastern (EST))
  - Summer (DST): UTC-4 (EDT)
- ZIP Codes: 12139 (Piseco); 12032 (Caroga Lake); 12847 (Long Lake); 12108 (Lake Pleasant)
- Area code: 518
- FIPS code: 36-041-02572
- GNIS feature ID: 0978688
- Website: www.townofarietta.com

Arietta is a town in Hamilton County, New York, United States. The population was 292 at the 2020 census. The town was named after the mother of one of the first settlers, Rensselaer Van Rennslaer.

== History ==
The town was first settled around 1827 at Piseco Lake.

The town of Arietta was formed in 1836, from the town of Lake Pleasant. In 1837, part of Arietta was used to form part of the town of Long Lake. Another part of Arietta was added to Long Lake in 1861.

== Geography ==
According to the United States Census Bureau, the town of Arietta has a total area of 329.4 square miles (853 km^{2}), of which 317.6 square miles (823 km^{2}) are land and 11.8 square miles (31 km^{2}), or 3.59%, are water.

The town of Arietta is inside the Adirondack Park.

The southern town line is the border of Fulton County.

The East Canada Creek flows southward from the area around Powley to the Mohawk River. The West Branch of the Sacandaga River flows from Piseco Lake, via the Piseco Outlet, to the east.

New York State Route 8, an east-west highway, intersects New York State Route 10, a north-south highway, south of Piseco Lake.

=== Adjacent towns and areas ===
The western border of Arietta is the town of Morehouse. To the east are the towns of Lake Pleasant, Wells, and Benson. The town of Long Lake is at the northern boundary. The southern border is formed by the towns of Stratford and Caroga in Fulton County.

== Demographics ==
Historical population
Census	Pop.	Note	%±
1840	209		—
1850	108		−48.3%
1860	98		−9.3%
1870	139		41.8%
1880	294		111.5%
1890	357		21.4%
1900	247		−30.8%
1910	232		−6.1%
1920	176		−24.1%
1930	165		−6.2%
1940	183		10.9%
1950	219		19.7%
1960	235		7.3%
1970	350		48.9%
1980	314		−10.3%
1990	300		−4.5%
2000	293		−2.3%
2010	304		3.8%
2020	292		−3.9%
U.S. Decennial Census

As of the census of 2000, there were 293 people, 126 households, and 86 families residing in the town. The population density was 0.9 inhabitants per square mile (0.35/km^{2}). There were 788 housing units at an average density of 2.5 per square mile (0.97/km^{2}). The racial makeup of the town was 100.00% White.

There were 126 households, out of which 23.8% had children under the age of 18 living with them, 54.8% were married couples living together, 10.3% had a female householder with no husband present, and 31.0% were non-families. 28.6% of all households were made up of individuals, and 15.1% had someone living alone who was 65 years of age or older. The average household size was 2.33 and the average family size was 2.82.

In the town, the population was spread out, with 21.5% under the age of 18, 6.8% from 18 to 24, 22.5% from 25 to 44, 30.7% from 45 to 64, and 18.4% who were 65 years of age or older. The median age was 44 years. For every 100 females, there were 99.3 males. For every 100 females age 18 and over, there were 91.7 males.

The median income for a household in the town was $36,375, and the median income for a family was $42,917. Males had a median income of $29,286 versus $22,417 for females. The per capita income for the town was $25,378. None of the families and 2.8% of the population were living below the poverty line.

== Communities and locations in Arietta ==
=== Inhabited locations ===
- Arietta – The hamlet of Arietta is located on NY-10 in the southern part of the town.
- Avery's Place (or Avery Place) – A hamlet on NY-10 north of Arietta and south of Higgins Bay.
- Clockmill Corners – A location by the western town line, on Powley Road.
- Higgins Bay – This hamlet is on the southern shore of Piseco Lake on NY-8. The community is located on a small bay in the lake, also called Higgins Bay. It is north of the junction of Routes NY-8 and NY-10.
- Kenwells – A location on the western town line in the northern part of the town.
- Piseco – A hamlet located by Piseco Lake, which was originally proposed as the county seat.
- Piseco Airport (K09) – A small general aviation airport north of Piseco.
- Powley Place – A deserted hamlet by the western town line, on Powley Road.
- Rudestone – A hamlet on Old Piseco Road between Piseco Lake and Oxbow Lake.
- Shaker Place – A location west of NY-10 and south of Higgins Bay.

=== Geographical features ===
- Brown Lake – A small lake located east of Arietta.
- Cedar Lake – A lake located northwest of Sled Harbor.
- Fall Lake – A lake located north of Piseco.
- Ferris Lake – A lake east of Powleys Place.
- G Lake – A lake located west of Higgins Bay.
- Iron Lake – A lake located east of Powley Place.
- Jockeybush Lake – A lake located east of Powley Place.
- Little Moose Pond – A lake located north of Piseco.
- Lower Sargent Pond – A lake located east of Raquette Lake.
- Mud Lake – A lake located east of West Lake.
- Otter Lake – A small lake located northwest of Piseco.
- Oxbow Lake – A small lake northeast of Piseco Lake, partly in the Town of Lake Pleasant.
- Pillsbury Lake – A lake located northwest of Sled Harbor.
- Pillsbury Mountain – An elevation located north of the hamlet of Piseco.
- Piseco Lake – A large lake west of NY-8.
- Piseco Outlet – The stream which flows from the southern end of Piseco Lake to the West Branch of the Sacandaga River.
- Rock Lake – A lake located southeast of Clockmill Corners.
- Sampson Lake – A lake located south of Cedar Lake.
- South Lake – A lake located southwest of Cedar Lake.
- Spruce Lake – A lake located northwest of Piseco.
- T Lake Mountain – An elevation located northwest of the hamlet of Higgins Bay.
- Tomany Mountain – An elevation located northwest of the hamlet of Arietta.
- Trout Lake – A lake located south of Avery Place.
- Upper Sargent Pond – A lake located east of Raquette Lake.
- Whitney Lake – A lake located south of Cedar Lake.
