= Brown Lake =

Brown Lake or Lake Brown may refer to:

== Australia ==
- Brown Lake (Stradbroke Island), a lake in Queensland
- Brown Lake (Western Australia), a lake in Western Australia
- Lake Brown (Western Australia), two lakes of the same name in Western Australia
- Lake Brown, Western Australia, rural locality in the Wheatbelt region of Western Australia

== Canada ==
- Ellen Brown Lake, a lake in Pictou County, Nova Scotia
- John Brown Lake, a lake on Vancouver Island, British Columbia

== United States ==
- Brown Lake (Pulaski County, Arkansas), a lake in Pulaski County, Arkansas
- Brown Lake (Saline County, Arkansas), a lake in Saline County, Arkansas
- Lake Brown (Fulton County, Arkansas), a lake in Fulton County, Arkansas
- Lake Brown (Grant County, Arkansas), a lake in Grant County, Arkansas
- Brown State Fishing Lake, a protected area in Brown County, Kansas
- Brown Lake (New York), a lake in Hamilton County
- Lake Brown (South Carolina), officially Edgar Brown Lake
- Brown Lake, Washington, an unincorporated community

== See also ==
- Browne Lake (disambiguation)
- Browns Lake (disambiguation)
