= Browne Lake =

Browne Lake may refer to:

- Browne Lake, a reservoir in Chambers County, Alabama, United States
- Browne Lake, a reservoir in Gwinnett County, Georgia, United States
- Browne Lake (Utah), a reservoir in Daggett County, Utah, United States
- Browne Lake Provincial Park, a park in British Columbia, Canada
- Brownes Lake, a reservoir in Beaverhead County, Montana, United States

== See also ==
- Brown Lake
- Browns Lake
