= Fall Stream =

Location
- Country: United States
- State: New York

Physical characteristics
- Source
  - location: Hamilton County, New York
- Mouth: Piseco Lake
  - location: Piseco, Hamilton County, New York, United States
  - coordinates: 43°26′30″N 74°31′22″W

Fall Stream empties into Piseco Lake by Piseco, New York. Fall Stream flows through Fall Lake.
