= High Ledges Wildlife Sanctuary =

Protected Landscape in Massachusetts

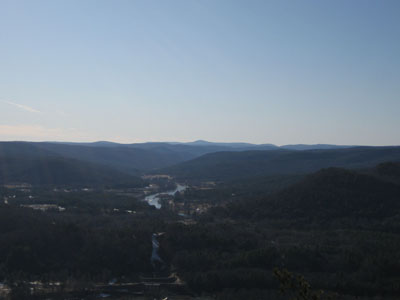
- The view from High Ledge
- Interactive map of High Ledges Wildlife Sanctuary
- Type: Wildlife sanctuary, nature center
- Location: Patten Road; Shelburne, Massachusetts, U.S.
- Coordinates: 42°37′13″N 72°42′20″W
- Area: 587 acres (238 ha)
- Created: 1970
- Operator: Massachusetts Audubon Society
- Hiking trails: 5 miles
- Website: High Ledges Wildlife Sanctuary

High Ledges is a wildlife sanctuary located in Shelburne, Massachusetts. The 587-acre (2.38 km^{2}) property, located on the northern portion of Massaemett Mountain, is owned by Massachusetts Audubon Society.

One of the highlights of the sanctuary is the vista known as High Ledge. The cliff overlooks Shelburne Falls and areas to the west, including Mount Greylock. The sanctuary's wildflower blooms include the Yellow lady's slipper.
