= Joseph Earl Perry =

Massachusetts politician (1884–1983)

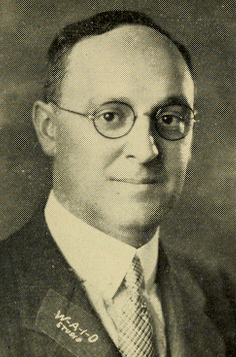

Member of the Massachusetts House of Representatives from the 27th Middlesex district
- In office 1925–1930

Personal details
- Born: December 30, 1884 Shelburne Falls, Massachusetts, US
- Died: November 3, 1983 (aged 98) Shelburne Falls, Massachusetts, US
- Education: Williams College (BA); Harvard Law School (LLB); Boston University (BBA)

Joseph Earl Perry (December 30, 1884 – November 3, 1983) was an American politician who was the member of the Massachusetts House of Representatives from the 27th Middlesex district.
