= Higgins Bay, New York =

- Hamlet
- Location within New York Location within the United States
- Coordinates: 43°24′28″N 74°32′02″W
- Country: United States
- State: New York
- County: Hamilton
- Town: Arietta
- Elevation: 1,683 ft (513 m)
- Time zone: UTC-5 (Eastern (EST))
  - Summer (DST): UTC-4 (EDT)
- Area code: 518

Higgins Bay, formally called Lower Rudeston, is a hamlet located in the Town of Arietta in Hamilton County, New York, United States. Higgins Bay is located on the southern shore of Piseco Lake, located on a small bay in the lake, also called Higgins Bay. It is on NY-8, north of the junction of Routes NY-8 and NY-10.
