= Pillsbury Mountain Forest Fire Observation Station =

- U.S. National Register of Historic Places
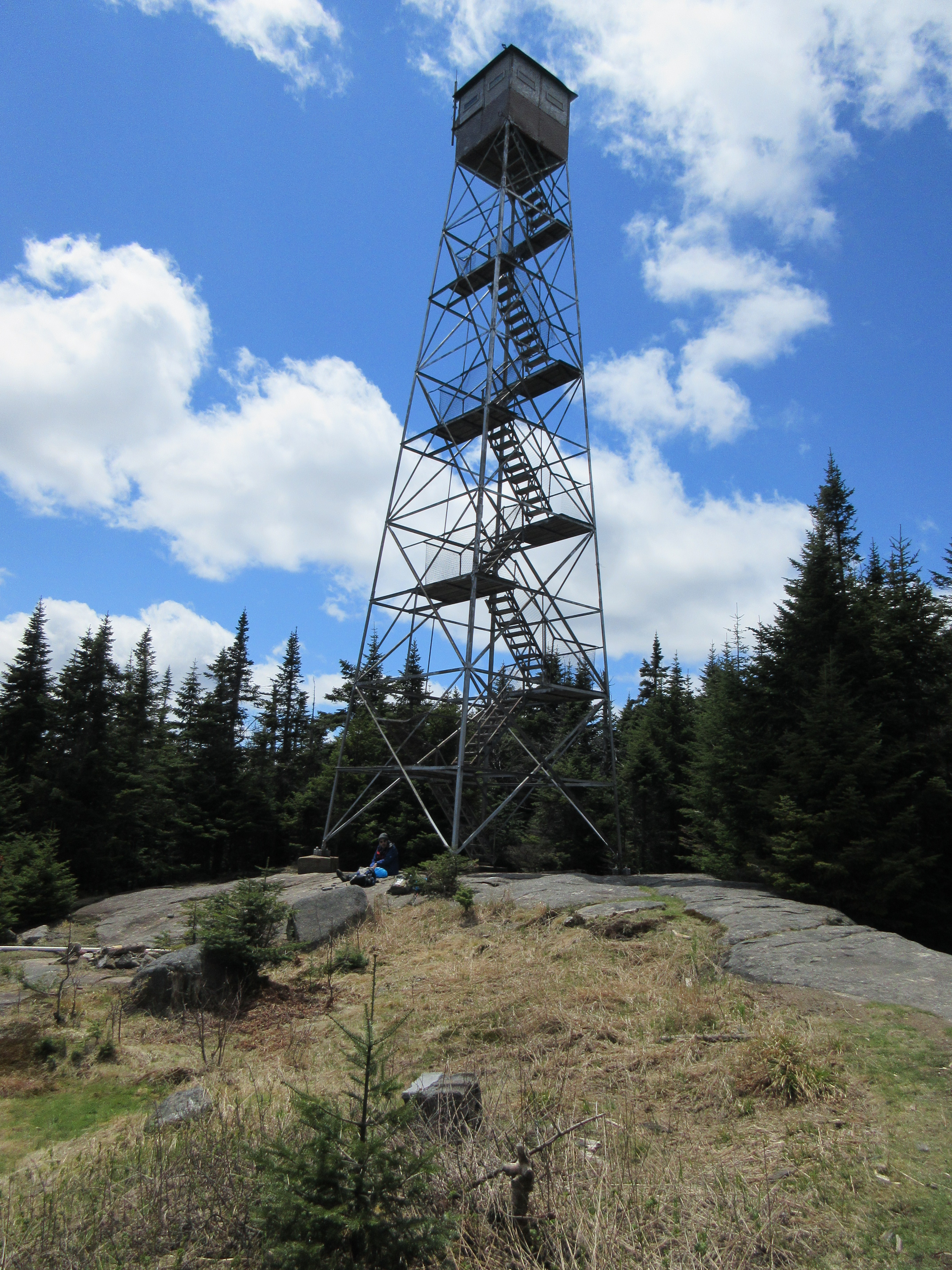

- Location within New York Location within the United States
- Location: Pillsbury Mountain, Arietta, New York
- Coordinates: 43°34′51″N 74°30′41″W
- Area: 5.87 acres (2.38 ha)
- Built: 1924, 1950
- Architect: AerMotor Company
- MPS: Fire Observation Stations of New York State Forest Preserve MPS
- NRHP reference No.: 10000728
- Added to NRHP: September 9, 2010

The Pillsbury Mountain Forest Fire Observation Station is a historic fire observation station located on Pillsbury Mountain summit at Arietta in Hamilton County, New York. The tower was built in 1924 by the Aermotor Windmill Company and the associated observer's cabin and shed in 1950. The lookout tower measures 69 feet tall.

It was added to the National Register of Historic Places in 2010.
