= Trout Lake (Arietta, Hamilton County, New York) =

Lake in New York state

- Location of mouth within New York Trout Lake (the United States)
- Location: Hamilton County, New York, United States
- Coordinates: 43°16′37″N 74°32′31″W
- Type: Lake
- Primary outflows: West Branch Sacandaga River
- Basin countries: United States
- Surface area: 20 acres (0.081 km^{2})
- Average depth: 8 feet (2.4 m)
- Max. depth: 14 feet (4.3 m)
- Shore length^{1}: .7 miles (1.1 km)
- Surface elevation: 1,637 feet (499 m)
- Settlements: Averys Place, New York
- ^{1} Shore length is not a well-defined measure.

Trout Lake is located south of Averys Place, New York. Fish species present in the lake are pickerel, white sucker, yellow perch, and brown bullhead. There is access by trail from County Route 10. No motors are allowed on the lake.
