= Little Moose Pond =

- Location within New York Little Moose Pond (the United States)
- Location: Hamilton County, New York
- Coordinates: 43°33′13″N 74°32′32″W
- Type: Lake
- Basin countries: United States
- Surface area: 28 acres (0.11 km^{2})
- Max. depth: 16 feet (4.9 m)
- Shore length^{1}: 1.2 miles (1.9 km)
- Surface elevation: 2,274 feet (693 m)
- Settlements: Piseco, New York
- ^{1} Shore length is not a well-defined measure.

Little Moose Pond is a lake located north of Piseco, New York. Fish species present in the lake are brook trout, and white sucker. There is trail access off the road on the east shore. No motors are allowed on this lake.
