= Browns Lake =

Browns Lake or Brown's Lake may refer to:

== United States ==
- Browns Lake in Faulkner County, Arkansas
- Browns Lake in Miller County, Arkansas
- Browns Lake (Idaho), a glacial lake in Elmore County, Idaho
- Browns Lake, a lake in Scott County, Minnesota
- Browns Lake (Washington), a lake in Washington
- Browns Lake, Wisconsin, a census-designated place in Racine County, Wisconsin

== Other places ==
- Brownes Lake / Kroweratwari, also spelt Browns Lake, part of the Mount Gambier (volcano) complex, South Australia

== See also ==
- Brown's Lake Bog, a nature preserve in Wayne County, Ohio
- Brown Lake (disambiguation)
