= Piseco Airport =

- IATA: none; ICAO: none; FAA LID: K09

Summary
- Airport type: Public
- Owner: Town of Arietta
- Location: Piseco, New York
- Elevation AMSL: 1,703 ft (519 m)
- Coordinates: 43°27′12″N 074°30′53″W

Map
- Location within New York Adirondack Park

Runways
Direction	Length		Surface
Direction	ft	m	Surface
4/22	3,015	919	Asphalt

Helipads
Number	Length		Surface
Number	ft	m	Surface
H1	40	12	Asphalt

Statistics (2009)
- Aircraft operations: 3,150
- Source: Federal Aviation Administration

Piseco Airport (FAA LID: K09) is a public-use airport one nautical mile (1.85 km) north of the central business district of Piseco, a hamlet in the Town of Arietta, Hamilton County, New York, United States. The airport is owned by the Town of Arietta. It is categorized as a general aviation facility in the FAA's National Plan of Integrated Airport Systems for 2009–2013.

== Facilities and aircraft ==
Piseco Airport covers 60 acres (24 ha) at an elevation of 1,703 feet (519 m) above mean sea level. It has one runway designated 4/22 with an asphalt surface measuring 3,015 by 60 feet (919 x 18 m). It also has one helipad designated H1 which measures 40 by 40 feet (12 x 12 m). For the 12-month period ending September 25, 2009, the airport had 3,150 aircraft operations, an average of 262 per month: 97% general aviation and 3% military.

== See also ==
- List of airports in New York
