= West Branch Sacandaga River =

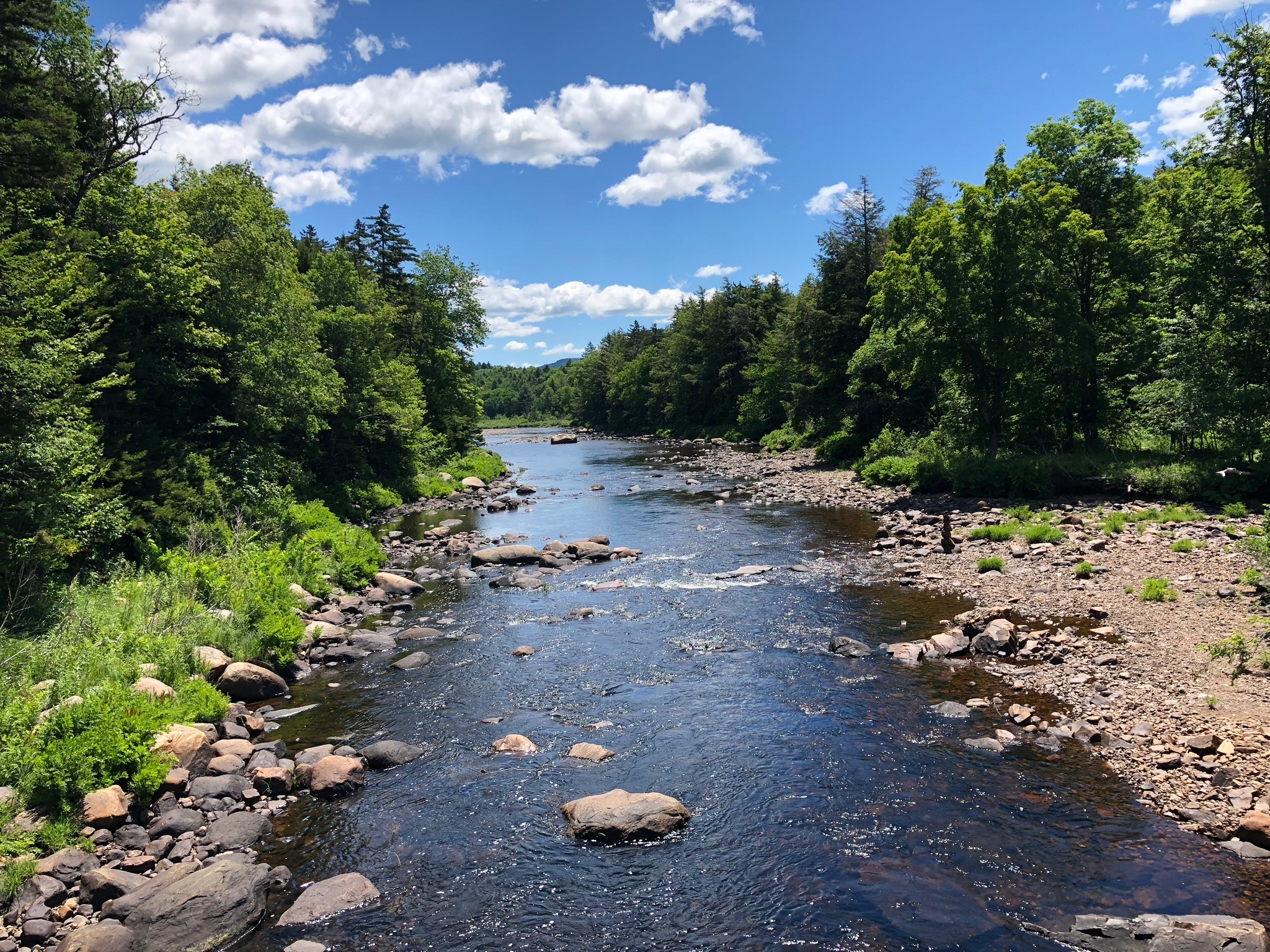
- The West Branch of the Sacandaga River flowing through the Adirondack Mountains in Wells, New York.

Location
- Country: United States
- State: New York
- Region: Adirondacks
- County: Hamilton

Physical characteristics
- Source
  - location: Northwest of Benson
  - coordinates: 43°17′35″N 74°23′08″W
- Mouth: Sacandaga River
  - location: South of Wells
  - coordinates: 43°21′30″N 74°17′27″W
  - elevation: 955 ft (291 m)
- Basin size: 158.3 sq mi (410 km^{2})

Basin features
- Tributaries
  - left: Piseco Outlet
  - right: Chub Lake, Trout Lake

West Branch Sacandaga River is a river in Hamilton County in the state of New York. It begins northwest of Benson and flows west then northward then eastward before converging with the Sacandaga River south of Wells.

== Recreation ==
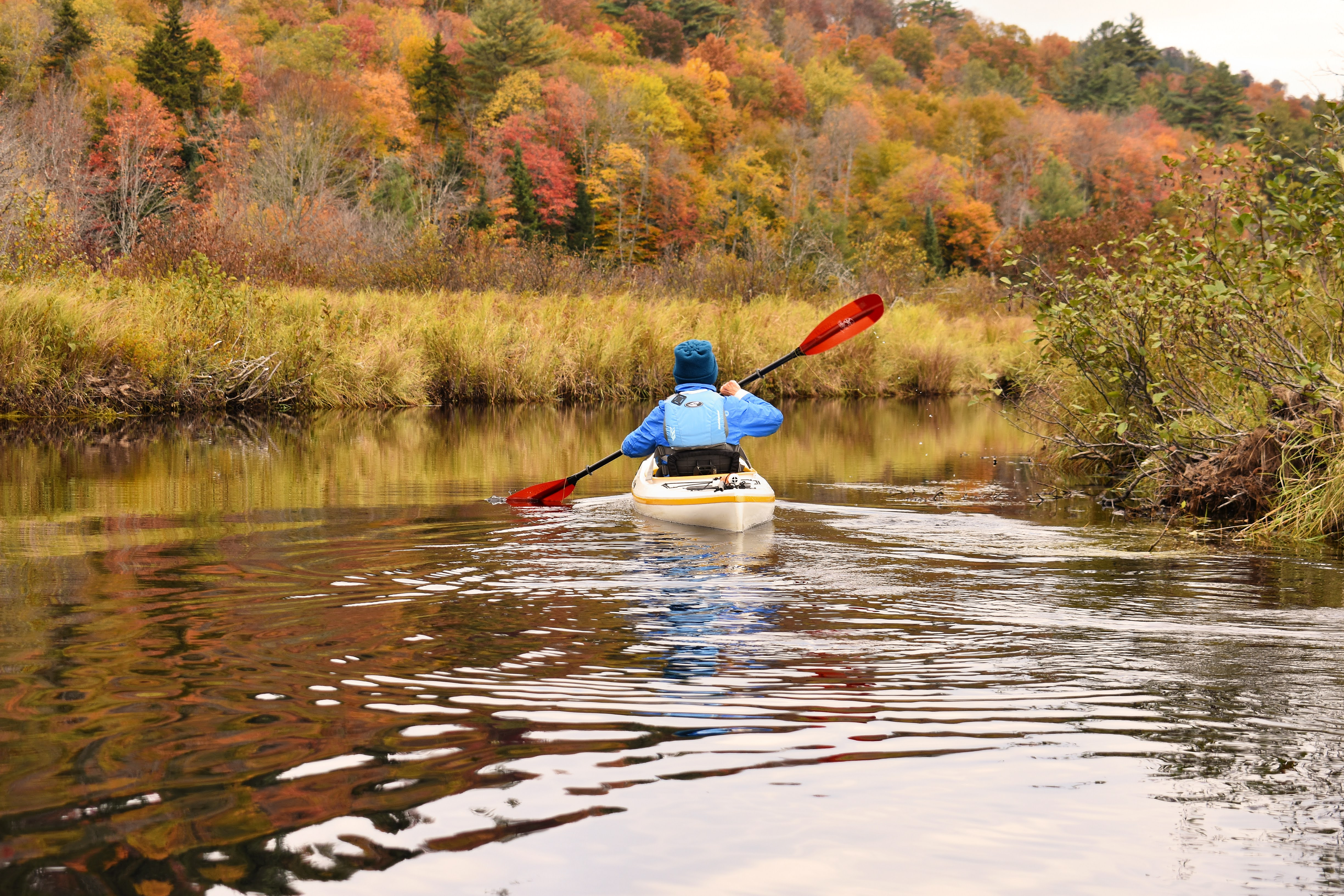
A kayaker during fall foliage on the W. Branch of the Sacandaga River, Adirondack Mountains, New York State.

In May 2021, the New York State Department of Environmental Conservation stocked 133 12-to-15-inch-long (30 to 38 cm) brown trout and 1200 12-to-15-inch-long (30 to 38 cm) rainbow trout into the river in the town of Wells.

== Tributaries ==
Right

Silver Lake Outlet
North Branch
Chub Lake
Trout Lake
Cow Creek
Moose Creek
Ninemile Creek
Devorse Creek
Vly Creek

Left

Whitman Flow
Good Luck Lake
State Brook
Shanty Brook
Teeter Creek
Piseco Outlet
Cold Brook
Hamilton Lake Stream
Dugway Creek
Jimmy Creek
