= Tomany Mountain =

Mountain in New York, United States

- Location within New York Adirondack Park Location within the United States

Highest point
- Elevation: 2,589 feet (789 m)
- Coordinates: 43°16′58″N 74°34′24″W

Geography
- Location: Hamilton County, New York, U.S.
- Topo map: USGS Tomany Mountain

Tomany Mountain is a 2,589-foot-tall (789 m) mountain in the Adirondack Mountains region of New York. It is located northwest of Arietta in Hamilton County. In 1912, the Conservation Commission built a wooden fire observation tower on the mountain. In 1916, wooden tower was replaced with a 50-foot-tall (15 m) Aermotor LL25 tower. The tower was closed at the end of the 1970 fire watching season, and later dismantled.

== History ==
In 1912, the Conservation Commission (CC) built a wooden fire observation tower on the mountain. In 1916, the CC replaced it with a 50-foot-tall (15 m) Aermotor LL25 tower. It was of a lighter weight than the 1917 design and had no stairs but only a ladder. Wooden steps were added within the structure in 1918 or 1919. Aermotor designed a self-supporting staircase for the tower purchased in 1916. This self supporting staircase was purchased and added to the tower in 1929. With the advent of fire detection by aircraft, this tower was closed at the end of the 1970 fire watching season. The tower was later dismantled and the pieces left scattered near the summit.

== Route ==
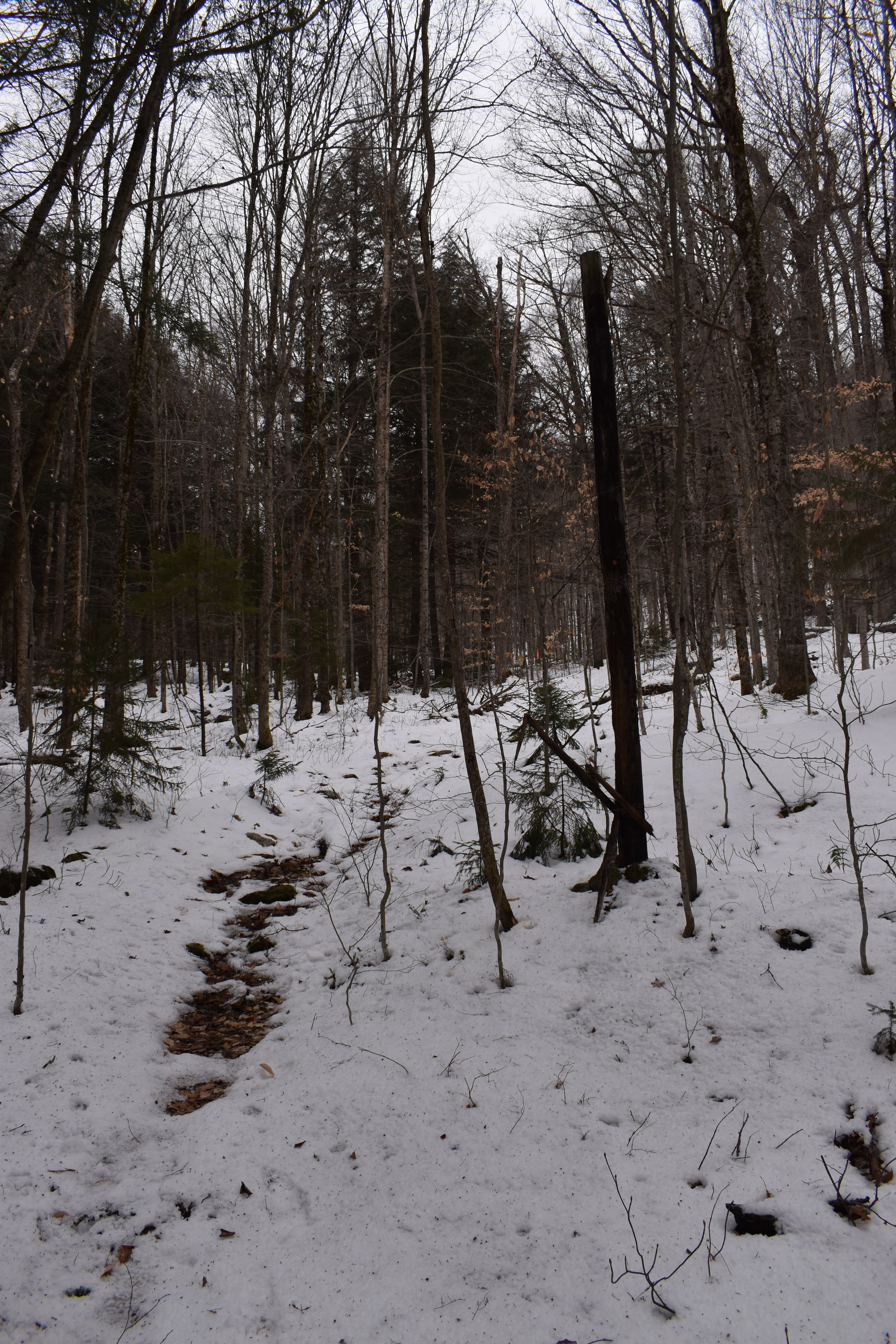
Trail to summit with old telephone line pole visible

The summit can be accessed via a foot trails that runs from New York State Route 10. The trail is a 1.9-mile-long (3.1 km) mile hike that climbs about 1,150 feet (350 m) to the top of the mountain. The trail is not maintained, but is still marked with old New York State Department of Environmental Conservation trail markers. The trail follows the telephone poles that provided communication to the observer.
