= Otter Lake (Arietta, Hamilton County, New York) =

- Location within New York Otter Lake (the United States)
- Location: Hamilton County, New York, United States
- Coordinates: 43°32′44″N 74°33′48″W
- Type: Lake
- Primary outflows: Otter Lake Outlet
- Basin countries: United States
- Surface area: 26 acres (0.11 km^{2})
- Max. depth: 26 feet (7.9 m)
- Shore length^{1}: .9 miles (1.4 km)
- Surface elevation: 2,260 feet (690 m)
- Settlements: Piseco, New York
- ^{1} Shore length is not a well-defined measure.

Otter Lake is located northwest of Piseco, New York. Fish species present in the lake are brook trout, and white sucker. There is trail access off the east shore. No motors are allowed on this lake.
