= Silas Lamson =

American inventor and eccentric (1778–1855)

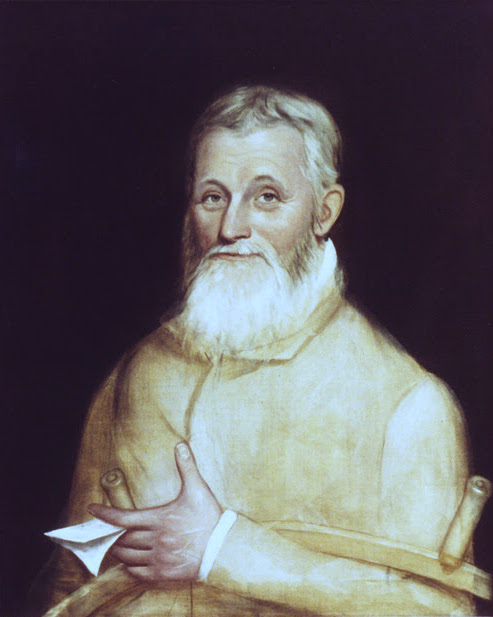
Silas Lamson holding a curved scythe snath, painting by Joseph Goodhue Chandler

Silas Lamson (1778–1855) was a 19th-century American inventor and manufacturer of scythe handles, agricultural implements, knives and cutlery. The business he started in 1837, Lamson & Goodnow, became one of the largest cutlery companies in the United States, and still exists as Lamson, located in Westfield, Massachusetts. Late in life his behavior became eccentric. He would appear at abolitionist meetings and religious reform meetings in a long white beard and white robe, carrying a large scythe. Descriptions referred to him as 'Father Lamson.'

== Business career ==
In 1834, Lamson patented a method for manufacturing curved snath handles for scythes used to harvest hay and wheat. The downward curve of the handle was an ergonomic improvement over straight-handled scythes. Three years later he partnered with two of his sons and with Abel Goodnow to found Lamson & Goodnow, a knife manufacturing company, in Shelburne Falls, Massachusetts. By the time of the Civil War, the company employed more than 500 workers. The company exists in the 21st century as Lamson.

== Eccentric behavior ==
Late in his life:

...he became passionate to communicate his "firmness of purpose to unveil and ridicule all that he deemed ridiculous in law, custom and religion", preaching his beliefs wherever he could... Silas did not approve of government oversight and as such he was routinely placed in jail for failing to pay his tithes, and finally, due to his constant preaching, was condemned to the Worchester [sic] and Brattleboro asylums "to be treated for insanity and uncustomary methods of dispensing his sentiments" for a period of six years.

One account reads:

When Father Lamson appeared in a reform convention, it was a serious matter. He was serenely proof against all blandishments and threats. In a world of free speech he meant to have his say, and at such length and in such phrase as the spirit might move, and the experienced knew what length and what phrase the spirit would move. It was generally necessary to remove Father Lamson. But who would bell the cat? He had great solemnity of visage and a long white beard, and when a pair of the young and stalwart brethren, an impromptu police, approached him to assist his orderly and peaceful departure, he lay down deliberately, and could be voided from the meeting only by being borne out at length. This was among the humors of anniversary week, although Father Lamson’s avatar was usually in Boston. How readily might the wicked reporter, to whom he was a boon, as he muses upon the storms and passions and humors and results of those old days, smile ruefully as he recalls that figure of old Father Time…
