= Ferris Lake =

- Location within New York Ferris Lake (the United States)
- Location: Hamilton County, New York, United States
- Coordinates: 43°18′25″N 74°37′52″W
- Type: Lake
- Basin countries: United States
- Surface area: 120 acres (0.49 km^{2})
- Average depth: 12 feet (3.7 m)
- Max. depth: 23 feet (7.0 m)
- Shore length^{1}: 3 miles (4.8 km)
- Surface elevation: 1,729 feet (527 m)
- Islands: 3
- Settlements: Powley Place, New York
- ^{1} Shore length is not a well-defined measure.

Ferris Lake is located east of Powley Place, New York. Fish species present in the lake are yellow perch, sunfish, and brown bullhead. There is a trail access from Powley Place via private lands and detouring off the trail or camping on the trail is not allowed.
