= Rock Lake (Arietta, Hamilton County, New York) =

- Location within New York Rock Lake (the United States)
- Location: Hamilton County, New York, United States
- Coordinates: 43°19′41″N 74°35′27″W
- Type: Lake
- Basin countries: United States
- Surface area: 29 acres (0.12 km^{2})
- Average depth: 5 feet (1.5 m)
- Max. depth: 21 feet (6.4 m)
- Shore length^{1}: .9 miles (1.4 km)
- Surface elevation: 1,814 feet (553 m)
- Settlements: Clockmill Corners, New York
- ^{1} Shore length is not a well-defined measure.

Rock Lake is located southeast of Clockmill Corners, New York. Fish species present in the lake are brown bullhead, chain pickerel, brook trout, and sunfish large mouth bass yellow perch northern pike. There is trail access off Powley-Piseco Road along the west shore.

Overview of Rock Lake: Rock Lake is a widened portion of the Rock River. Rock River can be dangerous however, with shallow waters and many rapids. On the west side of the lake there lie wetlands and bird viewing opportunities. On the eastern side are sand beaches and waters for swimming.

Directions to Rock Lake: From the intersection of Route 30 and Route 28 in Indian Lake, follow Route 28 and 30 toward Blue Mountain Lake for 6.0 miles to the trail end at the right.

Type of water in Rock Lake: Rock lake is a large body of water that consists of shallow areas and rapid areas as well. It is not well-sheltered, but it remains calm year round.

Type of carry in Rock Lake: 0.85-mile carry over rough waters and a narrow trail. Would be best for a lightweight canoe or kayak that can be carried.

Rock Lake Trail Overview: This is a short trail that is regularly utilized by fishermen and those ready to make the short side trip to paddle a separated lake. The shoreline has birding openings. From the stopping territory, one climbs on a smooth trail. Johnny Mack Brook is on the right side through a blended woodland and a snowmobile trail intersects just short of the lake. Other approaches to the lake are available from the snowmobile trail.
