= Fall Lake (New York) =

- Location within New York Fall Lake (the United States)
- Location: Hamilton County, New York, United States
- Coordinates: 43°27′16″N 74°30′08″W
- Type: Lake
- Primary inflows: Fall Stream
- Primary outflows: Fall Stream
- Basin countries: United States
- Surface area: 24 acres (0.097 km^{2})
- Max. depth: 13 feet (4.0 m)
- Shore length^{1}: 0.9 miles (1.4 km)
- Surface elevation: 1,667 feet (508 m)
- Settlements: Piseco, New York, Rudeston, New York
- ^{1} Shore length is not a well-defined measure.

Fall Lake is located north of Piseco, New York. Fish species present in the lake are rock bass, white sucker, black bullhead, smallmouth bass, yellow perch, and pickerel. There is carry down access on Fall Stream off Old Piseco Road on land owned by the Irondequoit Club.
