= Piseco Outlet =

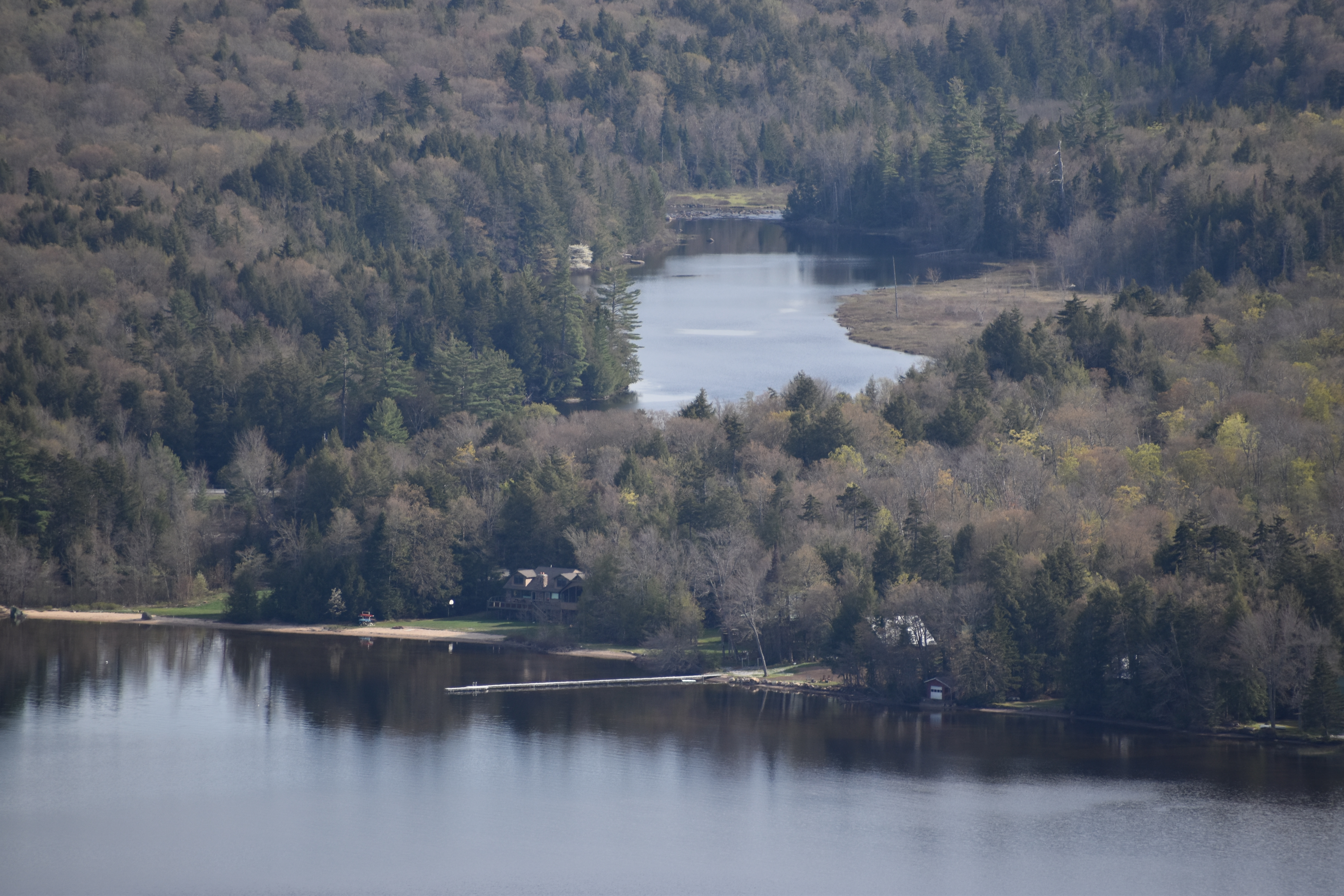
- Piseco Outlet from Echo Cliff in May 2021

- Location of the mouth of Piseco Outlet Piseco Outlet (the United States)

Location
- Country: United States
- State: New York
- Region: Adirondacks
- County: Hamilton

Physical characteristics
- Source: Piseco Lake
  - location: Piseco, New York
  - coordinates: 43°23′23″N 74°34′26″W
  - elevation: 1,660 ft (510 m)
- Mouth: West Branch Sacandaga River
  - location: Piseco, New York, United States
  - coordinates: 43°21′03″N 74°30′33″W
  - elevation: 1,611 ft (491 m)

Piseco Outlet drains Piseco Lake and converges with the West Branch Sacandaga River in Piseco, New York. From the outlet of Piseco Lake to the creeks mouth it only drops 49 ft (15 m) in elevation.
