= Massaemett Mountain =

Mountain in Massachusetts, United States of America

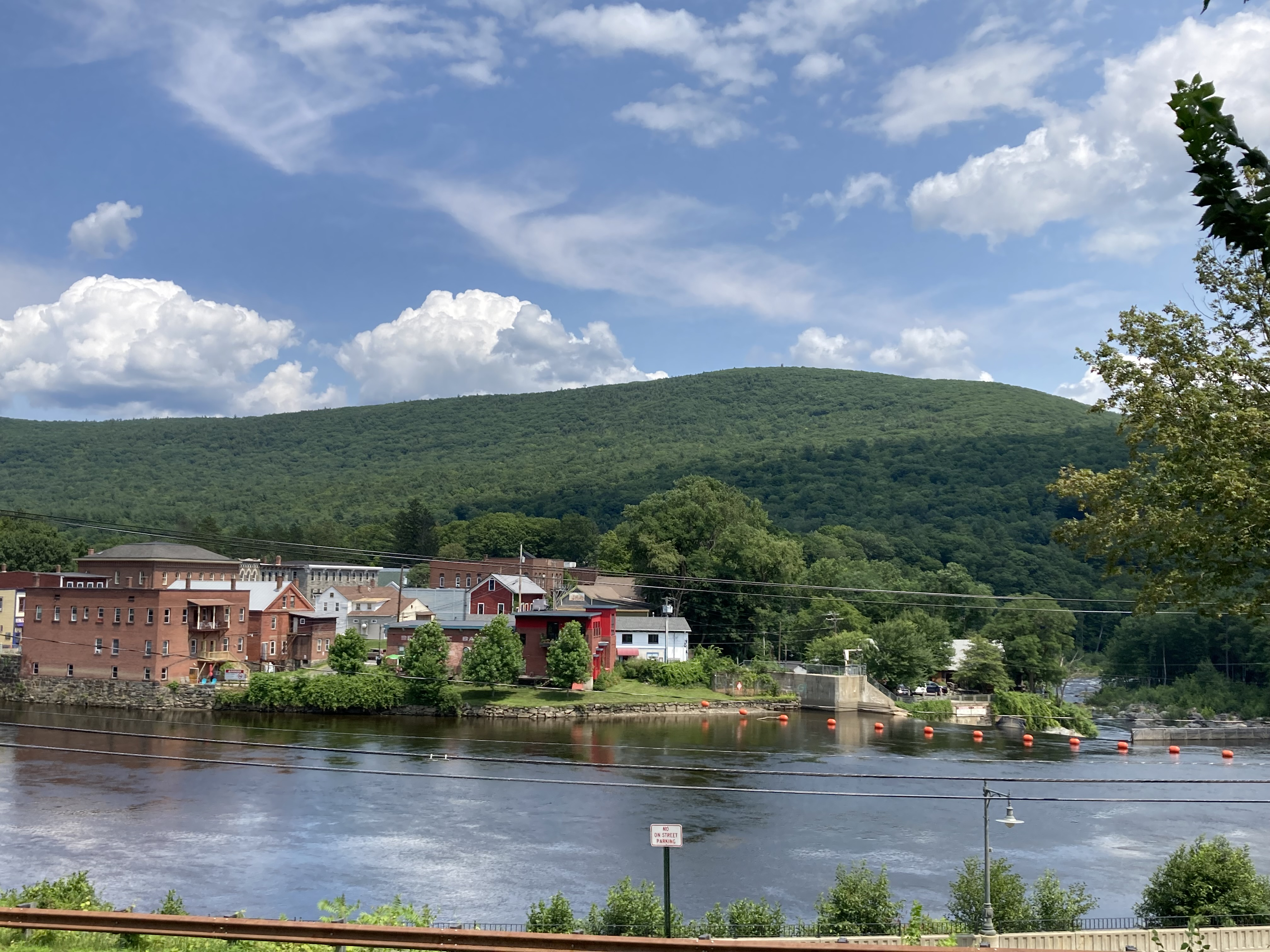
- Massaemett Mountain and the village of Shelburne Falls on the Deerfield River

Highest point
- Elevation: 1,594 ft (486 m)
- Prominence: 486 ft (148 m)
- Coordinates: 42°36′25″N 72°43′00″W

Geography
- Location within Massachusetts
- Location: Shelburne, Massachusetts, U.S.
- Parent range: Berkshire Mountains

Massaemett Mountain (sometimes known as Bald Mountain) is a mountain in Shelburne, Franklin County, Massachusetts, USA. It is named for a chief of the Pocumtuck tribe, a confederacy of Native Americans who inhabited the region. Part of the Berkshire Mountains, Massaemett lies just east of the village of Shelburne Falls, 7 miles (11 km) west of the county seat of Greenfield, Massachusetts, and 87 miles (140 km) west of Boston. The summit features a historic stone fire tower constructed in 1909. The top cab is not open to the public, however the stairway is kept open and offers views from multiple windows facing the four directions of the compass. From the tower, views include the Berkshires and Taconic Mountains to the west (including Mount Greylock), the Green Mountains of Vermont to the north, Mount Monadnock to the east, and the Holyoke Range to the south.

The High Ledges Wildlife Sanctuary is located on the northern portion of the mountain. Shelburne State Forest encompasses the peak of the mountain. There are two hiking trails which provide access to the summit.

== History ==
=== Native American History ===
The historic Mohawk Trail runs along the base of Massaemett Mountain. Originally a woodland path used by Native Americans for roughly 10,000 years to hunt, trade, and conduct war, the route connected the Connecticut River Valley to the Hudson River Valley. It is now a modern roadway constructed by the state beginning in 1914. Prior to and during the period of European contact, the region was inhabited primarily by the Pocumtuck tribe. At the foot of Massaemett Mountain on the Deerfield River, a cataract known as Salmon Falls (now Shelburne Falls) was an important fishing site used by numerous Native American tribes including the Mohawk, the Penobscot and the Pocumtuck. Chief Massaemett, after whom the mountain is named, was a leader of the Pocumtuck confederacy at the time of European contact in the late 17th century.

=== Shelburne Fire Tower ===
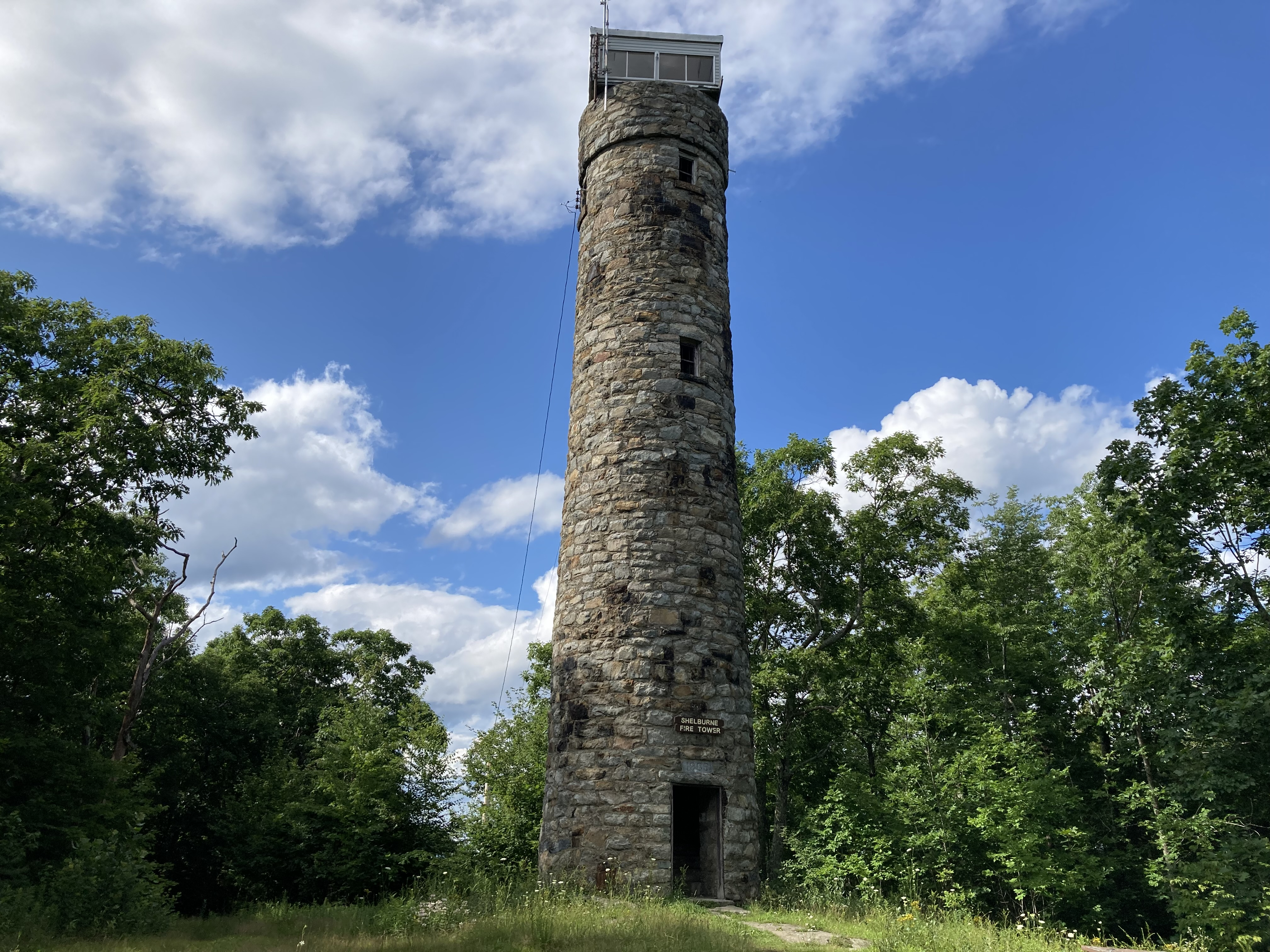
Shelburne Fire Tower

The stone observation tower atop Massaemett was constructed in 1909 through the efforts of a private group made up of prominent citizens of Shelburne Falls. There had been at least two prior observation towers on the site during the 19th century. One burned and another was destroyed during the infamous Portland Gale of 1898. It was agreed that the new tower should be more durable and made from stone and cement. The stone was quarried from the mountain itself. Funding was obtained primarily through entertainments staged in Shelburne Falls. The tower is 60 feet tall.

Although the tower was originally constructed for recreational purposes, in 1911 the Massachusetts fire warden's department began using it as a fire lookout tower to watch for forest fires. A formal agreement was signed with the original private owners in 1912 to allow this use and the state was given further permission to construct an enclosed stone and glass cab at the top of the tower. This original cab was destroyed in 1947 by a lightning strike and fire. It was replaced by the state in 1967 with the present wood and glass cab. The tower now belongs to the Commonwealth of Massachusetts and serves as an active fire tower operated by the Massachusetts Fire Marshal with the designation of Massachusetts State Tower #40. It is one of only two active stone fire towers in New England.

== Conservation ==
=== High Ledges Wildlife Sanctuary ===
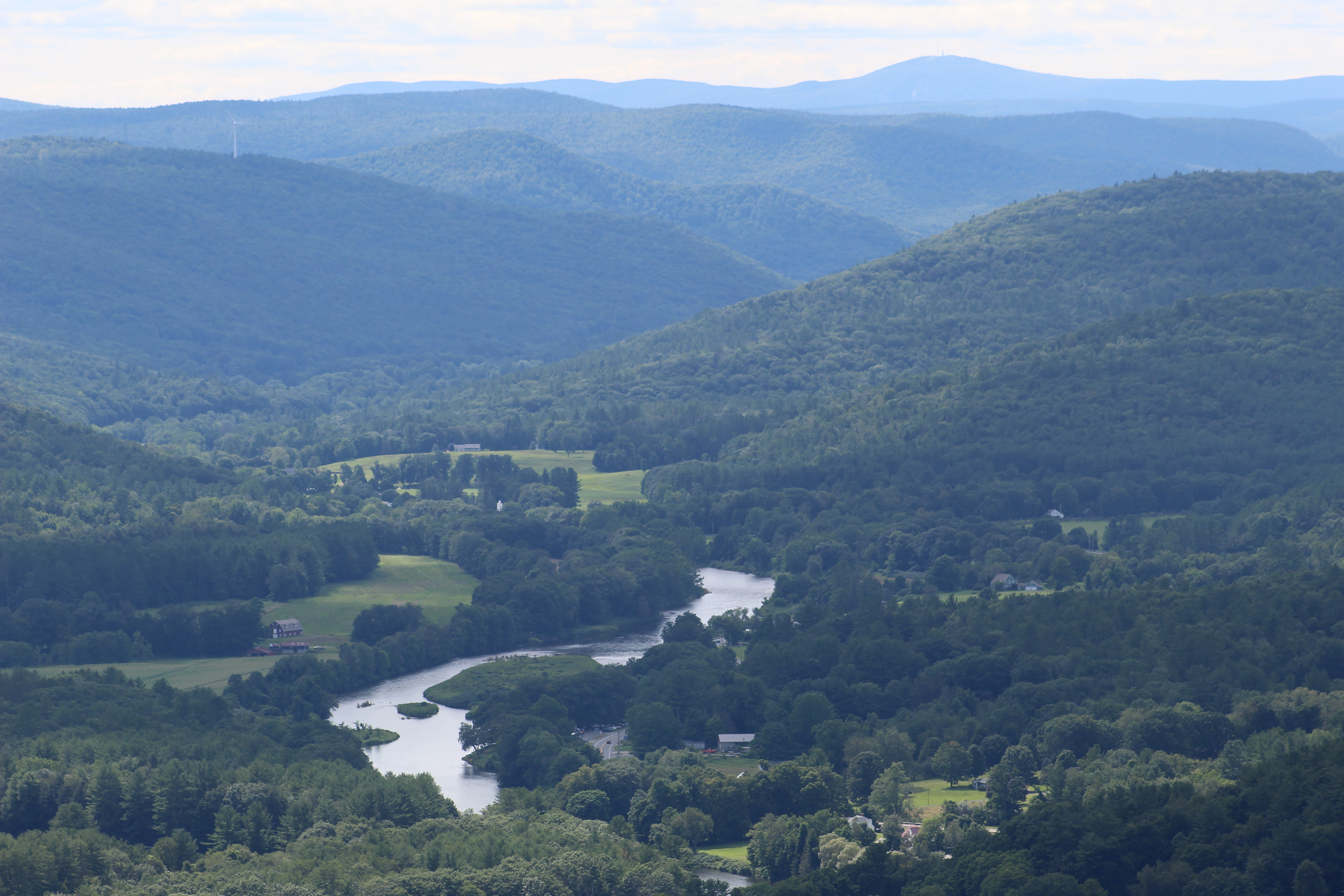
View of Deerfield River Valley and Mt. Greylock from High Ledges

In the 1970s, Dr. Ellsworth Barnard donated the original portion of the High Ledges Sanctuary, consisting of 400 acres (160 ha) on the north shoulder of Massaemett Mountain, to the Massachusetts Audubon Society. Barnard, a professor of English and avid naturalist, grew up in Shelburne Falls and taught English at the University of Massachusetts Amherst and Williams College. He acquired land on Massaemett and built a summer home atop a rocky outcropping known as High Ledges. The house has since burned but the chimney and foundation walls are still extant. The overlook at High Ledges offers a sweeping view of Shelburne Falls and the Berkshire Mountains and is a popular spot for tourists and hikers. Massachusetts Audubon has acquired additional abutting properties over the years and the sanctuary now consists of 746 acres (302 ha). There are 5 miles of maintained hiking trails through the sanctuary.

=== Shelburne State Forest ===
A parcel consisting of 49 acres (20 ha) at the summit of Massaemett Mountain is owned and maintained by the Massachusetts Department of Conservation and Recreation and makes up a portion of Shelburne State Forest. Another non-contiguous parcel is located along the Deerfield River.

== Trails ==
The summit of Massaemett can be accessed via two different hiking trails both of which are maintained by the Town of Shelburne. The Fire Tower Trail climbs 1.25 miles from Massachusetts Route 2 on the western side of the mountain to the stone tower at the summit. The trail is a steep hike from the foot of the mountain climbing approximately 1,000 feet (300 m) of elevation. The second trail, known as the Ridge Trail, approaches the summit from the north slope. It begins at the High Ledges Sanctuary and runs one mile, connecting to Shelburne State Forest and the peak of Massaemett.
