= T Lake Mountain =

Mountain in New York, United States

- Location within New York Adirondack Park Location within the United States

Highest point
- Elevation: 3,058 feet (932 m)
- Coordinates: 43°26′49″N 74°34′38″W

Geography
- Location: Hamilton County, New York, U.S.
- Topo map: USGS Piseco Lake

T Lake Mountain is a mountain in the Adirondack Mountains region of New York. It is located north-northwest of Witherbee in Hamilton County. In 1916, the Conservation Commission built a 50-foot-tall (15 m) Aermotor LL25 tower on the mountain. The T Lake Mountain Fire Observation Station ceased fire watching operations at the end of the 1970 season. In 1977, U.S. Army Engineers tested explosive charges on the fire tower which brought the tower crashing down. A few weeks later, the remains of the tower were removed by helicopter.

== History ==
In 1916, the Conservation Commission erected a 50-foot-tall (15 m) Aermotor LL25 tower on the mountain. The tower was of a lighter weight than the 1917 design and had no stairs but only a ladder up the exterior to get to the top. In 1918 or 1919, wooden steps were added within the structure to ease access to the top of the tower. The Aermotor company later developed a self-supporting staircase for installation in the towers purchased in 1916. This staircase was a tower within a tower and was anchored to the original tower. This self-supporting staircase was installed in 1931 to replace the wooden stairs that were previously installed. Due to aerial detection that was developed, the tower was closed at the end of the 1970 fire lookout season. The tower was deemed as not necessary to fire lookout purposes and also a "non-conforming" structure in the newly established West Canada Lakes Wilderness Area. Residents around Piseco Lake made several unsuccessful requests to the New York State Department of Environmental Conservation to keep the tower for air traffic control purposes at the Piseco Airport. In 1977, the United States Army Corps of Engineers were allowed to test shaped explosive charges on the fire tower which brought the tower crashing down. A few weeks later, the remains of the tower were removed by helicopter.
