= Jockeybush Lake =

- Location within New York Jockeybush Lake (the United States)
- Location: Hamilton County, New York, United States
- Coordinates: 43°18′12″N 74°35′38″W
- Type: Lake
- Basin countries: United States
- Surface area: 48 acres (0.19 km^{2})
- Average depth: 10 feet (3.0 m)
- Max. depth: 37 feet (11 m)
- Shore length^{1}: 1.7 miles (2.7 km)
- Surface elevation: 1,965 feet (599 m)
- Islands: 1
- Settlements: Powley Place, New York
- ^{1} Shore length is not a well-defined measure.

Jockeybush Lake is located east of Powley Place, New York. Fish species present in the lake are brook trout, and sunfish. There is trail access to the lake from CR-10.
