= Iron Lake (New York) =

- Location within New York Iron Lake (the United States)
- Location: Hamilton County, New York, United States
- Coordinates: 43°18′44″N 74°35′41″W
- Type: Lake
- Basin countries: United States
- Surface area: 22 acres (0.089 km^{2})
- Average depth: 10 feet (3.0 m)
- Max. depth: 36 feet (11 m)
- Shore length^{1}: 1.7 miles (2.7 km)
- Surface elevation: 1,998 feet (609 m)
- Islands: 2
- Settlements: Powley Place, New York
- ^{1} Shore length is not a well-defined measure.

Iron Lake is located east of Powley Place, New York. Fish species present in the lake are brook trout, and sunfish. There is trail access along the east shore.

== In media ==
Dexter: New Blood is set in a fictional upstate New York town named Iron Lake.
