= Shelburne Falls, Massachusetts =

- Census-designated place
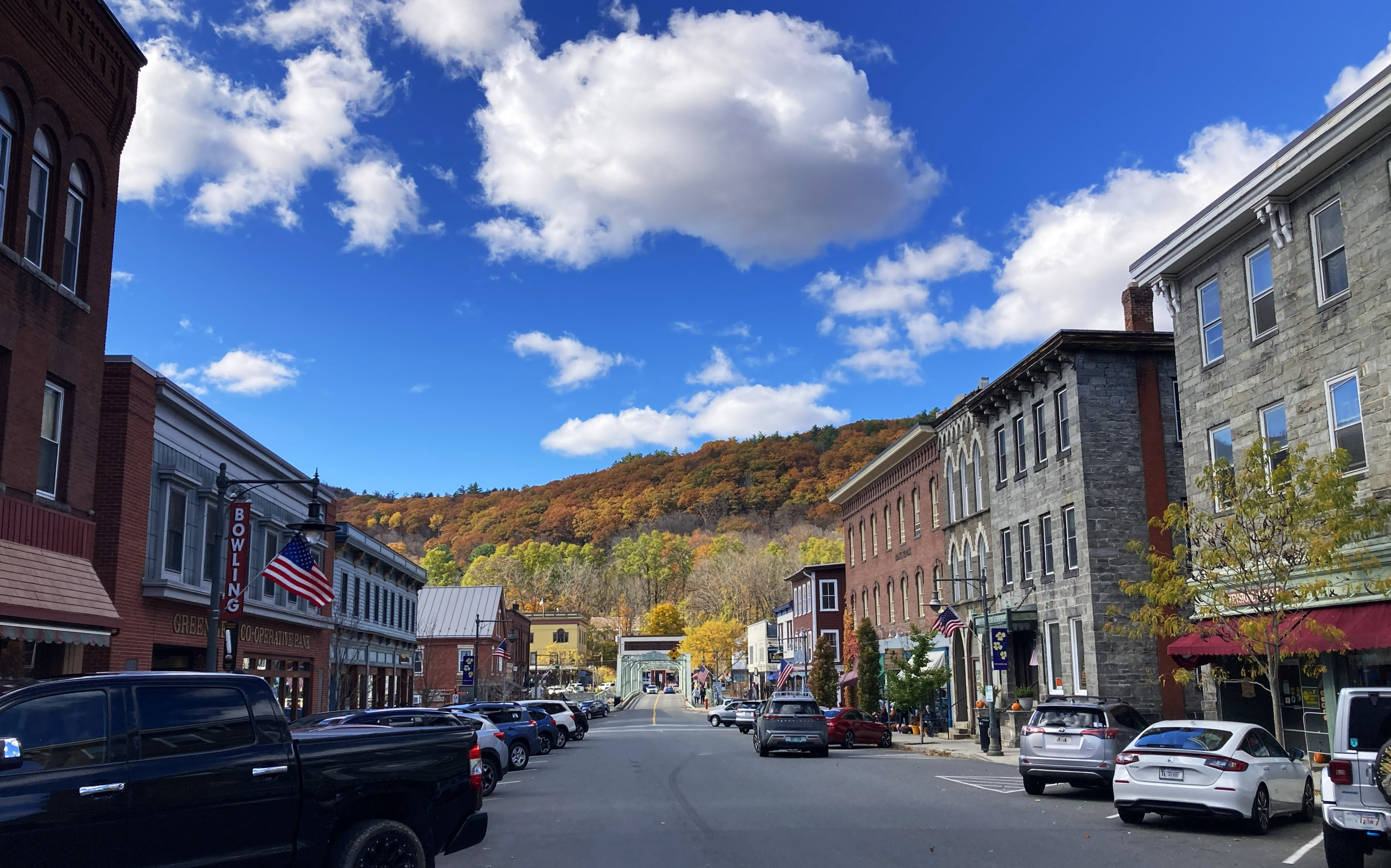
- Downtown Shelburne Falls

- Location in Franklin County in Massachusetts
- Coordinates: 42°36′19″N 72°44′18″W
- Country: United States
- State: Massachusetts
- County: Franklin
- Towns: Shelburne, Buckland

Area
  - Total: 2.71 sq mi (7.03 km^{2})
  - Land: 2.63 sq mi (6.81 km^{2})
  - Water: 0.085 sq mi (0.22 km^{2})
- Elevation: 417 ft (127 m)

Population (2020)
  - Total: 1,719
  - Density: 653.8/sq mi (252.45/km^{2})
- Time zone: UTC−5 (Eastern (EST))
  - Summer (DST): UTC−4 (EDT)
- ZIP Code: 01370
- Area code: 413
- FIPS code: 25-61205
- GNIS feature ID: 0608657

Shelburne Falls is a historic village in the towns of Shelburne and Buckland in Franklin County, Massachusetts, United States. The village is a census-designated place (CDP); as of the 2020 census, Shelburne Falls had a population of 1,719. It is part of the Springfield, Massachusetts, Metropolitan Statistical Area.

== History ==
Silas Lamson was a 19th-century American inventor and manufacturer of scythe handles, agricultural implements, knives and cutlery. In 1834, Lamson patented a method for manufacturing curved snath handles for scythes used to harvest hay and wheat. The downward curve of the handle was an ergonomic improvement over straight-handled scythes. Three years later he partnered with two of his sons and with Abel Goodnow to found Lamson & Goodnow, a knife manufacturing company, in Shelburne Falls. By the time of the Civil War, the company employed more than 500 workers, making it one of the largest cutlery companies in the United States. The company exists in the 21st century as Lamson, with an outlet store in Shelburne Falls.

== Geography ==
The Deerfield River bisects Shelburne Falls, and Massaemett Mountain rises east of the village.

According to the United States Census Bureau, the CDP has a total area of 6.8 km^{2} (2.6 mi^{2}), of which 6.6 km^{2} (2.5 mi^{2}) is land and 0.3 km^{2} (0.1 mi^{2}) (3.79%) is water. Shelburne Falls is served by Massachusetts Route 2, also known as the Mohawk Trail, as well as Routes 2A and 112, the former being the main route through the village.

== Demographics ==
Historical population
| Census | Pop. | Note | %± |
|---|---|---|---|
| 2020 | 1,719 | | — |
U.S. Decennial Census

=== 2020 census ===
As of the 2020 census, Shelburne Falls had a population of 1,719. The median age was 53.1 years. 13.6% of residents were under the age of 18 and 30.4% of residents were 65 years of age or older. For every 100 females there were 80.0 males, and for every 100 females age 18 and over there were 78.3 males.

0.0% of residents lived in urban areas, while 100.0% lived in rural areas.

There were 911 households in Shelburne Falls, of which 19.2% had children under the age of 18 living in them. Of all households, 33.9% were married-couple households, 18.9% were households with a male householder and no spouse or partner present, and 38.6% were households with a female householder and no spouse or partner present. About 43.2% of all households were made up of individuals and 23.5% had someone living alone who was 65 years of age or older.

There were 985 housing units, of which 7.5% were vacant. The homeowner vacancy rate was 2.2% and the rental vacancy rate was 1.4%.

Racial composition as of the 2020 census
| Race | Number | Percent |
|---|---|---|
| White | 1,582 | 92.0% |
| Black or African American | 13 | 0.8% |
| American Indian and Alaska Native | 1 | 0.1% |
| Asian | 10 | 0.6% |
| Native Hawaiian and Other Pacific Islander | 0 | 0.0% |
| Some other race | 7 | 0.4% |
| Two or more races | 106 | 6.2% |
| Hispanic or Latino (of any race) | 51 | 3.0% |

=== 2000 census ===
As of the 2000 census, there were 1,951 people, 815 households, and 466 families residing in the CDP. The population density was 296.6/km^{2} (768.3/mi^{2}). There were 878 housing units at an average density of 133.5/km^{2} (345.8/mi^{2}). The racial makeup of the CDP was 96.92% White, 0.26% African American, 0.67% Native American, 0.67% Asian, 0.05% Pacific Islander, 0.46% from other races, and 0.97% from two or more races. Hispanic or Latino of any race were 0.82% of the population.

There were 815 households, out of which 27.2% had children under the age of 18 living with them, 41.3% were married couples living together, 12.4% had a female householder with no husband present, and 42.7% were non-families. 34.0% of all households were made up of individuals, and 15.2% had someone living alone who was 65 years of age or older. The average household size was 2.28 and the average family size was 2.94.

In the CDP, the population was spread out, with 21.8% under the age of 18, 8.8% from 18 to 24, 25.3% from 25 to 44, 25.1% from 45 to 64, and 19.0% who were 65 years of age or older. The median age was 41 years. For every 100 females, there were 86.5 males. For every 100 females age 18 and over, there were 80.3 males.

The median income for a household in the CDP was $36,333, and the median income for a family was $41,250. Males had a median income of $32,403 versus $26,534 for females. The per capita income for the CDP was $18,367. About 7.4% of families and 10.1% of the population were below the poverty line, including 9.5% of those under age 18 and 9.6% of those age 65 or over.

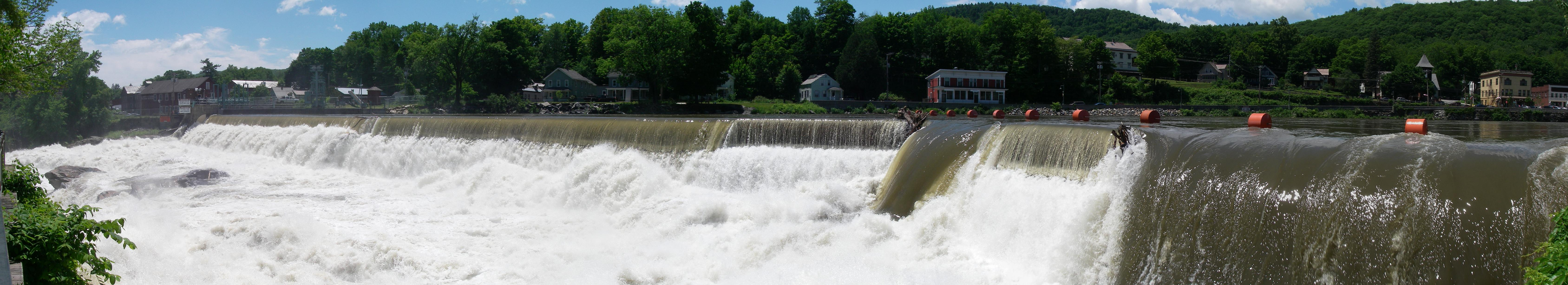
Deerfield River in Shelburne Falls

== Arts and culture ==
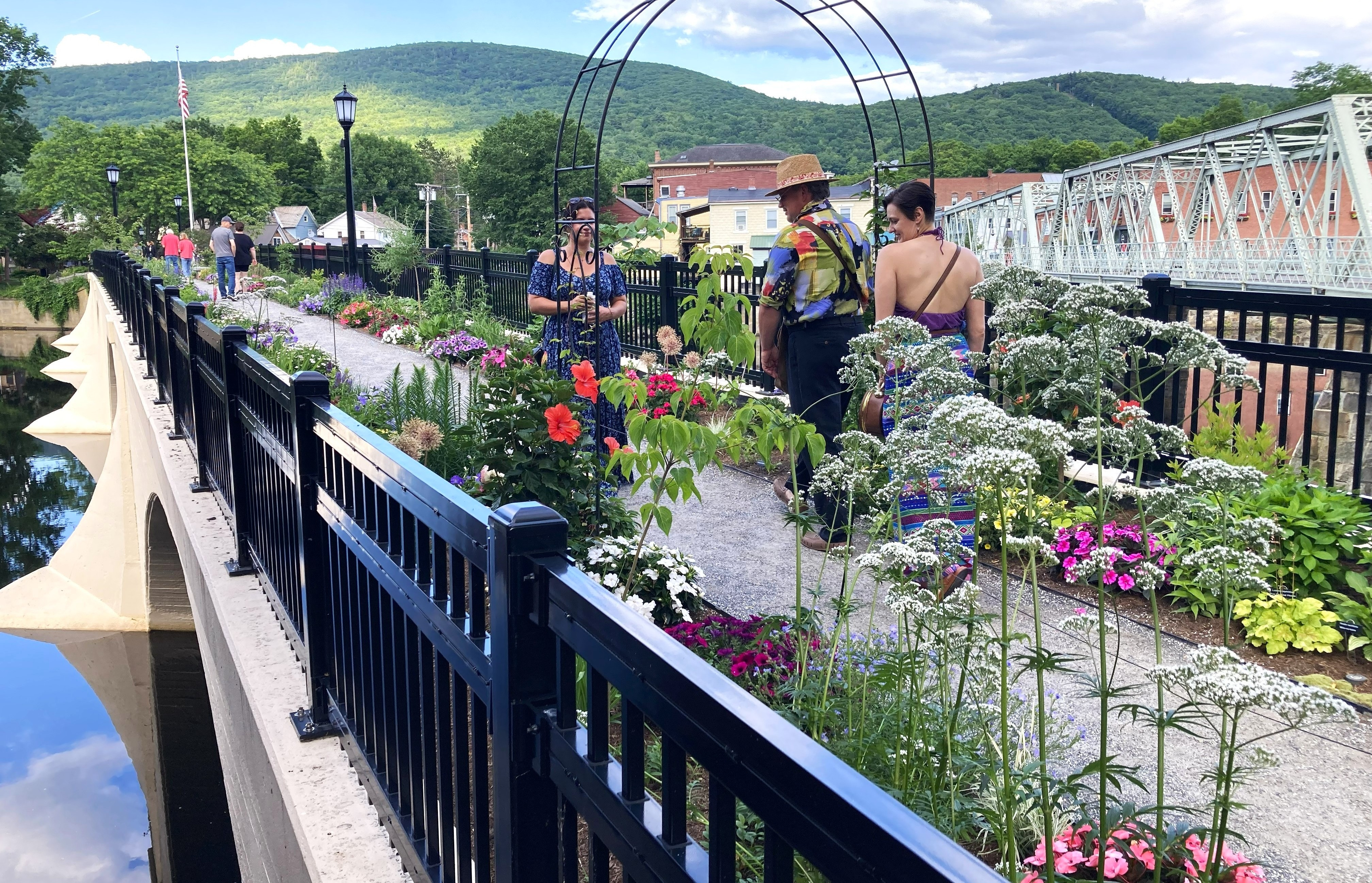
Bridge of Flowers in June 2026

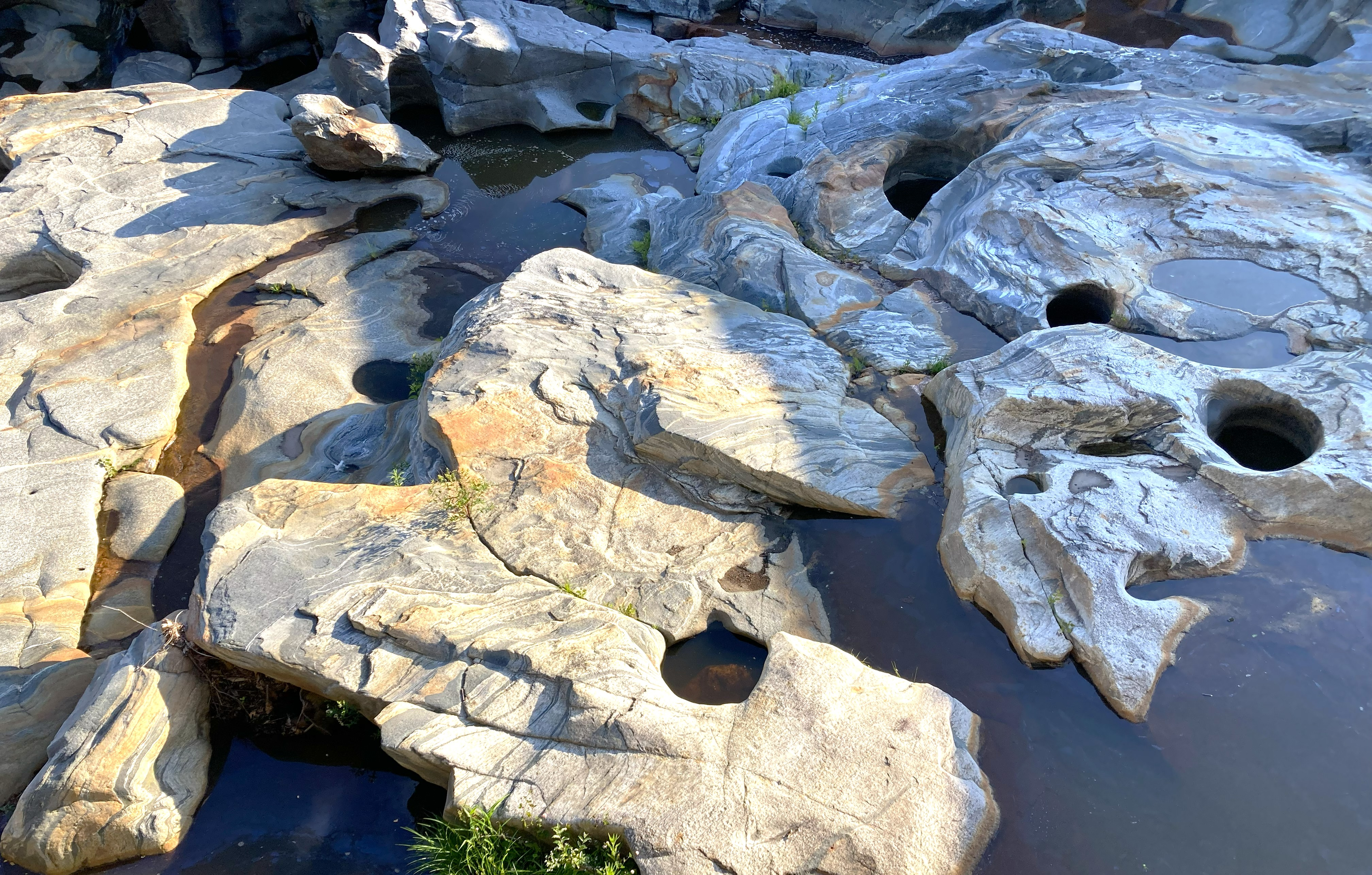
Glacial Potholes, Shelburne Falls, MA (June 2026)

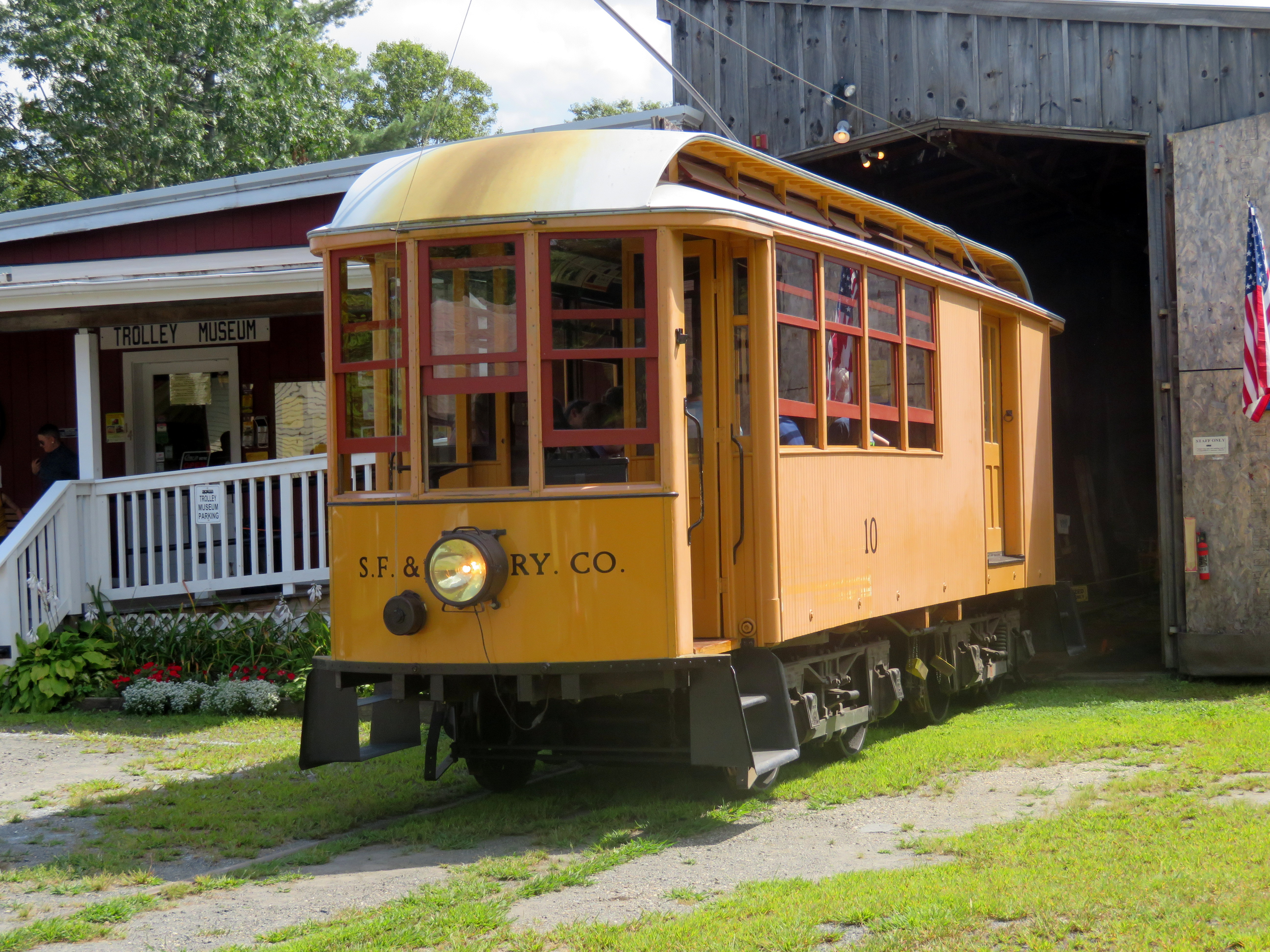
Shelburne Falls Trolley Museum

Notable sites include:

- The Bridge of Flowers, a former trolley bridge over the Deerfield River; now a floral display.
- Glacial Potholes.
- Shelburne Falls Trolley Museum.

Sites listed on the National Register of Historic Places include:

- Shelburne Falls Historic District, a 26-acre (11 ha) area, including the commercial center of the village.

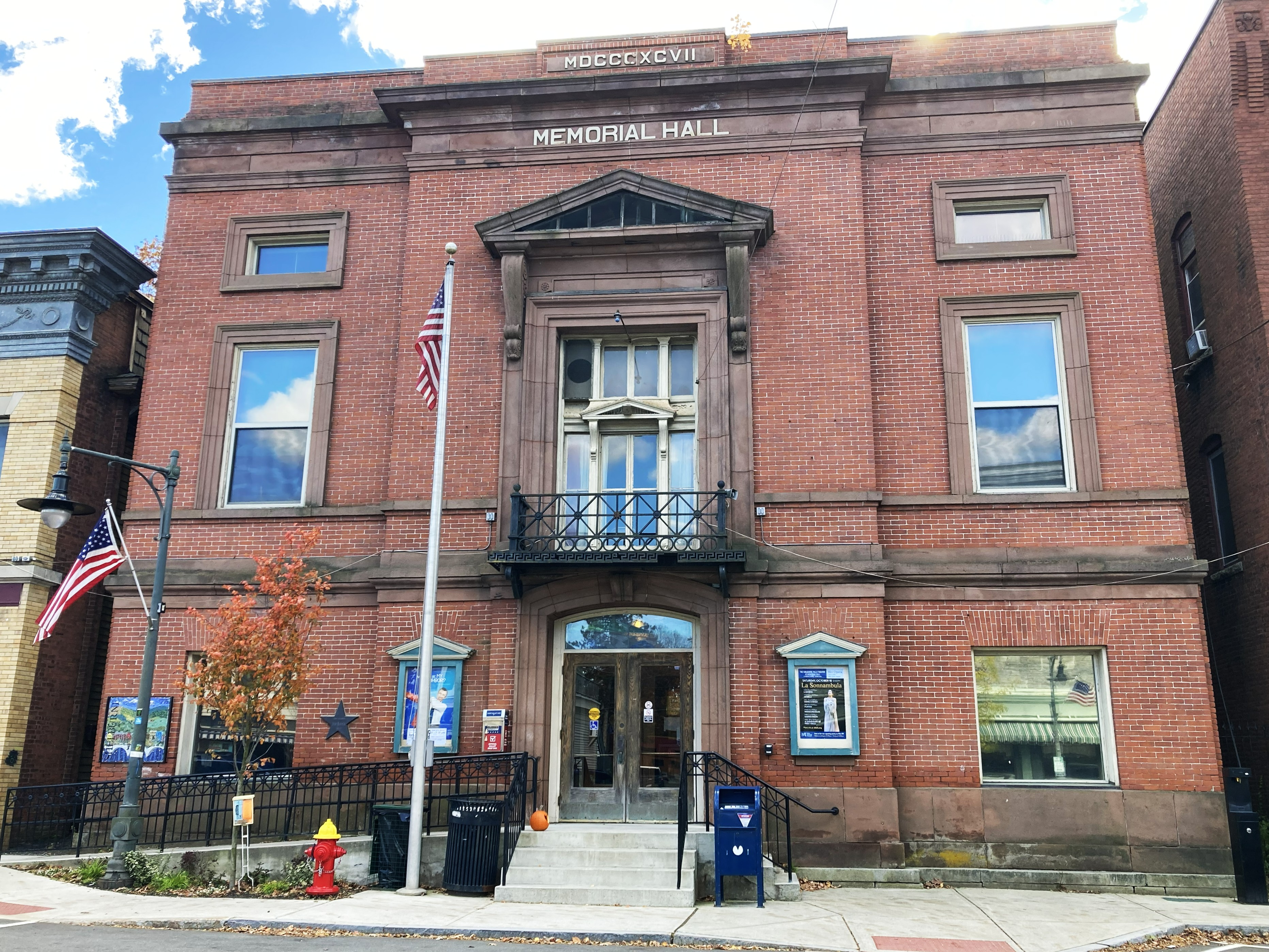
Memorial Hall

- Odd Fellows' Hall.

Television shows produced in Shelburne Falls:

- Dexter: New Blood is filmed in Shelburne Falls, but is portrayed as Iron Lake, New York.

== Notable people ==
- Bill Cosby, comedian
- Camille Cosby, television producer and philanthropist
- Halbert S. Greenleaf, former US congressman
- Silas Lamson, Lamson & Goodnow knife factory co-founder
- Epaphroditus Ransom, seventh Governor of Michigan
- Linus Yale Jr., co-founder of Yale Lock Company
- Randy Kehler, anti-Vietnam War activist and pacifist
- Dylan G. Burton, musician who played guitar in Lycus

== Sister cities ==
In May 2007, selectmen from the towns of Buckland and Shelburne inked a memorandum of agreement with officials from Mutianyu, a village in China, making the two the first known "sister villages".
