= Chub Lake (New York) =

- Location within New York Chub Lake (the United States)
- Location: Hamilton County, New York
- Coordinates: 43°49′44″N 74°47′03″W
- Type: Lake
- Basin countries: United States
- Surface area: 46 acres (0.19 km^{2})
- Average depth: 8 feet (2.4 m)
- Max. depth: 33 feet (10 m)
- Shore length^{1}: 1.4 miles (2.3 km)
- Surface elevation: 1,982 feet (604 m)
- Settlements: Raquette Lake, New York
- ^{1} Shore length is not a well-defined measure.

Chub Lake is located west of Raquette Lake, New York. Fish species present in the lake are black bullhead, and brook trout. There is trail access on the South and West shore from the north shore of Constable Pond. No motors are allowed on Chub Lake.
