= Brown Lake (New York) =

- Location within New York Brown Lake (the United States)
- Location: Hamilton County, New York, United States
- Coordinates: 43°14′31″N 74°29′27″W
- Type: Lake
- Basin countries: United States
- Surface area: 13 acres (0.053 km^{2})
- Average depth: 10 feet (3.0 m)
- Max. depth: 25 feet (7.6 m)
- Shore length^{1}: .4 miles (0.64 km)
- Surface elevation: 1,886 feet (575 m)
- Settlements: Arietta, New York
- ^{1} Shore length is not a well-defined measure.

Brown Lake is located east of Arietta, New York. Fish species present in the lake are brook trout, and brown bullhead. There is access by trail and no motors are allowed on the lake.
