= Sampson Lake =

Lake in New York, United States

- Location within New York Sampson Lake (the United States)
- Location: Hamilton County, New York, United States
- Coordinates: 43°34′44″N 74°34′35″W
- Type: Lake
- Basin countries: United States
- Surface area: 64 acres (0.26 km^{2})
- Average depth: 10 feet (3.0 m)
- Max. depth: 33 feet (10 m)
- Shore length^{1}: 2.2 miles (3.5 km)
- Surface elevation: 2,392 feet (729 m)
- Islands: 3
- Settlements: Sled Harbor, New York
- ^{1} Shore length is not a well-defined measure.

Sampson Lake is a lake located west of Sled Harbor, New York. Fish species present in the lake are brook trout, white sucker, and black bullhead. There is trail access on the northeast shore from Whitney Lake. No motors are allowed on this lake.
