= Pillsbury Lake =

- Location within New York Pillsbury Lake (the United States)
- Location: Hamilton County, New York, [United States
- Coordinates: 43°35′51″N 74°32′05″W
- Type: Lake
- Basin countries: United States
- Surface area: 87 acres (0.35 km^{2})
- Average depth: 4 feet (1.2 m)
- Max. depth: 11 feet (3.4 m)
- Shore length^{1}: 3.5 miles (5.6 km)
- Surface elevation: 2,493 feet (760 m)
- Islands: 2
- Settlements: Sled Harbor, New York
- ^{1} Shore length is not a well-defined measure.

Pillsbury Lake is located northwest of Sled Harbor, New York. Fish species present in the lake are brook trout, black bullhead, and white sucker. There is carry down access on the south shore. No motors are allowed on this lake.
