= Arietta (hamlet), New York =

Arietta, New York
- Hamlet
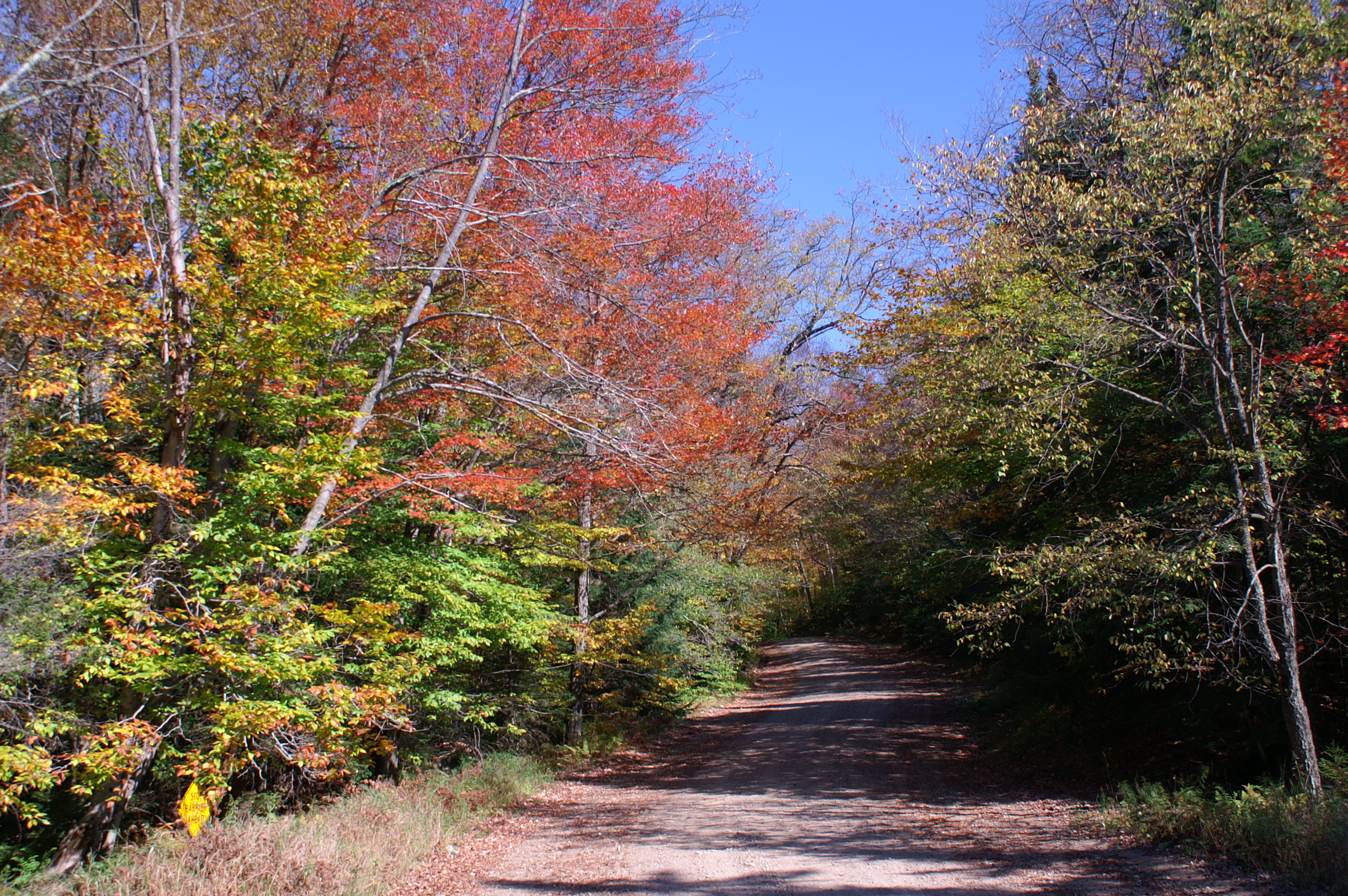
- Powley-Piseco Road in Arietta

- Location within New York Location within the United States
- Coordinates: 43°14′46″N 74°31′04″W
- Country: United States
- State: New York
- County: Hamilton
- Town: Arietta
- Elevation: 1,693 ft (516 m)
- Time zone: UTC-5 (Eastern (EST))
  - Summer (DST): UTC-4 (EDT)
- Area code: 518

Arietta is a hamlet located in the Town of Arietta in Hamilton County, New York, United States.
