= Browns Lake (Washington) =

- Location within Washington (state) Location within the United States
- Location: Stevens County, Washington, Washington
- Coordinates: 48.2356193°N 117.8101518°W
- Type: Lake
- Surface elevation: 2,041 feet (622 m)

Browns Lake is a lake in the U.S. state of Washington.

Browns Lake derives its name from Henry Brown, a pioneer settler.
