= Browne Lake (Utah) =

Reservoir in the state of Utah, United States

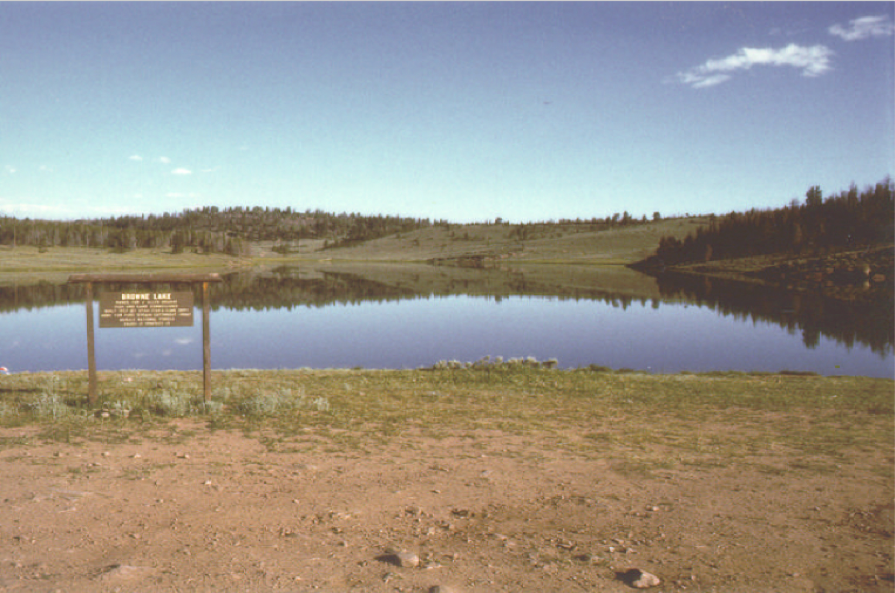
- Browne Lake, taken from on top of the dam

- Location within Utah Location within the United States
- Location: Daggett County, Utah
- Coordinates: 40.8649398°N 109.8138426°W
- Type: Reservoir
- Surface elevation: 8,294 feet (2,528 m)

Browne Lake is a reservoir in Daggett County, Utah, United States.

Browne Lake was named for J. Allen Browne, a Utah state wildlife official.
