= Pillsbury Mountain =

Mountain in New York, United States

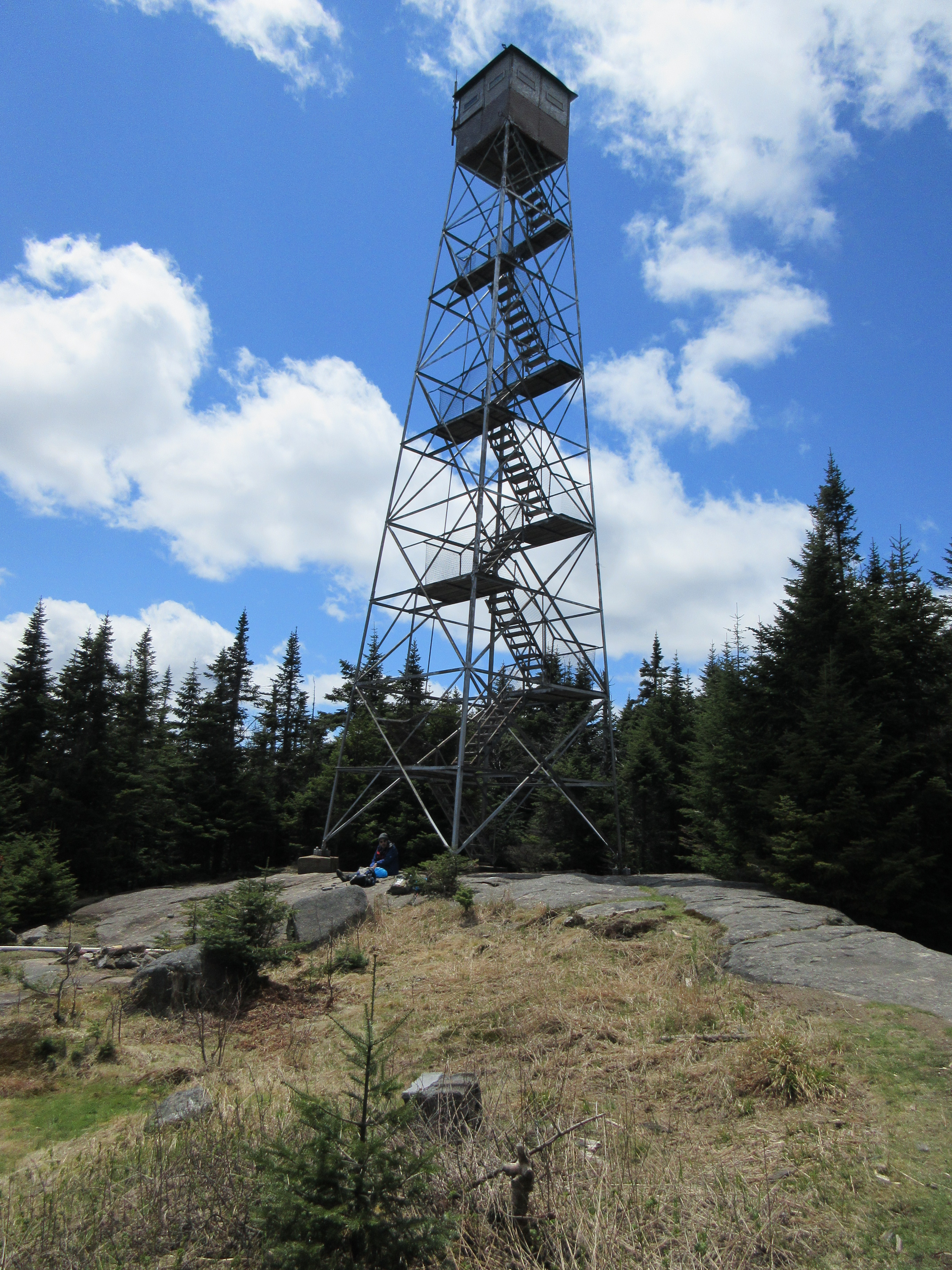

Highest point
- Elevation: 3,589 feet (1,094 m)
- Coordinates: 43°34′51″N 74°30′44″W

Geography
- Location within New York Adirondack Park Location within the United States
- Location: Hamilton County, New York, U.S.
- Topo map: USGS Spruce Lake

Pillsbury Mountain is a mountain in the Adirondack Mountains region of New York, United States. It is located in Hamilton County. The Pillsbury Mountain Forest Fire Observation Station is located on top of the mountain.
