= John Brown Lake =

- Location within Vancouver Island
- Location: Vancouver Island, British Columbia
- Coordinates: 49°40′00″N 125°22′06″W
- Lake type: Natural lake
- Basin countries: Canada

John Brown Lake is a lake on Vancouver Island east of Moat Lake on Forbidden Plateau, Strathcona Provincial Park.

== See also ==
- List of lakes of British Columbia
