= Upper Sargent Pond =

- Location within New York Location within the United States
- Location: Hamilton County, New York, United States
- Coordinates: 43°51′54.23″N 74°32′57.59″W
- Type: Lake
- Basin countries: United States
- Surface area: 131 acres (0.53 km^{2})
- Average depth: 9 feet (2.7 m)
- Max. depth: 25 feet (7.6 m)
- Shore length^{1}: 3.7 miles (6.0 km)
- Surface elevation: 1,824 feet (556 m)
- Islands: 3
- Settlements: Blue Mountain Lake, New York
- ^{1} Shore length is not a well-defined measure.

Upper Sargent Pond is located west of Blue Mountain Lake, New York. Fish species present in the lake are brook trout, white sucker, smallmouth bass, black bullhead, yellow perch, and sunfish. There is access by trail off North Point Road, 6 miles west of Deerland, New York.
