= Lower Sargent Pond =

- Location within New York Location within the United States
- Location: Hamilton County, New York, United States
- Coordinates: 43°51′22.2″N 74°33′48.3″W
- Type: Lake
- Basin countries: United States
- Surface area: 129 acres (0.52 km^{2})
- Average depth: 10 feet (3.0 m)
- Shore length^{1}: 1.7 miles (2.7 km)
- Surface elevation: 1,798 feet (548 m)
- Settlements: Blue Mountain Lake, New York
- ^{1} Shore length is not a well-defined measure.

Lower Sargent Pond is located west of Blue Mountain Lake, New York. Fish species present in the lake are brook trout, and black bullhead. There is access by trail off NY-28.

== Tributaries and locations ==
- Middle Sargent Pond – A small 12 acres (4.9 ha) pond with a max depth of 11 feet (3.4 m) (?? See talk page), located east of Lower Sargent Pond. There is a trail leading to Middle Sargent Pond from Lower Sargent Pond. The outlet flows into Lower Sargent Pond.
