= Piseco Lake =

Lake in New York, U.S.

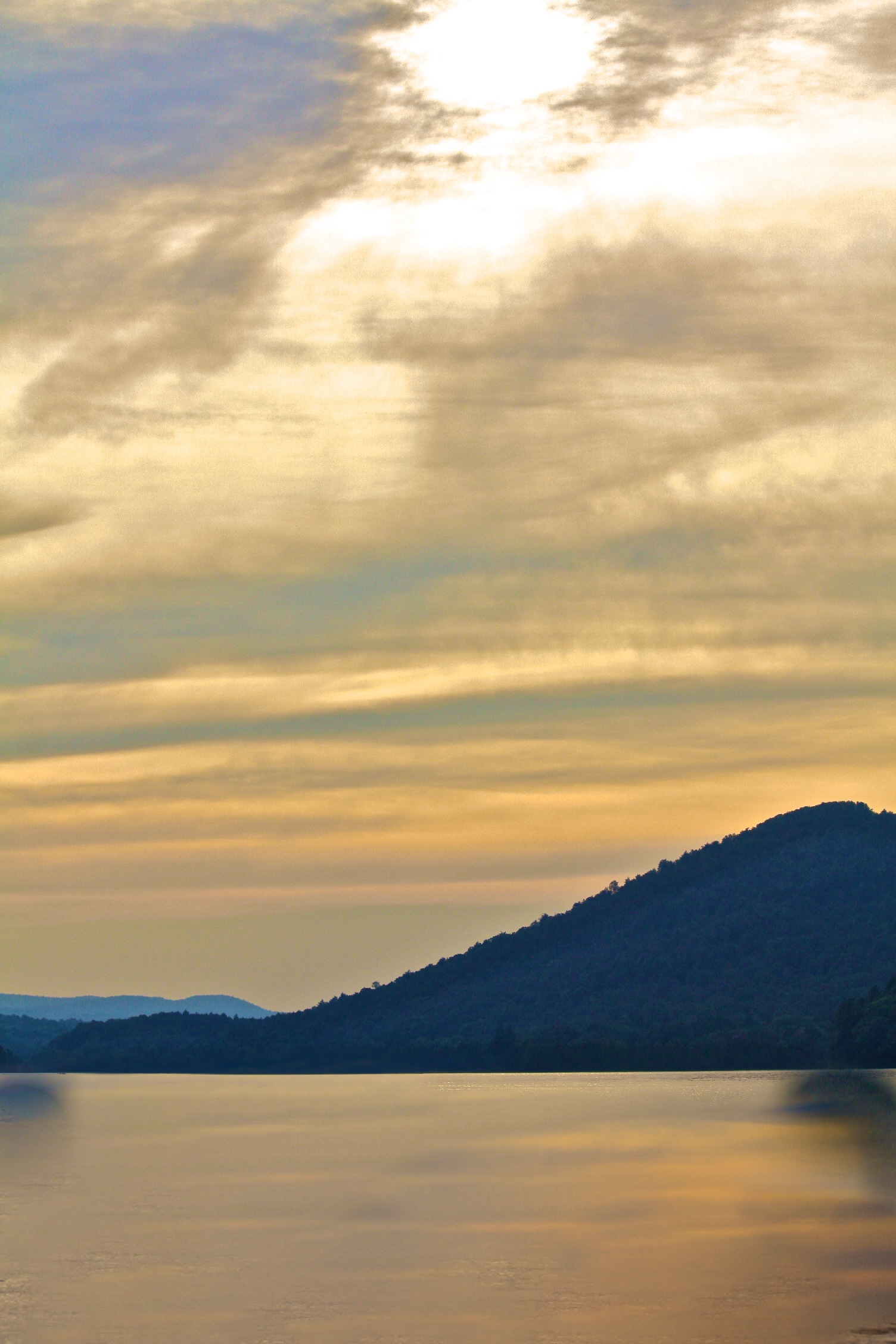

- Location within New York Piseco Lake (the United States)
- Location: Hamilton County, New York, United States
- Coordinates: 43°24′42″N 74°32′47″W
- Primary inflows: Fall Stream, Cold Stream, Mill Stream, Warner Brook, Sheriff Lake Outlet
- Primary outflows: Piseco Outlet
- Basin countries: United States
- Surface area: 2,849 acres (11.53 km^{2})
- Average depth: 58 feet (18 m)
- Max. depth: 125 feet (38 m)
- Surface elevation: 1,660 feet (510 m)
- Islands: 2
- Settlements: Piseco, New York

Piseco Lake is located in Hamilton County, New York, near the hamlet of Piseco in the Adirondack Mountains. The outflow is Piseco Outlet, which flows into the West Branch Sacandaga River. In the early 1800s Joshua Brown, who was a surveyor in the area, named the lake after a Native American named "Pezeeko" who lived on the lake.
