= Piseco, New York =

- Hamlet
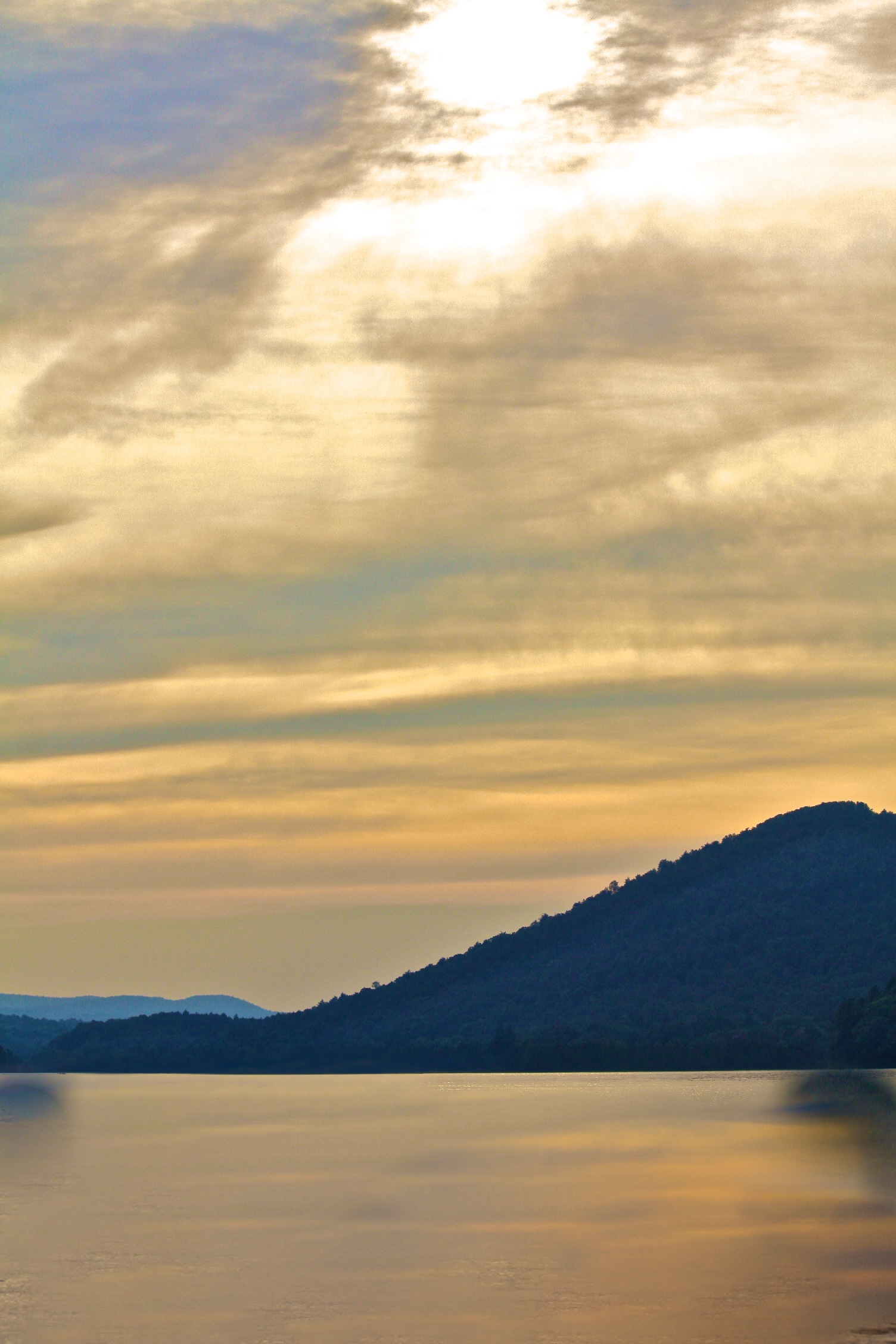
- Piseco Lake

- Location within New York Location within the United States
- Coordinates: 43°26′54″N 74°31′07″W
- Country: United States
- State: New York
- County: Hamilton
- Town: Arietta
- ZIP Code: 12139

Piseco (/pəˈsikoʊ/) is a small community in the town of Arietta in Hamilton County, New York, United States. The name "Piseco" is that of a Native American known to an early surveyor. Located in the heart of the Adirondacks, the hamlet is home to Piseco Lake and Piseco Airport. The Northville–Placid Trail runs close to Piseco Lake and the airport. The village of Speculator lies 10 miles (16 km) east of Piseco Lake.

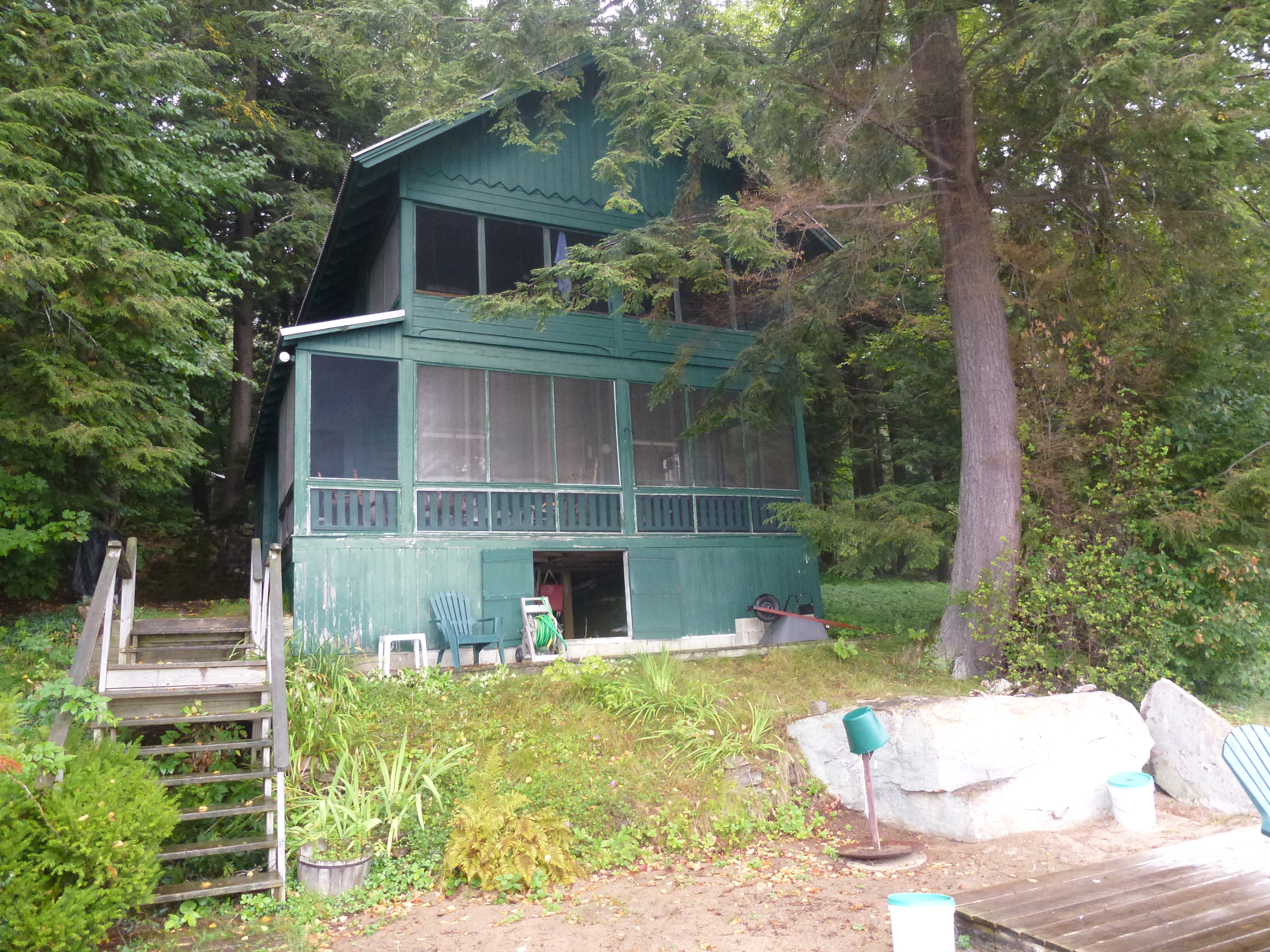
A camp on the shore of Piseco Lake
